= 1885 Oamaru by-election =

New Zealand by-election

- 20 May 1885
- Turnout: 817 (57.09%)
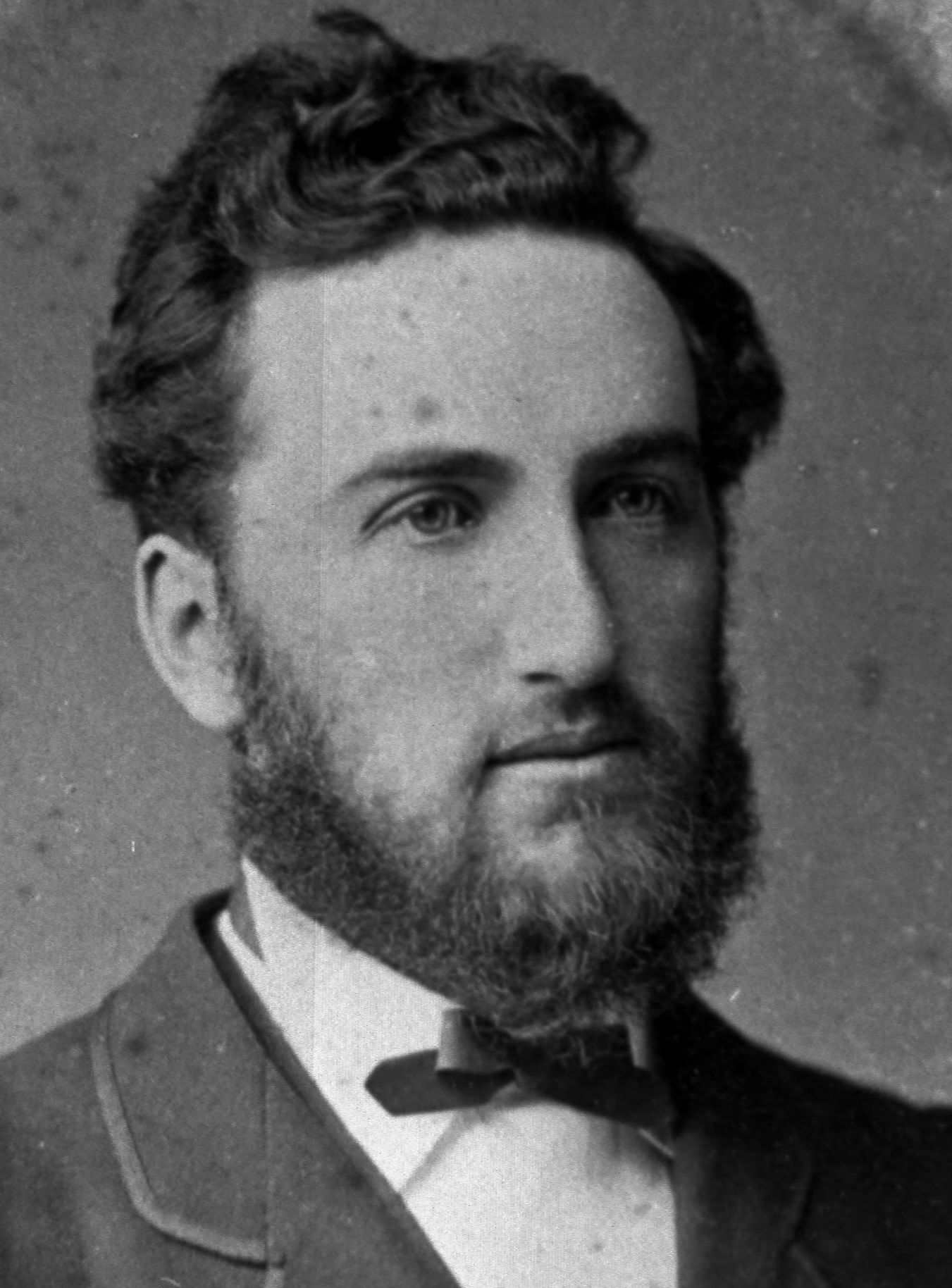

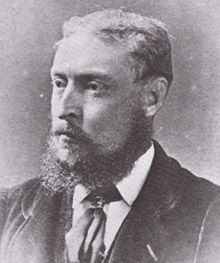
Candidate	Thomas William Hislop	Lord Reidhaven
Party	Independent	Independent
Popular vote	439	378
Percentage	53.73%	46.27%
MP before election
Samuel Shrimski
Independent
Elected MP
Thomas William Hislop
Independent

The Oamaru by-election 1885 was a by-election held in the Oamaru electorate during the 9th New Zealand Parliament, on 20 May 1885. The by-election was caused by the resignation of the incumbent, Samuel Shrimski, who was appointed to the Legislative Council, and was won by Thomas William Hislop.

== Background ==
For the 1876 election, Waitaki became a two-member electorate. Four candidates put their names forward. Steward and Joseph O'Meagher contested the election as abolitionists (i.e. they were in favour of abolishing the provincial government), while Thomas William Hislop and Shrimski were provincialists (i.e. they favoured the retention of provincial government). The provincialists won the election by quite some margin, and both became members of parliament for the first time. Hislop and Shrimski were both confirmed in the 1879 election, but Hislop resigned on 28 April 1880 "for private reasons". From 1881 onwards, Waitaki became a single-member constituency again, and Shrimski won the re-constituted Oamaru electorate.

In the 1884 general election, Shrimski was challenged by Viscount Reidhaven (who later became the Earl of Seafield when he succeeded his father). Shrimski resigned on 28 March 1885 and was appointed to the Legislative Council on 15 May 1885. Shrimski was one of an unprecedented nine appointments made by the Stout–Vogel Ministry in 1885, which inflated the council's membership to 54. Three other appointments also caused by-elections in the Tauranga, Waimea, and Southern Maori electorates.

== The election ==
Shrimski's resignation became public knowledge on 28 March 1885. Hislop was first discussed by The Oamaru Mail as a likely candidate three days later, but he declared that he would only become a candidate if the electors so wished. Reidhaven first advertised his candidacy on 6 April. William Hutchison's possible candidacy was discussed in the media, but nothing came of it.

A large meeting was held on Friday evening of 10 April for "liberal electors only" to choose a representative for the upcoming by-election. The candidacies of Hislop, who was in attendance, and Reidhaven, who was otherwise engaged, were discussed. Hislop was eventually proposed by one of the attendees, with three quarters of the electors supporting his nomination, and nobody voting against the motion. Nobody proposed Reidhaven. The nomination meeting was held on 13 May, where Hislop and Reidhaven were formally put forward as candidates, with Hislop winning the show of hands. A Timaru evening paper wrote the following endorsement of Hislop just before the election, which The Oamaru Mail quoted in its 16 May edition:

Mr Hislop is an old and active citizen of Oamaru, of liberal views and progressive energy, one too who has seen a good deal of public life. Above all, Mr Hislop has been the consistent foe of land monopoly. His noble opponent has just been called out of a position of obscurity to the enjoyment of a title. His political views have not yet been enunciated, his fitness for parliamentary honors [sic] has never yet been tested. He is an entirely untried man. A man who has filled representative public positions with credit is the most eligible candidate.

Hislop won the by-election with a majority of 61 votes (7.47%).

== Election results ==
=== 1884 election ===
The 1884 general election was contested by two candidates in the Oamaru electorate.

1884 general election: Oamaru
Party	Candidate	Votes	%	±%
Independent	Samuel Shrimski	483	55.26%	+1.39%
Independent	Lord Reidhaven	391	44.74%	
Majority		92	10.53%	
Turnout		874	63.29%	+8.27%
Registered electors		1,381		

=== 1885 by-election ===
1885 Oamaru by-election
Party	Candidate	Votes	%	±%
Independent	Thomas William Hislop	439	53.73%	
Independent	Lord Reidhaven	378	46.27%	+1.53%
Majority		61	7.47%	−3.06%
Turnout		817	57.09%	−6.19%
Registered electors		1,381		
