= 1900 Waihemo by-election =

New Zealand by-election

- 18 July 1900
- Turnout: 2,887 (65.16%)
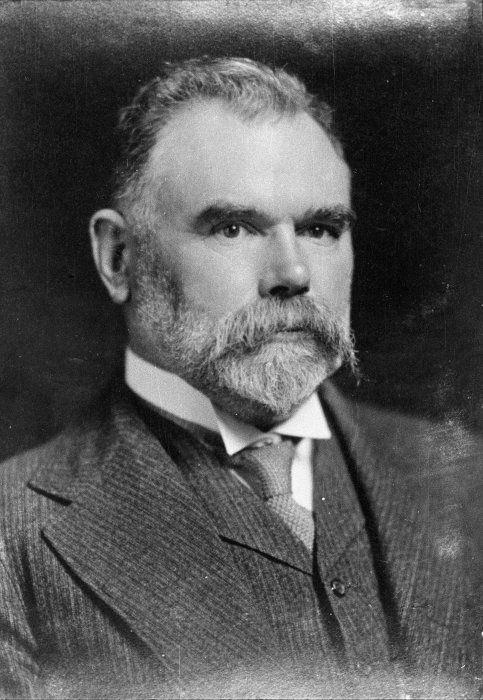

Candidate	Thomas Mackenzie	William Guffie
Party	Independent Liberal	Liberal
Popular vote	1,854	1,008
Percentage	64.21	34.91
Member before election
John McKenzie
Liberal
Elected Member
Thomas Mackenzie
Independent Liberal

The Waihemo by-election was a by-election in the New Zealand electorate of Waihemo, a rural seat in Otago, in the South Island. The seat was won by former MP Thomas Mackenzie.

== Background ==
The by-election was held on 18 July 1900, and was precipitated by the resignation of sitting MP and Minister of Lands, John McKenzie.

Thomas Mackenzie the former MP for Clutha, who was at the time in Wellington attending the Agricultural Conference, announced his candidacy as an Independent Liberal, and was a strong supporter of McKenzie's land policies. Mackenzie was an advocate of the Otago province and campaigned to stop the region's declining situation compared to the rest of New Zealand.

Former MP Scobie Mackenzie declined to contest the seat. Joseph Arkle was reported to have been accepted as the endorsed candidate of the Liberal government candidate. Both John Ewing and William Guffie also announced their intentions to stand in support of the government. Guffie, a local councilor from Mount Ida, was selected as the endorsed Liberal Party candidate. This prompted Arkle and Ewing to withdraw. The Mayor of Naseby, Alexander Herdman, also was to stand but withdrew.

== Results ==
The following table gives the election results:

1900 Waihemo by-election
Party	Candidate	Votes	%	±%
Independent Liberal	Thomas Mackenzie	1,854	64.21	
Liberal	William Guffie	1,008	34.91	
Informal votes		25	0.86	
Majority		846	29.30	
Turnout		2,887	65.16	
Registered electors		4,430		

== Aftermath ==
Mackenzie served as member for Waihemo until the end of the parliamentary term in 1902, when the seat was abolished.
