= 1962 Waitaki by-election =

New Zealand by-election

- 10 March 1962
- Turnout: 14,022 (77.80%)

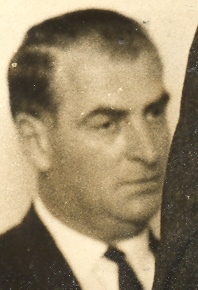

Candidate	Alan Dick	Sir Basil Arthur	Alf Barwood
Party	National	Labour	Social Credit
Popular vote	6,359	5,957	1,664
Percentage	45.49	42.61	11.90
Member before election
Thomas Hayman
National
Elected Member
Alan Dick
National

The Waitaki by-election 1962 was a by-election held in the Waitaki electorate in South Canterbury and North Otago during the term of the 33rd New Zealand Parliament, on 10 March 1962. The by-election was won by Alan Dick.

== Background ==
The by-election was caused by the death of incumbent MP Thomas Hayman of the National Party on 2 January 1962.

== Candidates ==
Labour
The Labour Party selected trade unionist Sir Basil Arthur as their candidate. In 1960 he had stood in the Hamilton electorate.

National
There were several names put forward as potential nominees for the National Party candidacy:

- Norman Stanley Brown, a farmer from Totara Valley and past president of the Waimate branch of Federated Farmers
- Alan Dick, a company director and chairman of the Tekapo Town Planning Commission
- Donald James Hulston, a farmer from Waihao Forks
- Bill Laney, a teacher and Mayor of Oamaru
- Derek Quigley, a farmer at Waipara who was National's candidate for Sydenham in 1960
- William Brown Trotter, a farmer from Fairlie

Dick was chosen to contest the seat.

Social Credit
The Social Credit Party selected Alfred William Barwood as their candidate. Barwood was director of two companies (a Fairlie-based transport company and the McKenzies Lime Works). He was president of Social Credit's Fairlie branch and vicepresident of the Waitaki electoral committee. He had contested the seat Waitaki seat in 1960.

== Results ==
The following table gives the election results:

1962 Waitaki by-election
Party	Candidate	Votes	%	±%
National	Allan Dick	6,359	45.49	
Labour	Sir Basil Arthur	5,957	42.61	
Social Credit	Alf Barwood	1,664	11.90	
Majority		402	2.88	
Informal votes		42	0.30	
Turnout		14,022	77.80	
Registered electors		18,023		
National hold		Swing		

The National Party initially retained the seat with a substantially reduced majority with a majority of only 320. With an estimated 1000 special votes still to be counted, this put the result in doubt. In the official count National raised the majority slightly to 402 votes.
