= Prime Minister Mackenzie =

Prime Minister Mackenzie may refer to,

- Alexander Mackenzie, Prime Minister of Canada (1873-78)
- Thomas Mackenzie, Prime Minister of New Zealand (1912)
- William Lyon Mackenzie King, Prime Minister of Canada (1921-26)
