= PB Fraser =

New Zealand Presbyterian minister

Philadelphus Bain "PB" Fraser (13 January 1862 – 30 October 1940) was a New Zealand Presbyterian minister, controversialist and editor. He was born in Lerwick, Shetland, Scotland on 13 January 1862. He unsuccessfully contested the Oamaru electorate in the 1893 election. Out of four candidates, he came second to the incumbent, Thomas Young Duncan.
