= William Steward (New Zealand politician) =

New Zealand politician

The Honourable Sir William Steward
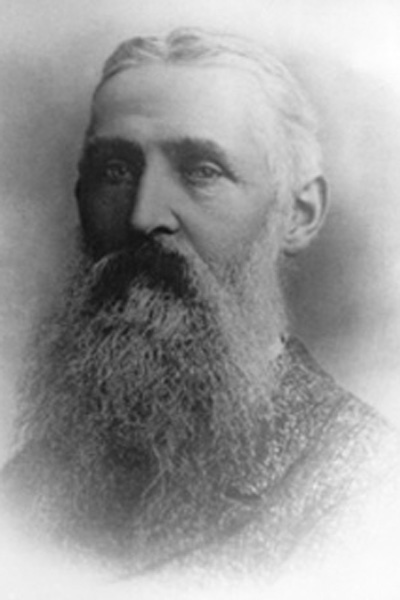
- William Steward

6th Speaker of the House of Representatives
- In office 23 January 1891 – 8 November 1893
- Prime Minister: John Ballance; Richard Seddon

Member of the New Zealand Parliament for Waitaki
- In office 1871–1875
- In office 1893–1911

Member of the New Zealand Parliament for Waimate
- In office 1881–1893

7th Mayor of Oamaru
- In office 1876–1879

Personal details
- Born: 20 January 1841 Reading, England
- Died: 30 October 1912 (aged 71) Island Bay, Wellington
- Resting place: Waimate
- Party: Liberal

Sir William Jukes Steward (20 January 1841 – 30 October 1912) was a New Zealand politician and the first Liberal Speaker of the New Zealand House of Representatives. He represented South Canterbury electorates in Parliament for a total of 34 years, before being appointed to the Legislative Council. He served briefly on the Otago Provincial Council and was Mayor of Oamaru for three years.

== Early life ==
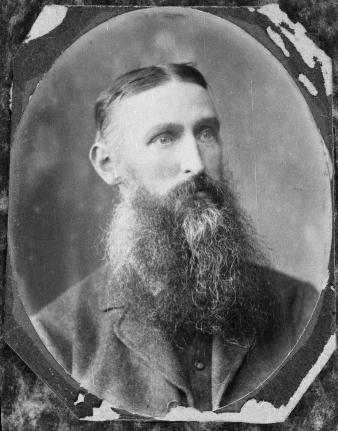
Steward in ca 1891

Steward was born in Reading, Berkshire, in England in 1841. He was educated at King Edward VI. Grammar School in Ludlow (to which his family had moved, his boyhood home at Numbers 4–5 King Street now marked by a plaque), and Dr Benham's Commercial School in Gloucester. He emigrated to New Zealand apparently on the Mersey in 1862, but his name is not included in the passenger list for the 25 September 1862 arrival.

== Family ==
Steward married Hannah Whitefoord on 4 December 1873 at St. Paul's Church in Dunedin. She was the third daughter of Caleb Whitefoord of Burford in Shropshire near Ludlow. They had one son and three daughters.

== Professional career ==
In 1863, he was working as a draper in Christchurch. From 1867, he was editor of the Oamaru Times in Oamaru. He was later proprietor of the North Otago Times, the Ashburton Mail and Guardian and, after moving to Waimate, the Waimate Times.

== Political career ==
=== Member of Parliament ===
New Zealand Parliament
| Years | Term | Electorate | Party |
|---|---|---|---|
| 1871–1875 | 5th | Waitaki | Independent |
| 1881–1884 | 8th | Waimate | Independent |
| 1884–1887 | 9th | Waimate | Independent |
| 1887–1890 | 10th | Waimate | Independent |
| 1890–1893 | 11th | Waimate | Liberal |
| 1893–1896 | 12th | Waitaki | Liberal |
| 1896–1899 | 13th | Waitaki | Liberal |
| 1899–1902 | 14th | Waitaki | Liberal |
| 1902–1905 | 15th | Waitaki | Liberal |
| 1905–1908 | 16th | Waitaki | Liberal |
| 1908–1911 | 17th | Waitaki | Liberal |

Steward and Macassey contested the 1871 general election in Waitaki. At the time, the Waitaki was a single-member electorate. At the nomination meeting, Steward received a slight majority during the show of hands, and Macassey demanded a poll. The poll was held on Friday, 3 February 1871. Steward and Macassey received 188 and 137 votes, respectively. Steward was thus returned to Parliament.

The next election was held in early January 1876. Waitaki had become a two-member electorate, and four candidates put their names forward. Steward and Joseph O'Meagher contested the election as abolitionists (i.e. they were in favour of abolishing the provincial government), while Thomas W. Bislop and Samuel Shrimski were provincialists (i.e. they favoured the retention of provincial government). The provincialists won the election by quite some margin, and Steward lost his seat in Parliament.

Steward was again elected in 1881 to represent the single-member Waimate electorate. The Waitaki electorate had been abolished and the Waimate electorate covered the area of South Canterbury where Steward resided. Four candidates had contested the election, and Steward was returned with a comfortable margin. He held the electorate until it was abolished in 1893.

In 1893 he was re-elected to a reconstituted Waitaki, which he held until 1911, when he was appointed to the Legislative Council.

Steward was elected Speaker on 23 January 1891 when the Liberal Government came to power. The 1890 general election was held on 5 December 1890. Harry Atkinson was the Premier at the time. Traditionally, the incumbent speaker would keep his position, unless the election result was not in support of the incoming government. The 1890 election did not have a clear result and the incumbent speaker, Maurice O'Rorke, lost his seat in Parliament. Alfred Saunders, an independent MP, proposed William Rolleston as speaker, as he had been a long-standing MP since 1868. But Richard Seddon proposed that Steward be chosen instead, which came as a surprise, as the latter was relatively undistinguished. The house voted on the issue and Steward was chosen by 36 to 29 votes. It was the first time that the role of speaker had been put to the vote by the New Zealand Parliament. The election sealed the end of the Atkinson government, which resigned the following day. The forming of the Liberal Party marked the beginning of party politics in New Zealand.

Steward held the position of speaker until 8 November 1893. He had not been regarded as an effective manager of the House and was succeeded by O'Rorke, who had regained his seat in Parliament. However, Steward was to remain as a Member of Parliament until his retirement in 1911. He was knighted in 1903.

=== Otago Provincial Council ===
Steward was a member of the Otago Provincial Council from 1875 until the abolition of provincial government in 1876.

=== Mayor of Oamaru ===
Steward was Mayor of Oamaru from 1876 to 1879. He succeeded George Sumpter, who was first elected in 1875. The 1876 mayoral election was contested against J. Falconer, and Steward had a majority of 35 votes. In 1877, Steward was returned unopposed. The 1878 election was contested by Steward and George Sumpter, and the former achieved a majority of 45 votes. In the depression year of 1879, Steward did not stand for re-election. Steward was formally thanked at the last council meeting for the able manner in which he had led the council, and the courteous was in which he had interacted with the councillors. During Steward's term, the most significant achievement was the installation of the Oamaru water supply, which resulted in a fall of the death rate from 10.4 per 1000 population to 8.9 per 1000.

Steward was succeeded by Samuel Gibbs. Gibbs had previously been mayor from 1867 to 1870 and was elected unopposed.

== Death and commemoration ==
Steward died in Island Bay, Wellington on 30 October 1912. The body was taken by ferry steamer to Lyttelton, and by train to Waimate. The funeral took place in Waimate.

A plaque in the St Augustine Church in Waimate is dedicated to Steward. The Waimate District Council's district plan has a formal protection for a tree that was planted by Steward on 26 June 1911. It is located beside the memorial statue for Dr Margaret Barnett Cruickshank MD.

Political offices
| Preceded by George Sumpter | Mayor of Oamaru; 1876–1879 | Succeeded by Samuel Gibbs |
| Preceded by Maurice O'Rorke | Speaker of the New Zealand House of Representatives; 1891–1893 | Succeeded by Maurice O'Rorke |
New Zealand Parliament
| New constituency | Member of Parliament for Waitaki; 1871–1875; 1893–1911 | Succeeded by Samuel Shrimski; Thomas William Hislop |
| Preceded by John McKenzie | Member of Parliament for Waitaki; 1871–1875; 1893–1911 | Succeeded by Francis Henry Smith |
| New constituency | Member of Parliament for Waimate; 1881–1893 | In abeyance Title next held by David Campbell Kidd |
