= Thomas Mackenzie =

Prime minister of New Zealand in 1912

The Right Honourable Sir Thomas Mackenzie GCMG
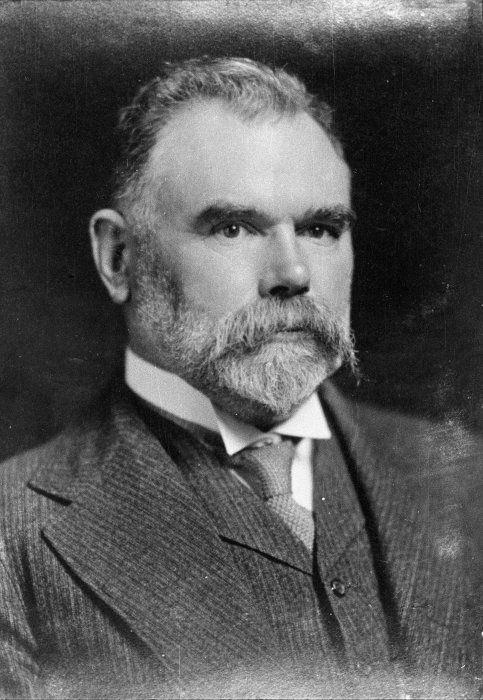

18th Prime Minister of New Zealand
- In office 28 March 1912 – 10 July 1912
- Monarch: George V
- Governor: John Dickson-Poynder
- Preceded by: Sir Joseph Ward
- Succeeded by: William Massey

23rd Minister of Lands
- In office 28 March 1912 – 10 July 1912
- Prime Minister: Himself
- Preceded by: Sir Joseph Ward
- Succeeded by: William Massey

14th Minister of Agriculture
- In office 1 May 1909 – 10 July 1912
- Prime Minister: Sir Joseph Ward, Himself
- Preceded by: Sir Joseph Ward
- Succeeded by: William Massey

4th Minister of Industries and Commerce
- In office 6 January 1909 – 10 July 1912
- Prime Minister: Sir Joseph Ward, Himself
- Preceded by: James McGowan
- Succeeded by: William Fraser

3rd Commissioner of Forests
- In office 6 January 1909 – 10 July 1912
- Prime Minister: Sir Joseph Ward, Himself
- Preceded by: Thomas Young Duncan
- Succeeded by: Francis Bell

Personal details
- Born: 10 March 1853 Edinburgh, Scotland
- Died: 4 February 1930 (aged 76) Dunedin, New Zealand
- Resting place: Dunedin Northern Cemetery
- Party: Liberal
- Spouse: Ida Henrietta Nantes (m. 1884; died 1926)
- Children: 7
- Relatives: Clutha Mackenzie (son)

Sir Thomas Mackenzie GCMG (10 March 1853 – 4 February 1930) was a New Zealand politician and explorer who briefly served as the 18th prime minister of New Zealand in 1912, and later served as New Zealand High Commissioner in London.

== Biography ==
=== Early life and career ===
Mackenzie was born in Edinburgh in 1853. His family emigrated to New Zealand in 1858 when he was four and Mackenzie was educated at Green Island School and at the Stone School, both in Dunedin. After ending his education in his early teens he worked for several years in commercial firms before, aged 20, following his brother James into surveying. He gained employment at the Department of Lands and Survey and worked in several locations including the Hutt Valley, Rangitikei and Manawatu before finally returning to his home area in Dunedin.

In 1877 he purchased a general storekeeping business in Balclutha. He managed the business well and it developed well before he sold it in 1886 for a considerable profit. In the Balclutha area he became a well-known man and was accordingly elected a member of the Balclutha Borough Council from 1881 to 1887. During this period he married, on 24 September 1884, to Ida Henrietta Nantes with whom he had five sons and two daughters.

Mackenzie was also a notable explorer. He was a member of expeditions to the Tautuku Forest (1883), the wild country between Milford Sound and Lake Te Anau (1888; discovered the Sutherland Falls), and the Matterhorn Mountains (1888; discovered a pass between Lake Manapouri and Hall Arm). He was the first person to try to map an overland route to Dusky Sound (1894–1896). He crossed the land between Lake Te Anau and Lake Wakatipu in 1907.

=== Member of Parliament ===
New Zealand Parliament
Years	Term	Electorate	Party
1887–1890	10th	Clutha	Independent
1890–1893	11th	Clutha	Conservative
1893–1896	12th	Clutha	Independent
1900–1902	14th	Waihemo	Independent Liberal
1902–1905	15th	Waikouaiti	Independent Liberal
1905–1908	16th	Waikouaiti	Liberal
1908–1911	17th	Taieri	Liberal
1911–1912	18th	Egmont	Liberal

Mackenzie was elected to the New Zealand Parliament for Clutha in 1887. During the term he decided to support the 'Scarecrow Ministry' and in 1890 became senior government whip, continuing on until the defeat of the government in January 1891. He opposed outgoing Premier Sir Harry Atkinson's ill-judged decision to 'pack' the Legislative Council with conservative members as a blocker to the new government and became an independent to demonstrate his dissatisfaction. He resigned from Parliament in 1896 to assess the British markets for New Zealand products and remained in his native land for three years.

On his return to New Zealand he was elected to Parliament successively for Waihemo 1900–1902, Waikouaiti 1902–1908, Taieri 1908–1911 and Egmont (in the North Island) 1911–1912, never losing an election he contested. In addition to parliamentary duties Mackenzie was Mayor of Roslyn from 1901 to 1902. Additionally he served for many years on the Otago Education Board, Otago High Schools' Board and the Otago Hospital Board.

=== Minister and Prime Minister ===
In January 1909 he was appointed Minister of Industries and Commerce, Tourist and Health Resorts, Scenery Preservation and State Forestry Departments in the government of Sir Joseph Ward with a seat in the Cabinet. In May the same year he also became Minister of Agriculture. In May 1912 Ward resigned as Prime Minister. Mackenzie was one of several names floated as possible successor and after a 10-hour caucus meeting on 22 March, presided over by Ward, Mackenzie won a ballot by the caucus 22 votes to 9 over George Laurenson. He also served as Minister of Lands in his own government.

Mackenzie's Ministry was criticised by both the opposition and Liberal dissidents. Liberal MP Roderick McKenzie stated that Mackenzie's ministers were political novices who had forsaken their liberal principles and John Millar should have been Ward's successor as Prime Minister. The Mackenzie government survived only until July 1912 when he lost a vote of no confidence moved by the opposition. Two of Ward's Ministers withdrew their support and several members crossed the floor to defeat the ministry and William Massey's Reform Party came to power. Mackenzie then resigned as leader of the Liberals. He did so believing the Liberal Party's policies and reforms had become too mainstream and entrenched for them to be abolished.

=== Diplomatic career ===
The new Prime Minister Massey appointed him to London as High Commissioner of New Zealand to the United Kingdom. He served in this role until 1920 during which time he carried an unexpectedly high workload due to the advent of World War I. He was New Zealand delegate at the peace conferences with Austria, Bulgaria and Turkey in 1919, a member of the Dardanelles Commission and the Imperial War Graves Commission (later the Commonwealth War Graves Commission). Historian David Hall wrote that his work as New Zealand's wartime High Commissioner was the most valuable period of his career.

=== Later life and death ===
In March 1921 he was appointed member of the New Zealand Legislative Council for Otago.

In 1923 he supported Val Sanderson in establishing the Native Bird Protection Society (later the Royal Forest and Bird Protection Society of New Zealand) and was the society's first president. New Zealand historian Tom Brooking wrote that Mackenzie's greatest contribution was his vigorous support of the cause of conservation in New Zealand.

Mackenzie died in Dunedin on 4 February 1930 of heart failure and was buried in the Dunedin Northern Cemetery.

== Honours and recognition ==
He was appointed Knight Commander of the Order of St Michael and St George (KCMG) in the 1916 New Year Honours (1 January 1916) and promoted to Knight Grand Cross (GCMG) in June 1920.

== Family ==
His son Clutha Mackenzie who was blinded at Gallipoli was active in work for the blind. He followed his father in also becoming, briefly, a Member of Parliament. His brother James Mackenzie was Surveyor-General of New Zealand from 1912 to 1914.

== See also ==
- Liberal Government of New Zealand

== Notes ==
Government offices
Preceded by Joseph Ward	Prime Minister of New Zealand; 1912	Succeeded by William Massey
New Zealand Parliament
Preceded by James William Thomson	Member of Parliament for Clutha; 1887–1896	Succeeded by James William Thomson
Preceded by John McKenzie	Member of Parliament for Waihemo; 1900–1902	Constituency abolished
Preceded by Edmund Allen	Member of Parliament for Waikouaiti; 1902–1908	Constituency abolished
Preceded by Donald Reid	Member of Parliament for Taieri; 1908–1911	Vacant Constituency abolished, recreated in 2020 Title next held by Ingrid Leary
Preceded by Bradshaw Dive	Member of Parliament for Egmont; 1911–1912	Succeeded by Charles Wilkinson
Diplomatic posts
Preceded by William Hall-Jones	High Commissioner of New Zealand to the United Kingdom; 1912–1920	Succeeded by James Allen
