= Ernest Lee =

New Zealand politician (1862–1932)

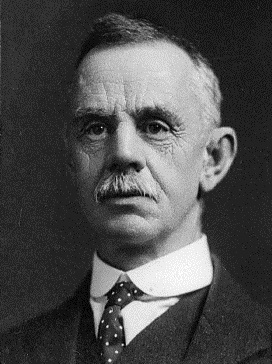
Lee in 1919.

Ernest Page Lee (27 August 1862 – 19 February 1932) was a New Zealand lawyer and politician of the Reform Party.

== Early life ==
Born in 1862 in Teignmouth, England, he received his education at Cheltenham and London. Aged 18, he started learning the legal trade in a firm of solicitors in the West of England. He was submitted to the Supreme Court of Judicature in 1885. A year later, he emigrated to New Zealand. He settled in Oamaru, and was at first a clerk in a legal firm owned by Thomas William Hislop and Arthur Gethin Creagh. He founded the firm of Lee, Grave and Grave. In 1895 married Miss de Lambert. His sister, Leah Lee, was married to the French poet Jules Laforgue.

== Political career ==
New Zealand Parliament
Years	Term	Electorate	Party
1911–1914	18th	Oamaru	Reform
1914–1919	19th	Oamaru	Reform
1919–1922	20th	Oamaru	Reform
1925–1928	22nd	Oamaru	Reform

Lee was elected onto the Oamaru Borough council. In the 1911 election, he defeated the long-serving incumbent in the Oamaru electorate, Tom Duncan. He represented the electorate until 1922, when he was defeated in the 1922 election. The 1922 Oamaru election result was invalidated due to irregularities, but Lee lost the subsequent 1923 by-election again to Jack MacPherson of the Liberal Party. He won the electorate from MacPherson in 1925, but again lost it to MacPherson in 1928.

He was the Minister of Justice (3 April 1920 – 13 January 1923), Minister of External Affairs (17 May 1920 – 13 January 1923) and Minister of Industries and Commerce (22 June 1920 – 13 January 1923) in the Reform Government.

== Outside politics ==
Lee founded the North Otago Jockey Club. He was an accomplished mountaineer and ascended many of the high peaks of the Southern Alps. He was on Lake Wakatipu when he had a seizure. He died three weeks later on 19 February 1932 at Queenstown, and was survived by his wife.

== Notes ==
Political offices
Preceded by Gordon Coates	Minister of Justice; 1920–1923	Succeeded by Francis Bell
Preceded by William Massey	Minister of Police; 1920–1923	Succeeded by Francis Bell
New Zealand Parliament
Preceded by Tom Duncan	Member of Parliament for Oamaru; 1911–1922 1925–1928	Succeeded by Jack MacPherson
Preceded by Jack MacPherson	Member of Parliament for Oamaru; 1911–1922 1925–1928	Succeeded by Jack MacPherson
