= 1869 Oamaru by-election =

New Zealand by-election

The 1869 Oamaru by-election was a by-election on 25 May 1869 in the Oamaru electorate during the 4th New Zealand Parliament.

The by-election was caused by the resignation of the incumbent MP Robert Campbell.

He was replaced by Charles Christie Graham. As there were no other nominations, he was duly declared elected. He acknowledged that he was not a local man.
