= Waitaki (electorate) =

- Single-member general constituency for the New Zealand House of Representatives
- Interactive map of boundaries from the 2026 election
- Formation: 1881, 1957, 1978, 2008
- Region: Canterbury and Otago
- Character: Rural
- Term: 3 years

Member for Waitaki
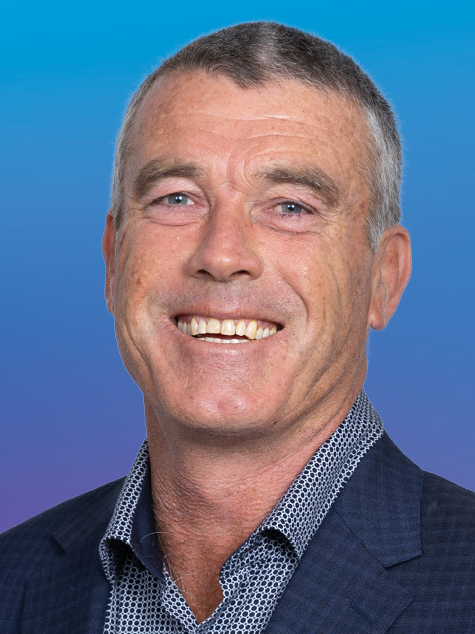
- Miles Anderson since 14 October 2023
- Party: National
- Previous MP: Jacqui Dean (National)
Party vote distribution

Waitaki is an electorate for the New Zealand House of Representatives that crosses the boundary of North Otago and South Canterbury towns on the East Coast of the South Island. The electorate was first established for the 1871 election that determined the 5th New Zealand Parliament. It has been abolished and re-established several times and in its early years was a two-member electorate for two parliamentary terms. The current electorate has existed since the 2008 election and is held by Miles Anderson of the National Party.

== Population centres ==
Through an amendment in the Electoral Act in 1965, the number of electorates in the South Island was fixed at 25, an increase of one since the 1962 electoral redistribution. It was accepted that through the more rapid population growth in the North Island, the number of its electorates would continue to increase, and to keep proportionality, three new electorates were allowed for in the 1967 electoral redistribution for the next election. In the North Island, five electorates were newly created and one electorate was reconstituted while three electorates were abolished. In the South Island, three electorates were newly created and one electorate was reconstituted while three electorates were abolished (including Waitaki). The overall effect of the required changes was highly disruptive to existing electorates, with all but three electorates having their boundaries altered. These changes came into effect with the 1969 election.

Map of boundaries at the 2020 and 2023 general elections

This current Waitaki electorate is the successor to parts of the old Otago electorate, with parts of central Otago moving into Clutha-Southland, and the boundary extended far up the South Canterbury coast, to just outside Timaru. The electorate was last re-established for the 2008 election. The 2006 census showed that there has been a general northwards population movement. Even though the number of South Island electorates is fixed, the decline in the population of electorates from Rakaia south has resulted in the boundaries of electorates from Invercargill north to Rakaia shifting northwards. However, Waitaki ended up over quota in the 2013 census and redistribution resulted in all communities south of and including Herbert being ceded to Dunedin North. Waitaki contracted again in the 2020 redistribution, gaining the Waitati area from Dunedin North, but losing a large section of land around Alexandra to Southland.

The largest town in the electorate is Oamaru (pop. 14,300). Other towns include Geraldine (3,070), Twizel (1,790), Wānaka (13,200), Waimate (3,610) and Cromwell (7,470)

== History ==
The Waitaki electorate has existed four times: in 1871 to 1946; in 1957 to 1969; in 1978 to 1996 and lastly since 2008.

The first election in the electorate was contested by William Steward and Macassey in 1871, with Steward being successful.

The next election was held in early January 1876. Waitaki had become a two-member electorate, and four candidates put their names forward. Steward and Joseph O'Meagher contested the election as abolitionists (i.e. they were in favour of abolishing the provincial government), while Thomas William Hislop and Samuel Shrimski were provincialists (i.e. they favoured the retention of provincial government). The provincialists won the election by quite some margin.

Hislop and Shrimski were both confirmed in the 1879 election, but Hislop resigned on 28 April 1880 "for private reasons". The resulting 1880 by-election was won by George Jones.

From 1881 onwards, the electorate became a single-member constituency again. Tom Duncan won the 1881 election and the two subsequent elections. In the 1887 election, Duncan was opposed by John Reid, but defeated him by 705 to 676 votes. In the 1890 election, Duncan successfully contested the Oamaru electorate instead, with John McKenzie taking Waitaki. McKenzie had previously held Waihemo and went back to that electorate again for the 1893 election.

William Steward, who was the first representative of the electorate, had since 1881 represented Waimate. He returned to Waitaki for the 1893 election, was successful and also won the five subsequent elections. He held the electorate until 1911. He was appointed to the Legislative Council in the following year, but died within months of the appointment.

Francis Henry Smith succeeded Steward in the 1911 election. At the next election in 1914, Smith stood unsuccessfully in the Timaru electorate. The Waitaki electorate was won by John Anstey that year. At the 1919 election, Anstey was defeated by John Bitchener, who held Waitaki until he was defeated in the 1935 election by David Barnes. Barnes, in turn, held the electorate for one parliamentary term and was defeated in the 1938 election by David Campbell Kidd. At the final count, Kidd had a majority of 10 votes, and Barnes applied for a magisterial recount; this increased the 1938 result to a majority of 14 votes. Kidd represented Waitaki until 1946, when the electorate was abolished and he successfully stood in Waimate instead.

Waitaki was re-established for the 1957 election and was won by Thomas Hayman, who had previously represented Oamaru. Hayman died in office on 2 January 1962 and was succeeded by Allan Dick, who won the 1962 by-election. Dick held the electorate until 1969, when it was abolished again.

The electorate was re-established for the 1978 general election. Jonathan Elworthy of the National Party was the successful candidate. Elworthy was re-elected in the 1981 general election, but defeated in the 1984 general election by Labour's Jim Sutton. Sutton was re-elected in the 1987 general election, but lost to National's Alec Neill in the 1990 general election. Neill was re-elected in the 1993 general election. At the end of the next term, in 1996, the electorate was abolished again. Neill failed to be selected by the National Party as a candidate for any of the electorates for the 1996 general election.

With the advent of Mixed-member proportional representation (MMP) voting system in 1996 and the resulting reduction in the number of constituencies, the electorate was split in half; the town of Oamaru was pulled into the resized Otago electorate and the balance was transferred into the new Aoraki electorate.

The Waitaki electorate was re-established for the 2008 election, and Jacqui Dean, incumbent since the 2005 election in the Otago electorate won the election with a large majority against Labour's David Parker. Dean increased her majority in the 2011 election against Labour's Barry Monks. Dean was confirmed as the electorate's representative in the 2014 election.

== Members of Parliament ==
Key

Independent	Liberal	Reform
Labour	National

=== Single-member electorate ===
Election	Winner
1871 election	William Steward

=== Multi-member electorate ===
Election	Winners	
1876 election	Samuel Shrimski	Thomas Hislop
1879 election	Samuel Shrimski	Thomas Hislop
1880 by-election	Samuel Shrimski	George Jones

=== Single-member electorate ===
Election	Winner
1881 election	Tom Duncan
1884 election	Tom Duncan
1887 election	Tom Duncan
1890 election	John McKenzie
1893 election	William Steward
1896 election	William Steward
1899 election	William Steward
1902 election	William Steward
1905 election	William Steward
1908 election	William Steward
1911 election	Francis Smith
1914 election	John Anstey
1919 election	John Bitchener
1922 election	John Bitchener
1925 election	John Bitchener
1928 election	John Bitchener
1931 election	John Bitchener
1935 election	David Barnes
1938 election	David Kidd
1943 election	David Kidd
(electorate abolished 1946–1957)
1957 election	Thomas Hayman
1960 election	Thomas Hayman
1962 by-election	Allan Dick
1963 election	Allan Dick
1966 election	Allan Dick
(electorate abolished 1969–1978)
1978 election	Jonathan Elworthy
1981 election	Jonathan Elworthy
1984 election	Jim Sutton
1987 election	Jim Sutton
1990 election	Alec Neill
1993 election	Alec Neill
(electorate abolished 1996–2008)
2008 election	Jacqui Dean
2011 election	Jacqui Dean
2014 election	Jacqui Dean
2017 election	Jacqui Dean
2020 election	Jacqui Dean
2023 election	Miles Anderson

=== List MPs ===
Members of Parliament elected from party lists in elections where that person also unsuccessfully contested the Waitaki electorate. Unless otherwise stated, all MPs terms began and ended at general elections.

Election	Members
2008 election	David Parker

== Election results ==
=== 2026 election ===
The next election will be held on 7 November 2026. Candidates for Waitaki are listed at Candidates in the 2026 New Zealand general election by electorate § Waitaki. Official results will be available after 27 November 2026.

=== 2023 election ===
2023 general election: Waitaki
Notes:	Blue background denotes the winner of the electorate vote. Pink background denotes a candidate elected from their party list. Yellow background denotes an electorate win by a list member, or other incumbent. A ✓ or ✗ denotes status of any incumbent, win or lose respectively.						
Party	Candidate	Votes	%	±%	Party votes	%	±%
National	Miles Anderson	22,675	51.23	—	19,281	43.22	+12.15
Labour	Ethan Reille	10,524	23.77	—	9,575	21.46	−22.35
Green	Pleasance Hansen	3,495	7.90	—	4,014	9.00	+3.37
ACT	Sean Beamish	2,477	5.60	+1.51	5,473	12.27	+0.69
NZ First	Anthony Ordering	1,823	4.12	+2.95	3,103	6.96	+4.99
NZ Loyal	Ray Bailey	1,125	2.54	—	902	2.02	—
DemocracyNZ	Roger Small	1,078	2.44	—	281	0.63	—
Independent	Daniel Shand	584	1.31	−1.08			
Opportunities					873	1.96	+0.66
NewZeal					281	0.63	+0.47 (Note: Compared to ONE Party)
Te Pāti Māori					182	0.41	+0.29
Legalise Cannabis					158	0.35	−0.07
New Conservative					72	0.16	−1.74
Animal Justice					64	0.14	—
Freedoms NZ					61	0.14	—
Leighton Baker Party					33	0.07	—
Women's Rights					30	0.07	—
New Nation					10	0.02	—
Informal votes		484			220		
Total valid votes		44,265			44,613		
National hold	Majority	12,151	27.45	+20.03			

=== 2020 election ===
2020 general election: Waitaki
Notes:	Blue background denotes the winner of the electorate vote. Pink background denotes a candidate elected from their party list. Yellow background denotes an electorate win by a list member, or other incumbent. A ✓ or ✗ denotes status of any incumbent, win or lose respectively.						
Party	Candidate	Votes	%	±%	Party votes	%	±%
National	✓ Jacqui Dean	19,659	44.44	−12.54	13,805	31.07	−22.73
Labour	Liam Wairepo	16,378	37.03	+9.41	19,466	43.81	+13.73
Green	Sampsa Kiuru	2,482	5.61	−0.11	2,501	5.63	+0.34
ACT	Sean Beamish	1,808	4.09	—	5,145	11.58	+11.33
Independent	Daniel Shand	1,056	2.39	—			
New Conservative	Troy Allan	852	1.93	+1.57	848	1.90	+1.69
Advance NZ	Heather Pennycook	594	1.34	—	471	1.06	—
NZ First	Anthony Ordering	518	1.17	–4.50	876	1.97	−4.60
Sustainable NZ	Brian Mowat-Gainsford	189	0.43	—	63	0.14	—
Opportunities					576	1.30	−1.30
Legalise Cannabis					185	0.42	−0.16
Outdoors					73	0.16	−0.05
ONE					71	0.16	—
Māori Party					54	0.12	–0.06
Vision New Zealand					11	0.02	—
Social Credit					9	0.02	—0.20
TEA					8	0.018	—
Heartland					2	0.004	—
Informal votes		698			273		
Total valid votes		44,234			44,437		
National hold	Majority	3,281	7.42	−21.94			

=== 2017 election ===
2017 general election: Waitaki
Notes:	Blue background denotes the winner of the electorate vote. Pink background denotes a candidate elected from their party list. Yellow background denotes an electorate win by a list member, or other incumbent. A ✓ or ✗ denotes status of any incumbent, win or lose respectively.						
Party	Candidate	Votes	%	±%	Party votes	%	±%
National	✓ Jacqui Dean	24,870	56.98	−5.25	23,865	53.80	−3.17
Labour	Zélie Allan	12,054	27.62	+7.65	13,241	30.08	+12.07
Green	Pat Wall	2,498	5.72	−6.65	2,328	5.29	−5.73
NZ First	Alex Familton	2,473	5.67	—	2,892	6.57	−0.38
Opportunities	Kevin Neill	1,134	2.60	—	1,134	2.58	—
Conservative	Raymond Lum	157	0.36	−3.23	91	0.21	−4.17
Democrats	Hessel Van Wieren	95	0.22	−0.42	18	0.04	−0.17
Legalise Cannabis					115	0.26	−0.26
ACT					109	0.25	−0.02
Ban 1080					86	0.20	−0.16
Māori Party					78	0.18	−0.08
Outdoors					47	0.11	—
United Future					33	0.07	−0.17
People's Party					17	0.04	—
Internet					8	0.02	−0.38 (Note: 2017 Internet Party swing is relative to the votes for Internet-Mana in 2014; it shared a party list with Mana Party in the 2014 election)
Mana					7	0.02	−0.38 (Note: 2017 Mana Party swing is relative to the votes for Internet-Mana in 2014; it shared a party list with the Internet Party in the 2014 election)
Informal votes		366			134		
Total valid votes		43,647			44,023		
National hold	Majority	12,816	29.36	−12.90			

=== 2014 election ===
2014 general election: Waitaki
Notes:	Blue background denotes the winner of the electorate vote. Pink background denotes a candidate elected from their party list. Yellow background denotes an electorate win by a list member, or other incumbent. A ✓ or ✗ denotes status of any incumbent, win or lose respectively.						
Party	Candidate	Votes	%	±%	Party votes	%	±%
National	✓ Jacqui Dean	24,547	62.23	+0.78	22,656	56.97	+1.68
Labour	Glenda Alexander	7,879	19.97	–4.05	7,162	18.01	–3.41
Green	Sue Coutts	4,878	12.37	+2.23	4,386	11.02	–0.88
Conservative	Donald Aubrey	1,417	3.59	+1.58	1,741	4.38	+1.53
Democrats	Hessel van Wieren	253	0.64	+0.18	86	0.21	+0.02
NZ First					2,763	6.95	+1.73
Legalise Cannabis					208	0.52	–0.05
Internet Mana					159	0.40	+0.27
Ban 1080					143	0.36	+0.36
ACT					106	0.27	–0.85
Māori Party					104	0.26	–0.09
United Future					94	0.24	–0.58
Civilian					16	0.04	+0.04
Independent Coalition					10	0.03	+0.03
Focus					5	0.01	+0.01
Informal votes		471			130		
Total valid votes		39,445			39,769		
National hold	Majority	16,668	42.26	+4.87			

=== 2011 election ===
2011 general election: Waitaki
Notes:	Blue background denotes the winner of the electorate vote. Pink background denotes a candidate elected from their party list. Yellow background denotes an electorate win by a list member, or other incumbent. A ✓ or ✗ denotes status of any incumbent, win or lose respectively.						
Party	Candidate	Votes	%	±%	Party votes	%	±%
National	✓ Jacqui Dean	23,219	61.45	+1.31	21,309	55.29	+3.92
Labour	Barry Monks	9,076	24.02	–8.05	8,257	21.42	–8.65
Green	Sue Coutts	3,830	10.14	+5.26	4,587	11.90	+4.89
Conservative	Jesse Misa	760	2.01	+2.01	1,100	2.85	+2.85
Independent	David Ford	531	1.41				
ACT	Colin Nicholls	198	0.52	–0.79	432	1.12	–2.48
Democrats	Hessel van Wieren	172	0.46	+0.10	74	0.19	+0.08
NZ First					2,010	5.22	+1.58
United Future					317	0.82	+0.12
Legalise Cannabis					218	0.57	+0.13
Māori Party					136	0.35	–0.15
Mana					52	0.13	+0.13
Libertarianz					26	0.07	+0.03
Alliance					23	0.06	–0.07
Informal votes		883			338		
Total valid votes		37,786			38,541		
National hold	Majority	14,143	37.43	+9.36			

Electorate (as at 26 November 2011): 49,508

=== 2008 election ===
2008 general election: Waitaki
Notes:	Blue background denotes the winner of the electorate vote. Pink background denotes a candidate elected from their party list. Yellow background denotes an electorate win by a list member, or other incumbent. A ✓ or ✗ denotes status of any incumbent, win or lose respectively.						
Party	Candidate	Votes	%	±%	Party votes	%	±%
National	✓ Jacqui Dean	23,649	60.13		20,426	51.37	
Labour	David Parker	12,610	32.06		11,960	30.08	
Green	Oliver Briggs	1,916	4.87		2,787	7.01	
ACT	John Fraser	516	1.31		1,432	3.60	
Progressive	Claire Main	333	0.85		382	0.96	
Democrats	Hessel Van Wieren	140	0.36		44	0.11	
Alliance	Norman MacRitchie	93	0.24		53	0.13	
Direct Democracy	Simon Guy	70	0.18				
NZ First					1,447	3.64	
United Future					280	0.70	
Bill and Ben					263	0.66	
Māori Party					199	0.50	
Kiwi					180	0.45	
Legalise Cannabis					173	0.44	
Family Party					87	0.22	
Libertarianz					15	0.04	
Workers Party					15	0.04	
Pacific					14	0.04	
RONZ					5	0.01	
RAM					1	0.003	
Informal votes		361			185		
Total valid votes		39,327			39,763		
National win new seat	Majority	11,039	28.07				

=== 1993 election ===
1993 general election: Waitaki
Party	Candidate	Votes	%	±%
National	Alec Neill	8,533	41.31	–10.82
Labour	Bruce Albiston	8,480	41.05	
Alliance	Rex Verity	2,268	10.98	+5.44
NZ First	Murray Francis	1,081	5.23	
Christian Heritage	Brent Boynton	292	1.41	
Majority		53	0.25	–13.89
Turnout		20,654	87.22	–1.95
Registered electors		23,680		

=== 1990 election ===
1990 general election: Waitaki
Party	Candidate	Votes	%	±%
National	Alec Neill	10,708	52.13	
Labour	Jim Sutton	7,803	38.00	–10.11
Green	Rex Verity	1,139	5.54	
NewLabour	Frances Robertson	577	2.80	
Social Credit	Fred Howard	184	0.89	
Democrats	Helen Wood	128	0.62	
Majority		2,905	14.14	
Turnout		20,539	89.17	+3.98
Registered electors		23,032		

=== 1987 election ===
1987 general election: Waitaki
Party	Candidate	Votes	%	±%
Labour	Jim Sutton	10,188	48.11	+3.01
National	Duncan Taylor	10,099	47.69	+5.50
Democrats	Dave Wood	702	3.31	
Wizard Party	David Holden	99	0.47	
Majority		89	0.42	–2.48
Turnout		21,177	93.15	–1.81
Registered electors		22,735		

=== 1984 election ===
1984 general election: Waitaki
Party	Candidate	Votes	%	±%
Labour	Jim Sutton	8,710	45.10	+2.81
National	Jonathan Elworthy	8,149	42.19	–1.68
NZ Party	Derek Wootton	1,817	9.41	
Social Credit	Percy Gould	637	3.30	+1.72
Majority		561	2.90	
Turnout		19,313	94.96	+2.83
Registered electors		20,338		

=== 1981 election ===
1981 general election: Waitaki
Party	Candidate	Votes	%	±%
National	Jonathan Elworthy	8,463	43.87	+0.95
Labour	Jim Sutton	8,158	42.29	+6.11
Social Credit	Percy Gould	2,670	13.84	–5.84
Majority		305	1.58	–5.16
Turnout		19,291	92.13	+18.53
Registered electors		20,939		

=== 1978 election ===
1978 general election: Waitaki
Party	Candidate	Votes	%	±%
National	Jonathan Elworthy	8,375	42.92	
Labour	Bill Laney	7,060	36.18	
Social Credit	Selwyn Stevens	3,841	19.68	
Values	Ian Roger	237	1.21	
Majority		1,315	6.74	
Turnout		19513	73.70	
Registered electors		26,477		

=== 1966 election ===
1966 general election: Waitaki
Party	Candidate	Votes	%	±%
National	Allan Dick	7,574	48.40	–4.19
Labour	Stan Rodger	5,585	35.69	–4.41
Social Credit	Bain Milmine	2,489	15.91	+8.59
Majority		1,989	12.71	+0.23
Turnout		15,648	90.70	–1.20
Registered electors		17,252		

=== 1963 election ===
1963 general election: Waitaki
Party	Candidate	Votes	%	±%
National	Allan Dick	8,505	52.59	+7.10
Labour	Kevin Lysaght	6,486	40.10	–2.51
Social Credit	John Julius	1,184	7.32	–4.58
Majority		2,019	12.48	+9.60
Turnout		16173	91.94	+14.14
Registered electors		17,590		

=== 1962 by-election ===
1962 Waitaki by-election
Party	Candidate	Votes	%	±%
National	Allan Dick	6,359	45.49	
Labour	Sir Basil Arthur	5,957	42.61	
Social Credit	Alf Barwood	1,664	11.90	
Majority		402	2.88	
Informal votes		42	0.30	
Turnout		14,022	77.80	
Registered electors		18,023		
National hold		Swing		

=== 1960 election ===
1960 general election: Waitaki
Party	Candidate	Votes	%	±%
National	Thomas Hayman	8,492	51.9	–0.2
Labour	Les McKay	6,520	39.8	–1.6
Social Credit	Alf Barwood	1,358	8.3	+1.8
Majority		1,972	12.1	
Turnout			94.6	
Registered electors		17,376		

=== 1957 election ===
1957 general election: Waitaki
Party	Candidate	Votes	%	±%
National	Thomas Hayman	7,942	52.1	
Labour	A G Braddick	6,324	41.4	
Social Credit	Maurice Hayes	990	6.5	
Majority		1,618	10.7	
Turnout			95.7	
Registered electors		16,007		

=== 1931 election ===
1931 general election: Waitaki
Party	Candidate	Votes	%	±%
Reform	John Bitchener	3,892	45.80	–11.84
Labour	Alexander McLean Paterson	3,007	35.38	
United	G. S. McKenzie	1,599	18.82	
Majority		885	10.41	–4.86
Informal votes		26	0.31	–2.67
Turnout		8,524	87.92	–2.27
Registered electors		9,695		

=== 1928 election ===
1928 general election: Waitaki
Party	Candidate	Votes	%	±%
Reform	John Bitchener	4,536	57.64	
Labour	Frederick Cooke	3,334	42.36	
Majority		1,202	15.27	
Informal votes		241	2.97	
Turnout		8,111	90.19	
Registered electors		8,993		

=== 1899 election ===
1899 general election: Waitaki
Party	Candidate	Votes	%	±%
Liberal	William Steward	2,139	63.32	+5.49
Conservative	John Campbell	712	21.08	
Independent Liberal	Stephen Boreham	527	15.60	
Majority		1,427	42.24	+13.53
Turnout		3,378	74.59	–4.99
Registered electors		4,529		

=== 1896 election ===
1896 general election: Waitaki
Party	Candidate	Votes	%	±%
Liberal	William Steward	2,012	57.83	
Conservative	Duncan Sutherland	1,013	29.12	
Liberal	Charles Vincent Clarke	299	8.59	
Conservative	Harry R Parker	155	4.46	
Majority		999	28.72	
Informal votes				
Registered electors		4,372		
Turnout		3,479	79.57	

=== 1890 election ===
1890 general election: Waitaki
Party	Candidate	Votes	%	±%
Liberal	John McKenzie	708	50.53	
Conservative	John Buckland	356	25.41	
Independent	George Bruce	337	24.05	
Majority		352	25.12	
Turnout		1,401	60.96	
Registered electors		2,298		
