= Jack MacPherson (politician) =

New Zealand politician

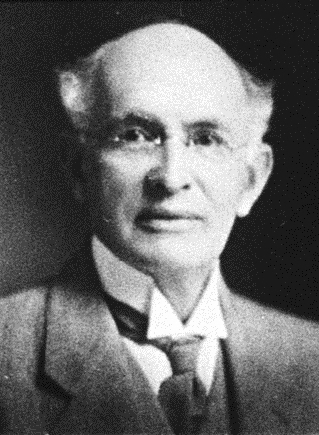
MacPherson in 1928.

John Andrew MacPherson (1856 – 21 July 1944), known as Jack, was a New Zealand politician of the Liberal Party and the United Party.

== Political career ==
New Zealand Parliament
Years	Term	Electorate	Party
1905–1908	16th	Mount Ida	Liberal
1922–1923	21st	Oamaru	Liberal
1923–1925	21st	Oamaru	Liberal
1928–1931	23rd	Oamaru	United
1931–1935	24th	Oamaru	United

He unsuccessfully contested the Oamaru electorate in the 1899 election against the incumbent, Thomas Young Duncan. In the 1902 election, he was one of four candidates for Oamaru and he came third.

He represented the Mount Ida electorate from 1905 to 1908, when he was defeated standing for the replacement electorate of Tuapeka.

In 1922 he won the Oamaru electorate from Ernest Lee. The election was declared void, but MacPherson won the subsequent by-election.

Lee won the electorate back from MacPherson in the 1925 general election, but again lost it to MacPherson in the 1928 general election. MacPherson then held it until 1935, when he was defeated by Labour's Arnold Nordmeyer.

In 1935, he was awarded the King George V Silver Jubilee Medal.

MacPherson died on 21 July 1944.

New Zealand Parliament
Preceded by Alexander Herdman	Member of Parliament for Mount Ida; 1905–1908	Constituency abolished
Preceded by Ernest Lee	Member of Parliament for Oamaru; 1922–1925 1928–1935	Succeeded by Ernest Lee
Preceded by Ernest Lee	Member of Parliament for Oamaru; 1922–1925 1928–1935	Succeeded by Arnold Nordmeyer
