= Stephen Boreham =

Shearer, trade unionist

Charles Stephen Boreham (19 December 1857 – 15 May 1925) was a New Zealand shearer and trade unionist. He was born in Richmond, Colony of Tasmania on 19 December 1857.

He was potentially the first working class representative who stood for Parliament in New Zealand. He stood for election in the Cheviot electorate in 1887, but withdrew shortly before polling day. He campaigned in the Timaru electorate prior to the 1893 election, but did not put his nomination forward. At the time, a £10 deposit was due with each nomination, which was refundable upon the candidate receiving at least 10% of the vote, and it was speculated that he would have lost his deposit.

He did stand in the Waitaki electorate the 1899 election, where he came third with 15.6% of the vote.
