= Charles Christie Graham =

New Zealand politician

Charles Christie Graham (22 April 1835 – 27 December 1915) was a 19th-century Member of Parliament in Otago, New Zealand.

== Biography ==
New Zealand Parliament
Years	Term	Electorate	Party
1869–1870	4th	Oamaru	Independent

Born on 22 April 1835 in Cupar, Fife, Scotland, Graham was educated at the University of Edinburgh. He emigrated to Victoria in Australia in 1855, and then moved to New Zealand in 1866.

He represented the Oamaru electorate from an 1869 by-election to 1870, when he retired.

He died at his home in Dunedin on 27 December 1915, and was buried in Andersons Bay Cemetery.

New Zealand Parliament
Preceded by Robert Campbell	Member of Parliament for Oamaru; 1869–1870	In abeyance Title next held by Samuel Shrimski
