= Samuel Shrimski =

New Zealand politician (1828–1902)

The Honourable Samuel Shrimski
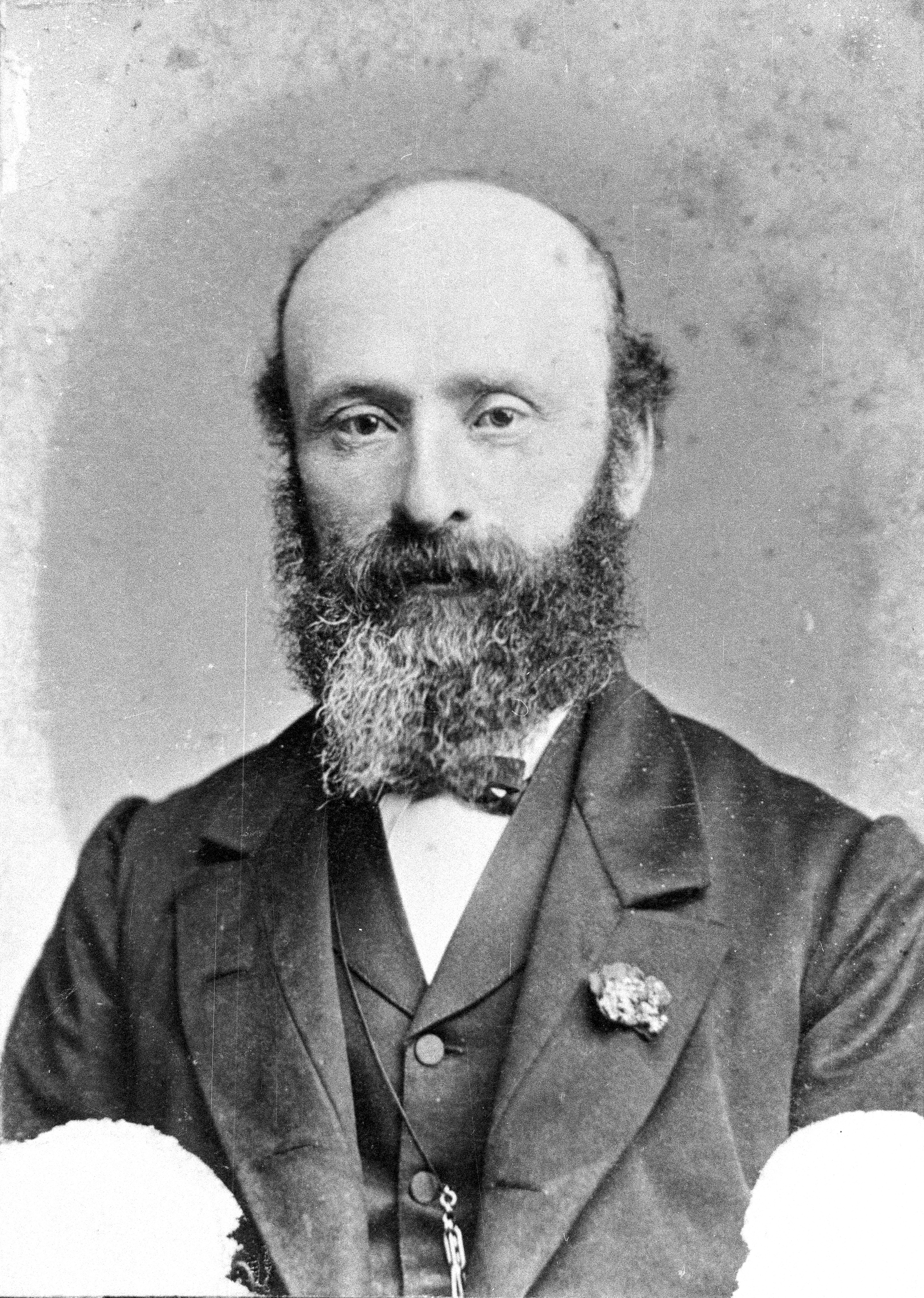
- Portrait of Samuel Shrimski

New Zealand Legislative Council
- In office 15 May 1885 – 25 June 1902

Member of the New Zealand Parliament for Waitaki
- In office 10 January 1876 – 8 November 1881
- Preceded by: William Steward
- Succeeded by: Tom Duncan

Member of the New Zealand Parliament for Oamaru
- In office 9 December 1881 – 28 March 1885
- Preceded by: In abeyance
- Succeeded by: Thomas Hislop

Mayor of Oamaru
- In office 1874–1875
- Preceded by: John Wait
- Succeeded by: George Sumpter

Personal details
- Born: 1828 Poznań, Prussia
- Died: 25 June 1902 (aged 74) Lower Symonds Street, Auckland, New Zealand
- Resting place: Waikumete Cemetery
- Spouse: Deborah
- Occupation: politician

Samuel Edward Shrimski (1828 – 25 June 1902) was a 19th-century Member of Parliament and then a Member of the Legislative Council from Otago, New Zealand.

== Early life ==
He was born in Poznań, Prussia, where he received his initial education. He went to London in 1847, where he stayed for 12 years. Shrimski emigrated to Melbourne in 1859 and came to New Zealand in 1861. He became a naturalized citizen in 1863. He married Deborah Neumegen at the Dunedin Synagogue on 28 June 1865. She was the niece of Leopold Neumegen, a Jewish schoolmaster.

== Political career ==
New Zealand Parliament
Years	Term	Electorate	Party
1876–1879	6th	Waitaki	Independent
1879–1881	7th	Waitaki	Independent
1881–1884	8th	Oamaru	Independent
1884–1885	9th	Oamaru	Independent

Shrimski was the government land auctioneer in Oamaru. He unsuccessfully ran for Mayor of Oamaru in 1870, 1871, and 1872, before finally succeeding in 1874. He was defeated in 1875.

Shrimski contested the 1876 election in the Waitaki electorate. Waitaki was first established in the 1870 Electoral Redistribution. For the 1876 election, it became a two-member electorate. Four candidates put their names forward. Steward and Joseph O'Meagher contested the election as abolitionists (i.e. they were in favour of abolishing the provincial government), while Thomas William Hislop and Shrimski were provincialists (i.e. they favoured the retention of provincial government). The provincialists won the election by quite some margin, and both became members of parliament for the first time.

Hislop and Shrimski were both confirmed in the 1879 election, but Hislop resigned on 28 April 1880 "for private reasons". The resulting 1880 by-election was won by George Jones, who served alongside Shrimski until 1881.

Shrimski then represented the Oamaru electorate from 1881 to 1885, when he resigned. In the 1884 general election, he defeated Viscount Reidhaven (who later became the Earl of Seafield when he succeeded his father).

He was appointed to the Legislative Council on 15 May 1885, one of an unprecedented nine appointments made by the Stout–Vogel Ministry in 1885, which inflated the council's membership to 54. In 1896 he assisted the Wellington Chinese community with a petition protesting their treatment and 'exceptional laws' that had been passed against them, and the proposed increase in the Chinese poll tax from £10 to £100. He remained in the Legislative Council until he died in 1902.

In Oamaru, he was a member of educational and philanthropic institutions. He held the offices of chairman of the educational board of North Otago, treasurer of the hospital board, and vice-president of the Otago branch of the Anglo-Jewish Association.

== Death ==
Shrimski moved to Auckland in 1900 to be closer to other family members. After having been ill for five weeks, he died at his residence in Lower Symonds Street, Auckland, on 25 June 1902. He is buried at Waikumete Cemetery. He was survived by his wife Deborah Shrimski.

== Notes ==
New Zealand Parliament
Preceded by William Steward	Member of Parliament for Waitaki; 1876–1881; Served alongside: Thomas William Hislop, George Jones	Succeeded by Tom Duncan
In abeyance Title last held by Charles Christie Graham	Member of Parliament for Oamaru; 1881–1885	Succeeded by Thomas Hislop
