= Oamaru (electorate) =

Oamaru was a parliamentary electorate in the Otago region of New Zealand, during three periods between 1866 and 1978.

== Population centres ==
The previous electoral redistribution was undertaken in 1875 for the 1875–1876 election. In the six years since, New Zealand's European population had increased by 65%. In the 1881 electoral redistribution, the House of Representatives increased the number of European representatives to 91 (up from 84 since the 1875–76 election). The number of Māori electorates was held at four. The House further decided that electorates should not have more than one representative, which led to 35 new electorates being formed, and two electorates that had previously been abolished to be recreated, including Oamaru. This necessitated a major disruption to existing boundaries.

Through an amendment in the Electoral Act in 1965, the number of electorates in the South Island was fixed at 25, an increase of one since the 1962 electoral redistribution. It was accepted that through the more rapid population growth in the North Island, the number of its electorates would continue to increase, and to keep proportionality, three new electorates were allowed for in the 1967 electoral redistribution for the next election. In the North Island, five electorates were newly created and one electorate was reconstituted while three electorates were abolished. In the South Island, three electorates were newly created and one electorate (Oamaru) was reconstituted while three electorates were abolished. The overall effect of the required changes was highly disruptive to existing electorates, with all but three electorates having their boundaries altered. These changes came into effect with the 1969 election.

The electorate was centred on the town of Oamaru.

== History ==
The electorate existed three times: from 1866 to 1870, 1881 to 1957, and then from 1969 to 1978.

Robert Campbell was the first representative, who served from the 1866 general election to 9 April 1869, when he resigned. Charles Christie Graham won the resulting 1869 by-election; he retired at the end of the term in 1870. The electorate was abolished at the end of the 4th Parliament.

Samuel Shrimski won the 1881 general election in the reconstituted electorate against James Hassell, one of the pioneers of Oamaru. In the 1884 general election, he defeated Viscount Reidhaven (who later became the Earl of Seafield when he succeeded his father). Shrimski resigned on 28 March 1885 and was appointed to the Legislative Council on 15 May 1885.

Thomas William Hislop won the 1885 by-election. Hislop, William Henry Frith and John Church contested the 1887 election and received 581, 345 and 100 votes, respectively. Hislop represented the electorate until 5 September 1889, when he resigned. He won the resulting 1889 by-election, but was defeated by Tom Duncan at the 1890 general election.

=== Members of Parliament ===
The electorate was represented by twelve Members of Parliament.

Key

| Independent | Liberal | Reform |
| United | Labour | National |

| Election | Winner |
|---|---|
| 1866 election | Robert Campbell |
| 1869 by-election | Charles Graham |
(Electorate abolished 1870–1881, see Waitaki)
| 1881 election | Samuel Shrimski |
| 1884 election | Samuel Shrimski |
| 1885 by-election | Thomas Hislop |
| 1887 election | Thomas Hislop |
| 1889 by-election | Thomas Hislop |
| 1890 election | Tom Duncan |
| 1893 election | Tom Duncan |
| 1896 election | Tom Duncan |
| 1899 election | Tom Duncan |
| 1902 election | Tom Duncan |
| 1905 election | Tom Duncan |
| 1908 election | Tom Duncan |
| 1911 election | Ernest Lee |
| 1914 election | Ernest Lee |
| 1919 election | Ernest Lee |
| 1922 election | Jack MacPherson |
| 1923 by-election | Jack MacPherson |
| 1925 election | Ernest Lee |
| 1928 election | Jack MacPherson |
| 1931 election | Jack MacPherson |
| 1935 election | Arnold Nordmeyer |
| 1938 election | Arnold Nordmeyer |
| 1943 election | Arnold Nordmeyer |
| 1946 election | Arnold Nordmeyer |
| 1949 election | Thomas Hayman |
| 1951 election | Thomas Hayman |
| 1954 election | Thomas Hayman |
(Electorate abolished 1957–1969, see Waitaki)
| 1969 election | Allan Dick |
| 1972 election | Bill Laney |
| 1975 election | Jonathan Elworthy |
(Electorate abolished in 1978; see Waitaki)

== Election results ==
=== 1975 election ===
1975 general election: Oamaru
| Party | Candidate | Votes | % | ±% |
|---|---|---|---|---|
| National | Jonathan Elworthy | 9,563 | 50.0 | +7.2 |
| Labour | Bill Laney | 7,367 | 38.6 | −6.4 |
| Social Credit | Don McLean | 1,713 | 9.0 | −1.9 |
| Values | Gill Morgan | 462 | 2.4 | +1.4 |
| Majority | | 2,196 | 11.4 | |
| Turnout | | | 89.7 | |
| Registered electors | | 21,356 | | |

=== 1972 election ===
1972 general election: Oamaru
| Party | Candidate | Votes | % | ±% |
|---|---|---|---|---|
| Labour | Bill Laney | 7,746 | 45.0 | +8.1 |
| National | Allan Dick | 7,356 | 42.8 | −2.2 |
| Social Credit | Alexander Familton | 1,881 | 10.9 | −1.7 |
| Values | J R Perkins | 176 | 1.0 | +1.0 |
| New Democratic | H E Mitchell | 55 | 0.3 | +0.3 |
| Majority | | 390 | 2.2 | |
| Turnout | | | 91.6 | |
| Registered electors | | 18,859 | | |

=== 1969 election ===
1969 general election: Oamaru
| Party | Candidate | Votes | % | ±% |
|---|---|---|---|---|
| National | Allan Dick | 7,033 | 45.0 | |
| Labour | N Agnew | 6,536 | 41.9 | |
| Social Credit | B R Milmine | 1,974 | 12.6 | |
| Democratic Labour | Jamie Wedderspoon | 75 | 0.5 | +0.5 |
| Majority | | 497 | 3.1 | |
| Turnout | | | 92.4 | |
| Registered electors | | 17,006 | | |

=== 1954 election ===
1954 general election: Oamaru
| Party | Candidate | Votes | % | ±% |
|---|---|---|---|---|
| National | Thomas Hayman | 6,561 | 50.8 | −3.8 |
| Labour | J H Rapson | 5,203 | 40.3 | −5.1 |
| Social Credit | F Poole | 1,151 | 8.9 | +8.9 |
| Majority | | 1,358 | 10.5 | |
| Turnout | | | 95.6 | |
| Registered electors | | 13,568 | | |

=== 1951 election ===
1951 general election: Oamaru
| Party | Candidate | Votes | % | ±% |
|---|---|---|---|---|
| National | Thomas Hayman | 7,736 | 54.6 | +2.1 |
| Labour | C J Ryan | 6,421 | 45.4 | −2.1 |
| Majority | | 1,315 | 9.2 | |
| Turnout | | | 92.6 | |
| Registered electors | | 15,312 | | |

=== 1949 election ===
1949 general election: Oamaru
| Party | Candidate | Votes | % | ±% |
|---|---|---|---|---|
| National | Thomas Hayman | 7,415 | 54.6 | |
| Labour | Arnold Nordmeyer | 6,721 | 45.4 | −3.1 |
| Informal votes | | 64 | 0.4 | +0.1 |
| Majority | | 694 | 5.0 | |
| Turnout | | 14,950 | 95.0 | +0.2 |
| Registered electors | | 15,658 | | |

=== 1946 election ===
1946 general election: Oamaru
| Party | Candidate | Votes | % | ±% |
|---|---|---|---|---|
| Labour | Arnold Nordmeyer | 7,079 | 50.6 | +2.8 |
| National | Thomas Ross Beatty | 6,847 | 49.0 | +2.4 |
| Independent Liberal | George Percival Cuttriss | 56 | 0.4 | −1.51 |
| Informal votes | | 53 | 0.3 | −0.5 |
| Majority | | 232 | 1.6 | +0.5 |
| Turnout | | 14,035 | 94.8 | −1.8 |
| Registered electors | | 14,736 | | |

=== 1943 election ===
1943 general election: Oamaru
| Party | Candidate | Votes | % | ±% |
|---|---|---|---|---|
| Labour | Arnold Nordmeyer | 5,151 | 47.81 | −5.26 |
| National | Thomas Ross Beatty | 5,026 | 46.65 | |
| Democratic Labour | George Barclay | 339 | 3.14 | |
| People's Movement | George Percival Cuttriss | 167 | 1.55 | |
| Informal votes | | 90 | 0.83 | +0.25 |
| Majority | | 125 | 1.16 | −5.57 |
| Turnout | | 10,773 | 96.67 | +1.34 |
| Registered electors | | 11,143 | | |

=== 1938 election ===
1938 general election: Oamaru
| Party | Candidate | Votes | % | ±% |
|---|---|---|---|---|
| Labour | Arnold Nordmeyer | 5,971 | 53.07 | +3.14 |
| National | Frank Cooney | 5,213 | 46.33 | |
| Informal votes | | 66 | 0.58 | −0.72 |
| Majority | | 758 | 6.73 | −4.25 |
| Turnout | | 11,250 | 95.33 | +2.97 |
| Registered electors | | 11,801 | | |

=== 1935 election ===
1935 general election: Oamaru
| Party | Candidate | Votes | % | ±% |
|---|---|---|---|---|
| Labour | Arnold Nordmeyer | 5,296 | 50.93 | |
| United | Jack MacPherson | 4,154 | 39.94 | −1.53 |
| Democrat | Herbert Gladstone Hill | 948 | 9.11 | |
| Informal votes | | 136 | 1.30 | +0.92 |
| Majority | | 1,142 | 10.98 | |
| Turnout | | 10,398 | 92.36 | +3.84 |
| Registered electors | | 11,257 | | |

=== 1931 election ===
1931 general election: Oamaru
| Party | Candidate | Votes | % | ±% |
|---|---|---|---|---|
| United | Jack MacPherson | 3,992 | 41.47 | |
| Reform | John Kirkness | 2,946 | 30.60 | |
| Labour | Percival Malthus | 2,688 | 27.92 | |
| Majority | | 1,046 | 10.87 | |
| Informal votes | | 37 | 0.38 | |
| Turnout | | 9,663 | 88.52 | |
| Registered electors | | 10,916 | | |

=== 1928 election ===
1928 general election: Oamaru
| Party | Candidate | Votes | % | ±% |
|---|---|---|---|---|
| United | Jack MacPherson | 5,016 | 51.74 | |
| Reform | Ernest Lee | 4,679 | 48.26 | |
| Majority | | 337 | 3.48 | |
| Informal votes | | 83 | 0.85 | |
| Turnout | | 9,778 | 91.81 | 10,650 |
| Registered electors | | | | |

=== 1923 by-election ===
1923 Oamaru by-election
| Party | Candidate | Votes | % | ±% |
|---|---|---|---|---|
| Liberal | John MacPherson | 4,492 | 52.00 | |
| Reform | Ernest Lee | 4,147 | 48.00 | |
| Informal votes | | 21 | 0.24 | |
| Majority | | 345 | 3.99 | |
| Turnout | | 8,660 | 94.18 | |
| Registered electors | | 9,195 | | |

=== 1902 election ===
1902 general election: Oamaru
| Party | Candidate | Votes | % | ±% |
|---|---|---|---|---|
| Liberal | Tom Duncan | 2,141 | 50.29 | −16.44 |
| Independent | John Marshall Brown | 1,261 | 29.62 | |
| Liberal | Jack MacPherson | 717 | 16.84 | −16.42 |
| Conservative | Henry Beloe Crawford | 138 | 3.24 | |
| Majority | | 880 | 20.67 | −12.80 |
| Turnout | | 4,257 | 81.54 | +4.79 |
| Registered electors | | 5,221 | | |

=== 1899 election ===
1899 general election: Oamaru
| Party | Candidate | Votes | % | ±% |
|---|---|---|---|---|
| Liberal | Tom Duncan | 2,500 | 66.74 | +6.65 |
| Liberal | Jack MacPherson | 1,246 | 33.26 | |
| Majority | | 1,254 | 33.48 | +13.31 |
| Turnout | | 3,746 | 76.75 | −7.46 |
| Registered electors | | 4,881 | | |

=== 1893 election ===
1893 general election: Oamaru
| Party | Candidate | Votes | % | ±% |
|---|---|---|---|---|
| Liberal | Tom Duncan | 1,611 | 51.83 | −11.68 |
| Independent | PB Fraser | 1,195 | 38.45 | |
| Liberal | David Dunn | 252 | 8.11 | |
| Independent | William Henry Frith | 50 | 1.61 | |
| Majority | | 416 | 13.38 | −13.63 |
| Turnout | | 3,108 | 75.04 | −2.30 |
| Registered electors | | 4,142 | | |

=== 1890 election ===
1890 general election: Oamaru
| Party | Candidate | Votes | % | ±% |
|---|---|---|---|---|
| Liberal | Tom Duncan | 1,105 | 63.51 | |
| Conservative | Thomas William Hislop | 635 | 36.49 | |
| Majority | | 470 | 27.01 | |
| Turnout | | 1,740 | 72.74 | |
| Registered electors | | 2,392 | | |

=== 1889 by-election ===
1889 Oamaru by-election
| Party | Candidate | Votes | % | ±% |
|---|---|---|---|---|
| Independent | Thomas William Hislop | 549 | 56.95 | |
| Liberal | David Dunn | 415 | 43.05 | |
| Majority | | 134 | 13.90 | |
| Turnout | | 964 | | |

=== 1885 by-election ===
1885 Oamaru by-election
| Party | Candidate | Votes | % | ±% |
|---|---|---|---|---|
| Independent | Thomas William Hislop | 439 | 53.73% | |
| Independent | Lord Reidhaven | 378 | 46.27% | +1.53% |
| Majority | | 61 | 7.47% | −3.06% |
| Turnout | | 817 | 57.09% | −6.19% |
| Registered electors | | 1,381 | | |

=== 1884 election ===
1884 general election: Oamaru
| Party | Candidate | Votes | % | ±% |
|---|---|---|---|---|
| Independent | Samuel Shrimski | 483 | 55.26% | +1.39% |
| Independent | Francis Ogilvie-Grant | 391 | 44.74% | |
| Majority | | 92 | 10.53% | |
| Turnout | | 874 | 63.29% | +8.27% |
| Registered electors | | 1,381 | | |

=== 1881 election ===
1881 general election: Oamaru
| Party | Candidate | Votes | % | ±% |
|---|---|---|---|---|
| Independent | Samuel Shrimski | 396 | 53.88% | |
| Independent | James Hassell | 337 | 46.12% | |
| Majority | | 57 | 7.76% | |
| Informal votes | | 19 | 1.42% | |
| Turnout | | 735 | 55.01% | |
| Registered electors | | 1,336 | | |
