= George Jones (New Zealand politician) =

New Zealand politician

New Zealand Parliament
Years	Term	Electorate	Party
1880–1881	7th	Waitaki	Independent

George Jones (1844 – 16 December 1920) was a 19th-century member of parliament in Otago, New Zealand.

== Education and career ==
Jones was born in Upper Hutt in 1844. He went to Australia with his parents, where he received his education at Scales Academy and then at the Geelong Grammar School. He learned his trade in printing and writing and returned to New Zealand in 1863, where he took up roles with the Christchurch newspapers Canterbury Standard (owned by Joseph Brittan), the Lyttelton Times, and then The Press. He moved to Ngaruawahia in 1872, where he set up the Waikato Times, selling it when he moved to Oamuru in 1877.

In 1877, Jones acquired the Oamaru Mail newspaper. That same year, Jones and his newspaper were caught up in a criminal libel case after Jones published an article accusing the Attorney-General Frederick Whitaker of sponsoring a Native Land Bill to assist in the acquisition of confiscated Māori land for himself and his friends. Jones was acquitted during that trial, which boosted the Evening Mail's fortunes and public image. The New Zealand media hailed the outcome of the case as a victory for press freedom. Under Jones' leadership, the Oamaru Mail experienced a boom in advertising and circulation. He and his family retained control of the Oamaru Mail and the Invercargill-based Southland News.

== Political career ==
He represented the Waitaki electorate from 1880 to 1881, when he retired. He was appointed to the Legislative Council in 1895, until he died in 1920.

== Legacy ==
Following Jones' death in 1920, his son E.A. Jones inherited the Oamaru Mail and became the governing director of both the Oamaru Mail and the Southland News; the latter of which had been acquired by Southland News Ltd. The two companies were run in tandem with each other.

New Zealand Parliament
Preceded by Thomas Hislop	Member of Parliament for Waitaki; 1880–1881; Served alongside: Samuel Shrimski	Succeeded by Tom Duncan
