= Jonathan Elworthy =

New Zealand politician

Jonathan Herbert Elworthy (1 July 1936 – 17 June 2005) was a New Zealand Member of Parliament for Oamaru and Waitaki, in the South Island, representing the National Party.

== Early life ==
Elworthy was born in 1936, and received his education at Christ's College and Lincoln College. He was the brother of Peter Elworthy.

== Member of Parliament ==
New Zealand Parliament
Years	Term	Electorate	Party
1975–1978	38th	Oamaru	National
1978–1981	39th	Waitaki	National
1981–1984	40th	Waitaki	National

Elworthy represented the Oamaru electorate (1975–1978) and the Waitaki electorate (1978–1984) in the New Zealand House of Representatives. In the 1984 election, he was defeated by Jim Sutton.

He was Minister of Lands and Minister of Forests from 1981 to 1984 under Robert Muldoon.

== Later life ==
Jonathan Elworthy was awarded the Queen's Silver Jubilee Medal for service to the community and the New Zealand 1990 Commemoration Medal for services to New Zealand.

== Notes ==
New Zealand Parliament
Preceded by Bill Laney	Member of Parliament for Oamaru; 1975–1978	Constituency abolished
In abeyance Title last held by Allan Dick	Member of Parliament for Waitaki; 1978–1984	Succeeded by Jim Sutton
