= 1889 Oamaru by-election =

New Zealand by-election

- 30 September 1889
- Turnout: 964
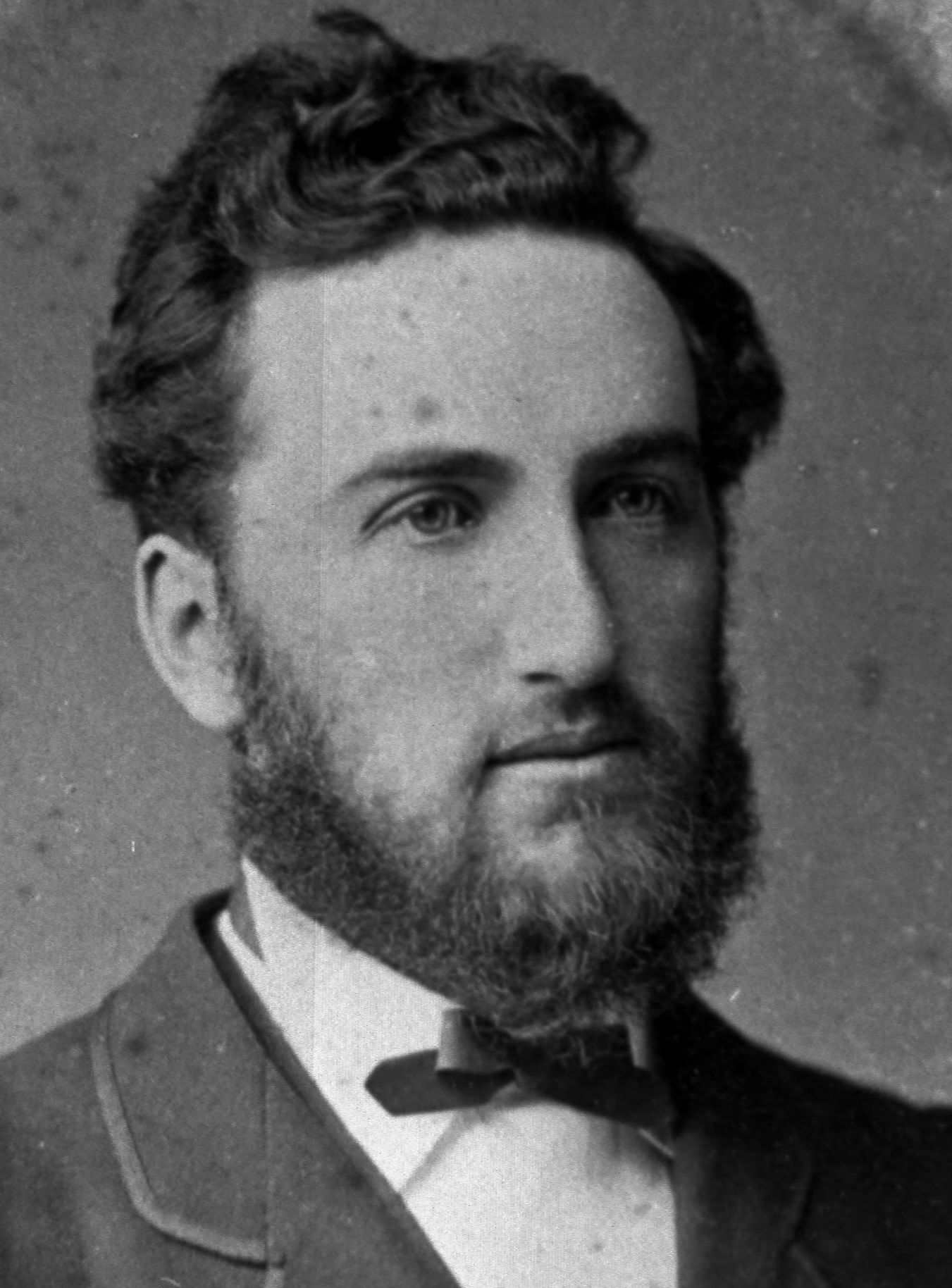

Candidate	Thomas William Hislop	David Dunn
Party	Independent	Liberal
Popular vote	549	415
Percentage	56.95%	43.05%
MP before election
Thomas William Hislop
Independent
Elected MP
Thomas William Hislop
Independent

The 1889 Oamaru by-election was a by-election held on 30 September 1889 in the Oamaru electorate during the 10th New Zealand Parliament.

== Background ==
The by-election was triggered by the resignation of the incumbent MP Thomas William Hislop. The resignation was caused by the Ward-Hislop affair where Hislop was reproached by a Legislative Council committee for his manner of correspondence with a District Judge Ward. The report judged that he was using his Ministerial position to aid the business affairs of his personal friends. He had also resigned his ministerial portfolios.

== Campaign ==
Hislop stood again to regain his position as an MP. He was opposed by David Dunn. Dunn, the Liberal Party candidate, claimed to be "...one having no political experience at all." This was despite the fact that he had been elected Mayor of Oamaru in 1888.

Hislop's majority was reduced from 136 to 134 after two votes were removed. One person was charged with voting twice (personation).

== Results ==
The following table gives the election result:

1889 Oamaru by-election
Party	Candidate	Votes	%	±%
Independent	Thomas William Hislop	549	56.95	
Liberal	David Dunn	415	43.05	
Majority		134	13.90	
Turnout		964		
