= 1923 Oamaru by-election =

New Zealand by-election

- 1 May 1923
- Turnout: 8,660 (94.18%)
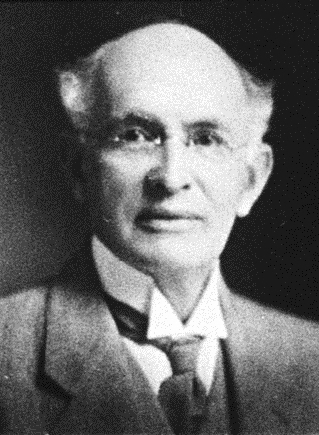

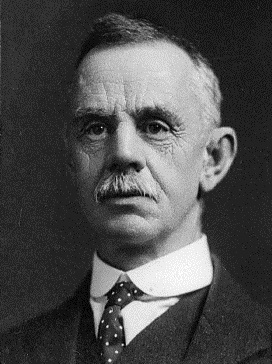
Candidate	Jack MacPherson	Ernest Lee
Party	Liberal	Reform
Popular vote	4,492	4,147
Percentage	52.00	48.00
Member before election
Jack MacPherson
Liberal
Elected Member
Jack MacPherson
Liberal

The Oamaru by-election of 1923 was a by-election during the 21st New Zealand Parliament. The by-election was called following the invalidation of the preceding 1922 general election result due to irregularities. It was held on 1 May 1923.

== Background ==
When the preliminary counts for the 1922 general election in the Oamaru electorate were announced, Ernest Lee was ahead of Jack MacPherson by just one vote. Once the absentee votes had been counted, it was announced that MacPherson was leading by five votes, but this was subsequently increased to 25 votes. A recount was ordered, during which some irregularities came to light, and Lee asked for a judicial review. The court case was heard at the Supreme Court in Wellington by Sir Robert Stout and Justice Alexander Samuel Adams, who declared the election void and ordered the parties to pay their own expenses.

== Candidates ==
Two candidates contested the seat. Jack MacPherson (Liberal Party), who had taken the seat off the incumbent Ernest Lee (Reform Party), again won the vote.

== Result ==
The following table gives the election results:

1923 Oamaru by-election
Party	Candidate	Votes	%	±%
Liberal	John MacPherson	4,492	52.00	
Reform	Ernest Lee	4,147	48.00	
Informal votes		21	0.24	
Majority		345	3.99	
Turnout		8,660	94.18	
Registered electors		9,195		

MacPherson won the by-election. At the subsequent general election in 1925, Lee in turn defeated MacPherson.
