= Allan Dick (politician) =

New Zealand politician

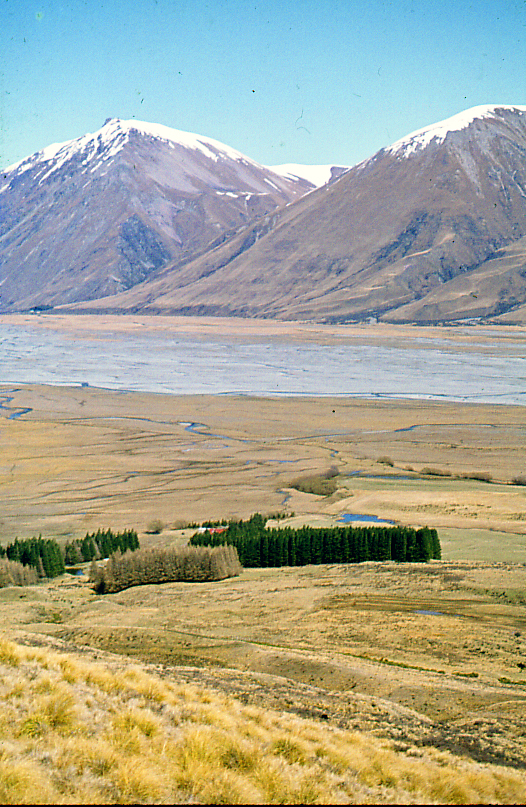
Lilybank Station and the Godley River, 1977

Allan David Dick QSO (1 September 1915 – 15 March 1992) was a New Zealand politician of the National Party.

== Biography ==
New Zealand Parliament
Years	Term	Electorate	Party
1962–1963	33rd	Waitaki	National
1963–1966	34th	Waitaki	National
1966–1969	35th	Waitaki	National
1969–1972	36th	Oamaru	National

Dick was born in 1915 at Dunedin. He received his education at Otago Boys' High School. After school, he farmed at North Otago, Kurow and then Lilybank Station at the head of Lake Tekapo in the McKenzie Country. He bought Lilybank in 1937.

In 1962, he won the 1962 Waitaki by-election, after the sudden death of the Hon. Thomas Hayman, who had been an MP from 1949. He was one of six candidates for the National nomination in this largely rural and safe National seat. He represented the Waitaki electorate to 1969, and then the Oamaru electorate from 1969 to 1972, when he was defeated. He was one of four National Party incumbents from Otago and Southland who lost their normally blue electorate to the Labour challenger over the proposed raising of the lake levels of lakes Manapouri and Te Anau, which was opposed by the Save Manapouri campaign. Labour's election manifesto was for the lakes to remain at their natural levels.

Dick held various positions outside parliament. He was a foundation member of the Mount Cook National Park Board. For a time, he chaired the Tekapo Town Planning Committee, and he was a chairman of the Waitaki Lakes Committee. He was chairman of the Mackenzie branch of Federated Farmers. He was appointed a Companion of the Queen's Service Order for community service in the 1981 Queen's Birthday Honours, and was awarded the New Zealand 1990 Commemoration Medal in 1990.

Dick died in Oamaru on 15 March 1992. His wife, Betty Dick, wrote a book High Country Family (Reed, Wellington, 1964) about their life on Lilybank Station, and the changes when he became an MP. They had four sons and one daughter.

== Notes ==
New Zealand Parliament
Preceded by Thomas Hayman	Member of Parliament for Waitaki; 1962–1969	In abeyance Title next held by Jonathan Elworthy
In abeyance Title last held by Thomas Hayman	Member of Parliament for Oamaru; 1969–1972	Succeeded by Bill Laney
