= 1880 Waitaki by-election =

New Zealand by-election

The 1880 Waitaki by-election was a by-election held on 16 June 1880 in the Waitaki electorate in the Otago and Canterbury regions during the 7th New Zealand Parliament.

The by-election was caused by the resignation of the incumbent Thomas William Hislop, on 28 April 1880.

The by-election was won by George Jones. Jones and William Henry Sherwood Roberts were described as Liberals; John Reid and Duncan Sutherland were described as Conservatives.

== Results ==
1880 Waitaki by-election
Party	Candidate	Votes	%	±%
Independent	George Jones	775	47.26	
Independent	John Reid	666	40.61	
Independent	William Henry Sherwood Roberts	168	10.24	
Majority		109	6.65	
Informal votes		31	1.89	
Turnout		1640		
