= Alfred Davey (New Zealand politician) =

New Zealand politician

Alfred James Davey (29 March 1888 – 2 October 1961) was a New Zealand politician of the National Party. He was a farmer in South Canterbury and involved in many community organisations.

== Biography ==
New Zealand Parliament
Years	Term	Electorate	Party
1954–1957	31st	Waimate	National

Davey was born on 29 March 1888 in Rangatira Valley inland from Temuka. (Note: Jim Wilson, in New Zealand parliamentary record: 1840–1984, recorded his year of birth as 1886. (Note: Wilson) This was repeated in Gustafson's The First 50 Years : A History of the New Zealand National Party. This is wrong as in both his obituary in The Press and on his gravestone at Timaru Cemetery, his age at death was given as 73 years. It is therefore assumed that the date of birth given in Guy Scholefield's 1951 Who's Who in New Zealand is correct.) After school, he farmed in nearby Waitohi. Davey was involved in many community groups in South Canterbury. With the Farmers' Union, he presided over the Temuka branch for many years, belonged to the executive of the South Canterbury district, and was its representative on the Dominion executive. Davey held a directorship on the Midland Dairy Company. He had a particular interest in education. He is the author of histories of the Geraldine County and of the Timaru Choral Society. He was elected onto Geraldine County Council in the 1938 New Zealand local elections. He subsequently became chairperson of the county council for 10 years and a member of the Timaru Harbour Board for 13 years.

Davey was a member of the Presbyterian Church in Timaru and active as an elder at St Paul's church in the Timaru suburb of Highfield.

In 1953, he was awarded the Queen Elizabeth II Coronation Medal.

He won the Waimate electorate in 1954 for the National Party after the previous member, David Campbell Kidd, had died shortly before the election. The electorate was abolished in 1957, and Davey was defeated standing for Timaru by Clyde Carr of the Labour Party, who had been the electorate's representative since 1928. Davey sought the Timaru National Party candidacy for the 1960 election but was beaten by Ronald Erle White, a former mayor of Timaru.

Davey died on 2 October 1961 in Timaru.
