= Waihemo (electorate) =

Waihemo is a former parliamentary electorate in the Otago region of New Zealand. It existed for two periods (1887–1890 and 1893–1902) and was represented by two Members of Parliament.

== Population centres ==
In the 1887 electoral redistribution, although the Representation Commission was required through the Representation Act 1887 to maintain existing electorates "as far as possible", rapid population growth in the North Island required the transfer of three seats from the South Island to the north. Ten new electorates were created, including Waihemo, and one former electorate was recreated.

== History ==
The electorate existed from 1887 to 1890 and 1893 to 1902. It was based on the small town of Waihemo, now called Dunback.

The 1887 election was contested by John McKenzie and John Buckland. McKenzie had previously represented Moeraki and Buckland had represented Waikouaiti. McKenzie and Buckland received 493 and 422 votes, respectively. McKenzie represented the electorate until 1890, when it was abolished.

The electorate was recreated for the next 1893 general election and John McKenzie was again elected. He was reconfirmed at the next two general elections, but resigned in 1900. This caused the 18 July 1900 Waihemo by-election, which was won by Thomas Mackenzie. He served until the end of the parliamentary term in 1902, when the electorate was again abolished.

=== Members of parliament ===
Waihemo was represented by two Members of Parliament.

Key

Independent Liberal Independent Liberal

Election	Winner
1887 election	John McKenzie
(Electorate abolished 1890–1893)
1893 election	John McKenzie
1896 election	John McKenzie
1899 election	John McKenzie
1900 by-election	Thomas Mackenzie

== Election results ==
=== 1900 by-election ===
1900 Waihemo by-election
Party	Candidate	Votes	%	±%
Independent Liberal	Thomas Mackenzie	1,854	64.21	
Liberal	William Guffie	1,008	34.91	
Informal votes		25	0.86	
Majority		846	29.30	
Turnout		2,887	65.16	
Registered electors		4,430		

=== 1899 election ===
1899 general election: Waihemo
Party	Candidate	Votes	%	±%
Liberal	John McKenzie	Unopposed		
Registered electors		4,430		
