= Waimate (electorate) =

Waimate was a parliamentary electorate in the Canterbury region of New Zealand from 1881 to 1893 and from 1946 to 1957. It was represented by three Members of Parliament.

== Population centres ==
The previous electoral redistribution was undertaken in 1875 for the 1875–1876 election. In the six years since, New Zealand's European population had increased by 65%. In the 1881 electoral redistribution, the House of Representatives increased the number of European representatives to 91 (up from 84 since the 1875–76 election). The number of Māori electorates was held at four. The House further decided that electorates should not have more than one representative, which led to 35 new electorates being formed, including Waimate, and two electorates that had previously been abolished to be recreated. This necessitated a major disruption to existing boundaries. The area for the electorate was in its entirety from the Gladstone electorate, which continued to exist with a much reduced geographic size. The southern boundary of the electorate was the Waitaki River, and the electorate was centred on the town of Waimate.

In the 1887 electoral redistribution, the electorate shifted north and became much smaller. It now shared a boundary with the Timaru electorate. The Representation Act 1887 wrote the country quota into legislation and the Waimate electorate was classed as 100% rural (i.e. Waimate Borough had a population of less than 2,000 people at that time).

The 1941 New Zealand census had been postponed due to World War II, so the 1946 electoral redistribution had to take ten years of population growth and movements into account. The North Island gained a further two electorates from the South Island due to faster population growth. The abolition of the country quota through the Electoral Amendment Act, 1945 reduced the number and increased the size of rural electorates. None of the existing electorates remained unchanged, 27 electorates were abolished, 19 electorates were created for the first time, and eight former electorates were re-established, including Waimate.

After years of political tension, the National Government came to an agreement with the Labour Party on the redistribution provisions of the electoral law. This resulted in the 1956 Electoral Act, which significantly changed the composition of the Representation Commission; since then, there has been one member representing the government, and one the opposition, apart from all the official members. Tolerance to the electoral quota was reduced again to 5%. The 1957 electoral redistribution made an adjustments in the number of electorates between the South and North Islands, with Waimate in the South Island abolished and Piako in the North Island reconstituted. Combined with significant population redistributions within the islands, the boundaries of all but two electorates were altered. These changes took effect with the 1957 election.

== History ==
Waimate existed from 1881 to 1893 and from 1946 to 1957.

=== Members of Parliament ===
The electorate was represented by three Members of Parliament:

Key

Independent Liberal National

Election	Winner
1881 election	William Steward
1884 election	William Steward
1887 election	William Steward
1890 election	William Steward
electorate abolished 1893–1946
1946 election	David Kidd
1949 election	David Kidd
1951 election	David Kidd
1954 election	Alfred Davey
(Electorate abolished 1957; see Timaru)

== Election results ==
=== 1954 election ===
1954 general election: Waimate
Party	Candidate	Votes	%	±%
National	Alfred Davey	6,576	49.85	
Labour	Neville Pickering	4,238	32.13	
Social Credit	Maurice Hayes	2,375	18.00	+15.34
Majority		1,438	10.90	
Turnout		13,189	99.48	+7.46
Registered electors		13,257		

=== 1951 election ===
1951 general election: Waimate
Party	Candidate	Votes	%	±%
National	David Kidd	7,526	53.58	+2.24
Labour	A G Braddick	5,024	35.77	
Ind. Social Credit	Maurice Hayes	374	2.66	+1.03
Majority		2,232	15.89	+2.61
Turnout		12,924	92.02	+2.71
Registered electors		14,044		

=== 1949 election ===
1949 general election: Waimate
Party	Candidate	Votes	%	±%
National	David Kidd	7,426	55.82	+2.80
Labour	William Roy Davison	5,659	42.54	−4.43
Independent	Maurice Hayes	217	1.63	
Majority		1,767	13.28	+7.42
Turnout		13,302	94.73	−0.01
Registered electors		14,041		

=== 1946 election ===
1946 general election: Waimate
Party	Candidate	Votes	%	±%
National	David Kidd	6,922	53.02	
Labour	William Roy Davison	6,133	46.97	
Majority		789	6.04	
Turnout		13,055	94.74	
Registered electors		13,779		

=== 1890 election ===
1890 general election: Waimate
Party	Candidate	Votes	%	±%
Liberal	William Steward	747	62.35	
Independent	Alpheus Hayes	451	37.65	
Majority		296	24.71	
Turnout		1,198	44.47	
Registered electors		2,694		
