= John Ewing (goldminer) =

New Zealand goldminer

John Ewing (3 November 1844 – 30 August 1922) was a New Zealand goldminer, entrepreneur, and mining engineer. He was referred to as 'Big John Ewing', the 'Gold Baron' or the 'Mining Monarch'.

== Life ==
Ewing was born in Bonhill, Dunbartonshire, Scotland on 3 November 1844. His father was a manufacturer. He emigrated to New Zealand in 1863, joining the Otago goldrush. Ewing mined at Gabriel's Gully and Fourteen Mile Beach before settling at Dunstan Creek goldfield in Saint Bathans. Ewing was an early adopter of mining technology such as hydraulic mining, and was a founding shareholder of the Scandinavian Water Race Company, which provided water to miners at St Bathans. In 1884 Ewing unsuccessfully stood against Scobie Mackenzie for the Mount Ida electorate.

Ewing was referred to as 'Big John Ewing', the 'Gold Baron' or the 'Mining Monarch'.

== Later life ==
Ewing died on 30 August 1922 in the Chalet Hospital at Dunedin, survived by his wife, Mary Frances Ewing. He is buried in Dunedin's Andersons Bay cemetery.
