= Robert Campbell (New Zealand politician) =

New Zealand politician

New Zealand Parliament
Years	Term	Electorate	Party
1866–1869	4th	Oamaru	Independent

Robert Campbell (8 January 1843 – 10 December 1889) was a 19th-century New Zealand Member of Parliament representing Oamaru (Otago).

Born near London, the son of Robert "Tertius" Campbell, he came to New Zealand in 1860. On 2 December 1868 in Christchurch, he married Emma Josephine Hawdon, the eldest daughter of Joseph Hawdon, a member of the New Zealand Legislative Council. (His wife's sister later married Edward Wingfield Humphreys.)

He represented the Oamaru electorate from 1866 to 9 April 1869, when he resigned. He was appointed to the Legislative Council on 13 May 1870 and served on it until he died on 10 December 1889.

== Notes ==
New Zealand Parliament
New constituency	Member of Parliament for Oamaru; 1866–1869	Succeeded by Charles Christie Graham
