= Bill Laney =

New Zealand politician

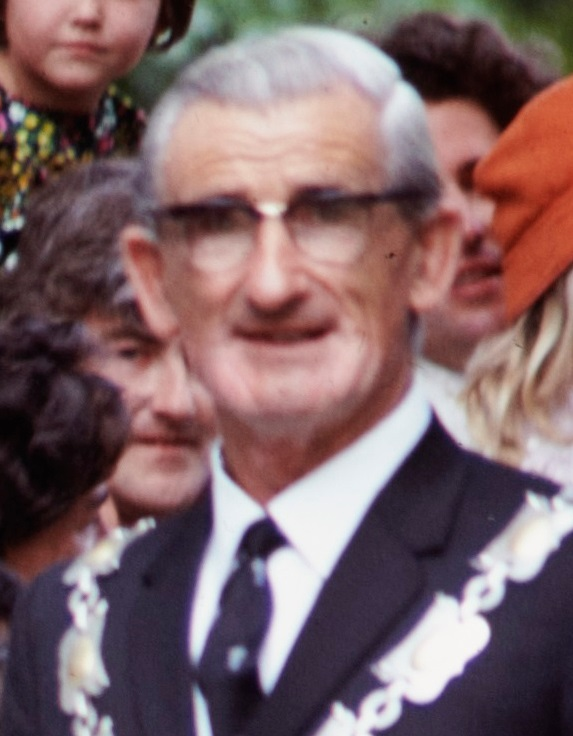
- Laney in 1974

Member of the New Zealand Parliament for Oamaru
- In office 25 November 1972 – 29 November 1975
- Preceded by: Allan Dick
- Succeeded by: Jonathan Elworthy

Personal details
- Born: William Ross Laney; 4 May 1913 Weston, New Zealand
- Died: 7 August 1998 (aged 85) Christchurch, New Zealand
- Party: Labour
- Profession: Teacher

William Ross Laney (4 May 1913 – 7 August 1998) was a New Zealand Member of Parliament representing the Labour Party, and Mayor of Oamaru.

== Biography ==
=== Early life and career ===
Laney was born in 1913 in Weston. He graduated from the University of Otago with a BA in 1937. He was also a New Zealand Universities rugby and cricket blue and later Otago rugby captain. Laney then became a teacher of agriculture at Waitaki Boys' High School.

=== Political career ===
New Zealand Parliament
Years	Term	Electorate	Party
1972–1975	37th	Oamaru	Labour

Laney's political career began in 1951 when he was elected as a member of the Oamaru Borough Council in a by-election. He was then Mayor of Oamaru for 18 years from 1956 to 1974. From 1945 until 1956 he was an executive member of the Oamaru branch of the National Party but he resigned to join the Labour Party in order to contest the mayoralty. His resignation did not endear him to the local National Party faithful. This was compounded by the fact that the incumbent mayor he defeated, Michael Francis Edward Cooney, was a prominent member of the local National Party.

Laney contested the Oamaru electorate in the 1972 election, and defeated the incumbent, National's Allan Dick by a 390 votes majority. At the next election in 1975, he was in turn defeated by National's Jonathan Elworthy. Laney was described as a man of integrity not prepared to compromise his principles and opposed the influence liquor industry lobbyists had over politicians during his time as an MP.

After losing his seat in Parliament Laney stood for the Oamaru mayoralty once again at the 1977 local elections, but was beaten by the deputy mayor Reginald James Denny by 1,415 votes. A year later at the 1978 election, he stood for Labour in Waitaki (Oamaru having been abolished) where he again finished runner-up to Elworthy.

=== Later life and death ===
In 1990 he was awarded the New Zealand 1990 Commemoration Medal.

Laney died on 7 August 1998 in Christchurch.

== Notes ==
New Zealand Parliament
Preceded by Allan Dick	Member of Parliament for Oamaru; 1972–1975	Succeeded by Jonathan Elworthy
Political offices
Preceded by Frank Cooney	Mayor of Oamaru; 1956–1974	Succeeded by Rex Douglas Allen
