= Thomas Hayman =

New Zealand politician

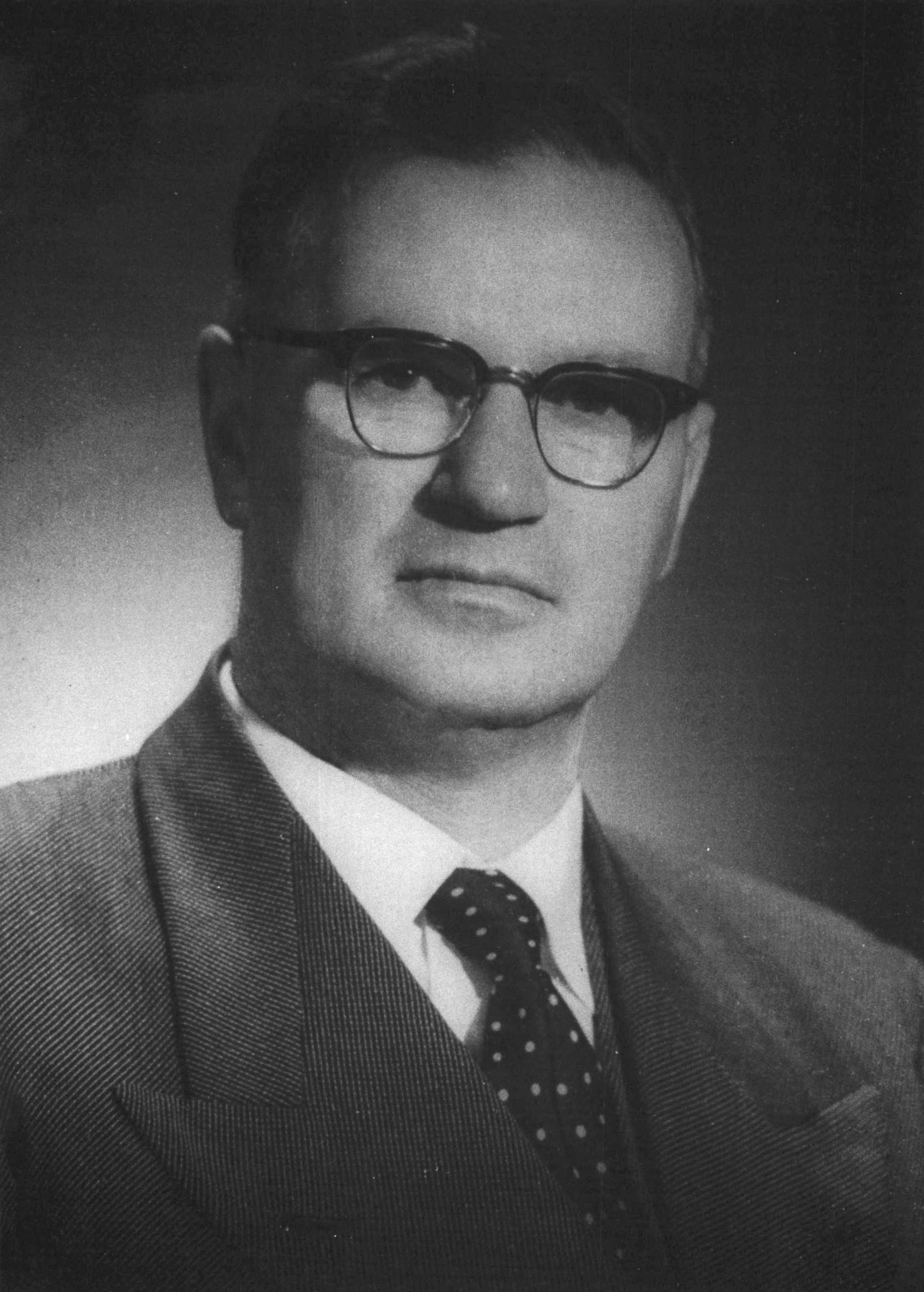
Portrait of Hayman

Thomas Leonard Hayman (24 May 1904 – 2 January 1962) was a New Zealand politician of the National Party and a farmer.

== Biography ==
New Zealand Parliament
Years	Term	Electorate	Party
1949–1951	29th	Oamaru	National
1951–1954	30th	Oamaru	National
1954–1957	31st	Oamaru	National
1957–1960	32nd	Waitaki	National
1960–1962	33rd	Waitaki	National

Hayman was born in 1904 in Willowbridge near Waimate. He received his education at Nukuroa School and Waimate High School, and left school aged 17 to help on the family farm. Between 1926 and 1945, he worked as a contractor in farming. He was active with several organisations, including the South Canterbury Power Board (where he served as deputy-chairman), chairman of the South Canterbury Federated Farmers, and treasurer of the Methodist Church Trust at Nukuroa. From 1941 to 1949, he was director of the Studholme sale yards.

He represented the electorates of Oamaru from 1949 to 1957, and then Waitaki from 1957 to 1962, when he died. In 1949, he defeated Labour's Arnold Nordmeyer.

He was a cabinet minister from 1960 to 1962; Postmaster-General from 12 December 1960 to 2 May 1961, then Minister of Agriculture from 2 May 1961 until 2 January 1962.

In 1953, Hayman was awarded the Queen Elizabeth II Coronation Medal.

Hayman died suddenly of a heart attack on 2 January 1962.

== Notes ==
Political offices
Preceded by William Gillespie	Minister of Agriculture; 1961–1962	Succeeded by Brian Talboys
Preceded by Mick Moohan	Postmaster-General; 1960–1961	Succeeded by Arthur Kinsella
New Zealand Parliament
Preceded by Arnold Nordmeyer	Member of Parliament for Oamaru; 1949–1957	In abeyance Title next held by Allan Dick
In abeyance Title last held by David Campbell Kidd	Member of Parliament for Waitaki; 1957–1962	Succeeded by Allan Dick
