= David Campbell Kidd =

New Zealand politician

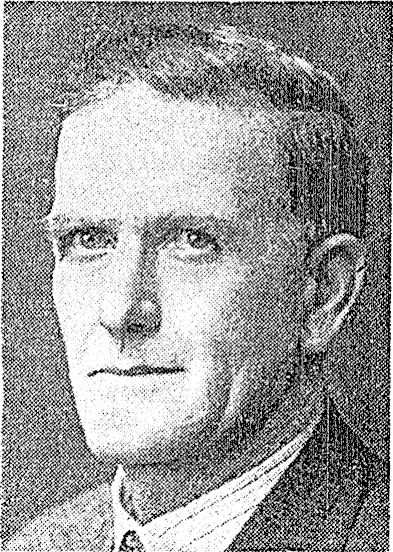

David Campbell Kidd (29 September 1889 – 23 September 1954) was a New Zealand politician of the National Party.

== Early life ==
Kidd was born in 1889 in Shag Point, Otago and received his education at Albany Street Public School in Dunedin. Together with his brother Peter, he worked on and later managed his father's farm, 'Moss Vale', Mt Nessing Road, Albury. He played rugby for the Albury club before the Great War. He went into World War I with the South Canterbury Mounted Rifles and was wounded in the Battle of Gaza in 1917. After the war, he took up a farm as a crown lease at 'Single Hill" Burkes Pass. In 1940 he purchased 'Manahune' in the Te Ngawai district of Albury.

== Political career ==
New Zealand Parliament
Years	Term	Electorate	Party
1938–1943	26th	Waitaki	National
1943–1946	27th	Waitaki	National
1946–1949	28th	Waimate	National
1949–1951	29th	Waimate	National
1951–1954	30th	Waimate	National

Kidd became the first Dominion president of the Crown Tenants' Association, and was also represented on the Canterbury Land Board, and the Timaru Harbour Board.

In the 1938 election, Kidd won the Waitaki electorate from Labour's David Barnes by just 14 votes. He held the electorate at the next election in 1943. The Waitaki electorate was abolished for the 1946 election, and Kidd successfully stood in the Waimate electorate instead. He was again elected in 1949 and 1951.

In 1953, Kidd was awarded the Queen Elizabeth II Coronation Medal. He died on 23 September 1954 in Kimberley, South Africa, while returning from a Commonwealth Parliamentary Association conference in Nairobi, Kenya. As it was less than two months before the 1954 election, a by-election was not necessary. He was succeeded by National's Alfred Davey.

== Personal life ==
Kidd married Anne Elizabeth 'Nan' Stirling in 1919. Anne died in 1940 aged 43. They had two children together. He later married Bessie Loy, who outlived him.

== Notes ==
New Zealand Parliament
Preceded by David Barnes	Member of Parliament for Waitaki; 1938–1946	In abeyance Title next held by Thomas Hayman
New constituency	Member of Parliament for Waimate; 1946–1954	Succeeded by Alfred Davey
