= John McKenzie (New Zealand politician) =

New Zealand politician (1839–1901)

The Honourable Sir John McKenzie KCMG
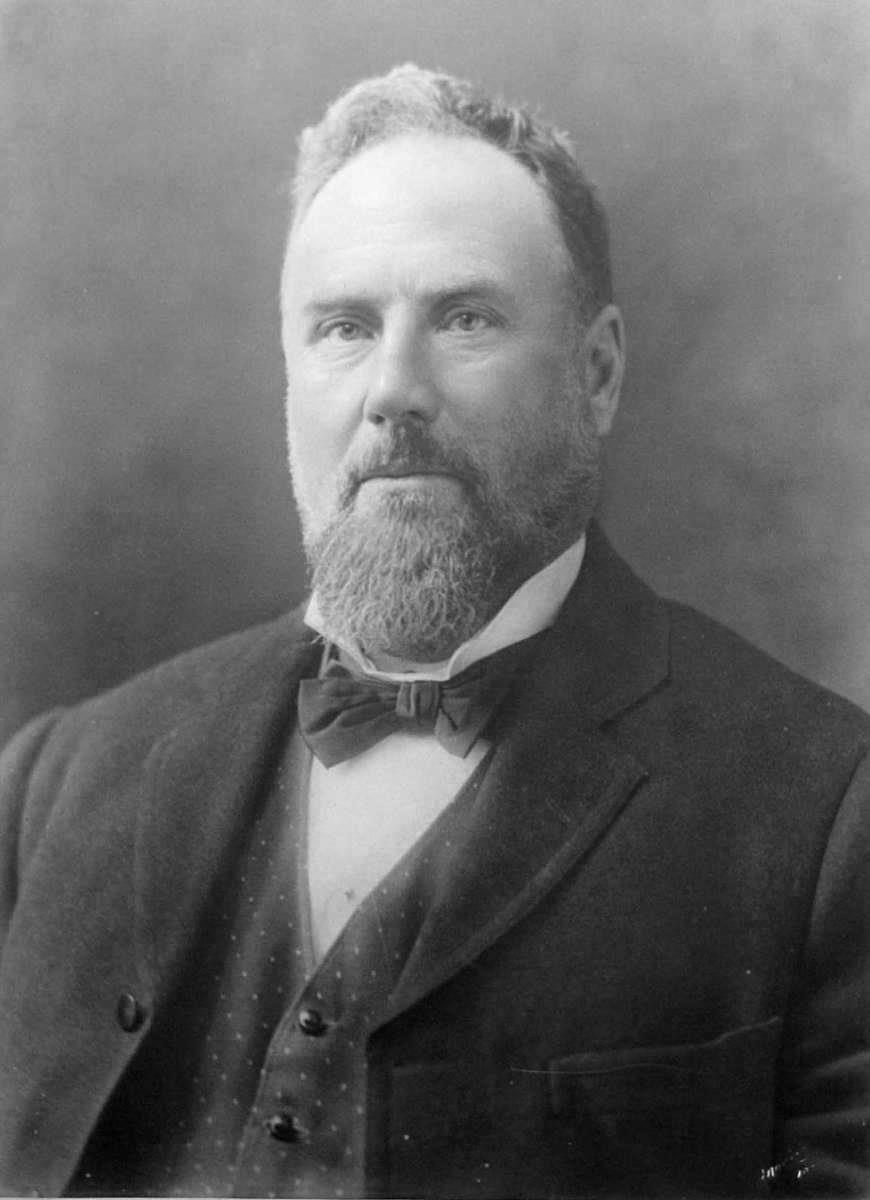

19th Minister of Lands
- In office 24 January 1891 – 27 June 1900
- Prime Minister: John Ballance; Richard Seddon
- Preceded by: George Richardson
- Succeeded by: Tom Duncan

14th Minister of Immigration
- In office 24 January 1891 – 2 March 1896
- Prime Minister: John Ballance; Richard Seddon
- Preceded by: George Richardson
- Succeeded by: William Campbell Walker

Personal details
- Born: 6 October 1839 Ardross, Scotland
- Died: 6 August 1901 (aged 61) Palmerston, New Zealand
- Party: Liberal
- Spouse: Ann Munro
- Children: Five
- Profession: Farmer

Sir John McKenzie KCMG (6 October 1839 – 6 August 1901) was a New Zealand politician. He served as Minister of Lands and Agriculture in the Liberal Government of John Ballance.

== Early life ==
McKenzie was born in Ardross, Scotland, the son of a small tenant farmer, and while young saw the hardships caused by the Highland Clearances. When he was five-years-old in May 1845 the McKenzie was woken before dawn by his father and walked on a 16-mile journey to a small Presbyterian church at Croick. En route (despite his age) McKenzie witnessed the former inhabitants of the nearby Glencalvie estate huddled together in a graveyard after they had been evicted from their homes by an exploitative landlord. This is something he never forgot and the memory would shape the attitudes and actions of his life subsequently.

As a teenager McKenzie was farming with his father was farming at Baldoon where they also hired two further employees regularly. He commenced a typical rural apprenticeship, starting out as a shepherd before progressing incrementally to run a croft and eventually operating a leasehold farm of his own. While still relatively young he fathered a daughter (Johan McKenzie, who was born on 23 June 1859) out of wedlock which made his social life awkward. He would later publicly accept sole custody for his daughter and gave her his surname to partially removed the stigma of her illegitimacy. Soon after he married Ann Munro, a widow six years his senior, 23 May 1860 at Dingwall shortly before they emigrated to New Zealand.

He arrived in Otago in September 1860, where he eventually began working for runholder Johnny Jones in Waikouaiti. His skill and experience with farming in the hilly country there, which was very reminiscent to those in Scotland, saw him promoted rapidly and by 1863 he was managing a giant run at Puketapu for Jones. After just two years he had saved enough money to achieve the independence he had always dreamed of. He purchased a 76-acre property of ordinary land just north of Palmerston valued at 10 shillings an acre which he named Ardross after his hometown.

== Member of Parliament ==
New Zealand Parliament
Years	Term	Electorate	Party
1881–1884	8th	Moeraki	Independent
1884–1887	9th	Moeraki	Independent
1887–1890	10th	Waihemo	Independent
1890–1893	11th	Waitaki	Liberal
1893–1896	12th	Waihemo	Liberal
1896–1899	13th	Waihemo	Liberal
1899–1900	14th	Waihemo	Liberal

He was elected to the Bushey Road Board as clerk and treasurer in 1865 and likewise served as secretary on the Palmerston school committee for that same year. McKenzie then ran for election to the Otago Provincial Council in 1868 for Waikouaiti, but was defeated. He was later elected for Waihemo in 1871. In-between his first election defeat and subsequent election, he assiduously practised delivering speeches in English (rather than Gaelic) and studied everything he could find concerning land laws. His scrupulousness paid off when he was able to defeat John Douglas, a rich and well-known landowner, who was much better educated than McKenzie and a far more proficient public speaker. Initially he was an ally of Donald Reid, but soon fell out with him after Reid's land policies proved to be insufficiently radical in McKenzie's eyes. He did develop a partnership with future Prime Minister Robert Stout during this period however.

From 1881 to 1900 he served in the New Zealand Parliament; for the Otago electorates of Moeraki, then Waihemo (1887), Waitaki (1890), and Waihemo again from 1893 to 1900, when he resigned due to ill-health.

McKenzie's early parliamentary career was undistinguished, though he did earn a reputation as an authoritative speaker on land issues. He supported his friend Stout in forming a government and was the government whip for the duration of the Stout–Vogel Ministry from 1884 to 1887. McKenzie quipped that his experiences as a hill-country shepherd provided him an ideal training ground for the job of a parliamentary whip. After the government was defeated, it was left leaderless in opposition as Stout lost his seat and Sir Julius Vogel retired from parliament in 1888. Opposition MPs were in Parliament were in a quandary. To address this, the opposition held a caucus to address the question of leadership. It resulted not to elect a new leader, but instead it decided on a collective leadership concept, and elected a committee to co-ordinate its parliamentary operation. It consisted of McKenzie, John Ballance, James Dupré Lance, Oliver Samuel, Richard Seddon, William Steward and Frederick Moss as well as the two opposition whips; William Campbell Walker and Frederick Fitchett. This situation lasted until Ballance was elected a permanent Leader of the Opposition in 1889.

He served as Minister of Lands from 1891 to 1900 in the Liberal Government. He was also Minister of Agriculture (1891–1900), Minister of Immigration (1891–1896) and Commissioner of Forests (1893–1900). He oversaw many land reforms, favouring small family farmers and the opening up of land for closer settlement. There were four things in particular he achieved during the government; he incorporated a graduated land tax into Ballance's Land and Income Assessment Act 1891, including the lease-in-perpetuity tenure (or 999-year lease) as a major feature of the Land Act 1892, purchasing the Cheviot Hills estate in 1893 and introducing the state's right of compulsory purchase under the auspices of the Land for Settlements Act 1894.

On 17 May 1901, he was appointed a member of the New Zealand Legislative Council.

== Later life and death ==
He was knighted as a Knight Commander of the Order of St Michael and St George (KCMG) in June 1901, on the occasion of the visit of TRH the Duke and Duchess of Cornwall and York (later King George V and Queen Mary) to New Zealand, and died of bladder cancer only six weeks later on 6 August 1901.

An elaborate funeral was given to McKenzie including pipers playing Flowers of the Forest with people openly weeping. McKenzie's biographer deemed the choice of music "...an appropriate choice of lament because lost battles of the past had prompted McKenzie to win a bigger victory in the Britain of the South [New Zealand]." He was buried in Palmerston cemetery.

== Memorial ==
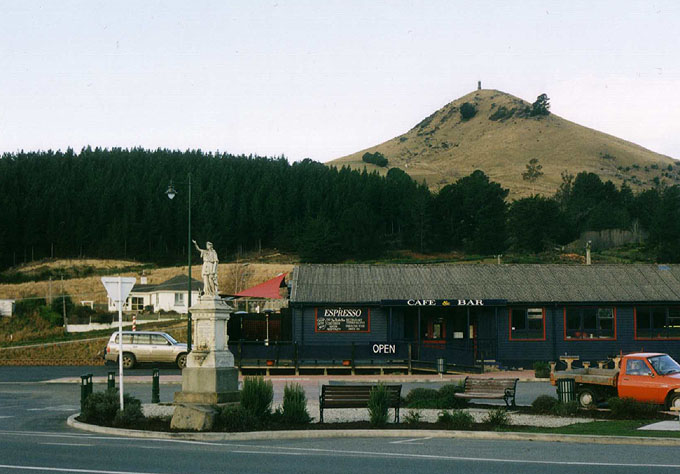
The McKenzie cairn is visible on the top of Puketapu, the hill to the right of the picture

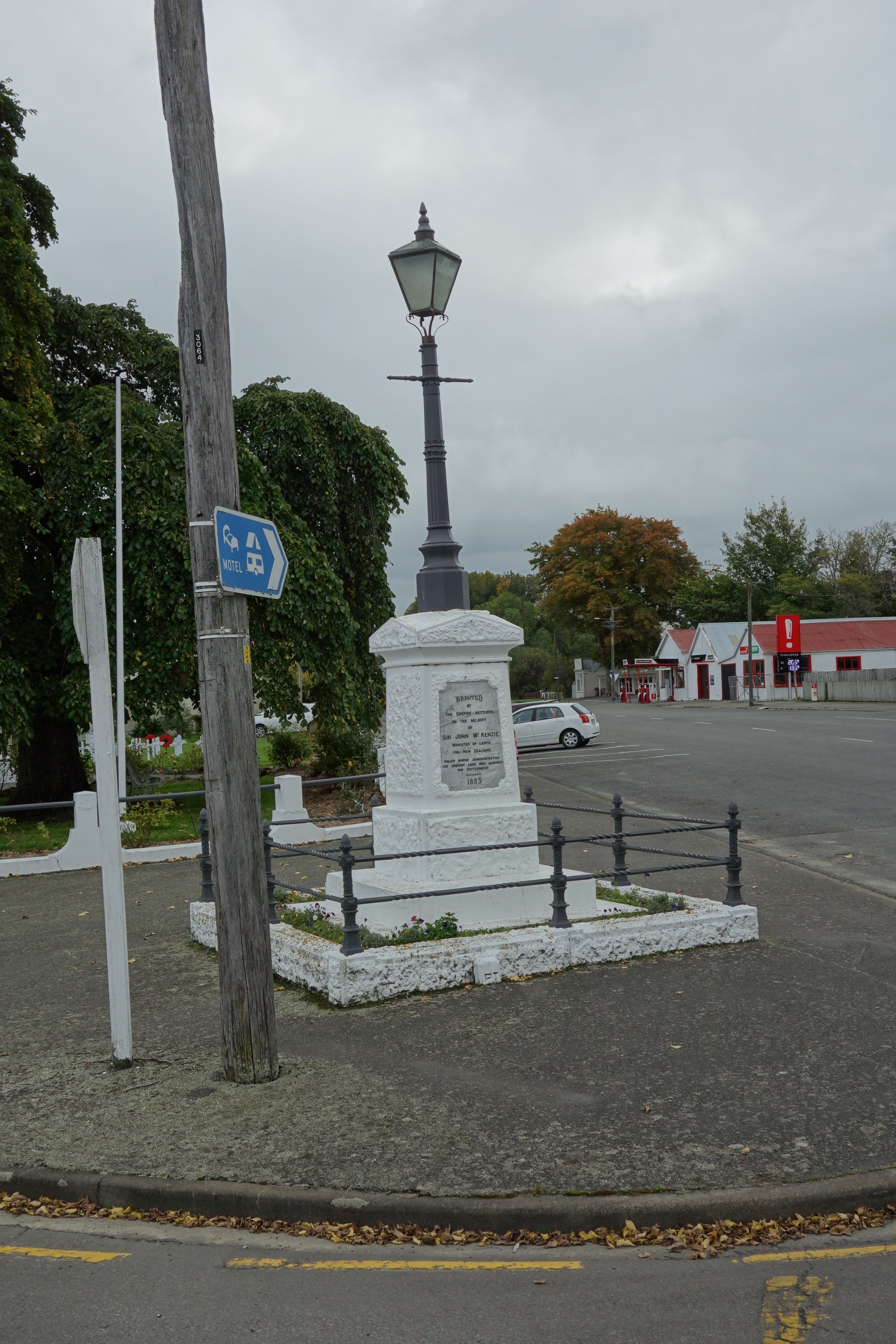
The McKenzie Memorial in Cheviot

There is a memorial cairn to McKenzie on top of Puketapu, a prominent hill close to Palmerston in Otago. This cairn, erected in 1929 by Sir Joseph Ward, replaced an earlier cairn on another nearby hill in Pukehiwitahi, overlooking his first farm, which was erected in 1902, but quickly fell into disrepair.

A second memorial was erected in the North Canterbury town of Cheviot to recognise his role in breaking up William "Ready Money" Robinson's large Cheviot Hills estate into smaller farms and the town.

== Notes ==
Political offices
Preceded by George Richardson	Minister of Lands; 1891–1900	Succeeded by Tom Duncan
Preceded by George Richardson	Minister of Agriculture; 1891–1900	Succeeded by Tom Duncan
Preceded by George Richardson	Minister of Immigration; 1891–1896	Succeeded by William Campbell Walker
New Zealand Parliament
Preceded by Tom Duncan	Member of Parliament for Waitaki; 1890–1893	Succeeded by William Steward
