= Thomas William Hislop =

New Zealand politician (1850–1925)

The Honourable Thomas William Hislop
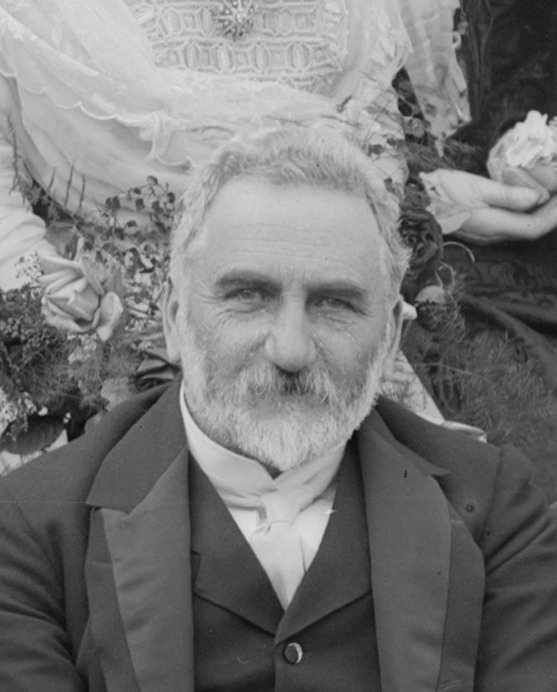
- Portrait of Thomas Hislop in 1908

New Zealand Legislative Council
- In office 2 September 1921 – 2 October 1925

21st Colonial Secretary of New Zealand
- In office 8 October 1887 – 10 September 1889
- Governor: William Jervois; James Prendergast (acting); The Earl of Onslow

8th Minister of Education
- In office 9 July 1889 – 10 September 1889
- In office 17 October 1889 – 24 January 1891

Member of the New Zealand Parliament for Waitaki
- In office 10 January 1876 – 28 April 1880

Member of the New Zealand Parliament for Oamaru
- In office 20 May 1885 – 3 October 1890

16th Mayor of Wellington
- In office 1905–1908
- Preceded by: John Aitken
- Succeeded by: Alfred Newman

Personal details
- Born: 8 April 1850 Kirknewton, Scotland
- Died: 2 October 1925 (aged 75) Wellington, New Zealand
- Resting place: Karori Cemetery, Wellington
- Spouse(s): Annie Hislop (née Simpson; m. 1873–1909); Louis Hislop (née Smith; m. 1922–1925)
- Children: Thomas Hislop
- Education: University of Otago
- Occupation: barrister and solicitor; politician
- Cabinet: Atkinson Ministry, 1887–1891

Thomas William Hislop (8 April 1850 – 2 October 1925) was the Mayor of Wellington from 1905 to 1908, and had represented two South Island electorates in the New Zealand Parliament.

== Early life ==
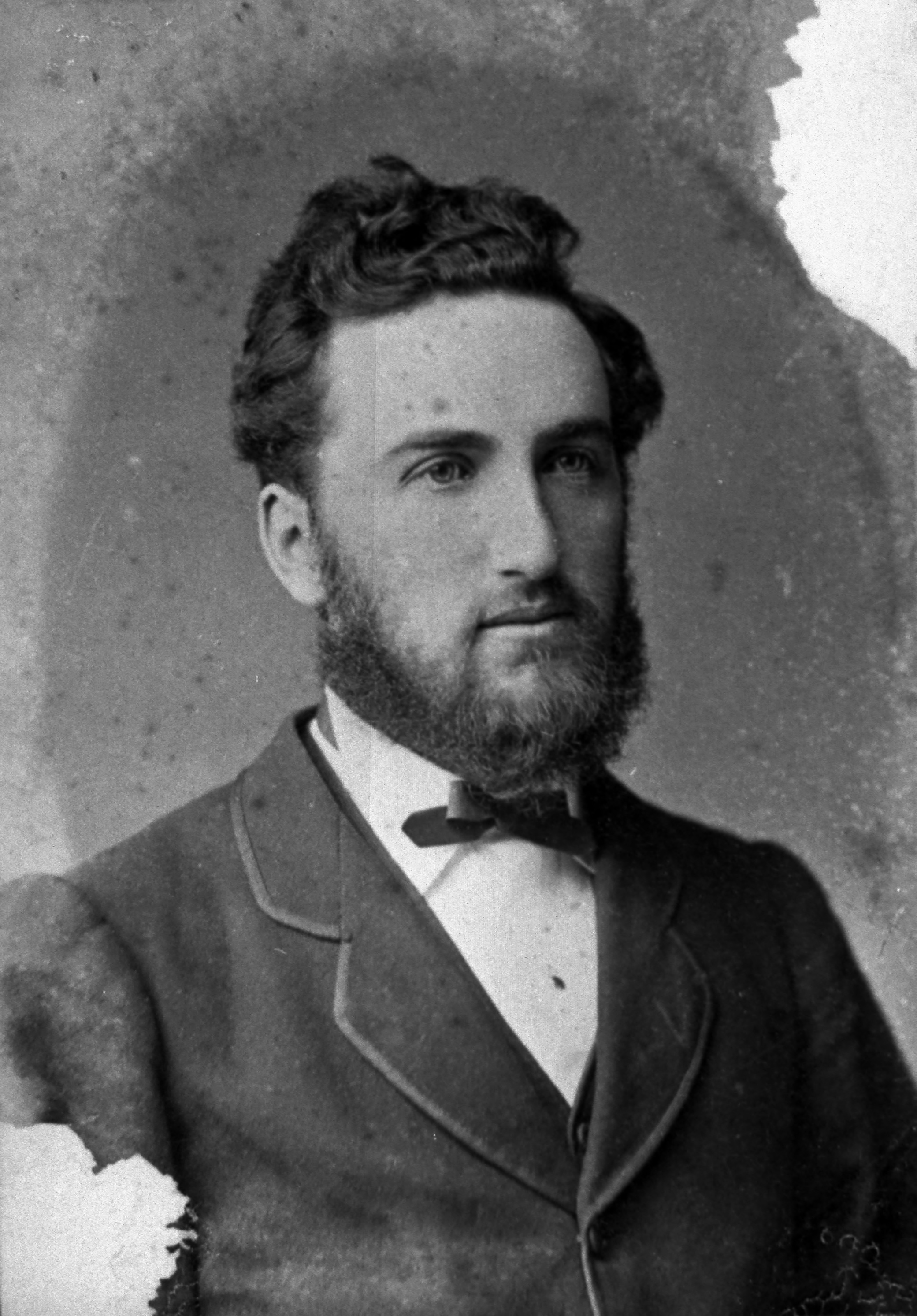
Portrait of Thomas Hislop in 1878

Hislop was born in Kirknewton, West Lothian, Scotland, in 1850. His father John Hislop was the first secretary for the Department of Education in New Zealand. The family left Scotland in 1856 on the Strathmore and landed in Port Chalmers. They settled in East Taieri. Hislop was educated by his father until the age of twelve, and then attended John Shaw's Grammar School (Albany Street, Dunedin), Dunedin High School and the University of Otago, where he studied law. He was admitted as a barrister and solicitor in 1871, only a few months after his teacher from Shaw's Grammar, Robert Stout (who later became Premier and then Chief Justice). He practised as a lawyer in Oamaru (in a firm where he was a colleague of Stout), living there until 1890. After his 1890 election defeat he moved to Wellington, where he became a partner in the legal firm of Brandon and Hislop (later Brandon, Hislop and Johnston) with Alfred Brandon.

== Political career ==
New Zealand Parliament
Years	Term	Electorate	Party
1876–1879	6th	Waitaki	Independent
1879–1880	7th	Waitaki	Independent
1885–1887	9th	Oamaru	Independent
1887–1889	10th	Oamaru	Independent
1889–1890	10th	Oamaru	Independent

Hislop was first elected for the Waitaki electorate in the 1876 general election, and was re-elected in 1879. He resigned on 28 April 1880 "for private reasons". He then represented Oamaru from an 1885 by-election to 1889, when he resigned from his two ministerial portfolios (effective 10 September 1889) and his parliamentary seat (effective 4 September 1889) over the Ward–Hislop Affair. He won the resulting 1889 by-election, but was defeated by Tom Duncan at the next general election in 1890. He contested the 1896 general election in the Wellington Suburbs electorate, but was defeated by Thomas Wilford, with 2194 to 1942 votes. An election petition was filed one month after the election, accusing Wilford of bribery, illegal practices and not being properly registered as a voter himself. It was argued that only Hislop was properly registered, and should thus be returned. Wilford's election was declared invalid, but a by-election was called. Hislop declared that he would not stand in the by-election in favour of the opposition candidate Arthur Atkinson, who had come forth in the three-member Wellington electorate. Charles Wilson from the Liberal Party narrowly defeated Atkinson in the 1897 by-election.

Hislop was a member of the Atkinson Ministry from 1887 to 1891, holding posts as Colonial Secretary and Minister of Education. The education portfolio filled Hislop with great pleasure, as he was thus following in his father's footsteps, as he had been the author of the Education Act. Hislop drafted the Fair Rent Bill, which was introduced by the fifth Atkinson Ministry, and passed through the Lower House. He also introduced labour bills, factory and shop hours, and employers' liability bills, also building liens and the Truck Act, which, however, were not passed. He was successful in passing the Shipping and Seamen's Act. He also effected some useful legal reforms, and introduced the Representation Bill, a measure based on the Hare system, but this was withdrawn. Hislop's political views were on the left of the spectrum.

As a minister, he was involved in the 1889 Paris Exposition. For that, and for his services to education in general, he was honoured by the French Government with a Legion of Honour award.

Hislop unsuccessfully contested the three-member Wellington electorate in the 1899 election. He contested the Newtown electorate in the 1902 and 1905 elections. In 1902, the electorate was contested by William Henry Peter Barber, Hislop, Charles Luke, William Chapple and William George Tustin. They received 1385, 1357, 1100, 1017 and 159 votes, respectively. John Crewes had initially also contested the election, but he withdrew his nomination before polling day. The 1905 election was contested by William Henry Peter Barber, Hislop, William Chapple and Alfred Hindmarsh. They received 3231, 2018, 1795 and 383 votes, respectively.

Hislop was Mayor of Wellington from 1905 to 1908. Hiropi Street in Newtown is named after Hislop.

He was a Member of the Legislative Council from 1921 until his death.

== Family and death ==
Hislop's last residence was Sayes Court in Aurora Terrace, Wellington. It was once described as the "most valuable residential property in the city of Wellington".

Hislop married Annie Simpson on 18 February 1873 at Knox Church in Dunedin. They had two sons and three daughters. His first wife died in 1909. Their son Thomas Hislop was Mayor of Wellington from 1931 to 1944.

On 27 May 1922, at St Johns Church in Willis Street, Hislop married Marguerite Estelle Louis Smith (known as Louis Smith) of Wellington.

Hislop died on 2 October 1925 at his residence. He was buried at Karori Cemetery in Wellington on 5 October of that year. He was survived by his second wife and his children.

== List of honours ==
- Officier de la Légion d'Honneur (France)

== Notes ==
Government offices
Preceded by Patrick Buckley	Colonial Secretary of New Zealand; 1887–1889	Succeeded by William Russell
Political offices
Preceded by Harry Atkinson	Minister of Education; 1889–1891	Succeeded by William Pember Reeves
Preceded by John Aitken	Mayor of Wellington; 1905–1908	Succeeded by Alfred Newman
New Zealand Parliament
Preceded by William Steward	Member of Parliament for Waitaki; 1876–1880; Served alongside: Samuel Shrimski	Succeeded by George Jones
Preceded by Samuel Shrimski	Member of Parliament for Oamaru; 1885–1890	Succeeded by Tom Duncan
