= Tom Duncan (politician) =

New Zealand politician

The Honourable Tom Duncan
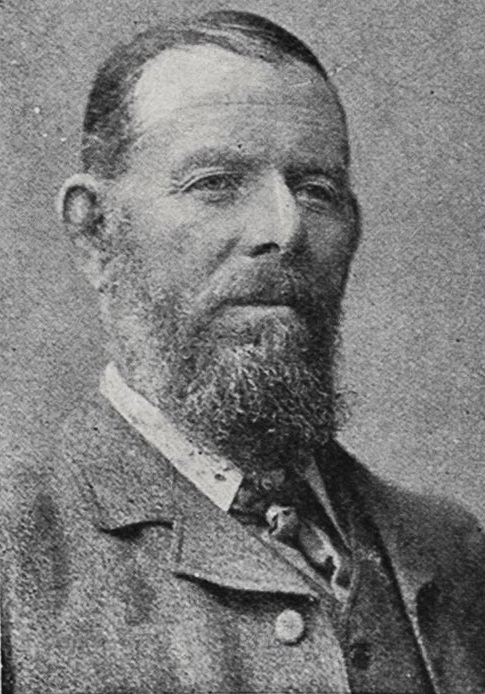

3rd Minister of Agriculture
- In office 2 July 1900 – 6 August 1906
- Prime Minister: Richard Seddon
- Preceded by: John McKenzie
- Succeeded by: Robert McNab

Member of the New Zealand Parliament for Oamaru
- In office 5 December 1890 – 7 December 1911
- Preceded by: Thomas William Hislop
- Succeeded by: Ernest Lee

New Zealand Legislative Councillor
- In office 13 June 1912 – 18 August 1914†
- Appointed by: Joseph Ward

Personal details
- Born: 1836 Plumbridge, Ireland
- Died: 18 August 1914 (aged 77–78) New Zealand
- Party: Liberal

Thomas Young Duncan (1836 – 18 August 1914), known as Tom and sometimes referred to as "Tam Duncan", was a New Zealand politician of the Liberal Party.

== Early life ==
Born at Plumbridge, County Tyrone, Ireland, in 1836, Duncan was educated at Castledamph National School. In 1858 he went to Victoria where he worked on the goldfields, and then in 1862 followed the gold rush to Central Otago in New Zealand. After little success, he began farming at Pukeuri, north of Oamaru, and lived there for the remainder of his life.

== Political career ==
New Zealand Parliament
Years	Term	Electorate	Party
1881–1884	8th	Waitaki	Independent
1884–1887	9th	Waitaki	Independent
1887–1890	10th	Waitaki	Independent
1890–1893	11th	Oamaru	Liberal
1893–1896	12th	Oamaru	Liberal
1896–1899	13th	Oamaru	Liberal
1899–1902	14th	Oamaru	Liberal
1902–1905	15th	Oamaru	Liberal
1905–1908	16th	Oamaru	Liberal
1908–1911	17th	Oamaru	Liberal

He represented the Waitaki electorate from 1881 to 1890 and then the Oamaru electorate from 1890 to 1911, when he was defeated by Ernest Lee. He was particularly concerned with land policy, stating that he left the 'old world' that was full of landlords to a place where land ownership could be freer. With his rural background he often clashed with urban MPs, even from his own party, once famously retorting to an interjection by Auckland MP William Joseph Napier "I should like to see the honourable gentleman on the land; he would not make a living on it."

Duncan was a personal friend of lands minister John McKenzie, who, upon his retirement from cabinet, recommended to Prime Minister Richard Seddon that Duncan succeed him in cabinet. At the same time the Liberal caucus successfully pressured Seddon to enlarge the cabinet by two ministers in June 1900. Duncan, as McKenzie had desired was elevated to cabinet with McKenzie stating he was a good country farmer and faithful party man. Many others in the caucus had reservations about Duncan's competency, with the more ambitious amongst them feeling aggrieved they had been overlooked in favour of, in their eyes, a nonentity. Many criticisms were made during debates in the house about the lands department, but Seddon refused to drop Duncan from the cabinet. Seddon had never sacked a minister, and despite promising the caucus he would reconstruct his cabinet after the 1905 election, he was reluctant to dismiss a loyal supporter such as Duncan. In 1905 he voted against a bill making voting in elections compulsory.

When Seddon died in 1906, the new Prime Minister Sir Joseph Ward, decided to drop Duncan from the cabinet. Duncan was ambivalent about his demotion, but became a critic in the house of land policy being pursued by Ward and the new lands minister Robert McNab. By 1907 he had become a bitter critic of Ward and McNab, he became a leading member of the 'country party' (a grouping inside the Liberal caucus opposing single-tax and land taxation policies). He opposed Ward's 1907 land bill which was to end lease-in-perpetuity, which he saw as a rejection of the land reforms undertaken by McKenzie. He called it change for the sake of change and even went as far as to suggest to the opposition that they combine with dissenting Liberals to make heavy amendments in the select committee.

He was appointed to the New Zealand Legislative Council on 13 June 1912 and served until his death in 1914.

== Citations ==
New Zealand Parliament
Preceded by Samuel Shrimski; George Jones	Member of Parliament for Waitaki; 1881–1890	Succeeded by John McKenzie
Preceded by Thomas William Hislop	Member of Parliament for Oamaru; 1890–1911	Succeeded by Ernest Lee
