= Reformed fundamentalism =

Fundamentalism in the Reformed tradition

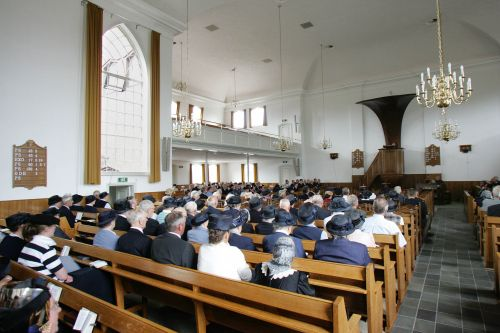
Christian head covering in the Restored Reformed Church of Doornspijk (Netherlands), consistent with historic Reformed practice (2012).

Reformed fundamentalism (also known as fundamentalist Calvinism) arose in some conservative Presbyterian, Congregationalist, Reformed Anglican, Reformed Baptist, Non-denominational and other Reformed churches, which agree to some extent with the motives and aims of broader evangelical Protestant fundamentalism. The movement was historically defined by a repudiation of liberal and modernist theology, the publication (1905–1915) entitled, The Fundamentals, and had the intent to progress and revitalise evangelical Protestantism in predominantly English-speaking Protestant countries, as well as to reform separated churches according to the Bible, historic expression of faith and the principles of the Reformation. The Fundamentalist–Modernist controversy, and the Downgrade controversy, kindled the growth and development of reformed fundamentalism in the United States and the United Kingdom. Reformed fundamentalists have laid greater emphasis on historic confessions of faith, such as the Westminster Confession of Faith.

== History and main leaders ==
Carl McIntire formed the Bible Presbyterian Church in 1937. For McIntire the term Fundamentalist included attachment to the fundamentals of the historic Christian religion as defined by the Westminster Confession of Faith, the doctrinal standard of the Presbyterian Church and by the Apostles Creed and Nicene Creed. He was a Calvinist who believed that John Calvin's Institutes of the Christian Religion, the Westminster Confession, and the Shorter and Larger Westminster catechisms were the finest articulations of the Christian faith.

== Theological distinctives ==
=== Broader conservative evangelicalism ===
==== Pertaining to salvation and the gospel ====
- Christocentric (a special emphasis upon Christ in preaching, interpretation and practice), and 'crucicentric' (a special emphasis on the atoning work of Christ on the cross)
- The perspicuity or clarity of scripture for salvation (2 Tim. 3. 15)
- The distinction of mankind from the rest of the created order, as mankind is created in "the image [tselem] and likeness [demuth] of God" (Gen. 1. 27)
- The Original Sin and Fall of mankind (Gen. 3), and the subsequent pervasive sinfulness and total depravity of all humans. The imago Dei is regarded as present but tainted.
- Two eternal conditions and abodes: the eternal life that is realised in the present by faith in Jesus Christ and that ends with the believer in the presence of the Lord (Heaven) after bodily death, and spiritual death that is realised in the present through slavery to sin and spiritual blindness that results in the unregenerate in eternal perdition (Hell) after bodily death. Christians believe that only God's grace in Christ can rescue condemned sinners from eternal destruction. Jesus distinguished between the "broad way that leads to destruction," and the "narrow way that leads to life" (Matt 7:13-14).
- Christian exclusivism, or particularism. Salvation in Christ alone. Jesus is taught as having sole access to God the Father (John 14. 6) and as being the 'first' and highest priority for the Christian and the world (pre-eminence of Christ).
- Emphasis is placed upon the prophetic fulfilment of the scriptures in Christ.
- Regeneration by the Holy Spirit and the personal indwelling of the Holy Spirit. Regeneration is considered to precede faith.
- Salvation received through the appropriation of the saving work of Christ, not by any human deeds or efforts (Tit. 3. 5). Jesus' perfect obedience to the Law (active obedience), atoning death in place of guilty law-breaking sinners (substitutionary atonement), and the satisfaction of the demands of God's justice at the cross (penal substitution) are positively affirmed and defended.
- Justification by faith alone in Christ alone and Jesus Christ as the object of saving faith.
- Faith as a gift from God (Eph. 2. 8).
- Emphasis upon evangelism.

==== Other fundamental Protestant and biblical theology ====
- 39 books of the Old Testament and the 27 books of the New Testament and Scripture as the supreme and final authority in faith, practice and life.
- Trinitarianism (Triune God).
- Church invisible and Church visible.
- Reformational solae – scripture alone (sola scriptura), grace alone (sola gratia), faith alone (sola fide), Christ alone (solus Christus), glory to God alone (soli Deo Gloria). Tota scriptura (the whole scripture) and prima scriptura (scripture first) are related to sola scriptura.
- Gymnobiblism and accommodation – the bare, accommodated text of a vernacular Bible without commentary, may be safely given to the unlearned as a sufficient guide to religious truth.
- The believer's necessary dependence on the Holy Spirit, and the evidence of the works of the Holy Spirit on the believer (e.g. conviction of sin, confidence of forgiveness in Christ, assurance of adoption, renewed hope of heaven, etc.).
- The action of Christian faith through means of grace to spiritually soften and cleanse the believer, and the Puritan notion of "heart work."
- Compatabilism.
- The goodness and grace of God, particularly the saving grace and forgiveness that comes through the redemption that is found in Christ.
- The severity of sin and the righteousness of the law of God.
- The practice of believers to contend against 'spiritual darkness' and unrighteousness.
- The ordination of human government for maintaining justice and law.
- The judgement of Christ and the Last Judgement.
- The resurrection of the dead.
- The rapture (gathering) of God's elect. Pre-tribulationism is common in dispensationalism.
- The millennial reign of Jesus Christ, and chiefly historic premillennialism. This is in contrast with dispensationalist premillennialism.
- Non-conformism and (ecclesiastical) separatism. The principle and practice of separation (2 Tim. 3).
- The priesthood of all believers.
- The existence of the 'good works' of believers.
- The absence of contradiction between true scriptural interpretation and (authentic) science.
- The "chief end of man" to glorify God, and enjoy him forever (Westminster Shorter Catechism Q1).
- Original creation made from nothing (creatio ex nihilo).
- Unlike more mainstream fundamentalism, some reformed Christians have accepted forms of Historical, Young Biosphere (YBC) and Gap creationism.
- Mosaic authorship of the Pentateuch. Conservative scholars have posited some assistance in Mosaic composition and antiquity of any source documents.
- Traditional authorship is ascribed to books entitled after a name, such as Amos, Isaiah, Matthew, John etc.
- Heterosexual and monogamous marriage as God-ordained, and the belief in only specific biblical grounds for divorce.

=== The inspiration and preservation of the Scriptures ===
==== Verbal plenary inspiration ====
Reformed fundamentalists believe in the inspiration (theopneustia) and conservation of the entire scripture. The forerunning debates in the nineteenth and early twentieth centuries resulted in the defence of the doctrine of the superintended plenary (full) organic inspiration of the scriptures, a doctrine confused and derided as 'mechanical' inspiration at the time. François Gaussen's defence of plenary inspiration has been one influential Protestant testimony. For conservative fundamentalist evangelicals, inspiration never ceased with the inaccessibility of the originals.

Since the scriptures are the work of God, "[s]peculation into the "how" of inspiration is a prying into what is not revealed [...] We are not told how God inspired the writers of the scriptures. It is probable that none could know save those who were so energized" and the particular process of inspiration and the doctrine of scripture is likened to the incomprehensible (to reason) doctrines of the Trinity and incarnation. The overarching salvific end of the scriptures (2 Tim. 3.15) is often emphasised, and that hermeneutical limitations do not subtract from the salvific end and Divine activity of the scriptures. Psalm 119.89 is shown to defend the eternal settling of the Bible. The verity of inspiration and purity of the words are predicated as resting upon the scripture itself, whether all the writers knew they were writing scripture or not. The canon is considered the collection of inspired books that God alone intended to be the rule of faith, and laid on the consciences of Christians; other apostolic works, such as Paul's Epistle to the Laodiceans (Col. 4. 16), were therefore unintended to become a 'rule of faith' for the entire Christian community.

Verbal inspiration, upheld by various Protestant churches, maintains that the individual backgrounds, personal traits, and literary styles of the writers and compilers were authentically theirs, but had been providentially prepared by God for use as His instrument in producing scripture. It is held that the normal exercise of endowed human abilities was unhindered and that the process of inspiration was superintended so mysteriously, that every word written was the exact word God wanted to be written. Original words of scripture are considered to be of an 'holistic inspiration' (i.e. unable to be dissected into substance and form). Copies and printed editions when free from scribal erratum, are handled as God-breathed and are the foundation of translation. Therefore, the scripture is considered unfailing and blunder-exempt from within (ab intra). The biblical writer/prophet's scriptural familiarity is considered providentially prepared. Additionally, the languages in which the writing was completed, are considered as being perfectly adapted to the expression of God's 'divine thoughts.'

The translations of the Greek New Testament and Hebrew Old Testament are considered the inspired word of God to the extent that they are a close, accurate rendering of the scriptures. Wherever the English version of the testaments lies fairly within the confines of the original, the authority of the latest form is as great as that of the earliest. In other words, inspiration is not considered as 'limited to that portion which lay within the horizon of the original scribes'. The Bible's inspiration is made immediately apparent by the Holy Spirit to the believer only, who has been gifted the Spirit at salvation.

==== Preservation of the texts of scripture ====
Verbal preservation is defined by the retention of every canonical word in the original languages that God intended for future generations. It is held that not a single word, letter, accent, or character, in the originals has been lost to the Church. The preservation of scripture is considered complete, kept through the providentially-guided and continuous "normal" (regular) copying of scribes, and "singular" (special) transmission, compilation and printing.

The preservation of God's written word is contended as a faith position that Christ himself held (Matt. 5.18) and as detectable/locatable. Other scriptures that have been cited as documentary confirmation of God's preservation of the written Word are Matt. 5.18, Matt. 24.35, John 10.35, and 1 Pet. 1.25. Chapter 1.8 of the Westminster Confession of Faith speaks of the scriptures as being "by His singular care and providence, kept pure in all ages, [and] are therefore authentical."

Faithful textual study is considered to confirm true textual recognition, and that diligent and devotional study renders the Christian's access to God's Word identical to what God's Word is ontologically. It is held, that as God providentially entrusted the transmittance of His Word through human scribes, God has also allowed His elect obvious referential textual access. John Owen and Francis Turretin (Reformed theologians) are championed as defenders of the traditional text preservation view of the Bible, the former writing; "[w]e add that the whole scripture entire, as given out from God, without any loss, is preserved in the Copies of the Originals yet remaining; What varieties there are among the Copies themselves shall be afterwards declared; in them all, we say, is every letter and Tittle of the Word" Yet, Arminian theologians have defended the traditional readings too. The contextual case of Frederic Godet is one example.

Earlier and twentieth century conservative Protestants favoured Ben Chayyim's Masoretic texts, affirming the consonantal text with vowel points, and the Byzantine Majority Text: singularly, the Received Text. Particular and ordinary providence have been cited in support of the traditional texts of the Old and New Testaments. Providential preservation extending to the ecclesiastical copyists and scribes of the continuous centuries since the first century AD, to the Jewish scribe-scholars (including the Levites and later, the Qumranites and Masoretes), and to the orthodox and catholic scholars of the Renaissance and Reformation. This has been called a "high view" of preservation. The degree of ascription of textual purity to the (traditional) Vulgate and Eastern Orthodox liturgical tradition, is often a determining factor in the acceptance of some Byzantine-attested Received readings and early modern (English) Bible verses. William Fulke's parallel Bible (1611 KJV–Douay Rheims) showed great similarities and minor differences, and Benno A. Zuiddam's work on the Nova Vulgata shows the vast verbatim agreement between the TR and the (Clementine) Vulgate. Robert Adam Boyd Received Text edition (The Greek Textus Receptus New Testament with manuscript annotations) shows the most common TR readings for the major TR editions. These variant TR readings are used by some scholars to evaluate the Authorised Version.

The published notes of the King James translators, shown in Norton's New Cambridge Bible margin, indicate where they chose one TR reading over another. Rev. Jeffrey Riddle has identified three groups within contemporary traditional text advocacy, and distinguished between his traditional text advocacy and certain negative forms of "KJV-Onlyism" (e.g. "The Inspired KJV Group" and "The KJV As New Revelation"). Some defend the Complutensian New Testament, a likely influence on Erasmus and Stephanus et al, and the Greek Vatican manuscripts possessed by those editors; referencing John Mill's testimony that the Complutensian editors followed "one most ancient and correct [Vatican MSS] copy," Richard Smalbroke and other Puritans defended Byzantine 'minority readings' in the TR, including 1 John 5.7-8. Due to the debate over the 'weighting' of Byzantine manuscripts, and questions over the 'counting' method and total number of Byzantine manuscripts surveyed by MT advocates, the few 'minority [Byzantine] readings' in the Received Text have been accepted over Majority Text readings. The identity of the Greek manuscripts used in the Complutensian New Testament are not known, nor all of the manuscripts of Erasmus and Stephanus.

The perceived ambiguities of the standard form of the Masoretic Text are subjected to de minimis, along with the orthographic variations with Qumran texts. The Torah might have been rendered or regressed into an already-extant, common and primitive Hebrew tongue (Ketav Ivri-Paleo-Hebrew), where the Ktav Ashuri (square Hebrew) restrictively originated early rather than late with Ezra, yet the specific transmission history of Ketav Ivri is at present undetermined. The signs of the supposed antiquity of the Book of Job, the likely date of Job's patriarchal existence and the Hebrew form of the received book, strongly suggests to conservatives that Ktav Ashuri is ancient (i.e. significantly pre-exilic). The ultimate dominance and authority of the Masoretic Text is underscored by Christians and Jews despite Imperial Aramaic having a similar script: the implication of causation or independence has been debated since Rev. John Lightfoot. The consonantal-only text tradition, for example as shown by the Dead Sea Scrolls, has been debated since the Reformation; the existence of the consonantal text only could not disprove a restricted system of vowels (niqqud) predating the Masoretes, and the preservation and linguistic difficulties of a consonantal text with an oral tradition of vowels, led some to insist that the 'pure originals' contained or accompanied a vowel system (e.g. the Dean Burgon Society still advocates the originality of the received vowel points, in line with the reformed orthodox theologians). The Trinitarian Bible Society believes the Masoretes providentially introduced the standard system of vowels, imaginably upon precise vowel-vocalising tradition, veritable Jewish recitation practices (e.g. synagogues and homes), and lost and extant written records, including rabbinic commentaries (e.g. Mishnah-Tosefta, Houses of Hillel and Shammai traditions, Ezra's school of scribes etc.).

The Great Assembly (Neh. 9-10) is considered a landmark event in the timeline and transmission of the Old Testament canon. Any lack of explanation for the variations arising in the Septuagint (LXX) is not seen as evidence for an archaeologically-unattested Hebrew vorlage, in the same way variations in the Gospel accounts are not considered absolute proof of the hypothetical Q-source document or 'blind reproduction' by the synoptic writers.

=== Common principles of Reformation evangelical interpretation and private reading ===
- Christocentric rule and redemptive-historical hermeneutic
- Typological hermeneutic
- Hermeneutic of covenant/promise and grace
- The literal-historical-grammatical method of interpretation, instead of tropological, allegorical, and anagogical interpretation. Criticisms of Reformational Protestant interpretation often confound literalism for letterism (also, hyperliteralism/crude literalism).
- Consultation of lexicons, grammars, concordances (Cruden's concordance), and the Hebrew and Greek testaments
- Contextual grounding and reading in 'concentric circles' (verse-paragraph-chapter-book-genre-testament/covenant)
- The analogy of faith (scriptura sui ipsius interpres, 'scripture interprets/informs scripture')
- The principle of non-contradiction. (1) That God cannot contradict the scripture, (2) that scripture when rightly interpreted does not violate scripture.
- Sensitivity to literary genre (e.g. prophetic, poetic, epistle, apocalyptic, Gospel etc.)
- Sensitivity to the penman's theological emphases and how one author/book fits within a prophetic tradition (e.g. Isaiah-Jeremiah)
- Law/principle of first mention
- Dr. David L. Cooper's "Golden Rule" of interpretation.
- The Reformational "wax nose" and scriptural interpretation as "finitely plastic."

=== The classical creeds and reformational confessions ===
- Creedal: Nicene Creed, Apostles' Creed, Athanasian Creed (and Chalcedonian Definition). The first four ecumenical councils of the early Church are therefore acknowledged.
- Confessional: Westminster Confession of Faith (1646)

Whilst received and used, the creeds and confessions are not considered as bearing equal authority to the Bible. The most notable Early Church Fathers have been recognised.

== Congregational practices ==
- Presbyterian or congregational polities
- Expository preaching. Some Presbyterian and traditional reformed ministers continue to wear the Geneva gown.
- Prayer (private and communal)
- Congregational singing
- Eldership/governance and complementarian understanding and practice (e.g. may include male pulpit preaching and eldership, female-led children's ministry, gender-segregated groups and activities, women's head coverings, etc.).
- The two sacraments/ordinances of baptism and communion. Free Presbyterian and Presbyterian churches practice believer's baptism (credobaptism) and infant baptism (paedobaptism) but Baptist and Independent Evangelical churches allow only believer's baptism.

== Bible translation and usage ==
Some discussion surrounding the dominant usage of an English translation exists, but primarily concerns the New Testament. However, despite the commonalities of the "ben Hayyim-Bombergiana" and modern Biblia Hebraica editions, some slight differences are observed in the body text. These differences are due to a modern preference, since Kittel and Kahle, for the Leningrad Codex (and Aleppo Codex) rather than the text of Jacob ben Chayyim, and the use of the Septuagint (ancient Greek translation of the Old Testament), Dead Sea Scrolls and other ancient translations of the Old Testament (e.g. Samaritan Pentateuch, Targum, Vulgate, Peshitta). Conjectural emendations of the Masoretic text in modern versions (e.g. NRSV, NIV; Prov. 26.23) are not admitted due to complete absence of manuscript support. Likewise, employment of ancient Old Testament versions beyond commentary, is not affirmed. The validity of the critical method of conjectural emendation is challenged. The Bomberg-Chayyim edition has been one of the most used and printed Masoretic texts in the world, along with the formatted and styled reproduced edition of Max Letteris.

In 1972, a reprint of Bomberg's 1525 Venice edition (with an introduction by Moshe Goshen-Gottstein) was published in Jerusalem by Makor Publishing, and the Trinitarian Bible Society print the Ginsburg edition, the ben Hayyim-Bombergiana furnished with a comprehensive Masorah (notes on the Masoretic Text by the Masoretes). Ginsburg did not alter the text of ben Chayyim's 2nd edition but agreed that 1 Joshua 21.36-37 were likely authentic, omitted due to a scribal error. These verses were in the First Rabbinic Bible, and now also in recent editions of the Hebrew Bible. Chayyim's 2nd (Great) Rabbinic Bible lost primacy as a standard among mainstream critical scholars in the twentieth century, but has endured in fundamentalist denominations and independent evangelical churches with teaching institutions and academic facilities.

The discussion over vernacular translation also concerns the method of translation. Formal equivalence has long been considered superior to dynamic (functional) equivalence and optimal equivalence.

=== The Authorised Version Tradition, the Byzantine Received Text, and Eastern (Greek) and Western (Greco-Latin) Ecclesiastical Translation Traditions ===
Traditional conservative evangelicals exalted the King James Version, and held that the Textus Receptus (TR) was the honoured and restorative Greek text to Latin Church. The TR is now generally applied to the family of similar Byzantine-text Greek New Testaments, for example, the editions of Erasmus (first edition, Novum Instrumentum omne, 1516), Beza (first edition, Octavo, 1565) and Stephanus (notable third edition, Editio Regia, 1550). The editions published by Abraham and Bonaventure Elzivir, almost identical to the texts of Beza, became known as the Textus Receptus ('Received Text') due to a note in Heinsius' preface ("Therefore, you have the text now received by all [...]"), but Textus Receptus has also been commonly applied to the 1550 Stephanus edition. The 47 translators of the 1611 KJV (AKJV) used the New Testaments of Erasmus, Stephanus and Beza, yet augmented with the Tyndale, Geneva (Whittingham), Complutensian Polyglot, Coverdale, Bishops' and Matthew Bibles.

Where KJV verses differed from modern versions, the Vulgate had been claimed as an influence; apologists for the KJV and Received Text translations, for example Dr. Ken Matto, list the Greek manuscript authorities that correspond to Received and Vulgate readings (e.g. Tit. 2.7; D 06, K 018, L 020), but not without criticism from eclectic textual scholars. KJV defenders reply by highlighting the influence of the Targum and Septuagint on modern Old Testament textual critics. Ben Chayyim's text was the Old Testament base text but it was supplemented with the first Rabbinic Bible (e.g. Josh. 21. 36-37). F. H. A. Scrivener prepared a close Greek text edition that likely lay behind the AKJV, using the editions of the TR that were extant at the time of the translators. Edward F. Hills believed Scrivener's text to be an "independent variety of the Textus Receptus" and where TR editions differed, Scrivener's text was to be taken as the authoritative and providential reading. The Authorised Version was edited in 1612, 1613, 1616, 1617, 1629, 1630, 1634, 1638, 1640, before the editions of 1762 (S. F. Paris, Cambridge Edition), 1769 (Benjamin Blayney, Oxford Edition) and 1873 (Scrivener, Cambridge Paragraph Bible).

Despite historical linguistic editorial changes, the 1611 text remained materially constant. Defenders of the Authorised Version call to attention that the early modern English grammar reflected the use of singular (e.g. 'thou,' 'thee,' 'thy' and 'thine') and plural (e.g. 'ye,' 'you,' 'your' and 'yours') second person pronouns in the Hebrew and Greek languages, Hebrew possessing separate masculine and feminine forms. 1611 translator additions for the purpose of better rendering sentences were in smaller roman type, but in Blayney's Oxford edition, italics were used instead. Several italic decisions of the Oxford edition have since been changed (e.g. 1 John 2.23).

The New Cambridge Paragraph Bible (2005) and the Third Millennium Bible (1998) are two minor modern and conservative editions of the KJV. Blayney's 1769 Oxford edition remains the most widely circulated KJV.

=== Modern versions, denominational preferences and translation controversies ===
The Thomas Nelson publication of the New King James Version (1982) was a minor development within the movement. The Revised Authorised Version is the British edition, published by Samuel Bagster & Co. The preface to the NKJV states that the New Testament is based upon the same New Testament selection behind the KJV. The translators remove older English words and the second person pronoun distinctions, detach from some of the "damnation language," include a great number of exclamation marks (e.g. see the Psalms) and headings, and enlarge the number of pronoun capitalisations of Divine persons. The Old Testament does depart from several textual choices of the KJV (e.g. 1 Sam 13.1, 1 Chron. 7.28), the translators preferring the Biblia Hebraica and Ketiv/Qere in places. The NKJV includes in the footnotes where the translated Greek text differs from the critical text (minority text) and recent majority text: the accommodation to include references to critical editions of the New Testament continues to divide opinion and source discussion, as do references to Ben Asher's text and ancient versions.

NKJV Reader's editions exclude all textual footnotes. A small number of New Testament readings questionably approach eclectic readings and lately the KJV 2016, Simplified KJV, and MEV have been viewed as qualified and modernised alternatives. In congregational teaching and preaching, ministers have used Received Text translations with an informed awareness of modern translation and versions, and have utilised the KJV, its language, and the works of Protestants steeped in the KJV, in personal study, private devotion and prayers: for example, Dr. Martyn Lloyd-Jones publicly read from the Authorised Version, but made direct reference to alternative revised translations and contemporary terms. Spurgeon and Lloyd-Jones represent reformed circles that believe the KJV is the English standard, one that is capable of English improvement in select cases, but close to the original languages. Mental paraphrasing of the KJV is practised when reciting and for silent reading.

Some fundamentalists do use translations based upon the earliest dated extant manuscripts, such as the NRSV, ESV and NASB, the NASB being stylistically similar to the NKJV. The proliferation of the New International Version (NIV) has been observed with censure, but the ability for various translations to lead an individual to saving faith in Christ is freely admitted. Many affirm the stylistic standard of prior versions. The Free Presbyterian Church of Ulster uses the Authorised Version, '[b]elieving it to be the most reliable translation,' the Bible Spreading Union promote the Authorised Version, the Calvary Chapel Association prefer the NKJV and KJV, and the (British) Affirmation 2010 states, "[t]he authentic and preserved Texts are the Hebrew Masoretic and Greek Received Texts, and these are the Texts which underlie the Authorized Version, which is by far the best and most accurate English translation of God’s infallible and inerrant Word currently in use". The Trinitarian Bible Society promote Scrivener's Received Text for the purposes of translation and mission. Translations with a lower reading level are in some churches chosen for the pews. Thomas Nelson publish and promote the Byzantine-based translations (KJV, NKJV) as well as Alexandrian-based translations (ASV, RSV).

Evangelicals recognise the strong commitment to scriptural inspiration and sound orthodox doctrine of earlier translators, and the need for the Christian to be a regular reader of the Bible. Unnecessary division over translation (e.g. Ruckmanism, intertextualism) has been internally condemned. It is emphasised that the written word is a means by which Christians know the incarnate Word (Christ Jesus) more intimately.

== Evangelical and missional apologetics ==
A combination of evidences, Bible apologetics, and pre-suppositional arguments for Christian faith, within the framework of a conservative theology, have been advanced.

- The individual's perception of the creation leaves them without an excuse regarding the Creator's existence (Rom. 1.20). Pauline argumentation, as found in the Acts and the Epistles (particularly Romans), is exalted; Paul's sermon on the Areopagus in Acts 17 is the combination of natural theology and gospel preaching.
- The Law, 'written on the hearts,' gives humans an active conscience and makes them aware of God's moral standards
- The moral transformation of 'born again' individuals, and the quickening of social conscience (e.g. Factory Acts, abolitionist movement etc.)
- The remarkable preservation and survival of the Jewish people since the birth of the Christian Church
- The formation of many charities and associations for the poor and unrepresented as a result of gospel missionary zeal. The Wesleyan revival is considered the exemplar demonstration of evangelical protestant social action.
- The dignity of Christian marriage (life-long monogamy) and the demographic stability and child security
- The unparalleled reforming impact of the Bible on individuals, law-making, literature and liberty
- The fine-tuning of the universe for life in relation to the Earth, and the stability and regularity of cosmic constants. The observance of cosmic laws correlated with God as the law-giver in the Mosaic Pentateuch.
- A common Christian faith generates social cohesion and trust, and local churches provide a venue for community, gathering and relationships
- The liberties borne out of Christian culture and Christendom: self-determination, Habeas corpus, trial by jury, right to a fair trial, freedom and toleration of religion and worship, freedom of association, freedom of the press, freedom of expression/speech, freedom of thought/conscience, property rights, employment rights, etc.

=== Bible apologetics ===
- Reformed theologians, beginning with John Calvin, have described the scriptures are "self-authenticating" (autopiston)
- Fulfilled Old Testament prophecies, including Messianic prophecies fulfilled in Jesus (Psalm 22, Isaiah 53, Micah 5.2 etc.), and fulfilment of prophecies given by Jesus in the Olivet Discourse (siege and destruction of Jerusalem in 70 AD, emergence of false messiah-claimants, continuance of war, increase in famines and pestilences, persecution of believers, etc.)
- Archaeological finds compatible with scriptural accounts (e.g. Pilate stone, Vardar Gate "Politarch" inscription, Tel Dan stele, Merneptah Stele, Ketef Hinnom scrolls, Lachish letters, Siloam tunnel, Kurkh Monoliths, Nimrud Tablet K.3751, Azekah Inscription, Sennacherib's Annals, Cylinders of Nabonidus, Nabonidus Chronicle, Mesha Stele, Elephantine papyri, Arch of Titus, Nazareth Inscription, Hittite cuneiform etc.)
- The moral and intellectual insufficiency of humans and the reluctance of critics to affirm authentic external verification and internal textual evidence
- The Gospels as unique Christian historiography but harmonious with ancient historical trends and customs (Jewish and Gentile). The shared characteristics of the Gospels has led to the view they were written after the pattern of the Old Testament ancient Hebrew (prophetic) oracles rather than simple Greco-Roman biography.
- The unity and internal consistency of the Bible
- The Bible as preserving, maturing, growing and edifying the gift of faith

== Liberal-modernist challenge to verbal inspiration and truthfulness of scripture ==
The rise and challenge of theological liberalism in the nineteenth century led to the modern inerrancy movement. B. B. Warfield of Princeton Theological Seminary was a key figure in the development of the movement. The early fundamentalists, believing in the infallibility of the Bible, contributed to the defence of the Bible and welcomed the findings and published works of Christians who presupposed the Bible to be fully true. The "Conservative Resurgence" in the Southern Baptist Convention and the founding of conservative seminaries (e.g. Westminster Theological Seminary, Whitefield Theological Seminary, Dallas Theological Seminary, Reformed Theological Seminary, etc.) propagated the fundamentalist response to challenges to biblical authority. It is common for those affiliated with conservative churches and denominations to use resolutions/harmonisations apologetically. Defenders of inerrancy argue the acceptance of biblical errancy opens the route to the general denial of revelation, subjective claims dogmatically advanced, revision of the nature of history, unwarranted over-reliance on scholarship, and presumption against (ancient) attested sources.

Conservatives have contended that the number of discrepancies is exaggerated by critics, and the apparent nature of many of them is determinable. However, evangelicals have freely acknowledged that the Bible cannot be wholly proven, and that not all particulars, nor methodologies, are readily available to reconcile the few 'difficulties;' difficulties has been favoured as a term to describe passages in dispute. Christ's statements in the Gospels regarding Old Testament events have been seen as superior to modern critical judgements. Conservatives contend that texts must be allowed to stand as they reflect the diverse inspired multi-purposes of the penmen, lying characters, progressive toponymy, rhetoric contradiction (Prov. 26.4-5) and as they test faith and incentivise close reading of the Bible.

Examples of replies to accusations of erroneous statements and teaching:

- The genealogies of Christ in the Gospels. Matthew 1 and Luke 3; Luke is recording Mary’s genealogy and Matthew is recording Joseph’s.
- The numbers involved in the Exodus; Colin J. Humphreys argues that the Hebrew word commonly translated as thousand had an earlier primitive meaning of clan.

Examples of responses to accusations of inconsistencies and contradiction:

- Faith and Works. Ephesians 2.8-9 and James 2.24; the 'faith' that James speaks of is not a 'saving faith'.
- Angelic appearances in the Resurrection accounts. Matthew 28.2-7, Mark 16.5-7, Luke 24.4-7, John 20.12: Matthew and Mark do not explicitly deny the existence of a second angel.

== Modern biblical criticism ==
John 7:53–8:11 (Pericope Adulterae) and Mark 16:9–20 (the last twelve verses of Mark) have been defended as authentic. 1 John 5:7–8 (Comma Johanneum) is excluded from the critical texts and most modern translations, but has become a focal point of discussion on the primitive Latin-Vulgate textual sources (e.g. Vetus Latina) and the moral integrity of the classical trinitarians. Calvin cites the comma in Book III of The Institutes. Assumptions on the transmission of the New Testament text determine acceptance of the Johannine Comma. Modern mainstream textual criticism has caused discord since the theories and methodology of eclecticism have long been seen as defective to traditional text adherents, for example the principle that scribal copyists tend to interpolate rather than omit, and the alleged recensionist Greek New Testament text and critical readings of Lucian of Antioch, the latter rejected by Jerome. Arian and heterodox corruptions of the New Testament and inattentions of transcribers in the Eastern Mediterranean region, have been associated with the later-rejected minority-eclectic readings. Eclectic scholars are charged with ignoring and rejecting the Byzantine faction's 'tests' of textual authenticity. Traditional text adherents do not believe the New Testament requires the eclectic "scientific" approach, calling to attention the gaps in early textual transmission history and the conclusions of scholars who openly reject the evangelical view of the Bible.

Reformed fundamentalist pastors and theologians have seen biblical criticism and radical higher criticism as proceeding from unbelief in the Divine activity behind scripture, and considered it one of the chief culprits behind the decline of conservative scholarship in Western theological colleges and churches, and Bible preaching. Ian Paisley strongly associated it with infidelity and the decline of Christendom. Conservatives see rationalistic methods combined with linguistic criticism as fatally flawed, and affirm the Bible was faithfully transmitted without the alleged gross interpolations of the critics, containing no inauthentic works.

The publications of conservative biblical scholars such as William Henry Green, Frédéric Louis Godet, William Ramsay, Carl Friedrich Keil, Franz Delitzsch, Robert D. Wilson, William Kelly and Gerhard Maier, Martyn Lloyd-Jones, Robert L. Thomas, F. David Farnell, Edward D. Andrews, William J. Abraham, J. I. Packer, G. K. Beale, Jon D. Levenson and Scott W. Hahn have been cited by conservatives.

== Modern Western society and intellectual unbelief ==
Rienk Kuiper, E. J. Poole-Connor and Ian Paisley, believed that the Protestant evangelical Church was entering into apostasy, apostasy that could culminate in the coming of the "man of sin" (2 Thess. 2). The increase in the departure from "Bible Protestantism" and Christian teachings, has led Christians to anticipate the coming again of Christ.

The return of Jews to the Land of Israel has further generated an expectation of the close of the age.

Reformed fundamentalists oppose the classical heresies, salvific teachings of the Church of Rome, and liberal and modernist theology. Opposition has been to Universalism, forms of ecumenism, modern Pelagianism, inclusivism, Unitarianism, pantheism, Social Gospel, speciation and anthropological evolutionism, high antiquity of mankind, anti-special creation, Enlightenment rationalism, historical-critical hermeneutic, Old Testament panbabylonianism, Jesus mythicism, psilanthropism or denial of the virgin birth, archaeological biblical minimalism (Copenhagen School), humanistic egalitarianism, myth of progress, neo-orthodoxy, New Perspectives on Paul, Emerging Church, Progressive Christianity, Christian left (socialism), evangelical feminism, and neo-evangelicalism/moderate Christianity.

Culturally, reformed fundamentalists have often aligned themselves against scientism, and are opposed to and sceptical of the methods of anti-theist researchers. Paul Copan has argued that the position of the scientific naturalist is self-refuting because scientism itself cannot be verified according to the scientific method.

Neo-orthodoxy's anti-confessional denial that the Bible is ontologically the Word of God, is considered to produce the same consequences as liberalism. Dutch theologian Cornelius Van Til wrote extensively on the theology of Karl Barth (i.e. Barthianism), particularly Barth's doctrine of scripture.

Romanism, Marxism and Communism, and organised social propagation of moral liberalism have been assailed.

=== Criticism of New-Neo Evangelicalism and the 'Present Downgrade' ===
Throughout the twentieth century, opposition was made to both New and Neo Evangelicalism. Evangelical futurists have associated New-Neo Evangelicalism with the Great Apostasy, introduced in the Second Epistle to the Thessalonians. Some charge neo-evangelicals with a lack of belief and trust in the power and message of the Bible in its vernacular form and original texts.

New Evangelical departures from Reformational principles and doctrine, precipitated ministerial separation. Conservative evangelicals have opposed female ordination, homosexual practice and gay marriage, transgenderism (gender deconstructionism), and trends in moderate evangelicalism (decision salvation, experientialism, theologically-light worship etc.). Wayne A. Grudem has controversially predicted that (new) evangelical feminism is a path to theological liberalism, and the downgrade of the Biblical testimony and decline of denominational evangelicalism. Female pastors and ministers are considered a violation of Paul's instructions in 1 Tim. 2, and contrary to gender representation in the Old and New Testaments (rooted in the Adam and Eve account).

Conservative evangelicals have had reservations about some aspects of the Charismatic movement, including the genuineness of certain experiences, but Charismatic emphasis upon renewal, the Spirit, Christian freedom, and healing and spiritual gifts has been welcomed. Some challenge the restoration of apostolic tongues and authenticity of many 'prophetic' behaviours and words. Dr. Lloyd-Jones did not affirm cessationism.

New calls for separation since the end of COVID-19 lockdowns from churches and denominations that are opposed to Reformational Protestant hermeneutics (e.g. historical-literal-grammatical) and biblical authority have been made to preserve the western remnant of conservative biblical Christianity. The process of separation from new 'Progressive-Critical-Radical' theology has begun in several reformed and conservative denominations. Rev. Eric Mason and Owen Strachan have criticised "Woke Church" and "Wokeness" in Christian churches, and John MacArthur and Voddie Baucham have criticised the "Social Justice Movement."

=== Materialist and naturalist unbelief, and historic Adamism and creationism ===
Absolute naturalistic theories and methods have been markedly opposed since Charles Darwin's publication, On the Origin of Species, in 1859.

Christian scholars such as A. J. Monty White, Edwin M. Yamauchi and Reijer Hooykaas have been critical of inconsistent, exclusive uniformitarian views. Catastrophism is considered the reliable pre-supposition. A. J. Monty White and others, criticise the exploitation of dating methods (e.g. radiometric techniques) that project 'soulish' man's origin beyond a genealogical estimate for Adam's formation, and the early biblical civilisation. Recognising that Genesis 1 to 3 'moves on a plane that transcends [...] mundane evaluation,' Emil Kraeling contended that a reasonable locus of any archaeological debate over the correlation between the well-attested, settled history of mankind and the story of Genesis ought to be 'from the moment [...] Adam is commanded to till the earth' and the settled, cultivated living of Cain and Abel. The use of DNA sequencing to conjecture 'molecular clocks' and phylogenetic trees, has been critically challenged, and the incredulity of belief in the statistical cosmic improbability of speciation is insisted by some biblical creationists. Notable Pauline exponents have interpreted the apostle Paul as prescribing a historical Adam, and Christian commentators and genealogists of the Book of Genesis have contended that Adam and immediate posterity, are not intimated as being from the proposed high antiquity of modern thinkers.

Paisley and other fundamentalists were committed, public creationists, Paisley interpreting the days of Genesis as 'ordinary,' yet he preached on the Chaos-Restitution (Gap) interpretation, a view previously held by John Wesley, Thomas Chalmers and others. Fundamentalist creationism has become synonymous with young-earth creationism, yet the reformed tradition has encompassed old earth, including young biosphere and gap creationism. Those who interpreted the Bible as intimating time before Gen. 1.3 (Day 1) of the Genesis Week, considered the implication of the earth's prior temporary stasis. Thus, any anterior, animated creative sequence(s) of the earth (i.e. Genesis 1 as a reconstitution of life prior to the introduction of mankind) was cordially debated on exegetical (e.g. Gen. 7.17-24, Exod. 20.11) and paleontological (e.g. 'living fossils', the dinosaurs' demise, features of extant and recently-extinct animals etc.) grounds.

The works of Charles Hodge (Systematic Theology, Vol. II) and Herman Bavinck (Reformed Dogmatics, Vol. II) on creation have influenced Reformed communities. Incomplete Hebrew knowledge and understanding of purposes, leads to inadequate translation and interpretation, and the limitations of contemporary scientific methods/consensus and historical mutability of science, also produces a reverent appraisal in the early chapters of the Bible and faith in the God of scripture. William Buckland, François Gaussen, John Harris, John Burgon, Charles H. Spurgeon, Paton James Gloag, James Gall, R. A. Torrey and Gleason Archer Jr. also professed a non-exhaustive historical approach to Genesis 1 to 3. A dynamic antediluvian period (e.g. volcanic-tectonic activity, floods, landslides, tsunamis, high sedimentation and subsistence rates etc.) and Noahic deluge, were debated as causes of novel geological phenomena, including the formation of certain sedimentary strata, and by extension, an explanation of certain fossils and any pressure-induced impact on chemical elements in fossil-bearing sedimentary rocks. Prof. Edgar Andrews is contemporarily associated with this form of cataclysmic geology, and the highest known rates of permineralization, replacement and compression of mammalian skeletal remains, have been contemporarily correlated with the biblical genealogical timespan. Critical doubt concerning the animalian source, antiquity and modern human relevance of trace fossils, singularly the alleged hominin footprints, exists too. The marked lack and obscurity of ancient Homo sapiens trace fossils is similarly identified. Watchman Nee among others, asserted a "mystery" to the Genesis account. Creation has also been affirmed as an important foundation of redemptive faith, and sincere history is considered to commence with 'developed man;' the distinctive Biblical history's revelation of the generation of Adam is appraised as satisfaction of an authentic and prophetic historical record, partially reflected in ANE literature. The written scriptural details when interpreted, are considered the only source of any (necessary) dogmatic affirmations.

Current Western accentuation on the remote beginning of life and the cosmos (i.e. etiology, including cosmogenesis and anthropogeny), and the historical traditions of information societies, are seen as driving factors in the elevation of evolutionary theories in opposition to the actual existence of a creator God. Criticisms of the present incentives (pecuniary and philosophical) of scientific institutions in determining research, have been made. Attention has been drawn to secular hostility to teleology, the development of scientific theology (e.g. theobiology and theophysics) and the creation science movement.

== See also ==
- Conservative evangelicalism in the United Kingdom#
- Epistle of Jude
- Princeton theology
- Neo-Calvinism
- New Calvinism

== Resources ==
- Dr. Ken Matto's KJV 770 verse comparisons
