= Biblical literalism =

Approach to the interpretation of the Bible

Biblical literalism or biblicism is the strict adherence to the exact, plain sense of words or depictions in the Bible.

The term can refer to the historical-grammatical method, a hermeneutic technique that strives to uncover the meaning of the text by taking into account not just the grammatical words, but also the syntactical aspects, the cultural and historical background, and the literary genre. It emphasizes the referential aspect of the words in the text without denying the relevance of literary aspects, genre, or figures of speech within the text (e.g., parable, allegory, simile, or metaphor). It does not necessarily lead to complete agreement upon one single interpretation of any given passage. This Christian fundamentalist and evangelical hermeneutical approach to scripture is used extensively by fundamentalist Christians, in contrast to the historical-critical method of mainstream Judaism, Catholicism or Mainline Protestantism.

Sociologists sometimes use the term to describe broader conservative Christian beliefs, including biblical inerrancy. Surveys indicate that around 30% of Americans interpret the Bible literally, while a larger plurality views it as inspired but not necessarily literal. Historically, the reverence for sacred scripture in Judeo-Christian traditions developed through the processes of canonization of the Hebrew Bible and the New Testament, establishing texts as central to religious identity. Early Christian thinkers such as Origen and Augustine debated literal versus metaphorical interpretations, while the Reformation and later Protestant movements emphasized a literal understanding of canonical scripture, particularly the smaller Protestant Bible.

Biblical literalists generally maintain that passages should be read as historical fact unless the author clearly intended allegory or metaphor, applying contextual interpretation to resolve cultural or literary gaps. This approach underlies doctrines such as the clarity of scripture, which asserts that the Bible’s core teachings are accessible to ordinary readers, and the Chicago Statement on Biblical Inerrancy, affirming interpretation according to the text’s grammatical-historical sense. Critics, including scholars using historical-critical methods, argue that literalism is untenable because the Bible contains contradictions, numerical discrepancies, and culturally contingent descriptions, such as a flat, immovable earth. Critics further contend that strict literalism can undermine faith by presenting a rigid, overly simplistic view of scripture that fails to account for nuance, literary forms, and historical context, contributing to intellectual and theological challenges for adherents.

== Background ==
Fundamentalists and evangelicals sometimes refer to themselves as literalists or biblical literalists. Sociologists also use the term in reference to conservative Christian beliefs which include not just literalism but also biblical inerrancy.

A 2011 Gallup survey reports, "Three in 10 Americans interpret the Bible literally, saying it is the actual word of God. That is similar to what Gallup has measured over the last two decades, but down from the 1970s and 1980s. A 49% plurality of Americans say the Bible is the inspired word of God but that it should not be taken literally, consistently the most common view in Gallup's nearly 40-year history of this question. Another 17% consider the Bible an ancient book of stories recorded by man."

== History ==
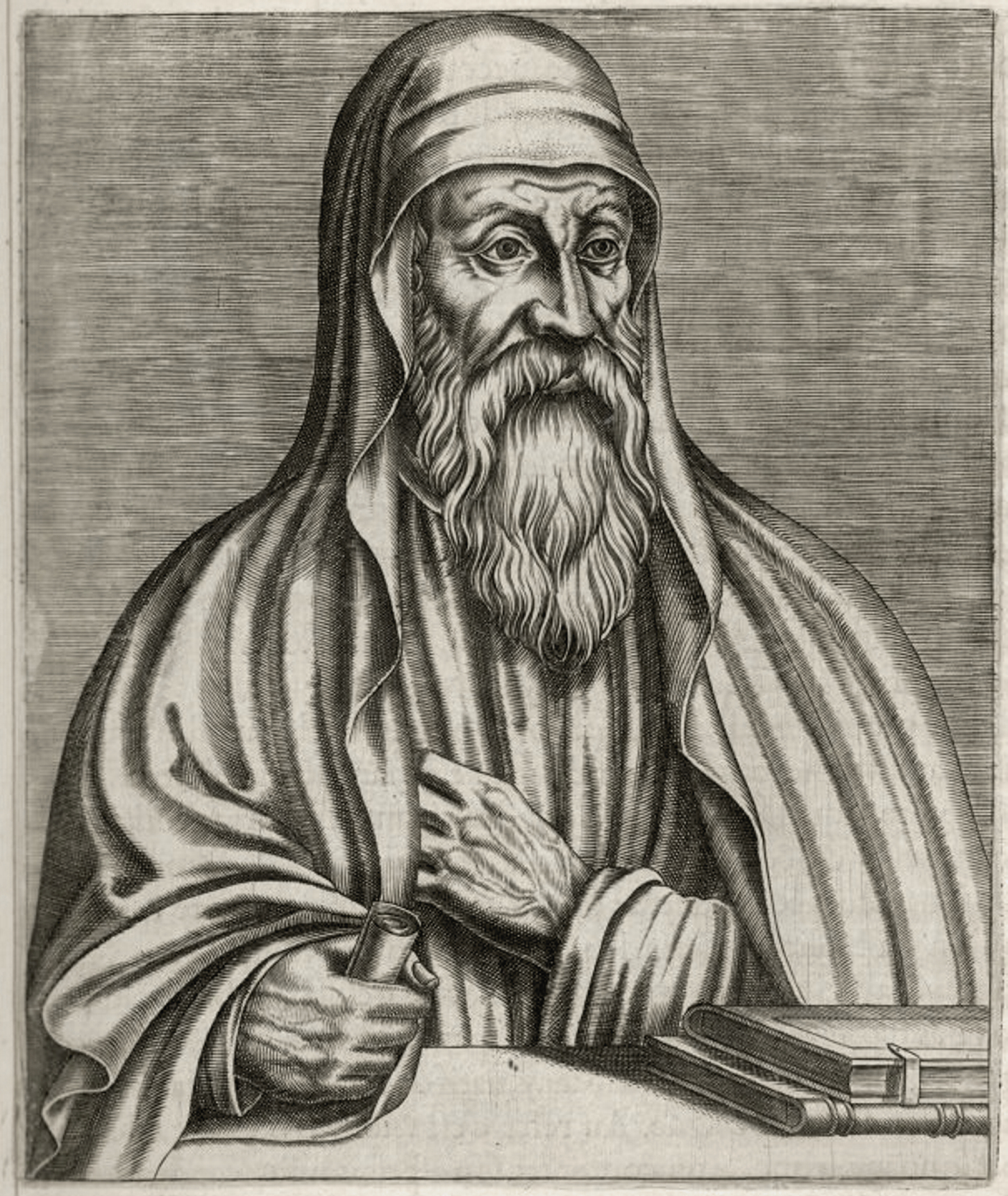
Imaginative portrayal of Origen by André Thévet

The high regard for religious scriptures in the Judeo-Christian tradition seems to relate in part to a process of canonization of the Hebrew Bible, which occurred over the course of a few centuries from approximately 200 BCE to 200 CE. In the Jewish tradition, the highly regarded written word represented a direct conduit to the mind of God, and the later rabbinical school of Judaism encouraged the attendant scholarship that accompanied a literary religion. Similarly, the canonization of the New Testament by the Early Christian Church became an important aspect in the formation of the separate religious identity for Christianity. Ecclesiastical authorities used the acceptance or rejection of specific scriptural books as a major indicator of group identity, and it played a role in the determination of excommunications in Christianity and in cherem in the Jewish tradition.

Origen (184–253 CE), familiar with reading and interpreting Hellenistic literature, taught that some parts of the Bible ought to be interpreted non-literally. Concerning the Genesis account of creation, he wrote: "who is so silly as to believe that God ... planted a paradise eastward in Eden, and set in it a visible and palpable tree of life ... [and] anyone who tasted its fruit with his bodily teeth would gain life?" He also proposed that such hermeneutics should be applied to the gospel accounts as well.

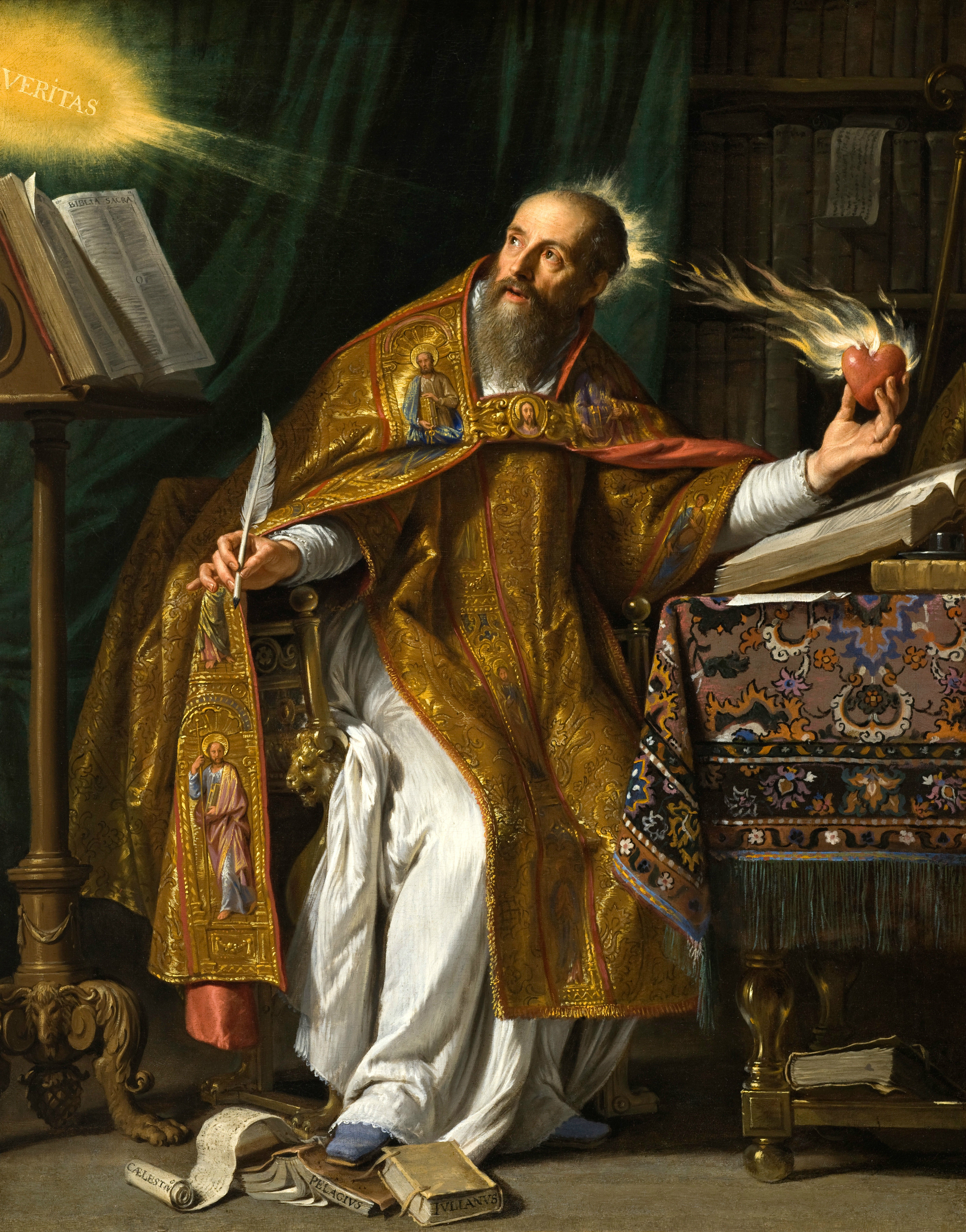
Portrait of Augustine of Hippo by Philippe de Champaigne, 17th century

Church Father Augustine of Hippo (354–430 CE) wrote of the need for reason in interpreting Jewish and Christian scripture, and of much of the Book of Genesis being an extended metaphor. But Augustine also implicitly accepted the literalism of the creation of Adam and Eve, and he explicitly accepted the literalism of the virginity of Jesus's mother Mary.

In the Reformation, Martin Luther (1483–1546 CE) separated the biblical apocrypha from the rest of the Old Testament books in his 1534 Bible, reflecting scholarly doubts that had continued for centuries, and the Westminster Confession of 1646 demoted them to a status that denied their canonicity. American Protestant literalists and biblical inerrantists have adopted this smaller Protestant Bible as a work not merely inspired by God but, in fact, representing the Word of God without possibility of error or contradiction.

Biblical literalism first became an issue in the 18th century, enough so for Diderot to mention it in his Encyclopédie. Karen Armstrong sees "[p]reoccupation with literal truth" as "a product of the scientific revolution".

== Clarity of the text ==
The vast majority of evangelical and fundamentalist Christians regard the Biblical text as clear, and believe that the average person may understand the basic meaning and teachings of the Bible. The doctrine has resulted in an estimated 45,000 different Protestant schools of thought. Such Christians often refer to the teachings of the Bible rather than to the process of interpretation itself. The doctrine of clarity of the text does not mean that no interpretative principles are necessary, or that there is no gap between the culture in which the Bible was written and the culture of a modern reader. On the contrary, exegetical and interpretative principles come into play as part of the process of closing that cultural gap. The doctrine does deny that the Bible is a code to decipher, or that understanding it requires complex academic analysis as is typical in the historical-critical method of interpretation.

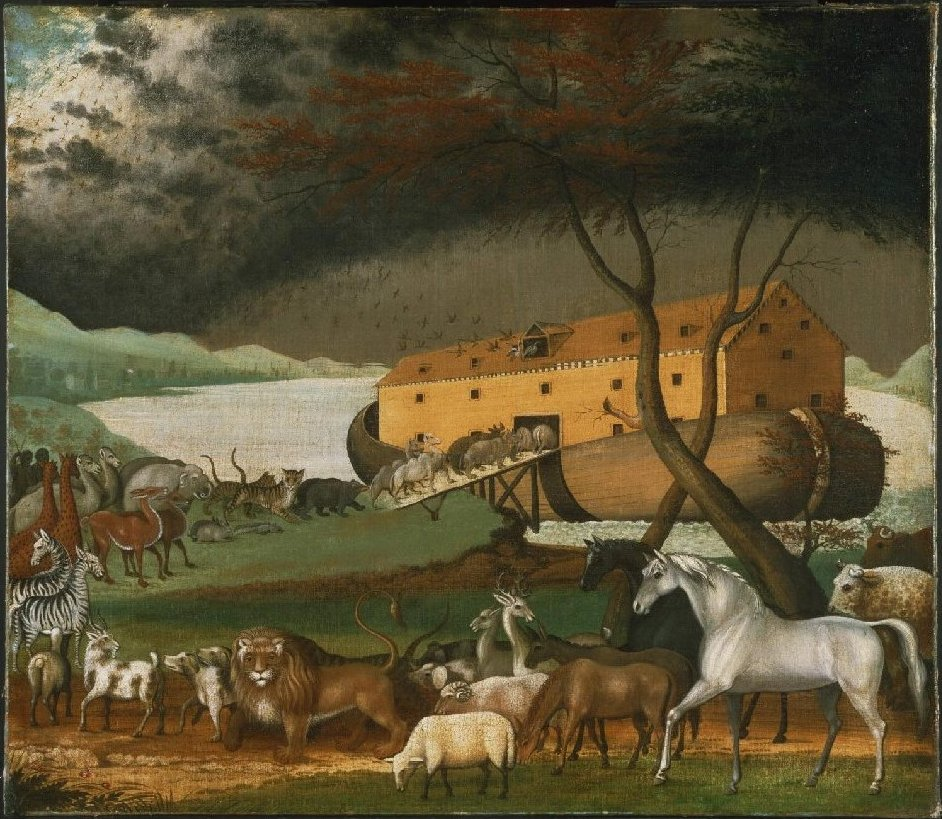
Biblical literalists believe that the story of Noah's Ark (depicted in this painting by Edward Hicks) is historically accurate.

Biblical literalists believe that, unless a passage is clearly intended by the writer as allegory, poetry, or some other genre, the Bible should be interpreted as literal statements by the author. Critics argue that allegorical intent can be ambiguous. Fundamentalists typically treat as simple history, according to its plain sense, passages such as those that recount the Genesis creation, the Genesis flood narrative and Noah's Ark, and the unnaturally long life-spans of the patriarchs given in genealogies of Genesis, as well as the strict historicity of the narrative accounts about the ancient Israelites, the supernatural interventions of God in history, and Jesus's miracles. Literalism does not deny that parables, metaphors and allegory exist in the Bible, but rather relies on contextual interpretations based on apparent authorial intention.

As a part of the Chicago Statement on Biblical Inerrancy, conservative Christian scholarship affirms the following:

WE AFFIRM the necessity of interpreting the Bible according to its literal, or normal, sense. The literal sense is the grammatical-historical sense, that is, the meaning which the writer expressed. Interpretation according to the literal sense will take account of all figures of speech and literary forms found in the text.
WE DENY the legitimacy of any approach to Scripture that attributes to it meaning which the literal sense does not support.

== Criticism by historical-critical methodology scholars ==
Steve Falkenberg, professor of religious psychology at Eastern Kentucky University, observed:

I've never met anyone who actually believes the Bible is literally true. I know a bunch of people who say they believe the Bible is literally true but nobody is actually a literalist. Taken literally, the Bible says the earth is flat and setting on pillars and cannot move (1 Chr 16:30, Ps 93:1, Ps 96:10, 1 Sam 2:8, Job 9:6). Additionally, it says that great sea monsters are set to guard the edge of the sea (Job 41, Ps 104:26).

Conrad Hyers, professor of comparative religion at Gustavus Adolphus College in St. Peter, Minnesota, criticizes biblical literalism as a mentality that:

does not manifest itself only in conservative churches, private-school enclaves, television programs of the evangelical right, and a considerable amount of Christian bookstore material; one often finds a literalist understanding of Bible and faith being assumed by those who have no religious inclinations, or who are avowedly antireligious in sentiment. Even in educated circles the possibility of more sophisticated theologies of creation is easily obscured by burning straw effigies of biblical literalism.

Robert Cargill responded to viewers' questions on the History Channel series explaining why academic scholarship rejects forms of biblical literalism:

If I may be so bold, the reason you don't see many credible scholars advocating for the 'inerrancy' of the Bible is because, with all due respect, it is not a tenable claim. The Bible is full of contradictions and, yes, errors. Many of them are discrepancies regarding the numbers of things in the Books of Samuel and Kings and the retelling of these in the Books of Chronicles. All credible Bible scholars acknowledge that there are problems with the Biblical text as it has been received over the centuries. ... The question is not whether or not there are discrepancies and, yes, errors in the Bible, but whether or not these errors fundamentally undermine the credibility of the text. Even the most conservative, believing, faithful Biblical scholars acknowledge these problems with the text. This is why we don't find any scholars that subscribe to 'Biblical inerrancy' (to my knowledge) on the show.

Christian Smith wrote in his 2012 book, The Bible Made Impossible: Why Biblicism Is Not a Truly Evangelical Reading of Scripture:

The real problem is the particular biblicist theory about the Bible; it not only makes young believers vulnerable to being disabused of their naive acceptance of that theory but it also often has the additional consequence of putting their faith commitments at risk. Biblicism often paints smart, committed youth into a corner that is for real reasons impossible to occupy for many of those who actually confront its problems. When some of those youth give up on biblicism and simply walk across the wet paint, it is flawed biblicism that is partly responsible for those losses of faith.

== See also ==
- Allegorical interpretation of the Bible
- Martin Anstey
- Application of textual criticism to religious documents
- Bila Kayf — Islamic analogue
- Biblical archaeology
- Biblical inspiration
- Biblical literalist chronology
- Book of Nepos
- Demythologization
- Parallelomania
- Pardes
- Peshat
- Young Earth creationism

== Literature ==
- Ehrman, Bart D. (2005). Misquoting Jesus: The Story Behind Who Changed the Bible and Why. HarperCollins. ISBN 978-0-06-073817-4
- Metzger, Bruce M. (1997). The Canon of the New Testament: Its Origin, Development, and Significance. Oxford: Clarendon Press. ISBN 978-0-198-26180-3.
