= Cornelius a Lapide =

Flemish Jesuit priest and exegete (1567–1637)

The Reverend Cornelius a Lapide SJ
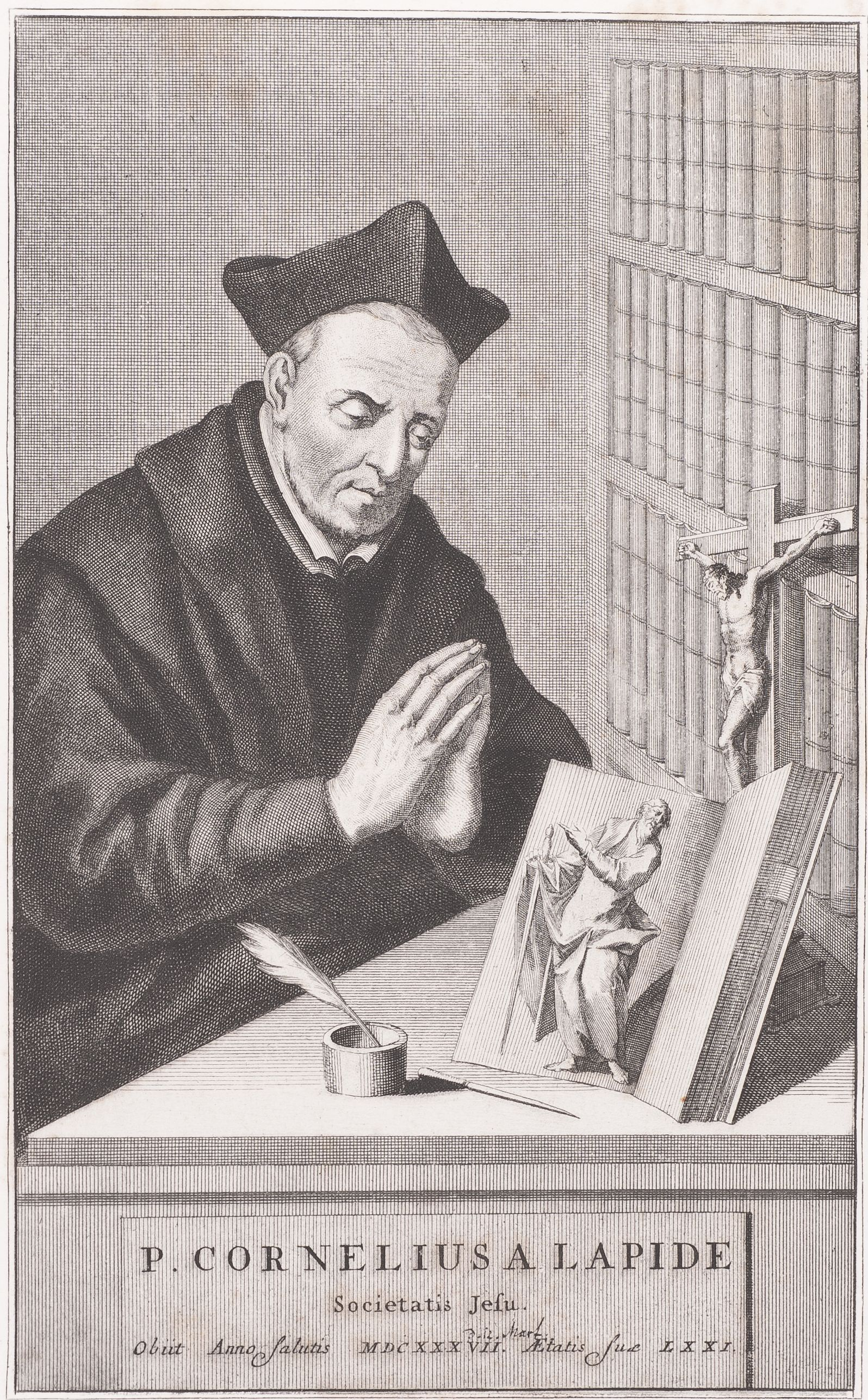
- Born: Cornelis Cornelissen van den Staen; 28 December 1567; Bocholt, Spanish Netherlands
- Died: 12 March 1637 (aged 69); Rome, Papal States

Academic background
- Education: University of Douai; Old University of Leuven

Academic work
- Discipline: philosophy theology
- Institutions: Pontifical Gregorian University; Old University of Leuven
- Notable works: Les trésors de Cornelius a Lapide

Cornelius Cornelii a Lapide, SJ (né Cornelis Cornelissen van den Steen; 28 December 1567 – 12 March 1637) was a Flemish Jesuit priest and noted exegete of Sacred Scripture.

== Life ==
Lapide was born in Bocholt, Belgium. He studied humanities and philosophy at the Jesuit colleges in Maastricht and Cologne, first theology for half a year at the University of Douai and afterwards for four years at the Old University of Leuven; he entered the Society of Jesus on 11 June 1592 and, after a novitiate of two years and another year of theology, was ordained a Catholic priest on 24 December 1595. After teaching philosophy for half a year, he was made a professor of Sacred Scripture at Leuven in 1596 and professor of Hebrew in 1597. During his professorship at Leuven, he spent his holidays preaching and administering the Sacraments, especially at the pilgrimage of Scherpenheuvel (Montaigu).

In 1616, Lapide was called to Rome in the same capacity, where, on 3 November, he assumed the office that he held for many years thereafter. The latter years of his life, however, he apparently devoted himself exclusively to completing and correcting his commentaries. He died in Rome on 12 March 1637.

Lapide described himself in a prayer to the prophets at the end of his commentary on the Book of Daniel: "For nearly thirty years I suffer with and for You [God] with gladness the continual martyrdom of religious life, the martyrdom of illness, the martyrdom of study and writing; obtain for me also, I beseech You, to crown all, the fourth martyrdom, of blood. For You I have spent my vital and animal spirits; I will spend my blood too."

== Works ==
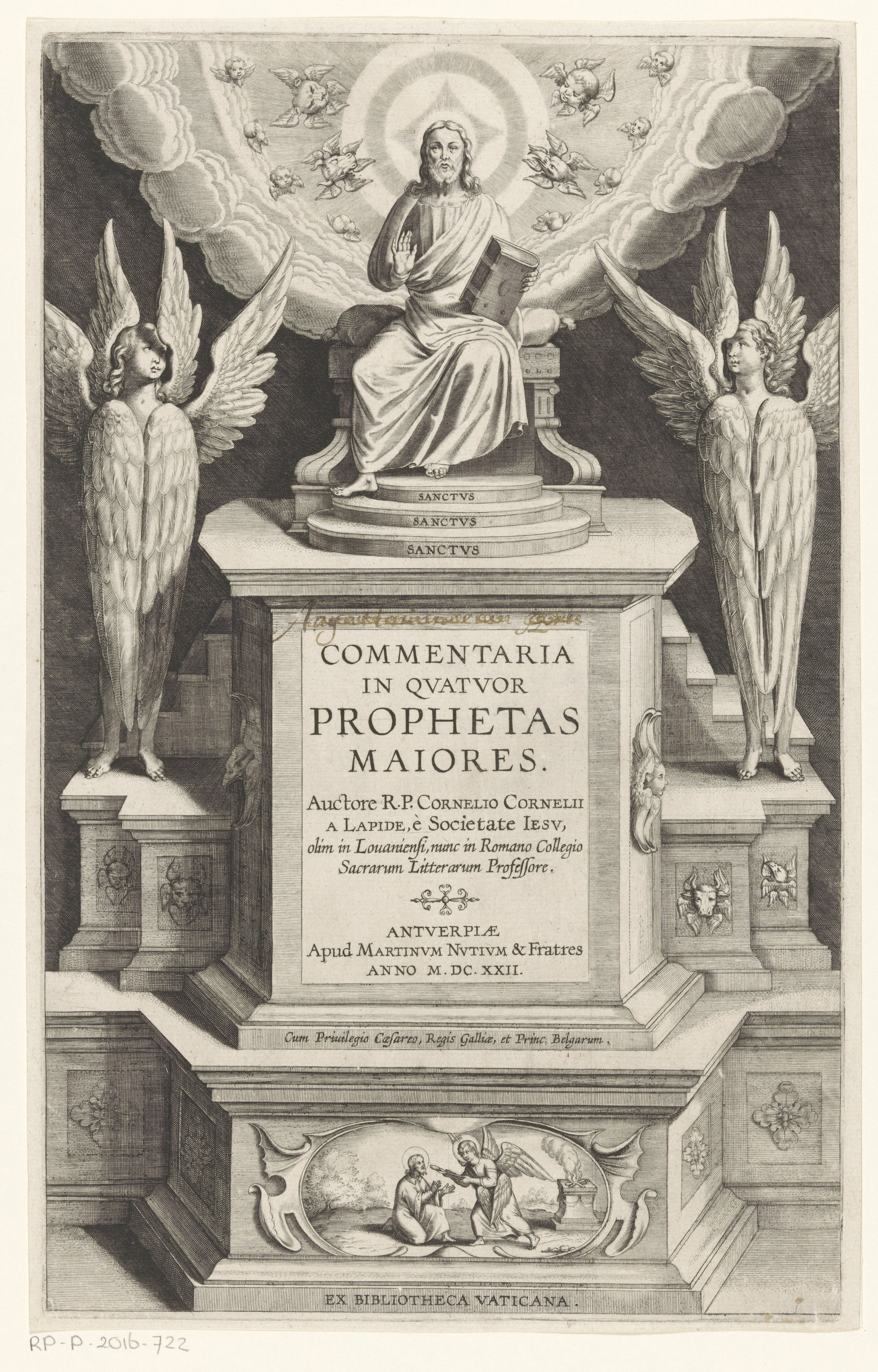
Cornelius a Lapide, Commentaria in quatuor prophetas maiores. Antwerpen: Nutius, Martinus (III), 1622.

Cornelius a Lapide wrote commentaries on all the books of the Catholic Canon of Scripture, i.e., including the deuterocanonical books, except the Book of Job and the Psalms. Even before departing Flanders, he edited the Commentaries in omnes divi Pauli epistolas in 1614 and In Pentateuchum (On the Pentateuch) in 1616, both in Antwerp. The commentaries on the Greater and Lesser Prophets, Acts of the Apostles, Canonical Epistles and the Apocalypse of Saint John, Wisdom of Sirach, and Book of Proverbs followed later. The remainder were edited posthumously, and all of them have been re-edited several times severally and collectively. Of the Commentary on the Epistles of Saint Paul he lived to see at least 11 editions.

The complete series, with the Book of Job and the Psalms added by others, was published in Antwerp in 1681 and 1714; in Venice in 1717, 1740, and 1798; in Cologne in 1732; in Turin in 1838; in Lyon in 1839–1842, 1865, and 1866; in Malta in 1843–1846; in Naples in 1854; in Lyon and Paris in 1855 and 1856; in Milan in 1857; and in Paris in 1859–1863. To the most widely mentioned edition, Crampon and Péronne added complementary annotations from later interpreters. A large work in four volumes, Les trésors de Cornelius a Lapide: extraits de ses commentaires de l'écriture sainte à l'usage des prédicateurs, des communautés et des familles chrétiennes by Abbé Barbier was published in Le Mans and Paris in 1856, re-edited in Paris in 1859, 1872, 1876, 1885, and 1896; and translated into Italian by F. M. Faber and published in Parma in 1869–1870, in 10 volumes over 16 months.

All of the aforementioned commentaries are great in scope. They explain not only the literal, but also the allegorical, tropological, and anagogical senses of the Sacred Scriptures and provide numerous quotations of the Church Fathers and mediaeval interpreters. Like most of his predecessors and contemporaries, a Lapide intended to serve the historical and scientific study of the Sacred Scriptures and, more so, pious meditation and especially homiletic exposition. An extract from the commentary on the Acts of the Apostles appeared in 1737 in Tyrnau under the title Effigies Sancti Pauli, sive idea vitae apostolicae.

== Legacy and translations ==
G. H. Goetzius authored an academic dissertation, Exercitatio theologica de Cornelii a Lapide Commentariis in Sacram Scripturam (Leipzig, 1699), in which he praised a Lapide as the most important Catholic scriptural commentator.

Thomas W. Mossman, an Anglican clergyman, translated some of the New Testament commentaries into English under the title The Great Commentary of Cornelius a Lapide (London, 1876):

- The Four Gospels
- The epistles to the Corinthians and the Galatians
- St. John's 1st, 2nd and 3rd epistles

A manuscript in the Vatican Library contains an Arabic translation of the Commentary on the Apocalypse of Saint John by the Maronite Yusuf ibn Girgis (beginning of the eighteenth century), who also purportedly translated the Commentary on the Epistles of Saint Paul.
