= Christian Fundamentalism (disambiguation) =

Christian Fundamentalism can refer to:

- A series of essays called The Fundamentals, published from 1910 to 1915
- Christian Fundamentalism (religious movement) based on the viewpoints in these essays
- The Fundamentalist–Modernist Controversy of the 1920s and 1930s within US Presbyterian and other Churches
- Reformed Fundamentalism within Calvinist Protestant groups
- Christian versions of Fundamentalism, in the broader sense of the term
- The Christian right in the US

== See also ==
- Conservative Christianity
