= Christian allegory =

Christian allegory may refer to:

- Allegory § Biblical allegory
  - Allegorical interpretation of the Bible
- Allegory § Medieval allegory
- Christian literature § Christian allegory

== See also ==
- Christian mythology
- Christian symbolism
- Parables of Jesus
