= Martin Anstey =

Martin Anstey (1860 – 5 February 1921) was an English Bible chronologer significant for his contribution to biblical literalism and approach to resolving the apparent time gaps contained within the Bible's internal chronology. In 1913 Anstey's book, The Romance of Bible Chronology was published, explaining how subtle pieces of information within the Bible text resolve these apparent chronological gaps.

Anstey was the brother of John Anstey and also a keen Anstey genealogist, mapping many of the early branches of the Devon Ansteys.

Anstey died on 5 February 1921 in Malvern.

== The Romance of Bible Chronology ==
Anstey identified five apparent chronological gaps within the Bible text, that had been attempted to be resolved with varying degrees of success by previous Bible chronologers. The five apparent chronological gaps that Anstey identified were:

1. The Noah-Shem connection, which determines the exact age of Noah at the birth of Shem, (which Anstey calculated to be 502 years).
2. The Terah-Abraham connection, which determines the exact age of Terah at the birth of Abraham, (which Anstey calculated to be 130 years).
3. The Joseph-Moses connection, which determines the exact number of years which elapsed between the death of Joseph, with which the Chronology of the book of Genesis ends (Gen. 50:26), and the birth of Moses, with which the Chronology of the book of Exodus begins (Exodus 7:7), (which Anstey calculated to be 64 years).
4. The Joshua-Judges connection, which determines the number of years that elapsed during the administration of Joshua and the Elders that survived him, between the division of the land at the end of the Seven Years' War of Conquest, with which the Chronology of the Book of Joshua ends (Joshua 14:7,10 with Numbers 10:11,12; 13:17,20), and the oppression of Cushan-Rishathaim of Mesopotamia, with which the Chronology of the Book of Judges begins (Judges 3:8), (which Anstey calculated to be 13 years).
5. The Eli-Saul connection, which determines the number of years that elapsed between the death of Eli and the beginning of the reign of Saul, (which Anstey calculated to be 20 years). This is given in the summary of I Samuel 7:2.

== Legacy and impact ==
Having resolved the apparent chronological gaps in the Bible text, Anstey was able to argue that the Bible provided a coherent yet select historical record of human civilization. Anstey's thesis also critiqued other chronological records for their chronological errors compared to the Bible text. While archaeological discoveries during the twentieth and twenty-first century have in some instances dated the arguments and data presented in Anstey's thesis, his original chronological calculations and observations remain accurate.

A 1949 review of Romance of Bible Chronology in The Journal of Education calls it "a standard chronology of the Old Testament—a revision of Ussher's dates... in light of recent discoveries and modern research." The review praises Anstey's work: "Only once in several generations is such a service rendered the English speaking people."

== Other Works ==
- How to Master the Bible: An Exposition of the Method, a Demonstration of the Power, and a Revelation of the Joy of Bible Study (London: Victory Press, 1931)

== See also ==
- List of artifacts in biblical archaeology
