= Historical-grammatical method =

Christian hermeneutical method

The historical-grammatical method is a modern Christian hermeneutical method that strives to discover the biblical authors' original intended meaning in the text. According to the historical-grammatical method, if based on an analysis of the grammatical style of a passage (with consideration to its cultural, historical, and literary context), it appears that the author intended to convey an account of events that actually happened, then the text should be taken as representing history; passages should only be interpreted symbolically, poetically, or allegorically if to the best of our understanding, that is what the writer intended to convey to the original audience. It is the primary method of interpretation for many conservative exegetes who reject the historical-critical method to various degrees (from complete rejection by some fundamentalist Protestants, to moderated acceptance by the Roman Catholic tradition since the Divino afflante Spiritu encyclical letter), in contrast to the overwhelming reliance on historical-critical interpretation in biblical studies at the academic level.

The historical-grammatical method arose in the context of the Enlightenment in the Western world. Prior to this, Medieval Christianity tended to emphasize the four senses of Scripture: the literal, allegorical, moral, and anagogical; however, interpretation was always subject to the Church's magisterium. The process for determining the original meaning of the text is through examination of the grammatical and syntactical aspects, the historical background, the literary genre as well as theological (canonical) considerations. While there is not a common Eastern Orthodox Christian hermeneutic, Orthodox scholars tend to draw upon spiritual and allegorical readings of the Bible, in conversation with the Church Fathers and the Church's traditions.

== Historical development ==
The historical-grammatical method appeared in the eighteenth century when German scholars applied philological and the nascent scholarly historiographical methods to biblical studies, guided by the Enlightenment rationality. The founder of historical-grammatical method was the scholar Johann August Ernesti (1707–1781) who, while not rejecting the historical-critical method of his time, emphasized the perspicuity of Scripture, the principle that the Bible communicates through the normal use of words and grammar, making it understandable like any other book. Ernesti's set of interpretive principles and practices first received the name the historical-grammatical method or historical-grammatical method of interpretation in the book Elementa Hermeneutices Novi Testamenti (1811) by Karl Augustus Theophilos Keil (1754–1818). "In passing mention ought to be made of J. A. Ernesti who so emphasized the grammatical meaning of the words that Holy Writ has no future meaning and is comparable to any other book; and also J. S. Semler, who, although he did not wish to be counted among the rationalists nevertheless advanced its cause and its prominence by his one-sided emphasis upon the historical method and by relying upon the accommodation theory, holding that Jesus adjusted himself to the views of His day."

In reaction to the appropriation of the historical-critical method by rationalist and liberal Protestant scholars, the conservative theologian and journalist Ernst Wilhelm Hengstenberg (1802–1869) embraced the historical-grammatical method as a bulwark of orthodoxy in defense of the historicity of miracles and inspiration of the Scriptures. Based on this method, scholars Franz Delitzsch (1813–1890) and Johann Friedrich Karl Keil (1807–1888) wrote extensive biblical commentaries, consolidating the existence of the historical-grammatical method, independent from both the pietist reading and the historical-critical reading of the Bible, thus separating the interpretive methods born out of the Enlightenment modernity. The translation of Ernesti's works into English by Moses Stuart and its subsequent adoption as a textbook at the Andover Theological Seminary and the Princeton Theological Seminary made the method popular among English-speaking evangelicals.

During polemics between science and religion in the Nineteenth century, the historical-critical method of biblical hermeneutics became associated with liberal theology while the "conservative" or "traditionalist" position was supposed to adopt the historical-grammatical method. However, an American pioneer of liberal theology, Hosea Ballou, employed the historical-grammatical method; while the traditional evangelical scholar, William Robertson Smith, adhered to the historical-critical method. Amid these controversies, adherents of the historical-grammatical method embraced the liberal theologian Benjamin Jowett's concept of each biblical text having only one signification determined by the authorial intent.

In the twentieth century, theologically conservative theologians claimed that their methods of exegesis were based on the historical-grammatical method. However, these conclusions were criticized by some on the basis that many exegetes who claimed to use the historical-grammatical method selectively chose historical data or performed superficial lexical analysis, and on the basis that they rejected the cornerstone concept of the method: the perspicuity of the Scriptures, which does not require cosmovision presuppositions or a special illumination by the Holy Spirit to attain the "correct interpretation" of the Scriptures.

== Original meaning of texts ==
The aim of the historical-grammatical method is to discover the meaning of the passage as the original author would have intended and what the original hearers would have understood. The original passage is seen as having only a single meaning or sense. As Milton S. Terry said, "A fundamental principle in grammatico-historical exposition is that the words and sentences can have but one significance in one and the same connection. The moment we neglect this principle we drift out upon a sea of uncertainty and conjecture."

Many practice the historical-grammatical method using the inductive method, a general three-fold approach to the text: observation, interpretation, and application. Each step builds upon the other, which follows in order. The first step of observation involves an examination of words, structure, structural relationships and literary forms. After observations are formed, then the second step of interpretation involves asking interpretative questions, formulating answers to those questions, integration and summarization of the passage. After the meaning is derived through interpretation, the third step of application involves determining both the theoretical and practical significance of the text and appropriately applying this significance to today's modern context. There is also a heavy emphasis on personal application that extends into all aspects of the practitioner's life. Theologian Robert Traina, in his 1952 Methodical Bible Study, wrote that "the applicatory step is that for which all else exists. It represents the final purpose of Bible study."

Technically speaking, the historical-grammatical method of interpretation is distinct from the determination of the passage's significance in light of that interpretation. Together, interpretation of the passage and determining the meaning define the term "hermeneutics".

== Comparison with other methods of interpretations ==
=== Other literal methods ===
The historical-grammatical method is not the only method based on a literal reading of the Bible. Among other methods are the exegesis of the ancient School of Antioch, the approach of the Karaites, the Golden-age Spanish Jewish rationalism, some scholastics like the School of St. Victor, the philological method of the Reformers, the Protestant scholasticism of the Puritans and Francis Turretin, the devotional reading of the Pietists, and the Biblical Reading method of the evangelical Victorians. What makes the Historical-grammatical method unique is its insistence on the possibility of attaining a single objective reading, based upon the Enlightenment's Cartesian rationalism or Common-Sense realism.

=== Reader-response method ===
In the reader-response method, the focus is on how the book is perceived by the reader, not on the intention of the author. While the methods focused on the Aesthetics of reception the objective is how the book is perceived by the reader without worrying about the authorial intent or original audiences, the historical-grammatical method considers the reader-response irrelevant. Reader-centered methods are diverse, including canonical criticism, confessional hermeneutics, and contextual hermeneutics. Nevertheless, the historical-grammatical method shares with reader-centered methods the interest in understanding the text as it became received by the earliest interpretive communities and throughout the history of Bible interpretation. Moreover, neither approach rejects assumptions of orthodoxy nor belief in the supernatural.

=== Historical-critical method ===
The historical-critical method is used by many academic Bible scholars in universities, including many Roman Catholic and Protestant institutions. The method uses different approaches, like source criticism, genre criticism, tradition criticism, and redaction criticism in an attempt to discover the sources and factors that contributed to the making of the text as well as to determine what it meant to the original audience. There is also a systematic use of historical, sociological, archeological, linguistic, anthropological and comparative mythology data. In short, the historical-critical method approaches the Bible in the same way it would any other ancient text. The historical-grammatical method, by contrast, has traditionally been employed with additional presuppositions, such as Biblical inspiration.

== See also ==
- Biblical genre
- Biblical inerrancy
- Biblical literalism
- Biblical theology
- Covenantalism
- Dispensationalism
- New Covenant Theology
- Higher criticism
- Postmodern Christianity
- Summary of Christian eschatological differences
- Systematic theology
- Textual criticism
