= John Anstey (politician) =

New Zealand politician

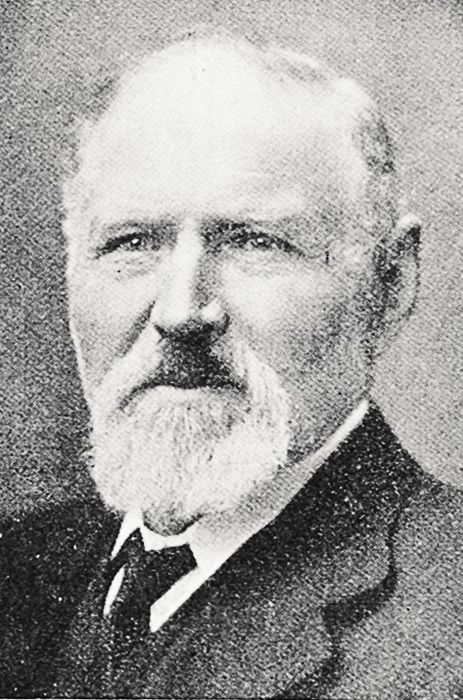
John Anstey in circa 1919

John Anstey JP (1856 – 28 August 1940) was a farmer from South Canterbury in New Zealand. He was first a member of the Legislative Council and then a Member of Parliament, representing the Liberal Party.

== Early life ==
Anstey was born in Devonshire, England in 1856, and was raised on his father's farm in Tiverton. He was the brother of Rev. Martin Anstey. He came to New Zealand in 1878 via Lyttelton. For the first three years, he worked as a shearer and engine-driver.

On 20 September 1881, he married Bessie Chamberlain of Hadstock Estate in the Ellesmere district near Christchurch. His wife was born in Cheriton Fitzpaine in Devon, which is about 9 miles (14 km) from where he grew up. In the same year, he bought land in Pareora, some 12 kilometres (7.5 mi) south of Timaru. In 1889, he leased land in Otipua and moved to that locality a few kilometres inland from Pareora.

Anstey was active with the Canterbury Farmers' Cooperative Association and eventually became its director, and was for several years on the board of the Pareora School Committee, including three years as chairperson. He became a Justice of the Peace in 1897. He was on the Timaru Borough Council, belonged to the South Canterbury Power Board from its beginning, and was a member of the Chamber of Commerce for two decades.

== Political career ==
New Zealand Parliament
Years	Term	Electorate	Party
1914–1919	19th	Waitaki	Liberal

Anstey was a member of the Royal Land Commission from 1905 and as a result of this work, he was appointed to the Legislative Council on 22 January 1907 by the Liberal Government. At the end of his term on 21 January 1914, the Reform Government was in power and he was not reappointed.

He won the Waitaki electorate in 1914, when he defeated Norton Francis of the Reform Party by 3070 votes to 2914. At the next general election in 1919, he was defeated by Reform's John Bitchener.

== Death ==
Anstey died on 28 August 1940, aged 84. He was survived by three sons and one daughter.

== Notes ==
New Zealand Parliament
Preceded by Francis Henry Smith	Member of Parliament for Waitaki; 1914–1919	Succeeded by John Bitchener
