= Four senses of Scripture =

Four-level method of interpreting the Bible

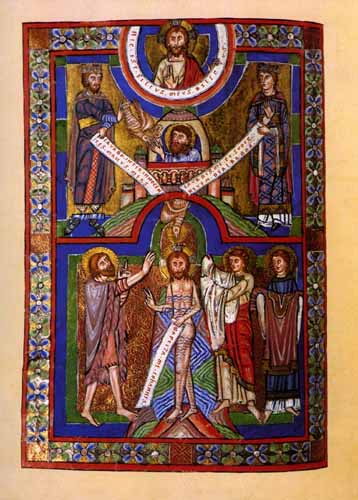
Noah and the "baptismal flood" of the Old Testament (top panel) is "typologically linked" with (it prefigures) the baptism of Jesus in the New Testament (bottom panel).

In Christianity, the four senses of Scripture is a four-level method of interpreting the Bible. The four senses are literal, allegorical, moral and anagogical. The method was developed in Late Antiquity, and was especially popular in the Latin Church during the Middle Ages.

== History ==
=== Late Antiquity ===
In Judaism, bible hermeneutics notably uses midrash, a Jewish method of interpreting the Hebrew Bible and the rules which structure the Jewish laws. The early allegorizing trait in the interpretation of the Hebrew Bible figures prominently in the massive oeuvre of a prominent Hellenized Jew of Alexandria, Philo Judaeus, whose allegorical reading of the Septuagint synthesized the traditional Jewish narratives with Platonism. Philo's allegorizing, in which he continued an earlier tradition, had little effect on later Jewish thought, in part because the Jewish culture of Alexandria dispersed by the 4th century.

In the 3rd century, the theologian Origen, a graduate of the Catechetical School of Alexandria, formulated the principle of the three senses of Scripture (literal, moral, and spiritual) from the Jewish method of interpretation used by Saint Paul in Epistle to the Galatians chapter 4. In the 4th century, the theologian Augustine of Hippo developed this doctrine which became the four senses of Scripture.

Prudentius wrote the first surviving Christian purely allegorical freestanding work, Psychomachia ("Soul-War"), in about 400. The plot consists of the personified "good" virtues of Hope, Sobriety, Chastity, Humility, etc. fighting the personified "evil" vices of Pride, Wrath, Paganism, Avarice, etc. The personifications are women, because in Latin words for abstract concepts have feminine grammatical gender; an uninformed reader of the work might take the story literally as a tale of many angry women fighting one another because Prudentius provides no context or explanation of the allegory.

In this same period of the early 5th century, three other authors of importance to the history of allegory emerged: Claudian, Macrobius, and Martianus Capella. Little is known of these authors, even if they were "truly" Christian or not. Still, we know they handed down the inclination to express learned material in allegorical form, mainly through personification, which later became a standard part of medieval schooling methods. Claudian's first work In Rufinum attacked the ruthless Rufinus and would become a model for the 12th century Anticlaudianus, a well-known allegory for how to be an upstanding man. As well his Rape of Proserpine served up a litany of mythological allegories, personifications, and cosmological allegories. Neoplatonist commentators used allegory as a rhetorical, philosophical and religious devise in reading ancient mythology, Homer, and Plato. Macrobius wrote Commentary of the Dream of Scipio, providing the Middle Ages with the tradition of a favorite topic, the allegorical treatment of dreams. Martianus Capella wrote De nuptiis Philologiae et Mercurii ("Marriage of Philology and Mercury"), the title referring to the allegorical union of intelligent learning with the love of letters. It contained short treatises on the "seven liberal arts" (grammar, rhetoric, dialectic, geometry, arithmetic, astronomy, music) and thus became a standard textbook, greatly influencing educators and students throughout the Middle Ages.

Boethius, perhaps the most influential author of Late Antiquity, first introduced readers of his work Consolation of Philosophy to the personified Lady Philosophy, the source of innumerable later personified figures (such as Lady Luck, Lady Fortune, etc.) After Boethius, there exists no known work of allegorical literature until the 12th century. Although allegorical thinking, elements, and artwork abound during this period, it was not until the rise of the medieval university in the High Middle Ages that sustained allegorical literature appeared again.

=== Middle Ages ===
Works during the Middle Ages included Hugh of St Victor (Didascalicon, 1125), Bernard Silvestris (Cosmographia, 1147), and Alanus ab Insulis (Plaint of Nature, 1170, and Anticlaudianus) who pioneered the use of allegory (mainly personification) for abstract speculation on metaphysics and scientific questions. The High and Late Middle Ages saw many allegorical works and techniques. There were four great works from this period:

- Le Roman de la Rose. A major allegorical work, it had many lasting influences on western European literature, creating entire new genres and developing vernacular languages.
- The Divine Comedy. Ranked amongst the greatest medieval works, both allegorically and as a work of literature; was and remains popular.
- Piers Plowman. An encyclopedic array of allegorical devices. Dream-vision; pilgrimage; personification; satire; typological story structure (the dreamer's progress mirrors the progress of biblical history from the Fall of Adam to the Apocalypse).
- Pearl. In a plot based on an anagogical, allegory; a dreamer is introduced to heavenly Jerusalem. Focus on the meaning of death. A religious response to Consolation of Philosophy.

== Four types ==
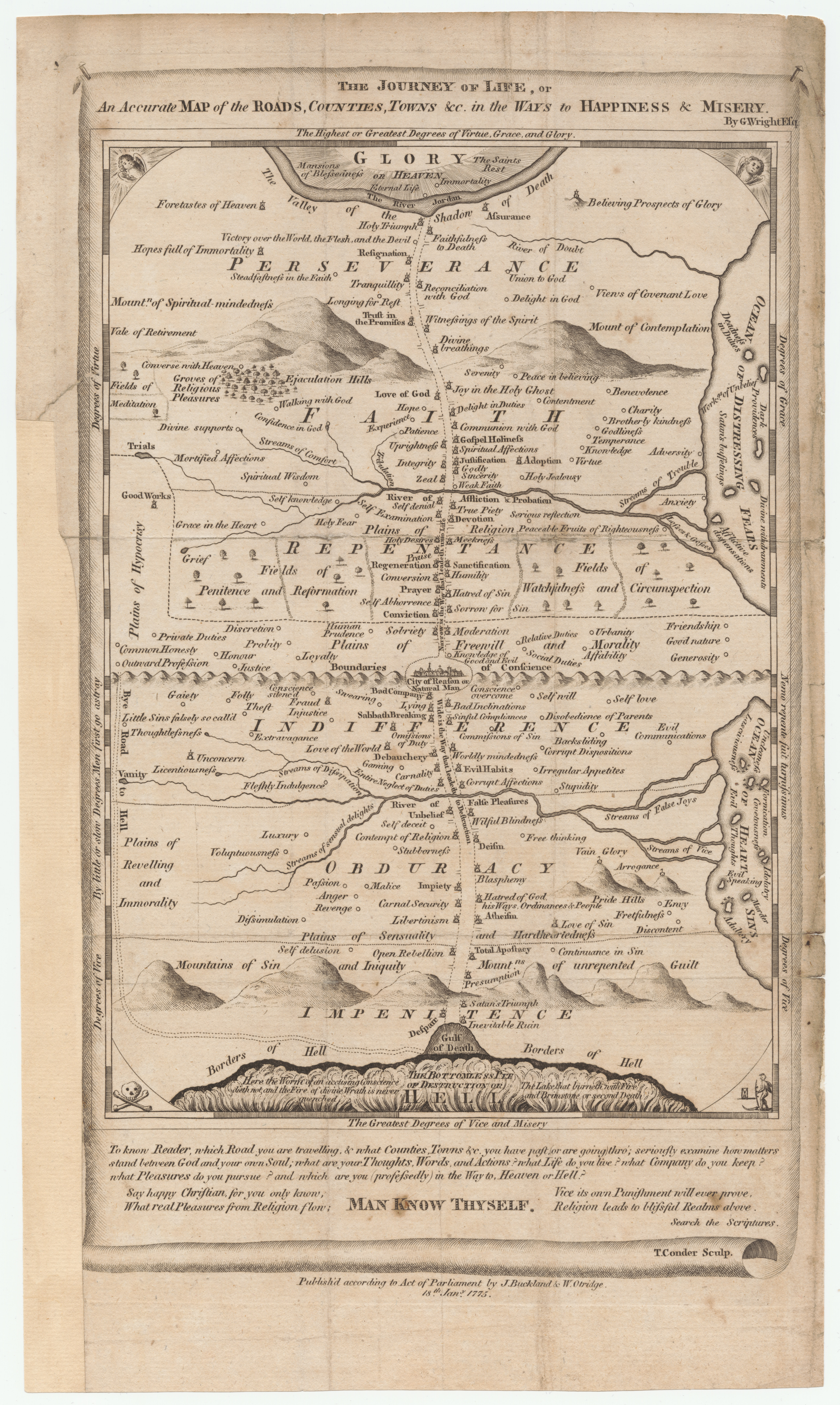
Christian allegorical map of The Journey of Life, or an Accurate Map of the Roads, Counties, Towns &c. in the Ways to Happiness & Misery, 1775

Scriptural interpretation is sometimes referred to as the Quadriga, a reference to the Roman chariot that was pulled by four horses abreast. The four horses are symbolic of the four submethods of Scriptural interpretation.

A Latin rhyme designed to help scholars remember the four interpretations survives from the Middle Ages:

Littera gesta docet, Quid credas allegoria, Moralis quid agas, Quo tendas anagogia.

The rhyme is roughly translated:

The Letter speaks of deeds;
Allegory to faith;
The Moral how to act;
Anagogy our destiny.

The first three of these modes (literal, allegorical, and moral) were part of Christian tradition as expressed by Origen. St John Cassian (c. 360–435) added the fourth mode (anagogic) in 4th century. His contemporary, St Augustine of Hippo (354–430) used the fourfold interpretive method in his explanation of Christian doctrine, On Christian Doctrine. Due to the widespread popularity of "On Christian Doctrine" in the Middle Ages, the fourfold method became the standard in Christian biblical exegesis of that period.

- Literal interpretation: explanation of the meaning of events for historical purposes from a neutral perspective by trying to understand the text in the culture and time it was written, and location and language it was composed in.
- Typological (or allegorical) interpretation: connecting the events of the Old Testament with the New Testament, particularly drawing allegorical connections between the events of Christ's life with the stories of the Old Testament. This style of interpretation can also include instances when the passage speaks directly to someone, such as when Francis of Assisi heard the passage to sell all he had.
- Tropological (or moral) interpretation: "the moral of the story", or how one should act now. Many of Jesus' parables and the Book of Proverbs and other wisdom books are packed with tropological meaning
- Anagogic interpretation: dealing with the future events of Christian history (eschatology) as well as heaven, purgatory, hell, the last judgement, the General Resurrection and second Advent of Christ, etc. (prophecies).

== Four types of interpretation ==
For most medieval thinkers there were four categories of interpretation (or meaning) used in the Middle Ages, which had originated with the Bible commentators of the early Christian era.

1. Literal interpretation of the events of the story for historical purposes with no underlying meaning.
2. Typological, which connects the events of the Old Testament with the New Testament; in particular drawing allegorical connections between the events of Christ's life with the stories of the Old Testament.
3. Moral or tropological, which is how one should act in the present, the "moral of the story".
4. Anagogical, dealing with the future events of Christian history, heaven, hell, the Last Judgment; it deals with prophecies.

Thus the four types of interpretation (or meaning) deal with past events (literal), the connection of past events with the present (typology), present events (moral), and the future (anagogical).

For example, with the Sermon on the Mount

- the literal interpretation is the narrative that Jesus went to a hill and preached;
- the allegorical/typological interpretation is that Jesus is a new Moses the Lawgiver, delivering commandments from a mountain;
- the tropological interpretation is that people should be seekers who go out of their way to listen to Christ, then be peacemakers etc.;
- the anagogical interpretation is that Christ was prophesying his own death, setting its interpretation (persecuted, with mourners, but peacemaking, etc.) with the promise of eventual blessing at the eschaton.

Dante describes interpreting through a "four-fold method" (or "allegory of the theologians") in his epistle to Cangrande. He says the "senses" of his work are not simple, but:

Rather, it may be called "polysemous", that is, of many senses. A first sense derives from the letters themselves, and a second from the things signified by the letters. We call the first sense "literal" sense, the second the "allegorical", or "moral" or "anagogical". To clarify this method of treatment, consider this verse: When Israel went out of Egypt, the house of Jacob from a barbarous people: Judea was made his sanctuary, Israel his dominion (Psalm 113). Now if we examine the letters alone, the exodus of the children of Israel from Egypt in the time of Moses is signified; in the allegory, our redemption is accomplished through Christ; in the moral sense, the conversion of the soul from the grief and misery of sin to the state of grace; in the anagogical sense, the exodus of the holy soul from slavery of this corruption to the freedom of eternal glory.. they can all be called symbolic.

The classic summary of fourfold exegesis is the following Latin doggerel verse, a widely known mnemonic device in medieval schools:

Lettera gesta docet,
quid credas allegoria,
Moralia quid agas,
quo tendas, anagogia.

Translation:

The literal teaches history,
the allegorical, what you should believe,
the moral, what you should do,
the anagogical, where you are going.

=== Old and New Testaments ===
Medieval allegory began as a Christian method for synthesizing the discrepancies between the Old Testament and the New Testament. While both testaments were studied and seen as equally divinely inspired by God, the Old Testament contained discontinuities for Christians—for example the Jewish kosher laws. The Old Testament was therefore seen in relation to how it would predict the events of the New Testament, in particular how the events of the Old Testament related to the events of Christ's life. The events of the Old Testament were seen as part of the story, with the events of Christ's life bringing these stories to a full conclusion. The technical name for seeing the New Testament in the Old is called typology.

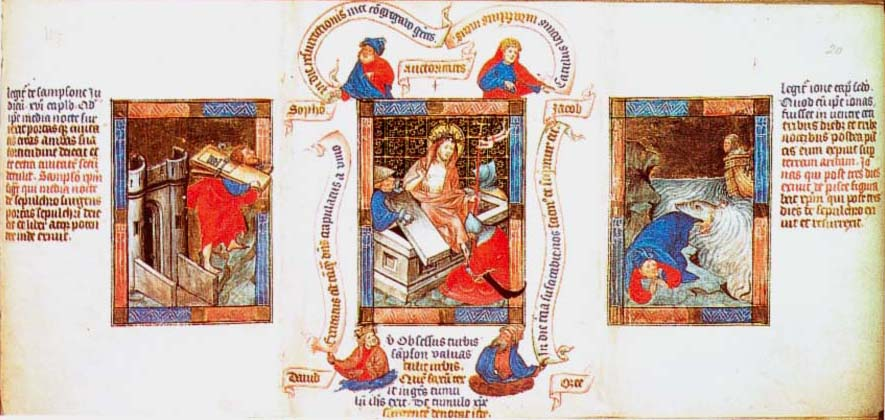
Christ rises from the tomb, alongside Jonah spit onto the beach, a typological allegory. From a 15th-century Biblia pauperum.

One example of typology is the story of Jonah and the whale from the Old Testament. Medieval allegorical interpretation of this story is that it prefigures Christ's burial, with the stomach of the whale as Christ's tomb. Jonah was eventually freed from the whale after three days, so did Christ rise from his tomb after three days. Thus, allusions to Jonah in Medieval art and literature are usually an allegory for the burial and resurrection of Christ.

Another common typological allegory is with the four major Old Testament prophets Isaiah, Jeremiah, Ezekiel, and Daniel. These four prophets prefigure the four Apostles Matthew, Mark, Luke, and John. There were multiple analogies that commentators could find between stories of the Old Testament and the New.

There also existed a tradition in the Middle Ages of mythography—the allegorical interpretation of pagan myths. Virgil's Aeneid and Ovid's Metamorphoses were standard textbooks throughout the Middle Ages, and each had a long tradition of allegorical interpretation.

"An illustrative example can be found in Siena in a painting of Christ on the cross (Sano di Pietro's Crucifix, 15th c). At the top of the cross can be seen a bird pecking its own breast, blood pouring forth from the wound and feeding its waiting chicks below. This is the pelican whose "story" was told by the Roman naturalist Pliny the Elder. Thus by analogy to a "pagan" source, Christ feeds his own children with his own blood."

Medieval philosophers also saw allegory in the natural world, interpreting animals, plants, and even non-living things in books called bestiaries as symbols of Biblical figures and morals. For example, one bestiary compares stags with people devoted to the Church, because (according to medieval zoology) they leave their pastures for other (heavenly) pastures, and when they come to broad rivers (sin) they form in line and each rests its head on the haunches of the next (supporting each other by example and good works), speeding across the waters together.

== See also ==
- Allegory in Renaissance literature
- Allegorical interpretations of Plato
- Pardes (Jewish exegesis)
- Rauðúlfs þáttr
