= John Bitchener =

New Zealand politician

The Honourable John Bitchener OBE
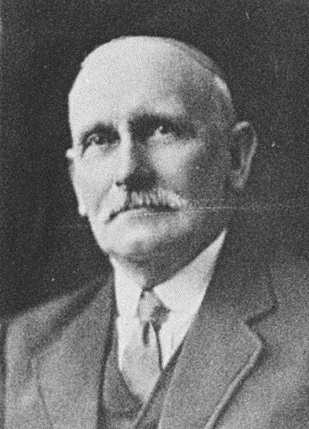

20th Minister of Works
- In office 10 April 1933 – 6 December 1935
- Prime Minister: George Forbes
- Preceded by: Gordon Coates
- Succeeded by: Bob Semple

Member of the New Zealand Parliament for Waitaki
- In office 17 December 1919 – 1 November 1935
- Preceded by: John Anstey
- Succeeded by: David Barnes

Personal details
- Born: 1864 Stagsden, Bedfordshire, England
- Died: 10 March 1952 (aged 87) New Zealand
- Resting place: Old Waimate Cemetery
- Occupation: politician

John Bitchener OBE (1864 – 10 March 1952) was a Reform Party Member of Parliament in New Zealand. He was a cabinet minister from 1933 to 1935 in the Reform Government of New Zealand.

== Early life ==
Bitchener was born in 1864 in Stagsden, Bedfordshire, England. His father was Alfred Bitchener, who was born in 1844 in Cranfield, Bedfordshire, England. His mother was Mary Ann Bitchener (née Welch), and his parents had married on 9 February 1864. John Bitchener had two younger sisters. After his wife's death, Alfred Bitchener decided to emigrate to New Zealand together with his sister Anne, who had married a brother of his late wife. The Bitchener and Welch families arrived in Lyttelton Harbour in January 1875 on the Lady Jocelyn and the Welchs had two infants at the time.

Alfred Bitchener moved to the Waimate District and worked as a farm labourer for three or four years, and then became a saw milling contractor. John Bitchener received his education at Waimate Public School and then joined his father as a contractor in Waimate, before moving to Southland for four years. His father bought a farm in Hook, some 8 kilometres (5.0 mi) southwest of Waimate, and John Bitchener moved to live there, too.

== Public roles ==
New Zealand Parliament
Years	Term	Electorate	Party
1919–1922	20th	Waitaki	Reform
1922–1925	21st	Waitaki	Reform
1925–1928	22nd	Waitaki	Reform
1928–1931	23rd	Waitaki	Reform
1931–1935	24th	Waitaki	Reform

Like his father, John Bitchener joined many organisations and took leading roles. He was chairman of the Hook School Committee, he was a member of the Waimate County Council for eleven years, was a member of the Timaru Boys' High School Board including chairman for some time, was a member of the Timaru Harbour Board, was on the Waimate High School Board, and was president of the South Canterbury Farmers' Union. He was a member of the Advisory Board of the Farmers' Union in Wellington, was chairman of the Waimate Cooperative Flour Milling Company, and a director of the Canterbury Farmers' Cooperative Association.

He was elected as Member of Parliament for Waitaki in the 1919 general election, but was defeated in 1935. He was Minister of Works under George Forbes from 10 April 1933 to 6 December 1935, when the Coalition Government was defeated.

In 1935, he was awarded the King George V Silver Jubilee Medal. In the 1950 New Year Honours, Bitchener was appointed an Officer of the Order of the British Empire for public and municipal services.

== Family ==
While living in Southland, Bitchener married Mary Laughton from Scotland in Invercargill in 1887. Their son was John Alfred Bitchener. They had a daughter, Jessie Laughton Bitchener, who died on 6 December 1895 at age four. Another daughter, Eva Laughton Bitchener, lived until old age and died in 1985 aged 89. His father, Alfred Bitchener, died suddenly in January 1918 at Waimate. His wife, Mary, died on 17 August 1946. John Bitchener died on 10 March 1952. Apart from John Alfred Bitchener, all of these are buried in the Bitchener family grave at Old Waimate Cemetery.

== Notes ==
Political offices
Preceded by Gordon Coates	Minister of Works; 1933–1935	Succeeded by Bob Semple
New Zealand Parliament
Preceded by John Anstey	Member of Parliament for Waitaki; 1919–1935	Succeeded by David Barnes
