= Conrad Hyers =

American historian of religion and minister

The Reverend Conrad Hyers
- Born: Merritt Conrad Hyers; July 31, 1933; Philadelphia, Pennsylvania, US
- Died: March 23, 2013 (aged 79); East Fallowfield Township, Pennsylvania, US
- Spouse: Geraldine Hyers

Ecclesiastical career
- Religion: Christianity (Presbyterian)
- Church: Presbyterian Church (USA)

Academic background
- Education: Carson–Newman University; Eastern Baptist Theological Seminary; Princeton Theological Seminary

Academic work
- Discipline: Religious studies
- Institutions: Beloit College; Gustavus Adolphus College

Merritt Conrad Hyers (July 31, 1933 – March 23, 2013) was an American historian of religion and ordained Presbyterian minister. He taught for many years at Gustavus Adolphus College, and wrote multiple books on humor in religion and on Zen Buddhism.

== Early life and education ==
Hyers was born on July 31, 1933, in Philadelphia, Pennsylvania. He earned a bachelor's degree at Carson–Newman University in 1954, and a bachelor of divinity from the Eastern Baptist Theological Seminary in 1958. He then earned a master of theology from the Princeton Theological Seminary in 1959, and completed his doctor of philosophy degree in theology and the philosophy of religion from the Princeton Theological Seminary in 1965.

== Academic career ==
He taught the history of religion at Beloit College and then, beginning in 1977, at Gustavus Adolphus College in St. Peter, Minnesota. In 1986 he was the inaugural winner of the Gustavus Scholarly Accomplishment Award of the college, "the highest accolade a Gustavus faculty member can receive for distinguished scholarly achievements". He retired in 1997.

== Personal life ==
In 1977 and 1978, after first arriving at Gustavus Adolphus, Hyers and his family rented an 1850-era house in St. Peter. His son, Jon Hyers, later produced a feature-length film, The Haunting of North Third Street (2007), "an independent docu-drama" alleging that the house was haunted.

Hyers died on March 23, 2013, in East Fallowfield Township, Pennsylvania.

== Books ==
- Holy Laughter: Essays on Religion in the Comic Perspective (editor, 1969)
- Once-Born, Twice-Born Zen: The Soto and Rinzai Schools of Japanese Zen (1971)
- The Chickadees: A Contemporary Fable (1974)
- Zen and the Comic Spirit (1975)
- The Comic Vision and the Christian Faith: A Celebration of Life and Laughter (1981)
- The Meaning of Creation: Genesis and Modern Science (1984)
- And God Created Laughter: The Bible as Divine Comedy (1987)
- The Laughing Buddha: Zen and the Comic Spirit (1989)
- The Spirituality of Comedy: Comic Heroism in a Tragic World (1996)
