= Anagoge =

Method of mystical or spiritual interpretation of statements or events

Anagoge (ἀναγωγή), sometimes spelled anagogy, is a Greek word suggesting a climb or ascent upwards. The anagogical is a method of mystical or spiritual interpretation of statements or events, especially scriptural exegesis, that detects allusions to the afterlife. Certain medieval theologians describe four methods of interpreting the scriptures: literal/historical, tropological/moral, allegorical/typological, and anagogical. The four methods of interpretation point in four different directions: The literal/historical backwards to the past, the allegoric forwards to the future, the tropological downwards to the moral/human, and the anagogic upwards to the spiritual/heavenly.

The Gazan ascetics Barsanuphius, John the Prophet and Dorotheus of Gaza considered the Bible anagogical in nature by considering it to have its purpose to lead people to Christ. In their view, it was not simply a moral-teaching manual that could be roughly paraphrased with a rough equivalent, but the pedagogical sense of Scripture was dependent on its anagogical capacity to lead to faith in Christ.

Hugh of Saint Victor, in De scripturis et scriptoribus sacris, distinguishes anagoge from simple allegory as a kind of allegory. He differentiates in the following way: in a simple allegory, an invisible action is (simply) signified or represented by a visible action; anagoge is that "reasoning upwards" (sursum ductio), when, from the visible, the invisible action is disclosed or revealed. In a letter to his patron Can Grande della Scala, the poet Dante explains that his Divine Comedy could be read both literally and allegorically; and that the allegorical meaning could be subdivided into the moral and the anagogical.

== See also ==
- Allegorical interpretation of the Bible
- Biblical hermeneutics
- Historical-grammatical method
- Arcs of Descent and Ascent
