= Typology (theology) =

Christian doctrine on the relationship between the Old and New Testaments

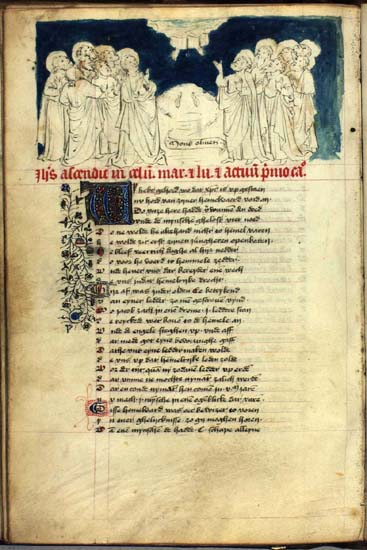
The Ascension from a Speculum Humanae Salvationis, c. 1430, see below.

In Christian theology and biblical exegesis, typology is a doctrine or theory concerning the relationship of the Old Testament to the New Testament. Events, persons or statements in the Old Testament are seen as types prefiguring or superseded by antitypes, events or aspects of Christ or his revelation described in the New Testament. For example, Jonah may be seen as the type of Christ in that he emerged from the fish's belly and thus appeared to rise from death.

In the fullest version of the theory of typology, the whole purpose of the Old Testament is viewed as merely the provision of types for Christ, the antitype or fulfillment. The theory began in the Early Church, was at its most influential in the High Middle Ages and continued to be popular, especially in Calvinism, after the Protestant Reformation, but in subsequent periods, it has been given less emphasis. In 19th-century German Protestantism, typological interpretation was distinguished from rectilinear interpretation of prophecy. The former was associated with Hegelian theologians and the latter with Kantian analyticity. Several groups favoring typology today include the Christian Brethren beginning in the 19th century (for which typology was much favoured and the subject of numerous books) and the Wisconsin Evangelical Lutheran Synod.

Notably, in the Eastern Orthodox Church, typology is still a common and frequent exegetical tool, mainly because of the church's great emphasis on continuity in doctrinal presentation through all historical periods. Typology was frequently used in early Christian art, where type and antitype would be depicted in contrasting positions.

The usage of the terminology has expanded into the secular sphere; for example, "Geoffrey de Montbray (d.1093), Bishop of Coutances, a right-hand man of William the Conqueror, was a type of the great feudal prelate, warrior and administrator".

== Etymology ==
The term is derived from the Greek noun τύπος (typos), 'a blow, hitting, stamp', and thus the figure or impression made on a coin by such action; that is, an image, figure, or statue of a man; also an original pattern, model, or mould. To this is prefixed the Greek preposition ἀντί anti, meaning 'opposite, corresponding'.

== Origin of the theory ==
Typology has Old Testament roots, although only in the sense that foreshowing and allusion are tropes in the Hebrew Bible. For example, Tom Schreiner compares Adam and Noah. According to Schreiner, Moses wrote Genesis 1–11 to show how Noah is a Second Adam. Of course, while the points of comparison between the two may be for Christians diagetic, non-Christians typically would find such similarities merely artifacts of the interpretive method. Similarly, Gordan Wenham argues that Moses also wrote of himself typologically to Noah; this assumes both that Moses wrote the Pentateuch and that typology as a creative strategy, as well as an interpretive method, can be understood as intratextual, that is relating two characters within the single work of the Hebrew Bible, which is contrary to the ordinary sense of the term. Thus, when Benjamin Sommer says that Deutero-Isaiah typologically models the servant in Isaiah 52:13–53:12 on Jeremiah, blending traits of Israel, Isaiah, and Yahweh, he uses "typology" in a non-Christian sense. The passage draws on Jeremiah 10–11, where Jeremiah’s suffering and the people’s lament provide the pattern for the servant’s own affliction. Typology also appears in the Dead Sea Scrolls.

Christian typology began in this cultural context. In the New Testament, for example, Paul in Romans 5:14 calls Adam "a type [τύπος] of the one who was to come"—i.e., a type of Christ. He contrasts Adam and Christ both in Romans 5 and in 1 Corinthians 15. The author of the First Epistle of Peter uses the term ἀντίτυπον (antitypon) to refer to baptism. There are also typological concepts in pre-Pauline strata of the New Testament.

The early Christians, in considering the Old Testament, needed to decide what its role and purpose was for them, given that Christian revelation and the New Covenant might be considered to have superseded it, and many specific Old Testament rules and requirements were no longer being followed from books such as Leviticus dealing with Expounding of the Law. One purpose of the Old Testament for Christians was to demonstrate that the Ministry of Jesus and Christ's first coming had been prophesied and foreseen, and the Gospels indeed contain many Old Testament prophecies fulfilled by Christ and quotations from the Old Testament which explicitly and implicitly link Jesus to Old Testament prophecies. Typology greatly extended the number of these links by adding others based on the similarity of Old Testament actions or situations to an aspect of Christ.

Typology is also a theory of history, seeing the whole story of the Jewish and Christian peoples as shaped by God, with events within the story acting as symbols for later events. In this role, God is often compared to a writer, using actual events instead of fiction to shape his narrative. The most famous form of this is the three-fold Hegelian dialectic pattern, although it is also used in other applications besides history.

== Development of typology ==
The system of Medieval allegory began in the Early Church as a method for synthesizing the seeming discontinuities between the Hebrew Bible (Old Testament) and the New Testament. The Church studied both testaments and saw each as equally inspired by God, yet the Old Testament contained discontinuities for Christians such as the Jewish kosher laws and the requirement for male circumcision. This therefore encouraged seeing at least parts of the Old Testament not as a literal account but as an allegory or foreshadowing of the events of the New Testament, and in particular examining how the events of the Old Testament related to the events of Christ's life. Most theorists believed in the literal truth of the Old Testament accounts, but regarded the events described as shaped by God to provide types foreshadowing Christ. Others regarded some parts of the Bible as essentially allegorical; however, the typological relationships remained the same whichever view was taken. Paul the Apostle states the doctrine in Colossians 2:16–17: "Therefore do not let anyone judge you by what you eat or drink, or with regard to a religious festival, a New Moon celebration or a sabbath day. These are a shadow of the things that were to come; the reality, however, is found in Christ." The idea also finds expression in the Letter to the Hebrews.

The development of this systematic view of the Hebrew Bible was influenced by the thought of the Hellenistic Jewish world centered in Alexandria, where Jewish philosopher Philo (c. 20 BC – c. 50 AD) and others viewed Scripture in philosophical terms (contemporary Greek literary theory highlighted foreshadowing as a literary device) as essentially an allegory, using Hellenistic Platonic concepts. Origen (184/185 – 253/254) Christianised the system, and figures including Hilary of Poitiers (c. 300 – c. 368) and Ambrose (c. 340 – 397) spread it. Saint Augustine (345–430) recalled often hearing Ambrose say that "the letter kills but the spirit gives life", and Augustine in turn became a hugely influential proponent of the system, though also insisting on the literal historical truth of the Bible. Isidore of Seville (c. 560–636) and Rabanus Maurus (c. 780 – 856) became influential as summarizers and compilers of works setting out standardized interpretations of correspondences and their meanings.

Jewish typological thought continued to develop in Rabbinic literature, including the Kabbalah, with concepts such as the Pardes, the four approaches to a biblical text.

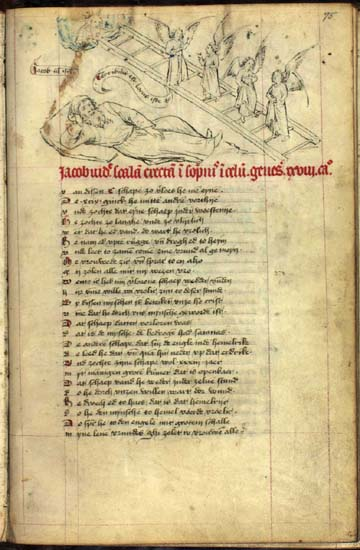
Jacob's Ladder from a Speculum Humanae Salvationis c. 1430, prefiguring the Ascension above

Typology frequently emerged in art; many typological pairings appear in sculpture on cathedrals and churches and in other media. Popular illustrated works expounding typological couplings were among the commonest books of the late Middle Ages, as illuminated manuscripts, blockbooks, and incunabula (early printed books). The Speculum Humanae Salvationis and the Biblia pauperum became the two most successful compilations.

=== Example of Jonah ===
The story of Jonah and the fish in the Old Testament offers an example of typology. In the Old Testament Book of Jonah, Jonah told his shipmates to throw him overboard, explaining that God's wrath would pass if Jonah were sacrificed, and that the sea would become calm. Jonah then spent three days and three nights in the belly of a great fish before it spat him up onto dry land.

Typological interpretation of this story holds that it prefigures Christ's burial and resurrection. The stomach of the fish represented Christ's tomb; as Jonah exited from the fish after three days and three nights, so did Christ rise from His tomb on the third day. In the New Testament, Jesus invokes Jonah in the manner of a type: "As the crowds increased, Jesus said, 'This is a wicked generation. It asks for a miraculous sign, but none will be given it except the sign of Jonah.'" Luke 11:29–32 (see also Matthew 12:38–42, 16:1–4). In Jonah 2, Jonah called the belly of the fish "She'ol", the land of the dead (translated as "the grave" in the NIV Bible).

Thus, when one finds an allusion to Jonah in Medieval art or in Medieval literature, it usually represents an allegory for the burial and resurrection of Christ. Other common typological allegories entail the four major Old Testament prophets Isaiah, Jeremiah, Ezekiel, and Daniel prefiguring the four Evangelists Matthew, Mark, Luke, and John, or the twelve tribes of Israel foreshadowing the twelve apostles. Commentators could find countless numbers of analogies between stories of the Old Testament and the New; modern typologists prefer to limit themselves to considering typological relationships that they find sanctioned in the New Testament itself, as in the example of Jonah above.

== Other Old Testament examples ==
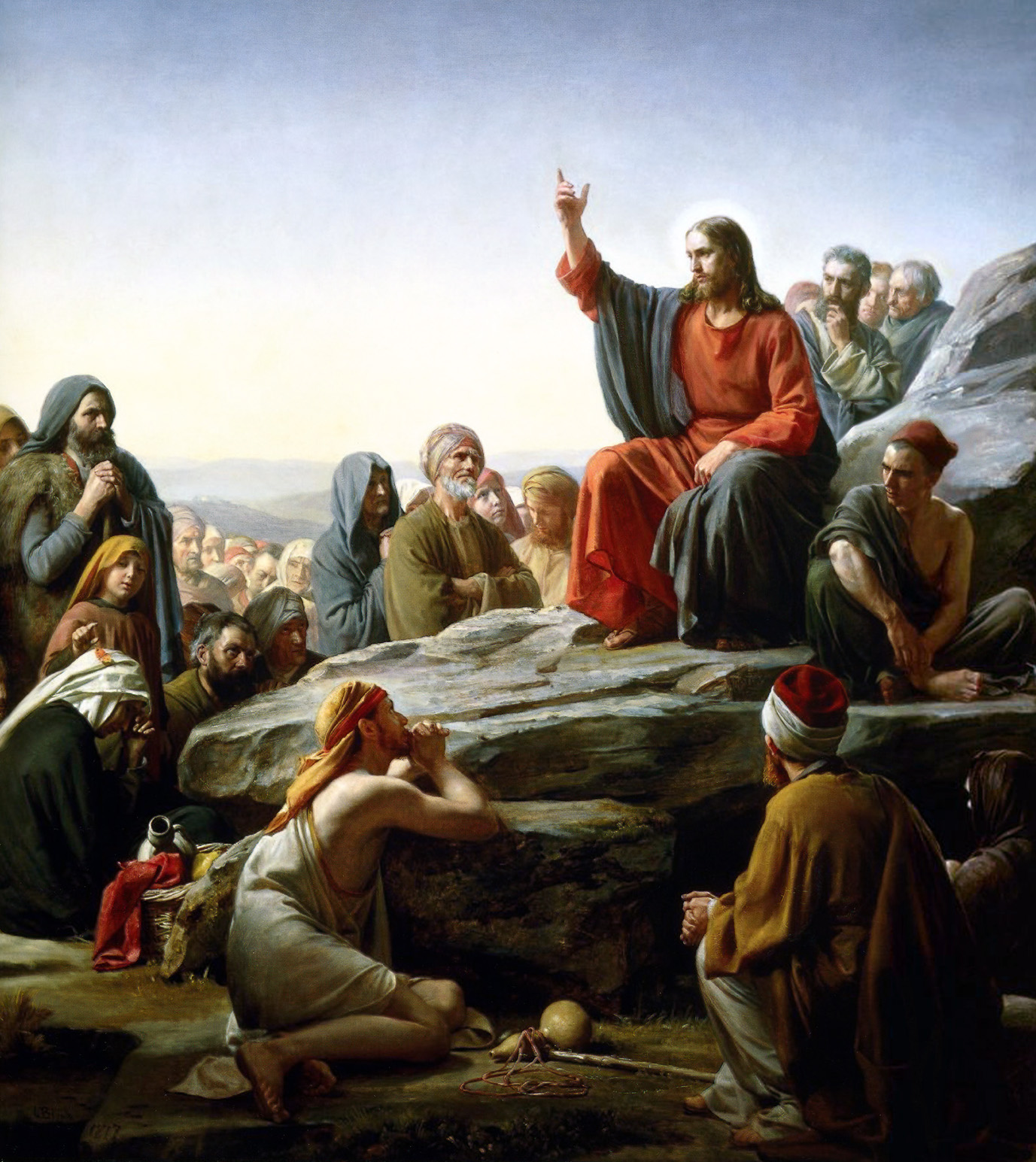
Christians believe that Jesus is the mediator of the New Covenant. In the Sermon on the Mount he commented on the Law. Some scholars consider this to be an antitype of the proclamation of the Ten Commandments or Mosaic Covenant by Moses from Mount Sinai.

=== Offering of Isaac ===
Genesis Chapter 22 brings us the story of the preempted offering of Isaac. God asks Abraham to offer his son Isaac to Him, cited as foreshadowing the crucifixion of Jesus. Isaac asks his father, "Where is the lamb for the burnt offering", and Abraham prophesies, "God himself will provide the lamb for the burnt offering, my son." And indeed, a ram caught by its horns awaits them, which is also seen as a type for Christ, the lamb that God provides for sacrifice, crowned by thorns.

=== Joseph ===
Genesis Chapters 37–50 have the story of Joseph in Egypt, and Joseph is commonly cited as a Christ type. Joseph is a very special son to his father. From his father's perspective, Joseph dies and then comes back to life as the ruler of Egypt. Joseph's brothers deceive their father by dipping his coat in the blood of a sacrificed goat (Genesis 37:31). Later, Joseph's father finds that Joseph is alive and is the ruler of Egypt who saves the world from a great famine. Other parallels between Joseph and Jesus include:

- Both are rejected by their own people.
- Both became servants.
- Both were betrayed for silver.
- Both were falsely accused and face false witnesses.
- Both attained stations at the "right hand" of the respective thrones (Joseph at Pharaoh's throne and Christ at the throne of God).
- Joseph was 30 years old when he stood before Pharaoh, and Jesus was about the same age, according to the Bible, when he began his ministry.
- Money and goods could not save the people in time of famine; they had to sell themselves. The same notions are discussed throughout the New Testament.
- Both provided for the salvation of gentiles. (Joseph provided a physical salvation in preparing for the famine, while Christ provided the deeper spiritual salvation.)
- Joseph married an Egyptian wife, bringing her into the Abrahamic lineage; Christ's relationship with the church is also described in marriage terms in the New Testament.
- A direct parallel with Joseph ruling over all of Egypt, and that only Pharaoh would be greater in the throne (Genesis 41:40) is repeated in 1 Corinthians 15:27 with regards to Jesus.
- Both suffered greatly, and through patience and humbleness were exalted greatly by God, who gave in abundance all things over time.

=== Moses ===
Moses, like Joseph and Jonah, undergoes a symbolic death and resurrection. Moses is placed in a basket and floated down the Nile river, and then is drawn out of the Nile to be adopted as a prince (floating the body down the Nile river was also part of an Egyptian funerary ritual for royalty).

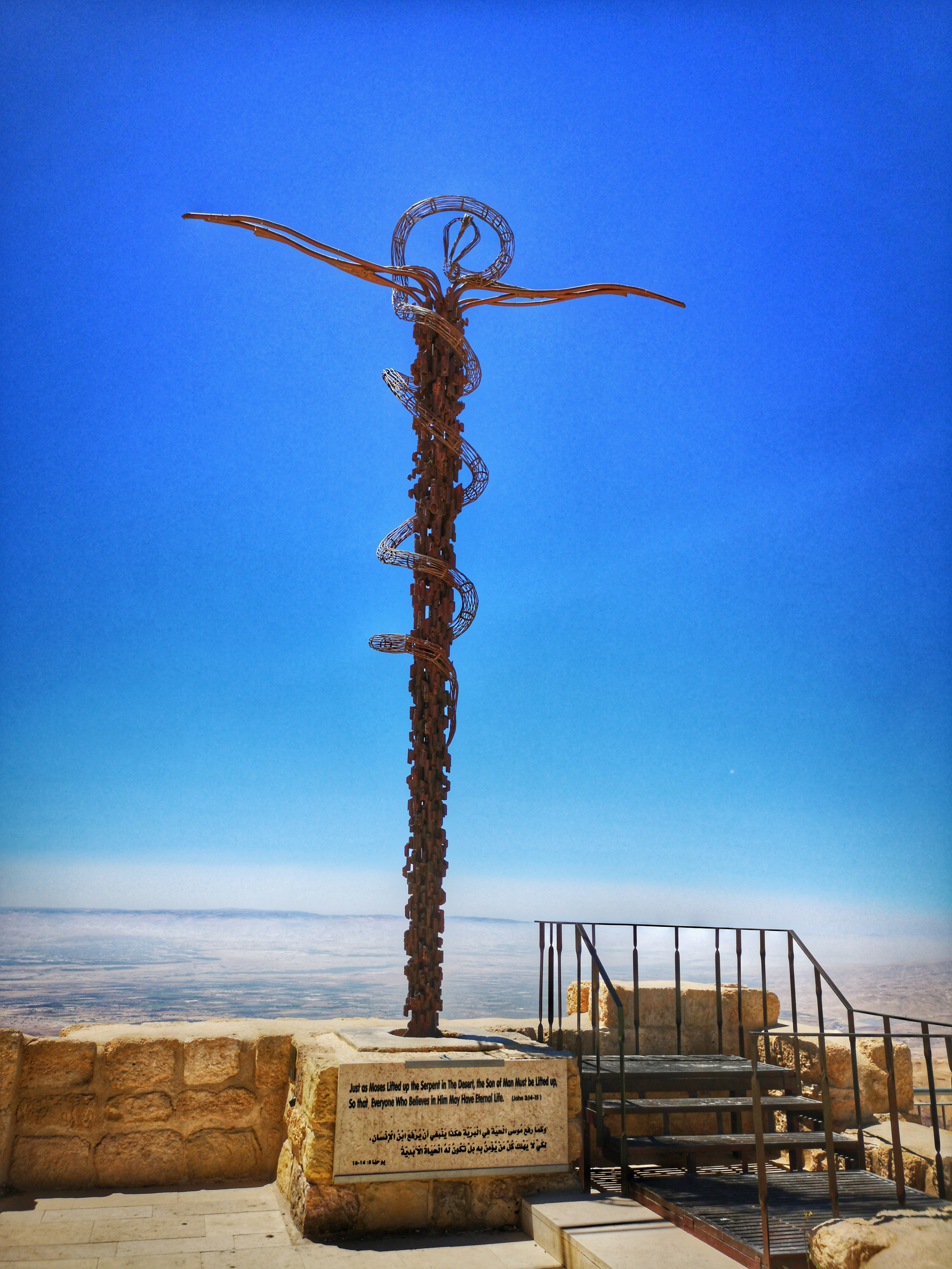
The Brazen Serpent monument by Giovanni Fantoni is located at Mount Nebo. Its shape also references a crucifix.

While in the wilderness, Moses put a brazen serpent on a pole which would heal anyone bitten by a snake, provided that the person looked at it (Numbers 21:8). Jesus proclaimed that the serpent was a type of Himself: "as Moses lifted up the serpent in the wilderness, even so must the Son of man be lifted up" (John 3:14).

In the battle with the Amalekites at Rephidim, Exodus 17:11 states that "as long as Moses held up his hands, the Israelites were winning, but whenever he lowered his hands, the Amalekites were winning." Commentators interpret Moses' raised hands as a type of Jesus' raised hands upon the Cross for, when Jesus' hands were raised as He died, a figurative battle was waged with sin, the result being victory – that "all will be made alive" (1 Cor. 15:22).

=== Inanimate types ===
Other types were found in aspects of the Old Testament less tied to specific events. The Jewish holidays also have typological fulfillment in the life of Christ. The Last Supper was a Passover meal. Furthermore, many people see the Spring Feasts as types of what Christ accomplished in his first advent and the Fall Feasts as types of what Christ will accomplish in his second advent.

The Jewish Tabernacle is commonly seen as a series of complex types of Jesus Christ. For example, Jesus describes himself as "the door" and the only "way" to God, represented in the single, wide gate to the tabernacle court; the various layers of coverings over the tabernacle represent Christ's godliness (in the intricately woven inner covering) and his humanity (in the dull colouring of the outside covering). The Showbread prepared in the Temple of Jerusalem is also seen as a type for Christ.

== Post-biblical usage ==
As Erich Auerbach points out in his essay "Figura", typological (figural) interpretation co-existed alongside allegorical and symbolic-mythical forms of interpretation. But it was typology that was most influential as Christianity spread in late Mediterranean cultures, as well as in the North and Western European cultures. Auerbach notes that it was the predominant method of understanding the Hebrew scriptures until after the Reformation—that is, that the Hebrew texts were not understood as Jewish history and law but were instead interpreted "as figura rerum or phenomenal prophecy, as a prefiguration of Christ". Typological interpretation was a key element of Medieval realism, but remained important in Europe "up to the eighteenth century".

Further, typology was extended beyond interpretations of the Hebrew scriptures and applied to post-biblical events, seeing them as "not the ultimate fulfillment, but [...] a promise of the end of time and the true kingdom of God." Thus, the Puritans interpreted their own history typologically:

Applied more liberally and figured more broadly, typology expanded into a more elaborate verbal system that enabled an interpreter to discover biblical forecasts of current events. Thus, the Atlantic journey of the Puritans could be an antitype of the Exodus of the Israelites; and the New England colony, a New Zion, to which Christ may return to usher in the Millennium. The first settlers were conservative, cautious typologists, but as Edward Johnson's Wonder-Working Providence of Sion's Saviour in New England (1654; composed c. 1650) demonstrates, by the 1640s New England's sacred errand into the wilderness and the approaching Apocalypse were accepted antitypes of sacred history.

In this way, the Puritans applied typology both to themselves as a group and to the progress of the individual souls:

Applied more broadly, typology enabled Puritans to read biblical types as forecasting not just the events of the New Testament but also their own historical situation and experiences. In this way, individual Puritans could make sense of their own spiritual struggles and achievements by identifying with biblical personages like Adam, Noah, or Job. But this broad understanding of typology was not restricted to individual typing; the Puritans also interpreted their group identity as the fulfillment of Old Testament prophecy, identifying their community as the "New Israel."

Typology also became important as a literary device, in which both historical and literary characters become prefigurations of later historical or literary characters.

== Intrinsic vs. extrinsic typology ==
Exegetical professor George Stoeckhardt (1842–1913) separated biblical typology into two categories. He distinguished extrinsic or external typology as separate from the meaning of the text and its original meaning – rather, it is applied to the topic by the reader. Stöckhardt saw intrinsic or internal typology as embedded within the meaning of the text itself. Although he rejected the possibility of intrinsic typology because it would violate the doctrine of the clarity of scripture, most typologists either do not make this distinction or do not reject typology internal to the text. Stöckhardt's opposition to intrinsic typology is connected to the view that all prophecies foretelling the Messiah are rectilinear as opposed to typological.

== Typology and narrative criticism ==
Typology is also used by narrative critics to describe the type of time in which an event or happening takes place. Mark Allan Powell separates chronological time from typological time. Whereas chronological time refers to the time of action, typological time refers to the "kind of time" of an action. Typological settings may be symbolic.

== See also ==
- Anagoge
- Correspondence (theology) – typology of Emanuel Swedenborg.
- Foreshadowing
- Peter Leithart – typologist
- Parallelomania, concerning the overuse of typology
- Supersessionism
- Tropological reading
