= Gymnobiblism =

Belief on the interpretation of the Bible

Gymnobiblism (gymno + biblism; /ˌdʒɪmnoʊˈbɪblɪzəm/) is the opinion that the bare text of the Bible, without commentary, may be safely given to the unlearned as a sufficient guide to religious truth.

== Martin Luther ==
Gymnobiblism was the guiding principle for Martin Luther's translation of the New Testament into the German vernacular but his proposition was condemned by the Catholic Church at the Council of Trent, which held that the Sacred Scriptures may not be isolated from Sacred Tradition, the teaching of the ordinary Magisterium of the bishops of the Church, nor isolated from the teachings of the Pope nor ecumenical councils.

== Historical Papal views ==
Pope Gregory XVI (in office: 1831-1846) opposed gymnobiblism and established policies that were critical of biblical societies. His successor Pius IX (in office: 1846-1878) also privileged the use of the 4th-century Latin Vulgata and banned vernacular versions of the scriptures. These policies were largely maintained by Popes Leo XIII (in office: 1878-1903), Pius X (in office: 1903-1914) and Pius XII (in office: 1939-1958), who required a proper catechism before catechumens could make a proper use of the Bible.

== Second Vatican Council ==
The Catholic Church's stance on gymnobiblism has somewhat softened since the Second Vatican Council. Nevertheless, the Church's rule of faith, as expressed in the conciliar constitution Dei verbum, maintains that Scripture must be taught in accordance with the teaching norms of the sacred Magisterium. Catholic doctrine holds that religious truth is found within the Church and not necessarily through the independent reading of holy books.

== See also ==
- Clarity of scripture
