= Tropological reading =

Moral interpretation of the Bible

Tropological reading or "moral sense" is a Christian tradition, theory, and practice of interpreting the figurative meaning of the Bible. It is part of biblical exegesis and one of the Four senses of Scripture.

== Doctrine ==
The Christian Four Senses of Scripture are literal, allegorical/typological, tropological and anagogical. According to doctrine developed by the Church Fathers, the literal sense, or God-intended meaning of the words of the Bible, may also have a tropological sense: it is read figuratively as a moral reading for one's personal life. For instance, in the Song of Songs (also called Canticles or Song of Solomon), which contains love songs between a woman and a man, the text can also symbolize the love between God and a believer.

In the conception of the Church Fathers, the definitions of "allegory" and "tropology" were very close, until Middle Ages where the Church made a clearer distinction between allegorical spiritual meaning, tropological moral meaning and styles of interpretation.

== Etymology ==
The Ancient Greek word τρόπος (tropos) meant 'turn, way, manner, style'. The term τροπολογία (tropologia) was coined from this word around the second century AD, in Hellenistic Greek, to mean 'allegorical interpretation of scripture' (and also, by the fourth century, 'figurative language' more generally).

The Greek word τρόπος had already been borrowed into Classical Latin as tropus, meaning 'figure of speech', and the Latinised form of τροπολογία, tropologia, is found already in the fourth-century writing of Jerome in the sense 'figurative language', and by the fifth century in sense 'moral interpretation'. This Latin term was adopted in medieval French as tropologie, and English developed the form tropology in the fifteenth century through the simultaneous influence of French and Latin.

== See also ==
- Allegorical interpretation of the Bible
- Anagoge
- Biblical hermeneutics
- Historical-grammatical method
- Trope (linguistics)
