= Clarity of scripture =

Protestant Christian doctrine

The doctrine of the clarity of Scripture (often called the perspicuity of Scripture) is a Protestant Christian position teaching that "...those things which are necessary to be known, believed, and observed, for salvation, are so clearly propounded and opened in some place of Scripture or other, that not only the learned, but the unlearned, in a due use of the ordinary means, may attain unto a sufficient understanding of them". Clarity of scripture is an important doctrinal and Biblical interpretive principle for historical Protestants and, today, for many evangelical Christians; it is adhered to by the Lutheran, Reformed, Anglican and Methodist churches. Perspicuity of scripture does not imply that people will receive it for what it is, as many adherents to the doctrine of perspicuity of scripture accept the Calvinist teaching that man is depraved and needs the illumination of the Holy Spirit in order to see the meaning for what it is. Martin Luther advocated the clearness of scripture in his work On the Bondage of the Will. Arminius argued for the perspicuity of scripture by name in "The Perspicuity of the Scriptures".

While both traditions affirm the accessibility of the gospel, Lutheran and Reformed theologians have historically diverged in their systematic definitions of perspicuity. Lutheran scholasticism tended to assert an objective, external clarity inherent to the biblical text across all articles of faith, whereas Reformed dogmatics—articulated by theologians such as John Calvin and later codified in the Westminster Confession of Faith—carefully distinguished between the universal clarity of doctrines essential for salvation and the inherent obscurity of deeper theological passages. In the Reformed view, understanding these complex texts requires the diligent use of ordinary means, such as linguistic study and ecclesiastical context, alongside the internal illumination of the Holy Spirit.

== Lutheranism ==
Lutherans hold that the Bible presents all doctrines and commands of the Christian faith clearly. God's Word is freely accessible to every reader or hearer of ordinary intelligence, without requiring any special education. Of course, one must understand the language God's Word is presented in, and not be so preoccupied by contrary thoughts so as to prevent understanding. As a result of this, no one needs to wait for any clergy, and pope, scholar, or ecumenical council to explain the real meaning of any part of the Bible.

For Martin Luther, this clarity (on issues of law, faith and grace) was a logical necessity not an observation, something asserted as fact but not in this world falsifiable: "Holy Scripture must necessarily be clearer, simpler, and more reliable than any other writings."

Martin Luther attributed the difficulty in understanding Scripture to man's blindness and fallen state, "But, if many things still remain abstruse to many, this does not arise from obscurity in the Scriptures, but from [our] own blindness or want [i.e. lack] of understanding, who do not go the way to see the all-perfect clearness of the truth... Let, therefore, wretched men cease to impute, with blasphemous perverseness, the darkness and obscurity of their own heart to the all-clear scriptures of God."

== Reformed Christianity ==
In Reformed theology, the clarity of Scripture is inextricably linked to the sufficiency and work of the Holy Spirit. The Westminster Confession of Faith (1646), the foundational doctrinal standard of Presbyterianism, explicitly acknowledges that not all portions of Scripture are equally transparent, while affirming that everything necessary for salvation is plainly revealed:

All things in Scripture are not alike plain in themselves, nor alike clear unto all: yet those things which are necessary to be known, believed, and observed for salvation, are so clearly propounded, and opened in some place of Scripture or other, that not only the learned, but the unlearned, in a due use of the ordinary means, may attain unto a sufficient understanding of them.

Reformed theologians emphasize that perspicuity does not render scholarly study, ministerial teaching, or historical creedal consensus obsolete. Rather, perspicuity operates through what the Confession terms "the ordinary means"—the rigorous study of the original languages (Hebrew and Greek), grammatical-historical exegesis, and the interpretive rule that Scripture must interpret Scripture (analogia scripturae). Theologians such as Herman Bavinck and Charles Hodge clarified that clarity is not synonymous with simplistic comprehension; instead, while the external text is grammatically accessible, fallen human faculties suffer from spiritual blindness, necessitating the inward illumination of the Holy Spirit for saving reception.

== Anglicanism and Methodism ==
Article VI — Of the Sufficiency of the Holy Scriptures for Salvation in Anglicanism's 39 Articles and Article V — Of the Sufficiency of the Holy Scriptures for Salvation in Methodism's Articles of Religion teach that the "Holy Scripture containeth all things necessary to salvation; so that whatsoever is not read therein, nor may be proved thereby, is not to be required of any man that it should be believed as an article of faith, or be thought requisite or necessary to salvation."

Thomas Cranmer, the Archbishop of Canterbury who led the English Reformation, thus establishing Protestant theology within the Church of England taught:

Peradventure they will say unto me, "How and if we understand not the deep and profound mysteries of scripture?" Yet can it not be but that much fruit and holiness must come and grow unto thee by the reading. For it cannot be that thou shouldest be ignorant in all things alike. For the Holy Ghost hath so ordered and attempered the scriptures that in them as well publicans, fishers and shepherds may find their edification, as great doctors their erudition. For those books were not made to vain-glory like as were the writing of the Gentile philosophers and rhetoricians, to the intent the makers should be had in admiration for their high styles and obscure manner of writing, whereof nothing can be understand without a master or an expositor. But the apostles and prophets wrote their books so that their special intent and purpose might be understanded and perceived of every reader, which was nothing but the edification or amendment of the life of them that readeth or heareth it. Who is there that reading or hearing read in the gospel, "Blessed are they that been meek, blessed are they that been merciful, blessed are they that been of clean heart," and other like places, can perceive nothing except he have a master to teach him what it meaneth? Likewise the signs and miracles with all other histories of the doings of Christ or his apostles, who is there of so simple wit and capacity but he may not be able to perceive and understand them? These be but excuses and cloaks for the rain and coverings of their own idle slothfulness. "I cannot understand it." What marvel? How shouldest thou understand, if thou wilt not read nor look upon it? Take the books into thine hands; read the whole story; and that thou understandest, keep it well in memory. That thou understandest not, read it again and again. If thou can neither so come by it, counsel with some other that is better learned. Go to thy curate and preacher. Shew thyself to be desirous to know and learn. And I doubt not but God, seeing thy diligence and readiness (if no man else teach thee,) will himself vouchsafe with his Holy Spirit to illuminate thee, and to open unto thee that which was locked from thee.

== Roman Catholic critique and Protestant responses ==
The doctrine of perspicuity has historically been a central point of contention between Protestantism and the Catholic Church. Following the Protestant Reformation, the fourth session of the Council of Trent (1546) rejected the premise that Scripture alone functions as a self-interpreting, standalone rule of faith, dogmatizing a "two-source" framework wherein divine revelation is contained in both written Scripture and unwritten apostolic traditions preserved by the Church. Catholic polemicists, notably Cardinal Robert Bellarmine in the sixteenth century and contemporary apologists, have argued that widespread doctrinal fragmentation, conflicting biblical interpretations, and the proliferation of Protestant denominations empirically falsify the claim that Scripture is perspicuous. From the Roman Catholic perspective, because sincere readers arrive at incompatible conclusions on foundational theological matters and Scripture does not explicitly define its own canon, Scripture is viewed as inherently obscure on key doctrines and requires an external, infallible teaching office (the Magisterium of the Catholic Church) to provide authentic and binding interpretation. Protestant theologians and biblical scholars respond by locating interpretative error within fallen human cognition rather than in divine revelation itself. Drawing on patristic thought—including Anselm of Canterbury's principle of "faith seeking understanding" (fides quaerens intellectum)—Protestant epistemology argues that human fallibility does not imply divine communicative deficiency. Protestant scholars note that throughout biblical history, ancient Israel frequently misunderstood, distorted, or rejected direct prophetic speech—even when delivered as immediate divine revelation—without that rebellion rendering God's speech inherently dark or deficient. Consequently, the reality that human readers disagree over Scripture reflects human fallenness and hermeneutical mishandling, not an insufficiency in God's ability to communicate His truth adequately in written form. Additionally, regarding the canonical dilemma often raised by Catholic apologists—that an infallible Church is necessary to identify and interpret an infallible canon—Reformed dogmatics distinguishes between ministerial recognition (judicium recognitionis) and constitutive authority (judicium constitutivum). Theologians such as Francis Turretin and Herman Bavinck maintained that the church did not create or confer authority upon the biblical books, but rather acknowledged their inherent divine authority (autopistia), functioning as a witness rather than an infallible arbiter. Furthermore, classical Protestantism distinguishes between Sola scriptura and radical private individualism (sometimes termed solo scriptura). In historical Protestant theology, the church and historic creeds hold a vital ministerial (subordinate and serving) authority, whereas Scripture alone possesses magisterial (supreme and norming) authority (norma normans non normata). In this framework, ecclesiastical tradition and councils possess a significant voice and consultative vote in the life of the church, but Scripture alone retains the ultimate veto over all human declarations.

== See also ==
- Authorial intent
- Gymnobiblism
- Hermeneutics
- Rectilinear prophecy
- Prima scriptura
- Sola scriptura
