= Allegorical interpretation of the Bible =

Allegorical interpretation of the Bible is an interpretive method (exegesis) that assumes that the Bible has various levels of meaning and tends to focus on the spiritual sense, which includes the allegorical sense, the moral (or tropological) sense, and the anagogical sense, as opposed to the literal sense. It is sometimes referred to as the quadriga, a reference to the Roman chariot that was drawn by four horses.

In the Middle Ages, allegorical interpretation was used by Bible commentators of Christianity.

== Antiquity ==
One of the earliest Christian theologians, the Pontian Marcion (c. 85 – c. 160) generally opposed allegorical interpretation.

Origen (c. 185 – c. 253), in his Treatise on First Principles, recommends interpreting the Old and New Testaments allegorically at three levels, the "flesh", the "soul", and the "spirit". He states that many of the events recounted in the Scriptures, if interpreted in the literal, or fleshly, sense, are impossible or nonsensical. They must be interpreted allegorically to be understood. Some passages have parts that are literally true and parts that are literally impossible. Then, "the reader must endeavor to grasp the entire meaning, connecting by an intellectual process the account of what is literally impossible with the parts that are not impossible but historically true, these being interpreted allegorically in common with the part which, so far as the letter goes, did not happen at all."

== Middle Ages ==
People of the Middle Ages shaped their ideas and institutions from drawing on the cultural legacies of the ancient world. They did not see the break between themselves and their predecessors that today's observers see; they saw continuity with themselves and the ancient world by using allegory to bring together the gaps. The use of allegorical interpretation in the Middle Ages began as a Christian method for studying the differences between the two Testaments (tropological interpretation). Christian scholars believed both Testaments were equally inspired divinely by God and sought to understand the differences between Old Testament and New Testament laws.

Medieval scholars believed the Old Testament to serve as an allegory of New Testament events, such as the story of Jonah and the whale, which represents Jesus' death and resurrection. According to the Old Testament Book of Jonah, a prophet spent three days in the belly of a fish. Medieval scholars believed this was an allegory (using the typological interpretation) of Jesus' death and his being in the tomb for three days before he rose from the dead.

Some argue that Jacob's wrestling with an angel in Hosea 12:4 references an allegorical interpretation.

== See also ==
- Aesthetic interpretation
- Allegorical interpretations of Plato
- Demythologization
- Esoteric interpretation of the Quran
- Four senses of Scripture
- Hermeneutics
- Parallelomania
- Pardes (exegesis)
- Typology (theology)
