= Waimate Creek =

- Route of the Waimate Creek
- Mouth of the Waimate Creek Waimate Creek (South Island)

Location
- Country: New Zealand

Physical characteristics
- Source: Waimate Forest
  - coordinates: 44°42′11″S 170°56′35″E
- Mouth
  - location: Wainono Dead Arm
  - coordinates: 44°44′17″S 171°09′59″E

Basin features
- Progression: Waimate Creek → Wainono Dead Arm → Pacific Ocean

Waimate Creek is a natural watercourse in the southern Canterbury region of New Zealand's South Island. Its original Māori name was Te Waimatemate, which means "slowly moving waters".

== Catchment ==
Waimate Creek runs roughly eastwards, rising in the Hunters Hills before reaching the narrow coastal plain of the Pacific Ocean, skirting the west and southern side of Waimate township and then discharging metres from the sea into the Wainono Dead Arm, which links the Waihao River and Wainono Lagoon. Its catchment area is approximately 78 square kilometres (30 mi^{2}).

== Ecology ==
Waimate Creek is considered by Environment Canterbury to be in good ecological condition. This is due to intact native forest at its headwaters and a riparian zone that has remained relatively intact. This zone contains vegetation such as willows and broom. Fish species found within the stream include the Canterbury galaxias, New Zealand longfin eel, and upland bully.

== Crossings ==
State Highway 82 crosses Waimate Creek on the southwestern side of Waimate. In Studholme, near its discharge into the Wainono Dead Arm, it is crossed by State Highway 1 and the Main South Line railway. It was formerly crossed by the Waimate Gorge Branch railway on the southwestern side of Waimate but this branch line closed in 1953 and the bridge has been removed.
