= Makikihi =

Makikihi Mākikihi
- Rural settlement
- Interactive map of Makikihi
- Coordinates: 44.631°S 171.142°E
- Country: New Zealand
- Region: Canterbury
- Territorial authority: Waimate District
- Ward: Pareora-Otaio-Makikihi Ward
- Electorates: Waitaki; Te Tai Tonga (Māori)

Government
  - Territorial authority: Waimate District Council
  - Regional council: Environment Canterbury
  - Mayor of Waimate: Craig Rowley
  - Waitaki MP: Miles Anderson
  - Te Tai Tonga MP: Mananui Ramsden

Area
  - Total: 0.33 km^{2} (0.13 sq mi)

Population (June 2025)
  - Total: 90
  - Density: 270/km^{2} (710/sq mi)
- Time zone: UTC+12 (New Zealand Standard Time)
  - Summer (DST): UTC+13 (New Zealand Daylight Time)
- Area code: 03

Makikihi is a small town in the Waimate District of south Canterbury region of New Zealand's South Island. It is located on State Highway 1 12.2 kilometres south of Saint Andrews, Canterbury, and 15.5 kilometres northeast of Waimate. It is close to the mouth of Makikihi River.

== Demographics ==
Makikihi is described as a rural settlement by Statistics New Zealand, and covers 0.33 km^{2} (0.13 sq mi). It had an estimated population of 90 as of June 2025, with a population density of 273 people per km^{2}. The settlement is part of the larger Makikihi-Willowbridge statistical area.

Historical population for Makikihi
Year	Pop.	±% p.a.
2006	72	—
2013	72	+0.00%
2018	84	+3.13%
2023	90	+1.39%

Mākikihi had a population of 90 in the 2023 New Zealand census, an increase of 6 people (7.1%) since the 2018 census, and an increase of 18 people (25.0%) since the 2013 census. There were 51 males and 36 females in 42 dwellings. 3.3% of people identified as LGBTIQ+. The median age was 52.5 years (compared with 38.1 years nationally). There were 12 people (13.3%) aged under 15 years, 12 (13.3%) aged 15 to 29, 45 (50.0%) aged 30 to 64, and 21 (23.3%) aged 65 or older.

People could identify as more than one ethnicity. The results were 90.0% European (Pākehā), 13.3% Māori, and 13.3% other, which includes people giving their ethnicity as "New Zealander". English was spoken by 96.7%, Māori by 6.7%, and other languages by 3.3%. No language could be spoken by 3.3% (e.g. too young to talk). The percentage of people born overseas was 13.3, compared with 28.8% nationally.

The sole religious affiliation given was 16.7% Christian. People who answered that they had no religion were 60.0%, and 20.0% of people did not answer the census question.

Of those at least 15 years old, 3 (3.8%) people had a bachelor's or higher degree, 48 (61.5%) had a post-high school certificate or diploma, and 27 (34.6%) people exclusively held high school qualifications. The median income was $40,400, compared with $41,500 nationally. 9 people (11.5%) earned over $100,000 compared to 12.1% nationally. The employment status of those at least 15 was 45 (57.7%) full-time and 6 (7.7%) part-time.

=== Makikihi-Willowbridge statistical area ===
The Makikihi-Willowbridge statistical area includes Hook and Studholme, and extends to Waimate but does not include it. It covers 295.03 km^{2} (113.91 sq mi) and had an estimated population of 1,110 as of June 2025, with a population density of 3.8 people per km^{2}.

Historical population for Makikihi-Willowbridge
Year	Pop.	±% p.a.
2006	984	—
2013	993	+0.13%
2018	1,008	+0.30%
2023	1,047	+0.76%

Mākikihi-Willowbridge had a population of 1,047 in the 2023 New Zealand census, an increase of 39 people (3.9%) since the 2018 census, and an increase of 54 people (5.4%) since the 2013 census. There were 549 males, 495 females, and 3 people of other genders in 423 dwellings. 2.3% of people identified as LGBTIQ+. The median age was 46.5 years (compared with 38.1 years nationally). There were 183 people (17.5%) aged under 15 years, 144 (13.8%) aged 15 to 29, 534 (51.0%) aged 30 to 64, and 186 (17.8%) aged 65 or older.

People could identify as more than one ethnicity. The results were 88.0% European (Pākehā), 7.4% Māori, 2.3% Pasifika, 6.3% Asian, and 5.2% other, which includes people giving their ethnicity as "New Zealander". English was spoken by 98.3%, Māori by 2.0%, Samoan by 0.6%, and other languages by 4.3%. No language could be spoken by 1.1% (e.g. too young to talk). New Zealand Sign Language was known by 0.6%. The percentage of people born overseas was 16.6, compared with 28.8% nationally.

Religious affiliations were 31.2% Christian, 0.3% Hindu, 0.3% Islam, 0.9% Buddhist, 0.6% New Age, and 0.6% other religions. People who answered that they had no religion were 55.9%, and 10.3% of people did not answer the census question.

Of those at least 15 years old, 135 (15.6%) people had a bachelor's or higher degree, 507 (58.7%) had a post-high school certificate or diploma, and 219 (25.3%) people exclusively held high school qualifications. The median income was $41,100, compared with $41,500 nationally. 90 people (10.4%) earned over $100,000 compared to 12.1% nationally. The employment status of those at least 15 was 501 (58.0%) full-time, 144 (16.7%) part-time, and 18 (2.1%) unemployed.

== Education ==
Makikihi School is a full primary school serving years 1 to 8, with a roll of 44 students as of July 2026. The school opened in 1881.
