= Waimate District =

- Territorial authority district
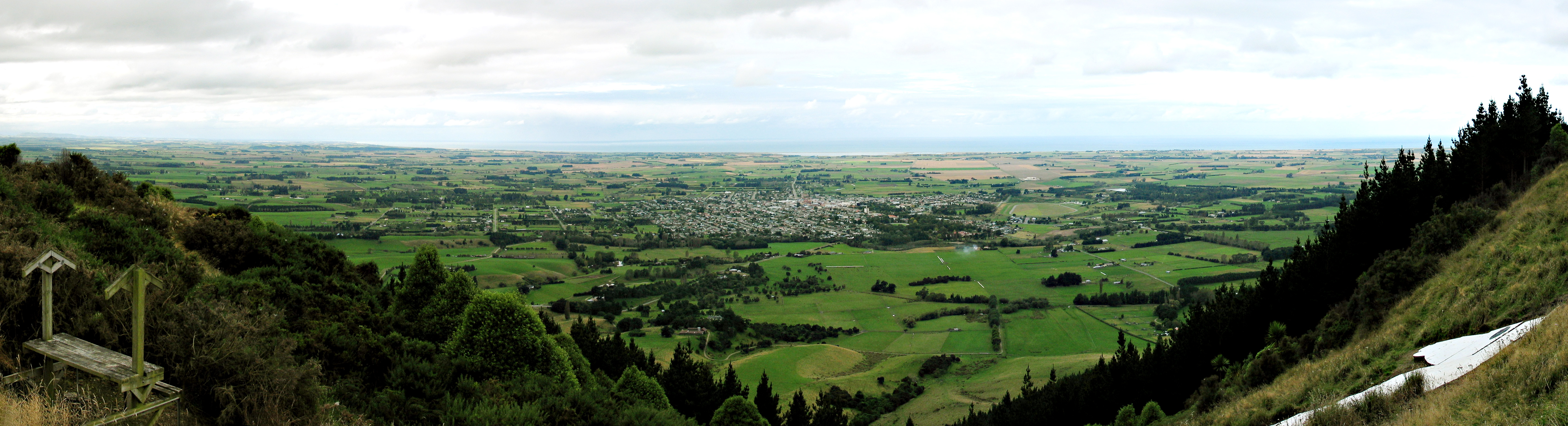

- Waimate district in the South Island
- Coordinates: 44°35′42″S 170°44′42″E
- Country: New Zealand
- Region: Canterbury Region
- Wards: Hakataramea-Waihaorunga; Lower Waihao; Pareora-Otaio-Makikihi; Waimate

Government
  - Mayor: Craig Rowley
  - Territorial authority: Waimate District Council

Area
  - Total: 3,582.19 km^{2} (1,383.09 sq mi)
  - Land: 3,554.45 km^{2} (1,372.38 sq mi)

Population (June 2025)
  - Total: 8,450
  - Density: 2.38/km^{2} (6.16/sq mi)
- Time zone: UTC+12 (NZST)
  - Summer (DST): UTC+13 (NZDT)
- Postcode(s): Map of postcodes
- Postcode(s): 7924, 7972, 7971, 7977, 7978, 7979, 7980, 7984, 7988, 7999, 9498
- Area code: 03
- Website: www.waimatedc.govt.nz

Waimate District is a territorial authority district located in the Canterbury Region of the South Island of New Zealand. The main town is Waimate, while there are many smaller rural communities dispersed throughout the area. Its boundary to the south is the Waitaki River, to the west Lake Benmore and to the north-east the Pareora River.

The district is administered by the Waimate District Council and regionally by the Canterbury Regional Council. John Coles, who was first elected as a councillor in 1994, was mayor from 2004 to his retirement at the 2013 local elections.

The district is the only part of New Zealand where Bennett's wallabies are prolific, after their introduction from Australia in the 19th century. The animals are a mixed blessing locally, attracting tourists but being a farm pest, and culling measures have been taken in their slowly expanding territory.

== Demographics ==
Waimate District covers 3,554.45 km^{2} (1,372.38 sq mi) and had an estimated population of 8,450 as of June 2025, with a population density of 2.4 people per km^{2}.

Historical population
Year	Pop.	±% p.a.
2006	7,209	—
2013	7,536	+0.64%
2018	7,815	+0.73%
2023	8,121	+0.77%

Waimate District had a population of 8,121 in the 2023 New Zealand census, an increase of 306 people (3.9%) since the 2018 census, and an increase of 585 people (7.8%) since the 2013 census. There were 4,107 males, 3,990 females and 21 people of other genders in 3,483 dwellings. 2.0% of people identified as LGBTIQ+. The median age was 47.1 years (compared with 38.1 years nationally). There were 1,374 people (16.9%) aged under 15 years, 1,131 (13.9%) aged 15 to 29, 3,663 (45.1%) aged 30 to 64, and 1,953 (24.0%) aged 65 or older.

People could identify as more than one ethnicity. The results were 88.4% European (Pākehā); 8.7% Māori; 1.5% Pasifika; 6.5% Asian; 0.9% Middle Eastern, Latin American and African New Zealanders (MELAA); and 3.5% other, which includes people giving their ethnicity as "New Zealander". English was spoken by 97.8%, Māori language by 1.6%, Samoan by 0.1% and other languages by 6.9%. No language could be spoken by 1.5% (e.g. too young to talk). New Zealand Sign Language was known by 0.4%. The percentage of people born overseas was 17.1, compared with 28.8% nationally.

Religious affiliations were 33.5% Christian, 0.8% Hindu, 0.3% Islam, 0.2% Māori religious beliefs, 0.4% Buddhist, 0.5% New Age, and 0.8% other religions. People who answered that they had no religion were 54.1%, and 9.3% of people did not answer the census question.

Of those at least 15 years old, 714 (10.6%) people had a bachelor's or higher degree, 3,780 (56.0%) had a post-high school certificate or diploma, and 2,064 (30.6%) people exclusively held high school qualifications. The median income was $34,200, compared with $41,500 nationally. 426 people (6.3%) earned over $100,000 compared to 12.1% nationally. The employment status of those at least 15 was that 3,273 (48.5%) people were employed full-time, 891 (13.2%) were part-time, and 111 (1.6%) were unemployed.

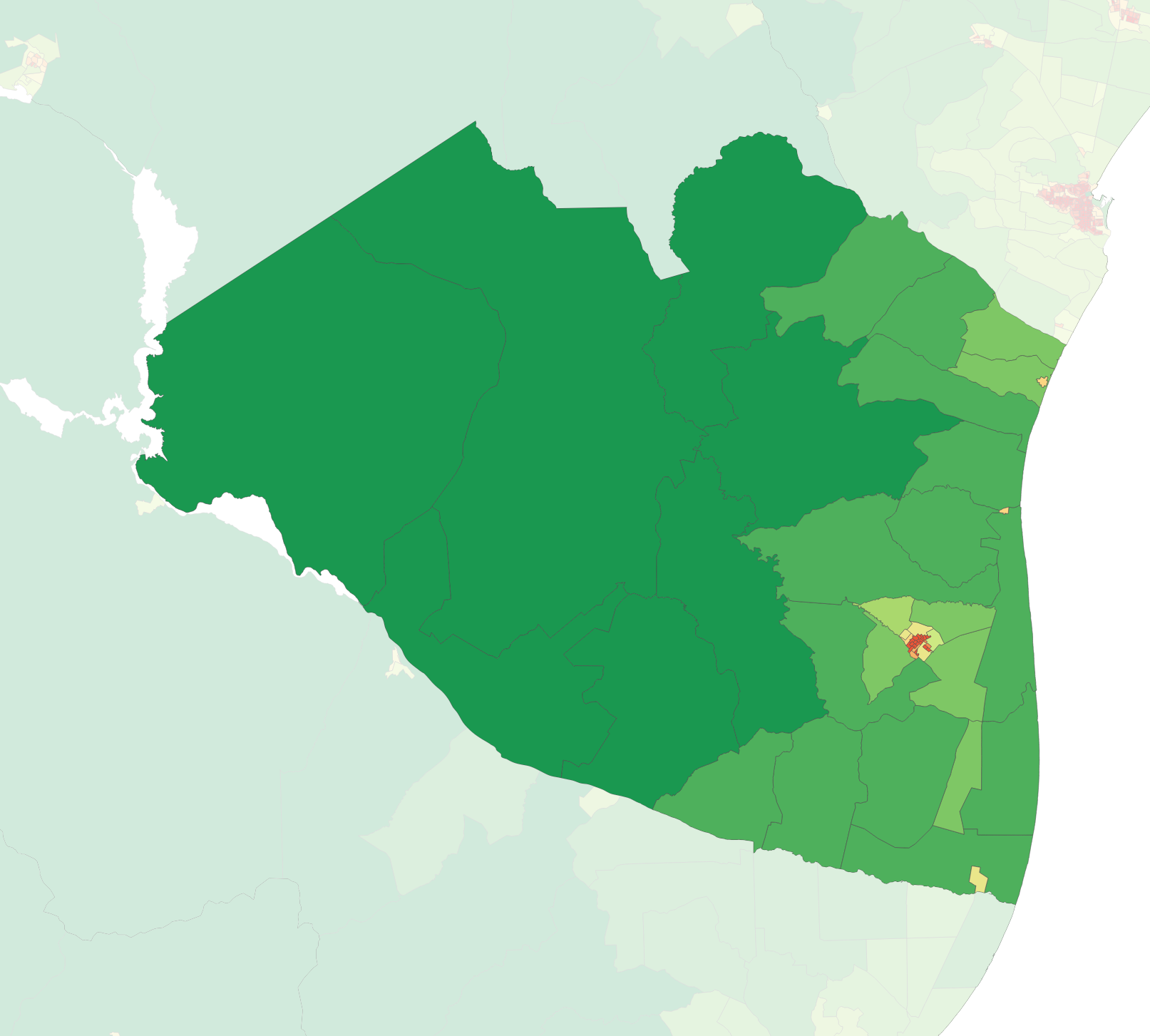
Population density in the 2023 census

Individual wards
Name	Area (km^{2})	Population	Density (per km^{2})	Dwellings	Median age	Median income
Hakataramea-Waihaorunga	2,172.40	933	0.43	369	37.8 years	$41,300
Pareora-Otaio-Makikihi	1,002.84	1,857	1.85	720	42.8 years	$46,000
Lower Waihao	281.57	1,119	3.97	459	36.0 years	$43,900
Waimate	97.63	4,209	43.11	1,935	55.0 years	$28,600
New Zealand					38.1 years	$41,500

== Administrative divisions ==
Waimate, the district seat, is the only town in the district with a population over 1,000. It is home to 3,610 people, 42.7% of the district's population.

Other settlements and localities in the district include the following:

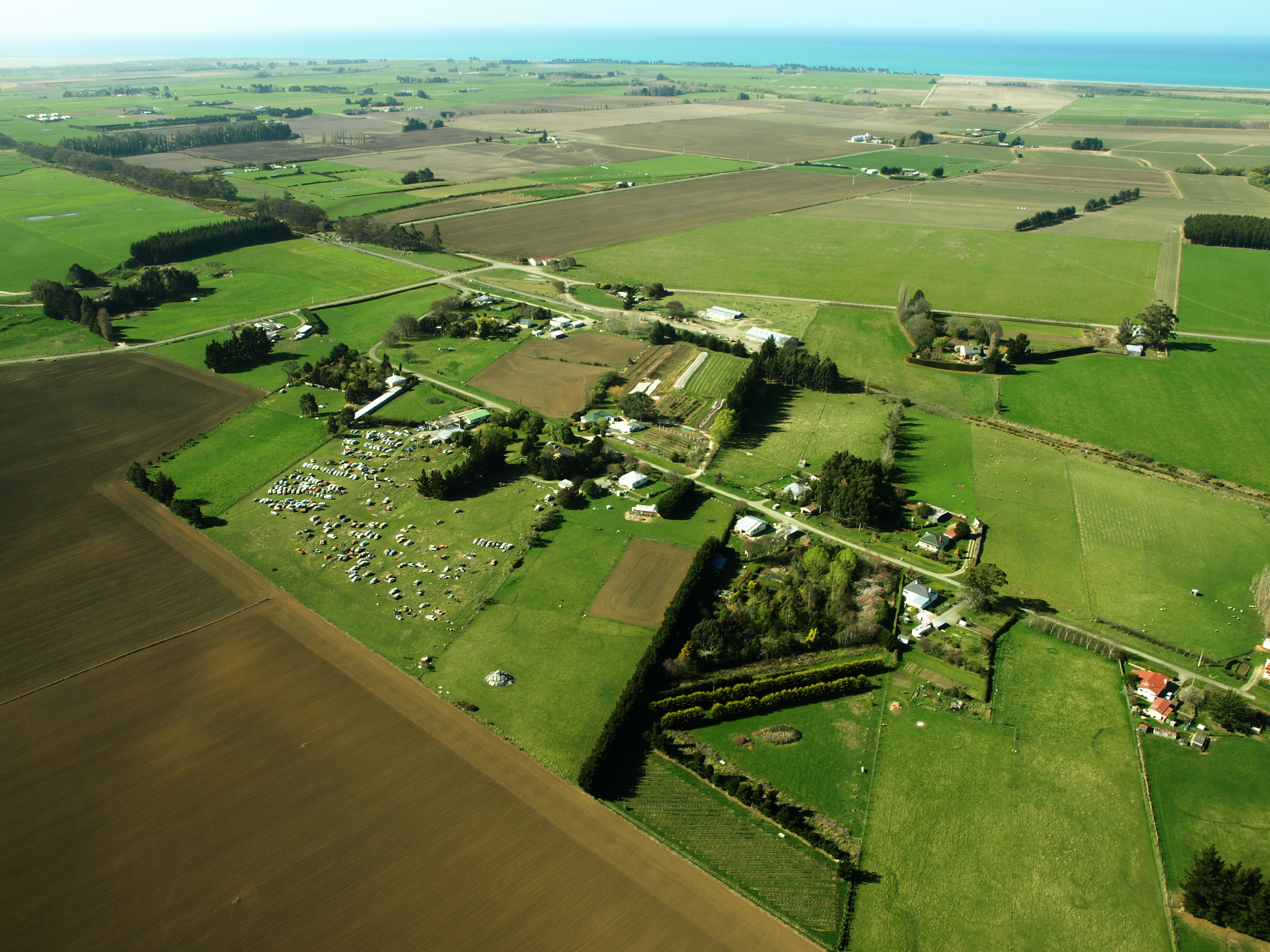
Willowbridge, SE of Waimate

- Hakataramea-Waihaorunga Ward:
  - Hakataramea Sub-Division:
    - Cattle Creek
    - **Hakataramea**
    - Hakataramea Downs
    - Hakataramea Valley
    - Kinbrace
    - Maungatiro
    - Struan
    - Te Akatarawa
    - Waitangi
  - Waihaorunga Sub-Division:
    - Douglas (Note: Formerly a populated place within the defunct Waihao Ward.)
    - Elephant Hill
    - Ikawai
    - Kelceys Bush
    - Pentland Hills
    - Waihao Downs
    - Waihao Forks
    - **Waihaorunga**
    - Arno (Note: Formerly a populated place within the defunct Deep Creek Ward.)
    - Kapua
    - Kowhatu
- Lower Waihao Ward:
  - Broad Gully
  - Dog Kennel
  - **Glenavy**
  - Grays Corner
  - Green Hills
  - Gum Tree Flat
  - **Morven**
  - Nukuroa
  - Pikes Point
  - **Studholme**
  - Tawai
  - Waikakahi
  - **Willowbridge**
- Pareora-Otaio-Makikihi Ward:
  - Blue Cliffs
  - Esk Valley
  - Gordons Valley
  - Gunns Bush
  - Hook
  - Hook Bush
  - Hunter
  - Kohika
  - Lyalldale
  - **Makikihi**
  - Maungati
  - Otaio Gorge
  - Otaio
  - **Saint Andrews**
  - Southburn
  - Springbrook
  - Waiariari
  - Cup and Saucer Junction
  - Riverview
- Waimate Ward:
  - Deep Creek
  - Maytown
  - Norton Reserve
  - Uretane
  - **Waimate**
  - Waituna
  - Te Waimate

Notes

Legend

- **bold** - main town
- **bold & italics** - minor town
- normal text - locality
- italics - minor locality
