= Hakataramea =

Town in Canterbury, New Zealand

- Rural locality
- Interactive map of Hakataramea
- Coordinates: 44.689°S 170.518°E
- Country: New Zealand
- Region: Canterbury
- Territorial authority: Waimate District
- Ward: Hakataramea-Waihaorunga Ward
- Electorates: Waitaki; Te Tai Tonga (Māori)

Government
  - Territorial authority: Waimate District Council
  - Regional council: Environment Canterbury
  - Mayor of Waimate: Craig Rowley
  - Waitaki MP: Miles Anderson
  - Te Tai Tonga MP: Mananui Ramsden

Area
  - Total: 2,059.60 km^{2} (795.22 sq mi)

Population (June 2025)
  - Total: 900
  - Density: 0.44/km^{2} (1.1/sq mi)
- Time zone: UTC+12 (New Zealand Standard Time)
  - Summer (DST): UTC+13 (New Zealand Daylight Time)
- Area code: 03

Hakataramea, spelt Hakateramea in some older sources, is a rural village located in the southern Canterbury region of New Zealand's South Island. It is in the Waimate District and sits on the north bank of the Waitaki River at its confluence with the Hakataramea River.

Several small communities are located in the Waihaorunga rural area, to the north of Hakataramea. The community of Douglas, settled in 1911, has a population of about 20 people. Waihao Downs, on State Highway 82, was the terminus on Waimate Rail Branch, from 4 April 1884 until 11 December 1953.

== History ==
The area in and around Hakataramea was leased by the New Zealand and Australia Land Company in the 1860s and freehold settlement began in 1878. On 7 November 1881, a combined road/rail bridge from Kurow to Hakataramea across the Waitaki River was opened. The bridge carried the Kurow Branch railway into Hakataramea, and this branch line provided an economically valuable connection to the Main South Line, from which it diverged in Pukeuri, north of Oamaru. Plans existed to extend the line beyond Hakataramea up the Hakataramea River valley to a proposed town that would have been home to 10,000 people, but neither town nor railway extension were ever built. Railway services consisted of mixed trains hauled by steam locomotives. Due to low traffic and the closeness of the more significant Kurow railway station, the 1.76 km of trackage between Kurow and Hakataramea closed on 14 July 1930. The road/rail bridge into Hakataramea is now road only and carries State Highway 82.

In World War I, eight soldiers from Hakataramea were killed. A small square obelisk now stands in Hakataramea as a memorial.

== Demographics ==
The Hakataramea statistical area covers 2,059.60 km^{2} (795.22 sq mi) and had an estimated population of 900 as of June 2025, with a population density of 0.44 people per km^{2}.

Historical population
| Year | Pop. | ±% p.a. |
|---|---|---|
| 2006 | 732 | — |
| 2013 | 756 | +0.46% |
| 2018 | 831 | +1.91% |
| 2023 | 870 | +0.92% |

Hakataramea had a population of 870 in the 2023 New Zealand census, an increase of 39 people (4.7%) since the 2018 census, and an increase of 114 people (15.1%) since the 2013 census. There were 441 males and 429 females in 354 dwellings. 0.7% of people identified as LGBTIQ+. The median age was 41.5 years (compared with 38.1 years nationally). There were 177 people (20.3%) aged under 15 years, 129 (14.8%) aged 15 to 29, 423 (48.6%) aged 30 to 64, and 144 (16.6%) aged 65 or older.

People could identify as more than one ethnicity. The results were 93.4% European (Pākehā); 5.5% Māori; 0.3% Pasifika; 3.8% Asian; 0.7% Middle Eastern, Latin American and African New Zealanders (MELAA); and 3.4% other, which includes people giving their ethnicity as "New Zealander". English was spoken by 99.3%, Māori by 1.0%, and other languages by 4.5%. No language could be spoken by 1.0% (e.g. too young to talk). New Zealand Sign Language was known by 0.7%. The percentage of people born overseas was 13.8, compared with 28.8% nationally.

Religious affiliations were 27.6% Christian, 0.3% Buddhist, and 0.7% other religions. People who answered that they had no religion were 62.1%, and 9.7% of people did not answer the census question.

Of those at least 15 years old, 96 (13.9%) people had a bachelor's or higher degree, 441 (63.6%) had a post-high school certificate or diploma, and 159 (22.9%) people exclusively held high school qualifications. The median income was $36,300, compared with $41,500 nationally. 45 people (6.5%) earned over $100,000 compared to 12.1% nationally. The employment status of those at least 15 was 423 (61.0%) full-time, 96 (13.9%) part-time, and 9 (1.3%) unemployed.

== Climate ==
Climate data for Hakataramea Valley, elevation 355 m (1,165 ft), (1991–2020)
| Month | Jan | Feb | Mar | Apr | May | Jun | Jul | Aug | Sep | Oct | Nov | Dec | Year |
|---|---|---|---|---|---|---|---|---|---|---|---|---|---|
| Mean daily maximum °C (°F) | 22.8 (73.0) | 22.8 (73.0) | 20.5 (68.9) | 17.0 (62.6) | 13.5 (56.3) | 9.7 (49.5) | 9.7 (49.5) | 11.6 (52.9) | 14.5 (58.1) | 16.7 (62.1) | 18.7 (65.7) | 21.0 (69.8) | 16.5 (61.8) |
| Daily mean °C (°F) | 16.2 (61.2) | 15.9 (60.6) | 13.9 (57.0) | 10.7 (51.3) | 7.7 (45.9) | 4.4 (39.9) | 4.3 (39.7) | 6.0 (42.8) | 8.5 (47.3) | 10.4 (50.7) | 12.3 (54.1) | 14.6 (58.3) | 10.4 (50.7) |
| Mean daily minimum °C (°F) | 9.5 (49.1) | 9.0 (48.2) | 7.3 (45.1) | 4.4 (39.9) | 2.0 (35.6) | −1.0 (30.2) | −1.1 (30.0) | 0.4 (32.7) | 2.6 (36.7) | 4.1 (39.4) | 6.0 (42.8) | 8.2 (46.8) | 4.3 (39.7) |
| Average rainfall mm (inches) | 75.9 (2.99) | 64.1 (2.52) | 50.8 (2.00) | 48.9 (1.93) | 52.6 (2.07) | 36.7 (1.44) | 49.2 (1.94) | 39.6 (1.56) | 45.5 (1.79) | 56.9 (2.24) | 62.0 (2.44) | 95.8 (3.77) | 678 (26.69) |
Source: NIWA
