= Maungati =

- Rural locality
- Interactive map of Maungati
- Coordinates: 44°27′S 170°56′E
- Country: New Zealand
- Region: Canterbury
- Territorial authority: Waimate District
- Ward: Pareora-Otaio-Makikihi Ward
- Electorates: Waitaki; Te Tai Tonga (Māori)

Government
  - Territorial authority: Waimate District Council
  - Regional council: Environment Canterbury
  - Mayor of Waimate: Craig Rowley
  - Waitaki MP: Miles Anderson
  - Te Tai Tonga MP: Mananui Ramsden

Area
  - Total: 89.32 km^{2} (34.49 sq mi)

Population (2023 census)
  - Total: 147
  - Density: 1.65/km^{2} (4.26/sq mi)
- Time zone: UTC+12 (New Zealand Standard Time)
  - Summer (DST): UTC+13 (New Zealand Daylight Time)
- Area code: 03

Maungati is a lightly populated locality situated approximately 18 miles southwest of Timaru in the Canterbury region of New Zealand's South Island. It is a small farming community in an area with primarily sheep and cattle farming and some deer farming, and it has a 9-hole golf course and Māori rock drawings.

Maungati comes from the Māori language words "maunga", meaning "mountain", and "tī", meaning "cabbage tree", and thus means "mountain of cabbage tree". There are many cabbage trees in the area.

== Demographics ==
Maungati locality covers 89.32 km^{2} (34.49 sq mi). It is part of the Maungati statistical area.

Historical population for Maungati locality
Year	Pop.	±% p.a.
2006	165	—
2013	153	−1.07%
2018	156	+0.39%
2023	147	−1.18%

Maungati had a population of 147 in the 2023 New Zealand census, a decrease of 9 people (−5.8%) since the 2018 census, and a decrease of 6 people (−3.9%) since the 2013 census. There were 75 males and 69 females in 63 dwellings. The median age was 49.7 years (compared with 38.1 years nationally). There were 18 people (12.2%) aged under 15 years, 27 (18.4%) aged 15 to 29, 72 (49.0%) aged 30 to 64, and 27 (18.4%) aged 65 or older.

People could identify as more than one ethnicity. The results were 95.9% European (Pākehā), 6.1% Māori, and 4.1% other, which includes people giving their ethnicity as "New Zealander". English was spoken by 98.0%, and other languages by 4.1%. The percentage of people born overseas was 14.3, compared with 28.8% nationally.

The sole religious affiliation given was 34.7% Christian. People who answered that they had no religion were 55.1%, and 8.2% of people did not answer the census question.

Of those at least 15 years old, 24 (18.6%) people had a bachelor's or higher degree, 84 (65.1%) had a post-high school certificate or diploma, and 27 (20.9%) people exclusively held high school qualifications. The median income was $49,100, compared with $41,500 nationally. 15 people (11.6%) earned over $100,000 compared to 12.1% nationally. The employment status of those at least 15 was 75 (58.1%) full-time, 15 (11.6%) part-time, and 3 (2.3%) unemployed.

=== Maungati statistical area ===
Maungati statistical area covers 695.95 km^{2} (268.71 sq mi) and had an estimated population of 780 as of June 2025, with a population density of 1.12 people per km^{2}.

Historical population for the statistical area
Year	Pop.	±% p.a.
2006	675	—
2013	732	+1.16%
2018	738	+0.16%
2023	723	−0.41%

Maungati statistical area had a population of 723 in the 2023 New Zealand census, a decrease of 15 people (−2.0%) since the 2018 census, and a decrease of 9 people (−1.2%) since the 2013 census. There were 390 males, 330 females, and 3 people of other genders in 285 dwellings. 2.1% of people identified as LGBTIQ+. The median age was 38.7 years (compared with 38.1 years nationally). There were 150 people (20.7%) aged under 15 years, 141 (19.5%) aged 15 to 29, 336 (46.5%) aged 30 to 64, and 102 (14.1%) aged 65 or older.

People could identify as more than one ethnicity. The results were 92.1% European (Pākehā); 7.1% Māori; 2.5% Pasifika; 3.7% Asian; 1.2% Middle Eastern, Latin American and African New Zealanders (MELAA); and 1.7% other, which includes people giving their ethnicity as "New Zealander". English was spoken by 97.5%, Māori by 1.2%, and other languages by 7.9%. No language could be spoken by 2.1% (e.g. too young to talk). New Zealand Sign Language was known by 0.4%. The percentage of people born overseas was 16.2, compared with 28.8% nationally.

Religious affiliations were 31.1% Christian, 0.8% Hindu, 0.4% Māori religious beliefs, 0.4% Buddhist, and 0.4% other religions. People who answered that they had no religion were 61.0%, and 5.8% of people did not answer the census question.

Of those at least 15 years old, 105 (18.3%) people had a bachelor's or higher degree, 345 (60.2%) had a post-high school certificate or diploma, and 123 (21.5%) people exclusively held high school qualifications. The median income was $53,100, compared with $41,500 nationally. 51 people (8.9%) earned over $100,000 compared to 12.1% nationally. The employment status of those at least 15 was 357 (62.3%) full-time, 87 (15.2%) part-time, and 6 (1.0%) unemployed.
