= Hook, New Zealand =

Hook
- Rural locality
- Interactive map of Hook
- Coordinates: 44°41′S 171°08′E
- Country: New Zealand
- Region: Canterbury
- Territorial authority: Waimate District
- Ward: Pareora-Otaio-Makikihi Ward

Government
  - Local authority: Waimate District Council
  - Regional council: Environment Canterbury
- Time zone: UTC+12 (New Zealand Standard Time)
  - Summer (DST): UTC+13 (New Zealand Daylight Time)
- Area code: 03

Hook is a lightly populated locality in the southern Canterbury region of New Zealand's South Island. It is situated on coastal plains by the Pacific Ocean and Wainono Lagoon. Hook River flows through Hook into the Wainono Lagoon. The nearest town is Waimate, approximately 8 km to the southwest, and other nearby localities include Makikihi to the north, Waiariari to the west, and Studholme to the south.

State Highway 82 diverges from State Highway 1 in Hook, and the Main South Line railway passes through the locality. The railway was opened on 1 February 1877 but Hook station is now closed.

== Demographics ==
Hook is part of the Makikihi-Willowbridge statistical area.
