= White Rock River =

Coordinates: 44°21′42″S 170°55′41″E

Location
- Country: New Zealand

Physical characteristics
- Source
  - location: Hunter Hills
  - elevation: 1,180 m (3,870 ft)
- Mouth
  - location: Pareora River
  - elevation: 170 m (560 ft)
- Length: 18 km (11 mi)

The White Rock River is a river in the South Canterbury area of New Zealand. It rises south of the 1,525 metres (5,003 ft) Mount Nimrod / Kaumira in the Hunter Hills and flows northeast then north to join the Pareora River.

The white rocks are a cliff face with many layers of rock which are millions of years old, often used for study by scientists and school students.
