= Glenavy, New Zealand =

Locality in Waimate District, Canterbury Region, New Zealand

Glenavy
- Rural settlement
- Interactive map of Glenavy
- Coordinates: 44°55′S 171°06′E
- Country: New Zealand
- Region: Canterbury
- Territorial authority: Waimate District
- Ward: Lower Waihao Ward
- Electorates: Waitaki; Te Tai Tonga (Māori)

Government
  - Territorial authority: Waimate District Council
  - Regional council: Environment Canterbury
  - Mayor of Waimate: Craig Rowley
  - Waitaki MP: Miles Anderson
  - Te Tai Tonga MP: Mananui Ramsden

Area
  - Total: 2.40 km^{2} (0.93 sq mi)

Population (June 2025)
  - Total: 270
  - Density: 110/km^{2} (290/sq mi)
- Time zone: UTC+12 (New Zealand Standard Time)
  - Summer (DST): UTC+13 (New Zealand Daylight Time)
- Area code: 03

Glenavy is a small town in the South Island of New Zealand. It is located at the southern extreme of the Canterbury region on the alluvial fan of the Waitaki River, three kilometres (1.9 mi) from the river's outflow into the Pacific Ocean.

Glenavy was named for Glenavy, Northern Ireland, the birthplace of former New Zealand Premier John Ballance.

== Demographics ==
Glenavy is described as a rural settlement by Statistics New Zealand, and covers 2.40 km^{2} (0.93 sq mi). It had an estimated population of 270 as of June 2025, with a population density of 113 people per km^{2}. The settlement is part of the larger Morven-Glenavy-Ikawai statistical area.

Historical population for Glenavy
Year	Pop.	±% p.a.
2006	129	—
2013	201	+6.54%
2018	195	−0.60%
2023	246	+4.76%

Glenavy had a population of 246 in the 2023 New Zealand census, an increase of 51 people (26.2%) since the 2018 census, and an increase of 45 people (22.4%) since the 2013 census. There were 141 males and 102 females in 123 dwellings. 3.7% of people identified as LGBTIQ+. The median age was 55.0 years (compared with 38.1 years nationally). There were 33 people (13.4%) aged under 15 years, 24 (9.8%) aged 15 to 29, 102 (41.5%) aged 30 to 64, and 81 (32.9%) aged 65 or older.

People could identify as more than one ethnicity. The results were 80.5% European (Pākehā), 12.2% Māori, 6.1% Pasifika, 9.8% Asian, and 4.9% other, which includes people giving their ethnicity as "New Zealander". English was spoken by 96.3%, Māori by 2.4%, and other languages by 9.8%. No language could be spoken by 2.4% (e.g. too young to talk). New Zealand Sign Language was known by 2.4%. The percentage of people born overseas was 15.9, compared with 28.8% nationally.

Religious affiliations were 37.8% Christian, and 2.4% Hindu. People who answered that they had no religion were 46.3%, and 13.4% of people did not answer the census question.

Of those at least 15 years old, 15 (7.0%) people had a bachelor's or higher degree, 123 (57.7%) had a post-high school certificate or diploma, and 72 (33.8%) people exclusively held high school qualifications. The median income was $27,700, compared with $41,500 nationally. 9 people (4.2%) earned over $100,000 compared to 12.1% nationally. The employment status of those at least 15 was 78 (36.6%) full-time, 24 (11.3%) part-time, and 3 (1.4%) unemployed.

=== Morven-Glenavy-Ikawai statistical area ===
The Morven-Glenavy-Ikawai statistical area covers 386.32 km^{2} (149.16 sq mi) and had an estimated population of 1,370 as of June 2025, with a population density of 3.5 people per km^{2}.

Historical population for Morven-Glenavy-Ikawai
Year	Pop.	±% p.a.
2006	939	—
2013	1,131	+2.69%
2018	1,095	−0.64%
2023	1,221	+2.20%

Morven-Glenavy-Ikawai had a population of 1,221 in the 2023 New Zealand census, an increase of 126 people (11.5%) since the 2018 census, and an increase of 90 people (8.0%) since the 2013 census. There were 657 males, 564 females, and 3 people of other genders in 489 dwellings. 2.5% of people identified as LGBTIQ+. The median age was 35.3 years (compared with 38.1 years nationally). There were 267 people (21.9%) aged under 15 years, 204 (16.7%) aged 15 to 29, 594 (48.6%) aged 30 to 64, and 153 (12.5%) aged 65 or older.

People could identify as more than one ethnicity. The results were 68.8% European (Pākehā); 10.6% Māori; 1.7% Pasifika; 24.3% Asian; 2.2% Middle Eastern, Latin American and African New Zealanders (MELAA); and 1.7% other, which includes people giving their ethnicity as "New Zealander". English was spoken by 95.3%, Māori by 1.0%, and other languages by 17.0%. No language could be spoken by 2.2% (e.g. too young to talk). New Zealand Sign Language was known by 0.5%. The percentage of people born overseas was 32.7, compared with 28.8% nationally.

Religious affiliations were 39.6% Christian, 3.7% Hindu, 1.0% Islam, 0.2% Māori religious beliefs, 1.2% Buddhist, 0.2% New Age, and 1.5% other religions. People who answered that they had no religion were 45.2%, and 7.4% of people did not answer the census question.

Of those at least 15 years old, 150 (15.7%) people had a bachelor's or higher degree, 504 (52.8%) had a post-high school certificate or diploma, and 291 (30.5%) people exclusively held high school qualifications. The median income was $46,300, compared with $41,500 nationally. 72 people (7.5%) earned over $100,000 compared to 12.1% nationally. The employment status of those at least 15 was 561 (58.8%) full-time, 114 (11.9%) part-time, and 12 (1.3%) unemployed.

== Education ==
Glenavy School is a full primary school serving years 1 to 8, with a roll of 121 students as of July 2026. The school opened in 1889.
