= Douglas, New Zealand =

Douglas, New Zealand may refer to:

- Douglas, Canterbury
- Douglas, Taranaki
