= Acteon pahaka =

Scientific classification
- Kingdom: Animalia
- Phylum: Mollusca
- Class: Gastropoda
- Superfamily: Acteonoidea
- Family: Acteonidae
- Genus: Acteon
- Species: †A. pahaka

Binomial name
- †Acteon pahaka P. A. Maxwell, 1992

Synonyms
- † Acteon (Maxacteon) pahaka P. A. Maxwell, 1992 alternative representation

Extinct species of gastropods

Acteon pahaka is an extinct species of sea snail, a marine gastropod mollusc in the family Acteonidae.

== Description ==
The length of the shell, excluding the spire, attains 7.5 mm, its diameter is 4 mm.

== Distribution ==
Fossils of this marine species have been found in Eocene strata near the Waihao River, South Canterbury, New Zealand.
