= Te Huruhuru =

Ngai Tahu leader

Te Huruhuru (c. 1800s – 1861) was a New Zealand tribal leader. Of Māori descent, he identified with the Ngāi Tahu iwi.

Surveyor for the New Zealand Company Charles Torlesse camped in the Hunters Hills with him in 1849, and he has one of the peaks of that mountain range named after him.

He provided the first preserved map of the Lake Wānaka district before it had been seen by Europeans.

His agreement with Michael Studholme in July 1854 allowed the foundation of the Te Waimate sheep station near Waimate.
