= Studholme =

- Rural locality
- Interactive map of Studholme
- Coordinates: 44.727°S 171.125°E
- Country: New Zealand
- Region: Canterbury
- Territorial authority: Waimate District
- Ward: Lower Waihao Ward
- Electorates: Waitaki; Te Tai Tonga

Government
  - Local authority: Waimate District Council
  - Regional council: Environment Canterbury
- Time zone: UTC+12 (NZST)
  - Summer (DST): UTC+13 (NZDT)
- Postcode: 7980
- Area code: 03
- Local iwi: Ngāi Tahu

Studholme is a locality in southern Canterbury in New Zealand's South Island. It is named after Michael Studholme, a pioneer European settler who arrived in the area in 1854.

== Geography ==
Studholme is situated on the coastal plains of the Waihao River and Waimate Creek, on the shores of the Pacific Ocean and Wainono Lagoon. Approximately seven kilometres west is Waimate, the largest town in the district. Other nearby localities include Hook to the north and Nukuroa and Willowbridge to the south.

== Transport ==
Studholme is situated on State Highway 1 and the Main South Line railway. The railway was opened on 1 February 1877 and still operates today, although passenger services ceased after the cancellation of the Southerner express train on 10 February 2002. Not long after the railway was opened, Studholme became a junction when a branch line was built to Waimate. Known as the Waimate Branch, this line began operating on 19 March 1877 and ran until 31 March 1966, from which point Studholme became the transshipment point for rail freight to and from Waimate. The abandoned formation of the branch, now trackless, can still be seen leaving the main line in Studholme.

== Economy ==
Studholme's economy is primarily agricultural. Industrial activity is directly related to agriculture; for example, a dairy factory was formally opened in late October 2007 and it produces products such as milk powder.

== Demographics ==
Studholme is part of the Makikihi-Willowbridge statistical area.

== Notable people ==
- David Lindsay – rugby union player
