= Makikihi River =

Coordinates: 44°38′S 171°09′E

Location
- Country: New Zealand

Physical characteristics
- Source
  - location: Hunters Hills
- Mouth
  - location: Pacific Ocean
- Length: 20 km (12 mi)

The Makikihi River is a river of the South Canterbury region of New Zealand's South Island. It flows east from its headwaters in the Hunters Hills 30 kilometres (19 mi) southwest of Timaru, and passes through the small township of Makikihi before reaching the Pacific Ocean.

The New Zealand Ministry for Culture and Heritage gives a translation of "cicada stream" for Mākikihi.

== See also ==
- List of rivers of New Zealand
