= Waihao River =

River in New Zealand

Coordinates: 44°47′S 171°10′E

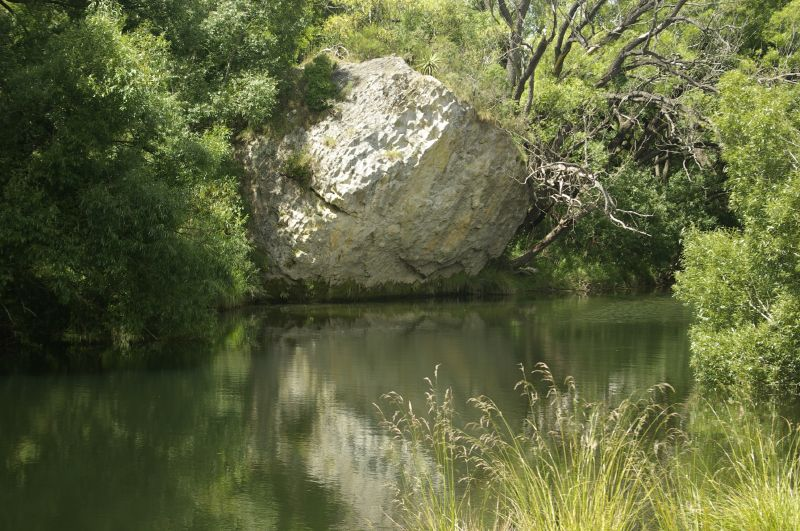
Waihao River

The Waihao River is a natural watercourse in the Canterbury region of New Zealand's South Island. It flows into the Wainono Lagoon near Studholme.

The New Zealand Ministry for Culture and Heritage gives translations of "water of net fishing" or "water with eels" for Waihao. Hao refers to the shortfin eel.

== Characteristics ==
Its headwaters are in the Hunter Hills, foothills of the Southern Alps, and its catchment area is 550 square kilometres (210 mi^{2}). The catchment receives approximately 1,000 millimetres (39 in) of rain annually. In its upper reaches, the river has two branches, the North Branch and South Branch, which join together at Waihao Forks. The river is well defined, but when it nears the coast, it becomes a braided river and has a floodplain of 25 square kilometres (9.7 mi^{2}). When it reaches the coast, the river turns and flows northwards, being joined by the Waimate Creek before discharging into the Wainono Lagoon in Studholme, a locality to the east of the town of Waimate. However, a culvert known as the Waihao Box has been cut into the gravel berm that separates the river from the Pacific Ocean to provide permanent sea access.

== Crossings ==
The river is crossed by two major roads. State Highway 1 crosses it near the coast between Willowbridge and Morven, while State Highway 82 crosses it inland at Waihao Forks. Near the State Highway 1 crossing, it is also crossed by the Main South Line railway, and inland, it was formerly crossed by the Waimate Gorge Branch. This branch line closed in 1953 and the bridges have been removed.

== Uses ==
Agricultural activity occurs the length of the river and it is thus a source of irrigation. It is also used for recreational purposes. Fishers visit the river to fish for brown trout. It is also followed by a walkway for approximately 5 kilometres (3 mi) near Waihao Forks.

== Events ==
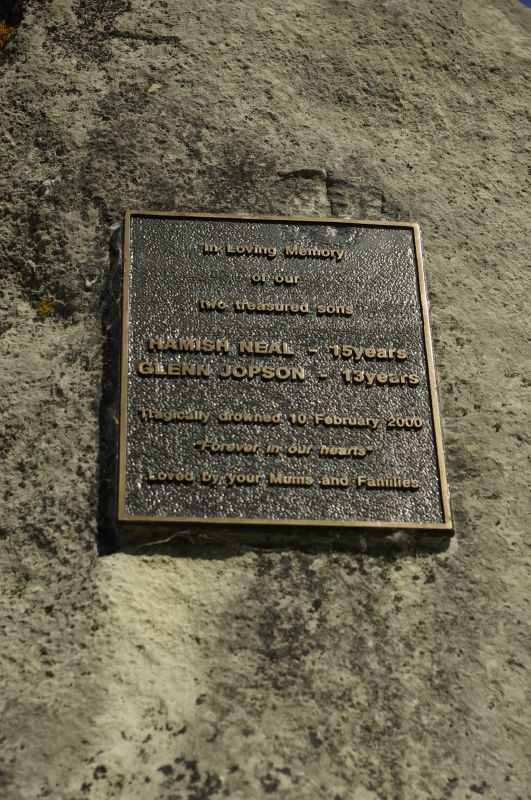
Memorial plaque at Waihao Forks

The river has been prone to flooding, with eighteen major flooding events occurring in the 20th century. The only decades during which major floods did not occur were the 1910s and 1970s, and major floods occurred every year from 1950 to 1953. Environment Canterbury and the local council have implemented strategies to reduce flooding, including the maintenance of stopbanks, managing the riparian zone to lower erosion, and restricting development to mitigate damage.

In 2000, two disabled students aged 13 and 15 drowned while on a school trip to Black Hole, a swimming hole on the Waihao River. This event stimulated a re-assessment of school policies, and partly as a response to the incident, new safety guidelines were issued by the Ministry of Education. In 2004, the mothers of the students sued the high school for breaching its duty of care to the students; the case was settled out of court in September 2007.
