= Eric Batchelor =

New Zealand soldier (1920–2010)

- Born: 29 August 1920; Waimate, New Zealand
- Died: 10 July 2010 (aged 89); Waimate, New Zealand
- Military career
- Allegiance: New Zealand
- Branch: New Zealand Army
- Service years: 1941–1946
- Rank: Sergeant
- Nickname: The Ferret
- Unit: 23 Battalion
- Conflicts: Second World War; Italian campaign; North African campaign
- Awards: Distinguished Conduct Medal & Bar; Mentioned in Despatches

Eric Batchelor DCM & Bar (29 August 1920 – 10 July 2010) was a New Zealand soldier who was twice awarded the Distinguished Conduct Medal for conspicuous bravery in Italy during World War II. He was the only New Zealand soldier of just nine British Commonwealth soldiers during the World War II to receive the DCM and bar. He was also Mentioned in Despatches, and fought at El Alamein in Egypt.

== Biography ==
Batchelor was born in Waimate and educated at Waimate Main School. He joined 5th Reinforcements in 1941. He later served with 23 NZ Battalion in North Africa and Italy. He also took part in the battles of Monte Cassino. He was twice wounded.

Batchelor's first DCM was awarded for gallantry, while in command of a forward platoon, during a fierce close quarter fight in a small house behind German lines at San Donato, on 21 July 1944, in the advance to Florence. He was awarded his second DCM for gallantry, while serving as a platoon sergeant in a forward company, during an assault on Celle, south-west of Faenza in Italy, on 14 December 1944. He was demobilised in 1946.

Batchelor's ability to work quickly and quietly through the black of night earned him the nickname 'the ferret' and the 'waimate warrior'.

In 1953, Batchelor was awarded the Queen Elizabeth II Coronation Medal.

Batchelor later ran a taxi business then a delicatessen and after that a wine shop.

Batchelor died in his hometown of Waimate in New Zealand on 10 July 2010.

== Legacy ==
In 2011, a sports tournament in Batchelor's name was initiated. The Eric Batchelor Cup is held every two years in Waimate, with Army Reserve Forces from around the South Island competing in a range of sporting activities including touch rugby, football, volleyball and netball.

A biography titled 'The Ferret' was published in 2017 about Batchelor's tales from the war.
