= Pareora =

- Rural settlement
- Interactive map of Pareora
- Coordinates: 44.488°S 171.215°E
- Country: New Zealand
- Region: Canterbury
- Territorial authority: Timaru District
- Ward: Timaru
- Electorates: Waitaki; Te Tai Tonga (Māori)

Government
  - Territorial authority: Timaru District Council
  - Regional council: Environment Canterbury
  - Mayor of Timaru: Nigel Bowen
  - Waitaki MP: Miles Anderson
  - Te Tai Tonga MP: Tākuta Ferris

Area
  - Total: 4.33 km^{2} (1.67 sq mi)

Population (June 2025)
  - Total: 480
  - Density: 110/km^{2} (290/sq mi)

Pareora is a small town in the South Island of New Zealand. It is located close to State Highway 1, which bypasses the western edge of the town, and close to the Pacific Ocean coast, five kilometres north of Saint Andrews and 10 kilometres south of Timaru. The Pareora River reaches the ocean just to the south of the township.

== Demographics ==
Pareora is described as a rural settlement by Statistics New Zealand, and covers 4.33 km^{2} (1.67 sq mi). It had an estimated population of 480 as of June 2025, with a population density of 111 people per km^{2}. The settlement is part of the larger Fairview statistical area.

Historical population
Year	Pop.	±% p.a.
2006	447	—
2013	429	−0.59%
2018	462	+1.49%
2023	456	−0.26%

Pareora had a population of 456 in the 2023 New Zealand census, a decrease of 6 people (−1.3%) since the 2018 census, and an increase of 27 people (6.3%) since the 2013 census. There were 240 males and 216 females in 180 dwellings. 2.6% of people identified as LGBTIQ+. The median age was 41.1 years (compared with 38.1 years nationally). There were 84 people (18.4%) aged under 15 years, 69 (15.1%) aged 15 to 29, 240 (52.6%) aged 30 to 64, and 63 (13.8%) aged 65 or older.

People could identify as more than one ethnicity. The results were 84.9% European (Pākehā), 15.8% Māori, 5.3% Pasifika, 5.9% Asian, and 8.6% other, which includes people giving their ethnicity as "New Zealander". English was spoken by 97.4%, Māori by 1.3%, Samoan by 2.6%, and other languages by 3.3%. No language could be spoken by 1.3% (e.g. too young to talk). New Zealand Sign Language was known by 1.3%. The percentage of people born overseas was 13.2, compared with 28.8% nationally.

Religious affiliations were 23.7% Christian, 0.7% Hindu, and 0.7% Māori religious beliefs. People who answered that they had no religion were 65.8%, and 8.6% of people did not answer the census question.

Of those at least 15 years old, 27 (7.3%) people had a bachelor's or higher degree, 216 (58.1%) had a post-high school certificate or diploma, and 135 (36.3%) people exclusively held high school qualifications. The median income was $33,300, compared with $41,500 nationally. 12 people (3.2%) earned over $100,000 compared to 12.1% nationally. The employment status of those at least 15 was 189 (50.8%) full-time, 48 (12.9%) part-time, and 9 (2.4%) unemployed.

== Education ==
Pareora East School opened in 1907. It became a campus of Timaru South School in 2005. In 2018, it was closed due to a falling roll.
