= Waimate =

- Town
- Interactive map of Waimate
- Coordinates: 44°44′02″S 171°02′47″E
- Country: New Zealand
- Island: South Island
- District: Waimate District
- Ward: Waimate Ward
- Electorates: Waitaki; Te Tai Tonga (Māori)

Government
  - Territorial authority: Waimate District Council
  - Regional council: Environment Canterbury
  - Mayor of Waimate: Craig Rowley
  - Waitaki MP: Miles Anderson
  - Te Tai Tonga MP: Mananui Ramsden

Area
  - Urban area: 8.01 km^{2} (3.09 sq mi)

Population (June 2025)
  - Urban area: 3,610
  - Density: 451/km^{2} (1,170/sq mi)
- Postcode(s): 7924
- Area code: 03
- Website: www.waimate.org.nz

Waimate is a town in Canterbury, New Zealand, and the seat of Waimate District. It is situated just inland from the eastern coast of the South Island. The town is reached via a short detour west when travelling on State Highway One, the main north–south road. Waimate is 45.7 km south of Timaru, Canterbury's second city, 20 km north of the Waitaki River, which forms the border between Canterbury and the Otago province to the south, and 47.5 km north of Oamaru, the main town of the Waitaki District.

Waimate is well known for its population of Bennett's wallabies. These marsupials were introduced from Australia and now live wild in the countryside surrounding the town. It is also recognised for the White Horse Monument, which is a silhouette of a white horse that can be seen on the hills behind the town. It commemorates the Clydesdale horses that helped breaking in the land in earlier days. Visitors to the monument's lookout are rewarded with panoramic views of the town and the district's green plains out towards the Pacific Ocean.

== History ==
From 1877 until 1966, Waimate was served by the Waimate Branch, a branch line railway that connected with the Main South Line some seven kilometres east in Studholme. For roughly seventy years ending in 1953, the line ran beyond Waimate to Waihao Downs. When the branch line was closed on 31 March 1966, Waimate became the first major town in New Zealand to lose its railway connection.

== Geography ==
The Waimate District is bounded by the Waitaki River in the south, the Pareora River in the north and the Hakataramea Valley to the west. The district is a very productive agricultural area with a mix of pastoral, cropping, dairy farming, fruit and vegetable growing.

The Waihao River, which starts in the Hunter Hills catchment area runs eastwards on the southern side of the Waimate township joining with the Waimate Creek. They both eventually end up discharging very close to the sea into the Wainono Dead Arm, which then flows into the Wainono Lagoon near Studholme.

=== Water quality issues ===
Rising nitrate levels in the source water for the Lower Waihao rural water supply were observed by Waimate District Council in October 2024, and in December 2024 a do-not-drink notice was issued for the area.

== Climate ==
Climate data for Waimate (1991–2020 normals, extremes 1908–present)
Month	Jan	Feb	Mar	Apr	May	Jun	Jul	Aug	Sep	Oct	Nov	Dec	Year
Record high °C (°F)	36.1 (97.0)	39.0 (102.2)	32.5 (90.5)	30.4 (86.7)	27.5 (81.5)	23.4 (74.1)	21.3 (70.3)	23.4 (74.1)	30.0 (86.0)	32.2 (90.0)	31.9 (89.4)	34.8 (94.6)	39.0 (102.2)
Mean daily maximum °C (°F)	20.4 (68.7)	20.3 (68.5)	18.8 (65.8)	16.4 (61.5)	14.1 (57.4)	11.6 (52.9)	11.0 (51.8)	11.8 (53.2)	14.0 (57.2)	15.6 (60.1)	17.1 (62.8)	19.0 (66.2)	15.8 (60.5)
Daily mean °C (°F)	15.7 (60.3)	15.5 (59.9)	14.0 (57.2)	11.4 (52.5)	8.9 (48.0)	6.4 (43.5)	5.8 (42.4)	6.8 (44.2)	9.0 (48.2)	10.6 (51.1)	12.3 (54.1)	14.4 (57.9)	10.9 (51.6)
Mean daily minimum °C (°F)	11.0 (51.8)	10.8 (51.4)	9.2 (48.6)	6.4 (43.5)	3.8 (38.8)	1.2 (34.2)	0.5 (32.9)	1.9 (35.4)	4.0 (39.2)	5.7 (42.3)	7.5 (45.5)	9.8 (49.6)	6.0 (42.8)
Record low °C (°F)	1.4 (34.5)	1.0 (33.8)	−3.0 (26.6)	−3.2 (26.2)	−6.2 (20.8)	−7.5 (18.5)	−8.5 (16.7)	−10.0 (14.0)	−6.5 (20.3)	−3.3 (26.1)	−1.7 (28.9)	0.6 (33.1)	−10.0 (14.0)
Average rainfall mm (inches)	52.2 (2.06)	43.5 (1.71)	35.4 (1.39)	51.1 (2.01)	41.8 (1.65)	37.6 (1.48)	43.4 (1.71)	38.7 (1.52)	35.6 (1.40)	38.3 (1.51)	43.2 (1.70)	43.6 (1.72)	504.4 (19.86)
Source: NIWA

== Demographics ==
Waimate is described as a small urban area by Statistics New Zealand and covers 8.01 km^{2} (3.09 sq mi). It had an estimated population of 3,610 as of June 2025, with a population density of 451 people per km^{2}.

Historical population
Year	Pop.	±% p.a.
2006	3,288	—
2013	3,285	−0.01%
2018	3,456	+1.02%
2023	3,591	+0.77%

Waimate had a population of 3,591 in the 2023 New Zealand census, an increase of 135 people (3.9%) since the 2018 census, and an increase of 306 people (9.3%) since the 2013 census. There were 1,719 males, 1,860 females, and 9 people of other genders in 1,686 dwellings. 2.1% of people identified as LGBTIQ+. The median age was 55.7 years (compared with 38.1 years nationally). There were 480 people (13.4%) aged under 15 years, 423 (11.8%) aged 15 to 29, 1,443 (40.2%) aged 30 to 64, and 1,245 (34.7%) aged 65 or older.

People could identify as more than one ethnicity. The results were 92.0% European (Pākehā); 9.0% Māori; 1.3% Pasifika; 2.6% Asian; 0.8% Middle Eastern, Latin American and African New Zealanders (MELAA); and 4.0% other, which includes people giving their ethnicity as "New Zealander". English was spoken by 98.3%, Māori by 1.9%, Samoan by 0.2%, and other languages by 5.1%. No language could be spoken by 1.5% (e.g. too young to talk). New Zealand Sign Language was known by 0.3%. The percentage of people born overseas was 13.7, compared with 28.8% nationally.

Religious affiliations were 34.3% Christian, 0.4% Hindu, 0.2% Islam, 0.3% Māori religious beliefs, 0.2% Buddhist, 0.6% New Age, 0.1% Jewish, and 0.8% other religions. People who answered that they had no religion were 53.2%, and 9.9% of people did not answer the census question.

Of those at least 15 years old, 336 (10.8%) people had a bachelor's or higher degree, 1,662 (53.4%) had a post-high school certificate or diploma, and 1,116 (35.9%) people exclusively held high school qualifications. The median income was $27,900, compared with $41,500 nationally. 129 people (4.1%) earned over $100,000 compared to 12.1% nationally. The employment status of those at least 15 was 1,116 (35.9%) full-time, 390 (12.5%) part-time, and 54 (1.7%) unemployed.

Individual statistical areas
Name	Area (km^{2})	Population	Density (per km^{2})	Dwellings	Median age	Median income
Waimate North	4.47	582	130	270	55.5 years	$31,300
Waimate West	0.94	1,320	1,404	618	53.4 years	$26,300
Waimate East	2.60	1,689	1,689	801	57.4 years	$28,000
New Zealand					38.1 years	$41,500

== Nearby communities ==
- Glenavy
- Hook
- Hunter
- Ikawai
- Makikihi
- Morven
- Otaio
- Saint Andrews
- Studholme
- Waihao Downs
- Waihaorunga
- Waituna

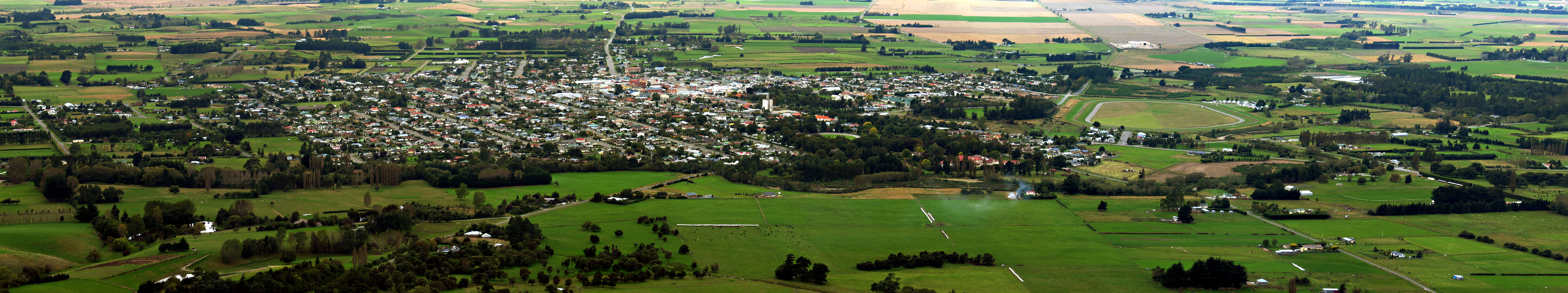
Panorama of the view from the White Horse overlooking Waimate township.

== Economy ==
Like much of rural New Zealand, Waimate suffered from an economic downturn in the 1980s, with the closure of the dairy factory and a number of sawmills. For the last decade of the 20th century the biggest employers in the district were two furniture manufacturers, a vegetable processing plant and a factory making French fries and other potato products at Makikihi. All but the latter closed within the first few years of the 21st century. However, a newly developed large scale sawmill and the development of a large milk powder factory, coupled with the wealth of dairy farms and the nationwide real estate bubble of 2003–2007, saw a renewed confidence in Waimate.

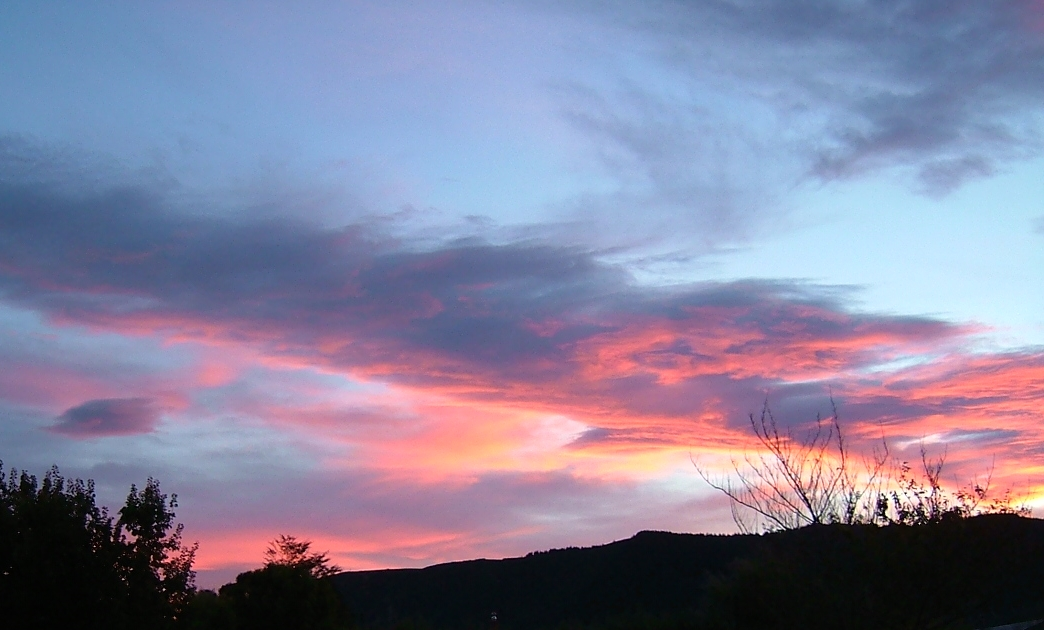
Photo of a sunset over the hills to the south of Waimate, taken from near the town centre.

== Education ==
Further Information: List of schools in Canterbury, New Zealand#Waimate District

Waimate Main School and Waimate Centennial School are contributing primary schools for students in years 1 to 6, with rolls of 84 and 136 students, respectively. Waimate Main opened in 1867 as Waimate Primary. Waimate Centennial opened in 1955 and catered for years 1 to 8 until 1982, when it reduced to years 1 to 6.

Waituna Creek School is a rural full primary about 6 kilometres northwest of Waimate. It caters for students in years 1 to 8 and has a roll of 30. It was established in 1879.

St Patrick's School is a Catholic state-integrated full primary for years 1 to 8 with a roll of 30 students. The school website says it was built by 1880, and the school celebrated 125 years of Catholic education in Waimate in 2005. The New Zealand Tablet reported that St Patrick's School opened during 1881.

Waimate High School is a secondary school for years 7 to 13 with a roll of 293 students. Waimate District High School opened in 1883. It became Waimate High on a new site in 1929, and in 1982 it expanded to also take year 7 and 8 students.

== Notable people from Waimate ==
- Eric Batchelor, a decorated Commonwealth NCO who served in World War II
- Ken Catran, novelist and screenwriter
- Margaret Cruickshank (1873–1918), the second woman to graduate in medicine in New Zealand and the first New Zealand woman to register and practise as a general practitioner. Although not born in Waimate, she spent her professional career there and her achievement is celebrated with a monument of her in the middle of the township.
- Mary Gorman, World War I nurse who died in the sinking of the SS Marquette
- A. M. Hamilton, notable for building the Hamilton Road through Kurdistan and designing the Callender-Hamilton bridge system
- Major General Howard Kippenberger, officer commanding New Zealand forces in North Africa during World War II. Though not born in Waimate, his father bought a farm there when he was young and he spent much of his early childhood there
- Norman Kirk, 29th Prime Minister of New Zealand, 1972–1974
- Neill Rattray (1896–1964), farmer, war veteran, and member of the New Zealand Legislative Council
- Jim Sheddan (1918–2010), flying ace of the Royal New Zealand Air Force during the Second World War
- Michael Studholme, the first European settler in the region
- Sir William Maxwell Manchester (1913–2001), founding plastic surgeon at Middlemore Hospital, Auckland in 1950
- Kaylee Bell, New Zealand country singer-songwriter

== Notable places ==
A statue of Zealandia, a female allegorical representation of New Zealand similar to Great Britain's Britannia, is located just off the main street. Only three Zealandia statues exist in the whole country: the one at Waimate, another at Palmerston in Otago, and a third in Auckland. The Waimate and Palmerston statues were erected as Boer War memorials, and the one in Auckland to commemorate troops who fought against Māori in the New Zealand Wars.

St Patrick's Basilica Catholic Church, located on Timaru Rd, was designed in 1908 by Francis Petre and is considered his most original design. St. Augustine's Anglican Church, located on John Street in Waimate, was designed in 1872 by Benjamin Mountfort.

Waihao marae, a marae (tribal meeting ground) of Ngāi Tahu and its Te Rūnanga o Waihao branch, is located in the Waimate district. It includes Centennial Memorial Hall, a wharenui (traditional meeting house).

Waimate Museum, located in Shearman St, was designed in 1878 by P.M.F. Burrows. Arcadia Theatre was originally built as Quinn's Arcade in 1906.

The White Horse Monument, built in 1968, is located at Centrewood Park, on a hill overlooking the town. The monument was created by farmers Norman and Betty Hayman to commemorate the contribution of Clydesdale and Shire horses to the district's farming economy.

== Sport ==
Waimate Rugby Football Club has teams competing in the South Canterbury rugby competitions. The club is affiliated with the South Canterbury Rugby Football Union.

Waimate Golf Club is on the outskirts of the town.

== Events ==
- March Hare Motorcycle Rally, annually, first weekend of March
- Waimate 50 Street Race, annually, October
- Waimate Strawberry Fare, annually, second weekend in December
  - Waimate Shears, annually, October
- Waimate Rodeo, annually, 27 December
- Claytons Debating Tournament, annually, July–August
- Waimate Museum Bookarama, annually, Labour Weekend
- Waimate Edwardian Heritage Celebrations, annually, second weekend in March

== Movies and film ==
- The Waimate Conspiracy (2006) was filmed in Waimate.

== Sister cities ==
- Bourail, France
- Milton-Freewater, USA
