= Saint Andrews, Canterbury =

Saint Andrews
- Rural settlement
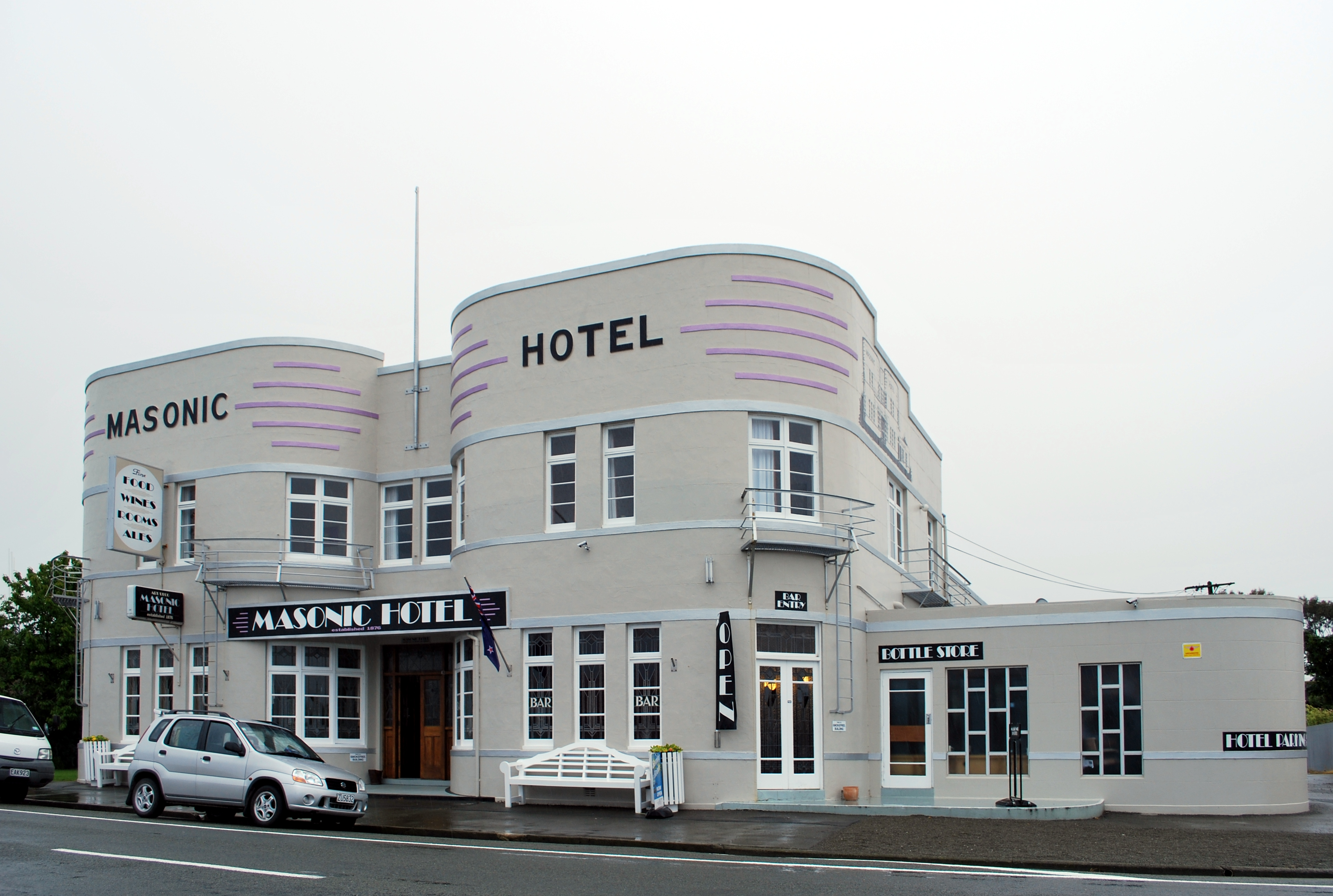
- Masonic Hotel in Saint Andrews
- Interactive map of Saint Andrews
- Coordinates: 44.533°S 171.188°E
- Country: New Zealand
- Region: Canterbury
- Territorial authority: Waimate District
- Ward: Pareora-Otaio-Makikihi Ward
- Electorates: Waitaki; Te Tai Tonga (Māori)

Government
  - Territorial authority: Waimate District Council
  - Regional council: Environment Canterbury
  - Mayor of Waimate: Craig Rowley
  - Waitaki MP: Miles Anderson
  - Te Tai Tonga MP: Mananui Ramsden

Area
  - Total: 0.59 km^{2} (0.23 sq mi)

Population (June 2025)
  - Total: 190
  - Density: 320/km^{2} (830/sq mi)
- Time zone: UTC+12 (New Zealand Standard Time)
  - Summer (DST): UTC+13 (New Zealand Daylight Time)
- Area code: 03

St Andrews is a small town in the south Canterbury region of New Zealand's South Island. It is located on State Highway 1 five kilometres south of Pareora and 17 kilometres south of Timaru. It was linked to Timaru by rail in 1876, and grew after the subdivision of the Pareora Run. It remains a rural service town.

== Demographics ==
Saint Andrews is described as a rural settlement by Statistics New Zealand, and covers 0.59 km^{2} (0.23 sq mi). It had an estimated population of 190 as of June 2025, with a population density of 322 people per km^{2}. The settlement is part of the larger Lyalldale statistical area.

Historical population for Saint Andrews
Year	Pop.	±% p.a.
2006	177	—
2013	180	+0.24%
2018	195	+1.61%
2023	192	−0.31%

St Andrews had a population of 192 in the 2023 New Zealand census, a decrease of 3 people (−1.5%) since the 2018 census, and an increase of 12 people (6.7%) since the 2013 census. There were 108 males, 84 females, and 3 people of other genders in 69 dwellings. 3.1% of people identified as LGBTIQ+. The median age was 48.6 years (compared with 38.1 years nationally). There were 33 people (17.2%) aged under 15 years, 21 (10.9%) aged 15 to 29, 93 (48.4%) aged 30 to 64, and 45 (23.4%) aged 65 or older.

People could identify as more than one ethnicity. The results were 93.8% European (Pākehā), 10.9% Māori, 1.6% Pasifika, 4.7% Asian, and 3.1% other, which includes people giving their ethnicity as "New Zealander". English was spoken by 98.4%, Māori by 1.6%, Samoan by 1.6%, and other languages by 1.6%. No language could be spoken by 1.6% (e.g. too young to talk). The percentage of people born overseas was 12.5, compared with 28.8% nationally.

The sole religious affiliation given was 29.7% Christian. People who answered that they had no religion were 57.8%, and 10.9% of people did not answer the census question.

Of those at least 15 years old, 18 (11.3%) people had a bachelor's or higher degree, 78 (49.1%) had a post-high school certificate or diploma, and 66 (41.5%) people exclusively held high school qualifications. The median income was $29,200, compared with $41,500 nationally. 9 people (5.7%) earned over $100,000 compared to 12.1% nationally. The employment status of those at least 15 was 81 (50.9%) full-time and 12 (7.5%) part-time.

=== Lyalldale statistical area ===
The Lyalldale statistical area includes Saint Andrews and covers 109.54 km^{2} (42.29 sq mi). It had an estimated population of 680 as of June 2025, with a population density of 6.2 people per km^{2}.

Historical population for Lyalldale
Year	Pop.	±% p.a.
2006	588	—
2013	636	+1.13%
2018	687	+1.55%
2023	666	−0.62%

Lyalldale had a population of 666 in the 2023 New Zealand census, a decrease of 21 people (−3.1%) since the 2018 census, and an increase of 30 people (4.7%) since the 2013 census. There were 348 males, 315 females, and 3 people of other genders in 249 dwellings. 1.8% of people identified as LGBTIQ+. The median age was 46.4 years (compared with 38.1 years nationally). There were 117 people (17.6%) aged under 15 years, 96 (14.4%) aged 15 to 29, 336 (50.5%) aged 30 to 64, and 120 (18.0%) aged 65 or older.

People could identify as more than one ethnicity. The results were 95.0% European (Pākehā); 11.3% Māori; 1.4% Pasifika; 2.7% Asian; 0.5% Middle Eastern, Latin American and African New Zealanders (MELAA); and 3.6% other, which includes people giving their ethnicity as "New Zealander". English was spoken by 97.3%, Māori by 1.4%, Samoan by 0.5%, and other languages by 4.1%. No language could be spoken by 1.4% (e.g. too young to talk). The percentage of people born overseas was 13.1, compared with 28.8% nationally.

Religious affiliations were 31.5% Christian, 0.5% Islam, 0.9% New Age, and 0.5% other religions. People who answered that they had no religion were 55.0%, and 11.7% of people did not answer the census question.

Of those at least 15 years old, 72 (13.1%) people had a bachelor's or higher degree, 318 (57.9%) had a post-high school certificate or diploma, and 156 (28.4%) people exclusively held high school qualifications. The median income was $39,000, compared with $41,500 nationally. 39 people (7.1%) earned over $100,000 compared to 12.1% nationally. The employment status of those at least 15 was 315 (57.4%) full-time, 63 (11.5%) part-time, and 12 (2.2%) unemployed.

== Education ==
St Andrew's School is a full primary school serving years 1 to 8, with a roll of 82 students as of July 2026. The school opened in 1881.
