= Mount Nimrod =

Mountain in the Hunters Hills area of Canterbury, New Zealand

- Mount Nimrod/Kaumira
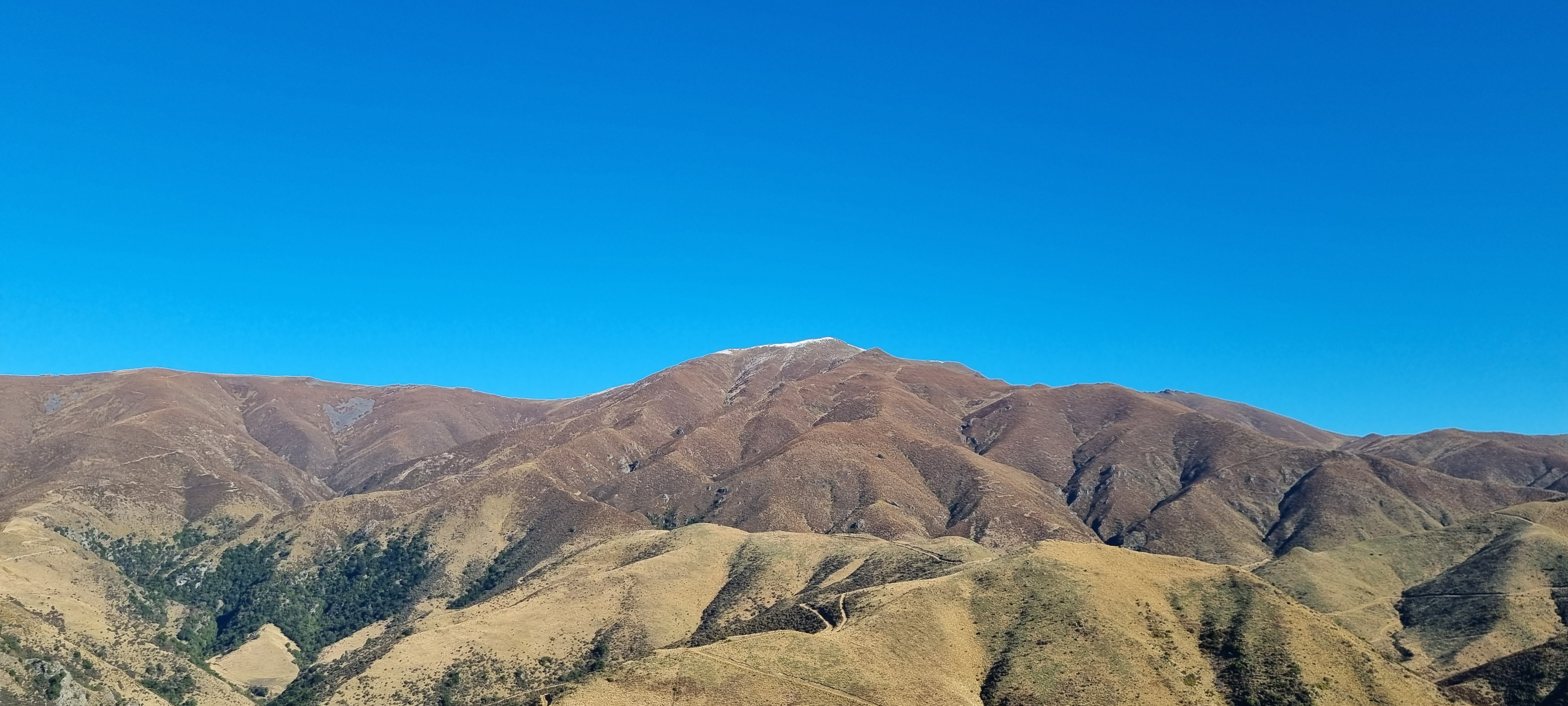

Highest point
- Elevation: 1,525 m (5,003 ft)
- Coordinates: 44°26′10″S 170°48′07″E

Naming
- Etymology: Probably Nimrod, the biblical king and hunter
- Native name: Kaumira (Māori)
- Defining authority: New Zealand Geographic Board

Geography
- Country: New Zealand
- Region: Canterbury
- Range coordinates: 44°25′08″S 170°45′14″E
- Parent range: Hunter Hills

Mount Nimrod (officially Mount Nimrod/Kaumira since 2010) is a hill in the Hunters Hills area of Canterbury, New Zealand.

== Naming ==
The English name first appears on a map in 1863 but the reason for it being used is unknown. Nimrod was a biblical hunter which has led to speculation. The Hunters Hills are named as they were a significant hunting area for the local Māori at the time of European settlement. Known in the Māori language as Te Tari a Te Kaumira meaning "the long range of Te Kaumira" who perished there in a snowstorm, hence the Māori name for Mount Nimrod.

== Geology ==
The uplifted Hunter Hills are built on greywacke basement with overlaying sediments including coal deposits. The uplift is related to the predominantly reverse Hunter Hills fault. The fault zone is not particularly active and has been mapped for 62 km (39 mi), with a slip rate of less than 1 mm (0.039 in)/year, an average displacement at events between 3–6 m (9.8–19.7 ft) that occur more than 10,000 years apart.

== Recreation ==
=== Hunting ===
The western slopes of the mountain are situated in public conservation land with hunting permits being required.

=== Mount Nimrod Scenic Reserve ===
On the mountains north eastern slopes is the Mount Nimrod Scenic Reserve northwest of the White Rock River. This is a haven for bird life and contains a 15 m (49 ft) waterfall. Access from the reserve to the hunting conservation areas on the far side of the mountain is not possible as the land in between is in private hands.

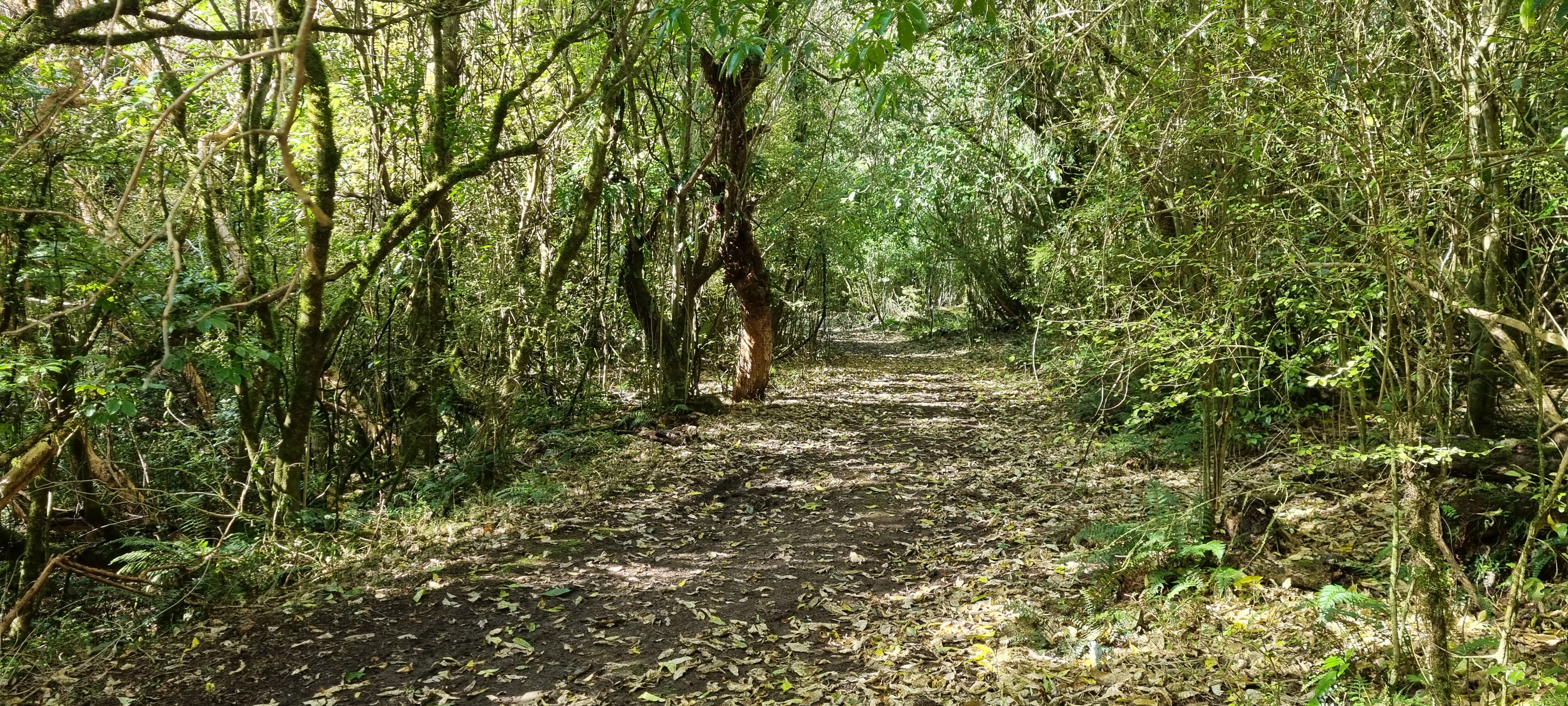
Easy part of the Nimrod Track going towards the car park

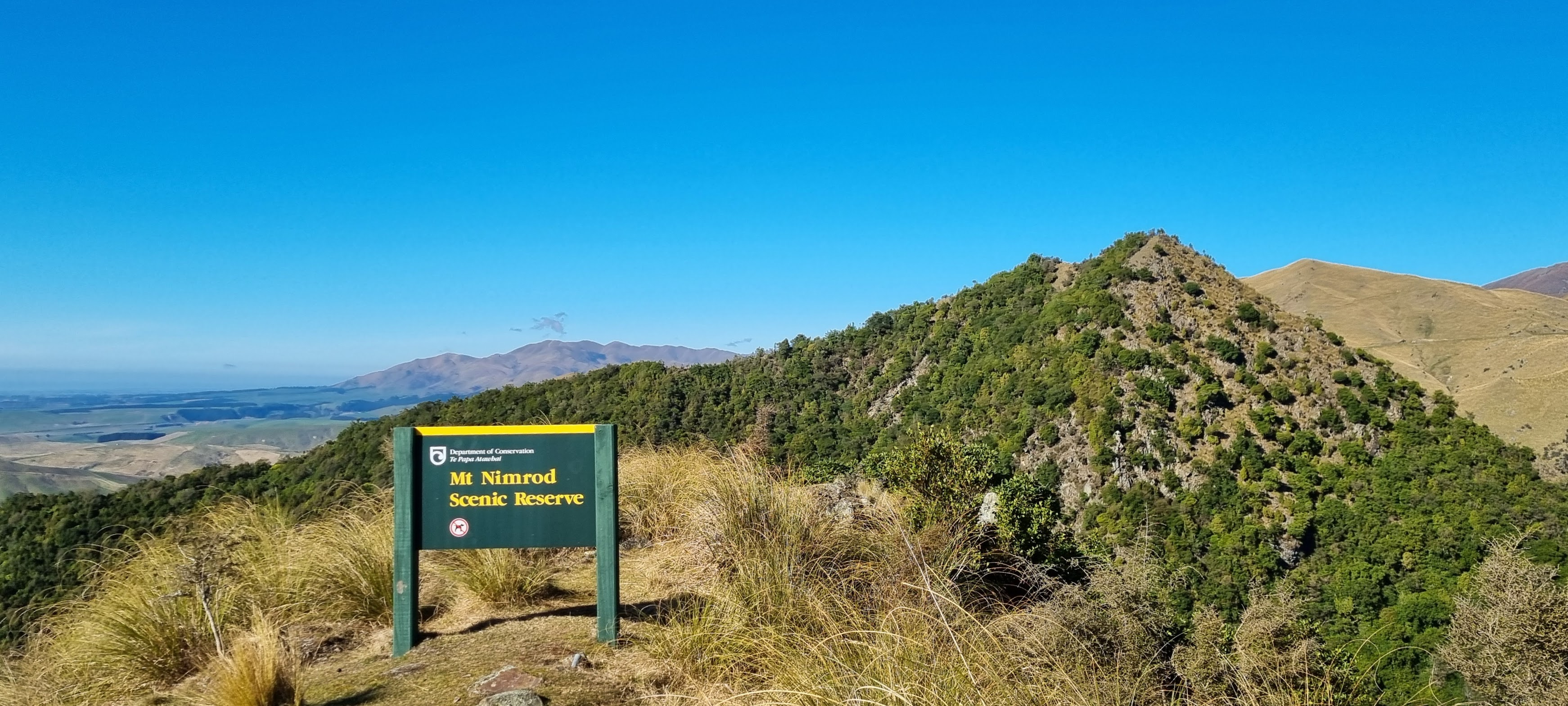
Top of the Nimrod Track looking towards point 650

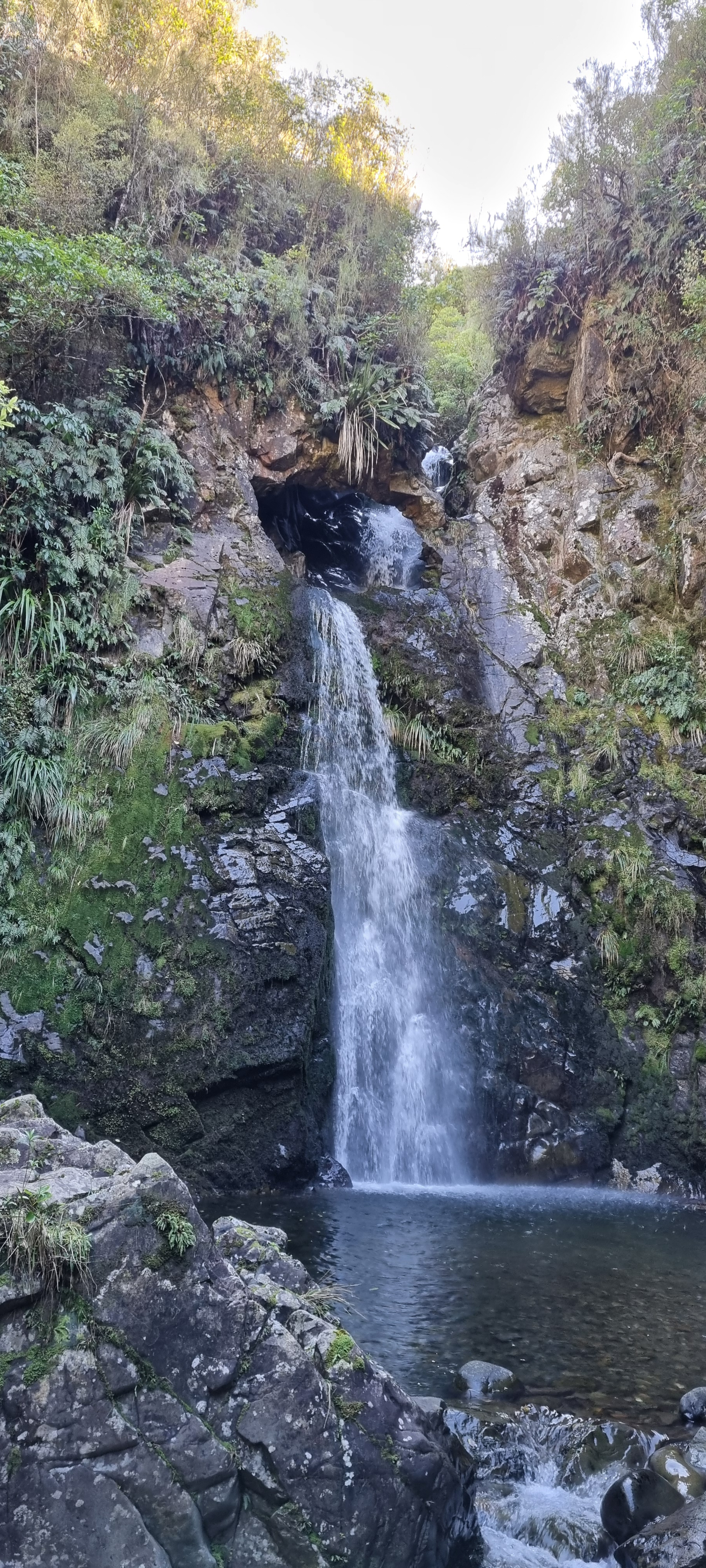
Waterfall on Nimrod Stream
