= Hook River =

River in Canterbury Region, New Zealand

Coordinates: 44°42′S 171°10′E

Hook River is a natural watercourse in the southern Canterbury region of New Zealand's South Island. The river flows east from its source to the Wainono Lagoon, a fresh water lake beside the Pacific Ocean. On the way, it passes through the localities of Waiariari and Hook and is crossed by State Highway 1 and the Main South Line railway. Water from the river and an associated aquifer is used for agricultural purposes.
