= Wainono Lagoon =

Fresh water lagoon of New Zealand's South Island

- Location within New Zealand
- Location: Canterbury, New Zealand
- Coordinates: 44°42′S 171°09′E
- Type: lagoon
- Primary inflows: Hook River, Waihao River

Wainono Lagoon is a shallow lagoon in the southern Canterbury region of New Zealand's South Island. A number of rivers flow into the lagoon, including the Hook River from the north and the Waihao River from the south. Nearby settlements include Hook and Studholme, with the town of Waimate approximately eight kilometres west.

Although it is within metres of the Pacific Ocean, the Wainono Lagoon is fresh water and separated from the sea by a gravel berm. Tests have revealed that the level of the lagoon does not fluctuate with the tide and its level of salinity is low. Fresh water, however, seeps from the lagoon into the sea.

The Department of Conservation (DOC) has established the Wainono Lagoon Conservation Area to protect the natural environment of the lagoon. The Waitangi Tribunal in 1995 directed DOC to develop the lagoon as a traditional fishery resource with Ngāi Tahu.
