= Pareora River =

River in New Zealand

Coordinates: 44°30′S 171°13′E

Location
- Country: New Zealand

Physical characteristics
- Source
  - location: Hunters Hills
- Mouth
  - location: Pacific Ocean
- Length: 56 km (35 mi)

The Pareora River is a river of the Canterbury region of New Zealand's South Island. It has its origins in several small streams flowing from the Hunters Hills, and flows north before turning southeast to reach the Pacific Ocean at the southern end of the township of Pareora, 8 kilometres (5 mi) south of Timaru. The river ends in a hapua-type river mouth, this means the flow to the ocean is impeded by a gravel bank.

== See also ==
- List of rivers of New Zealand
