= Waimate Branch =

Waimate & Waimate Gorge Branches
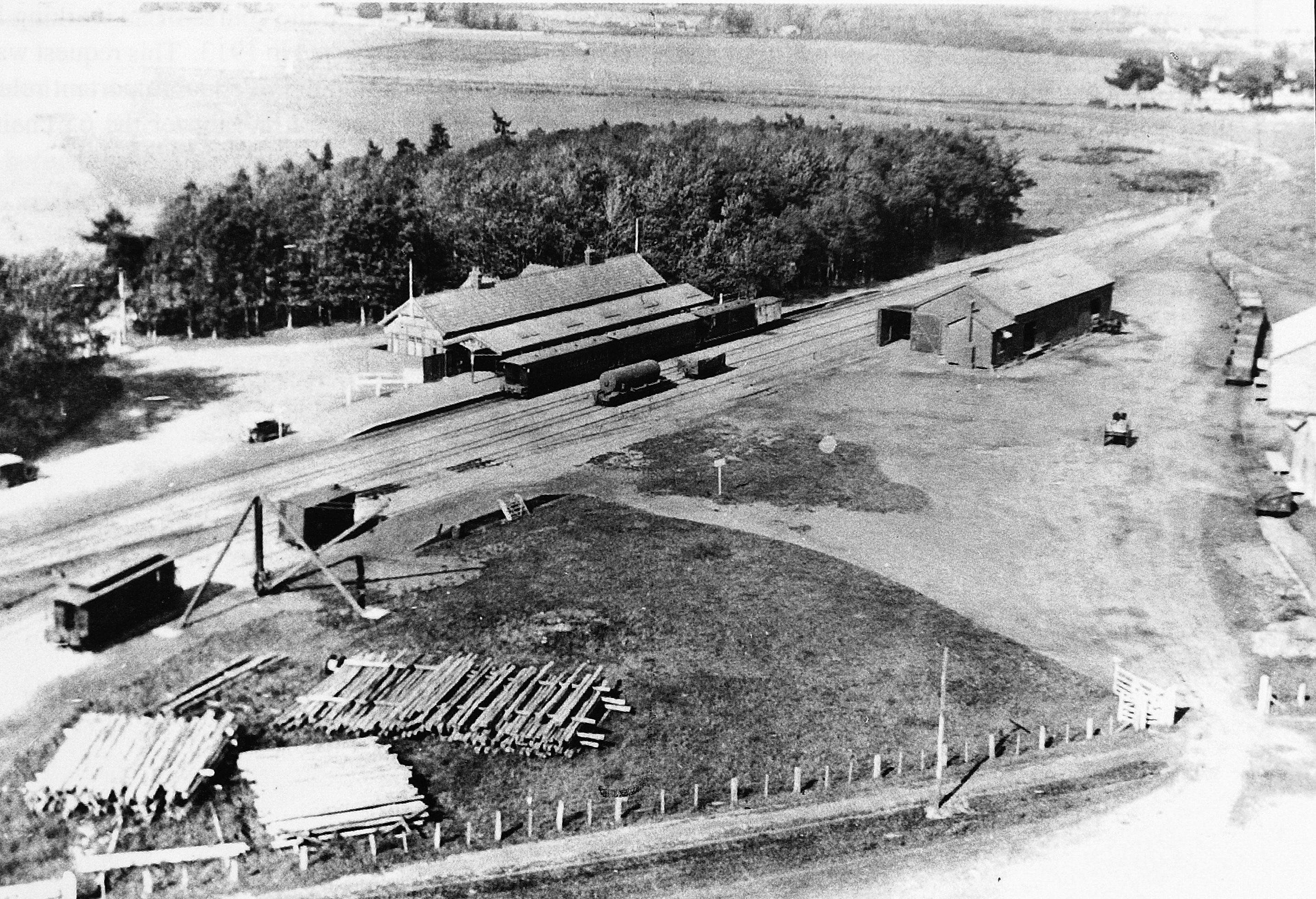
- Waimate, 1921

Overview
- Other name: Waihao Downs Branch
- Status: Closed
- Owner: Railways Department
- Locale: Canterbury, New Zealand
- Termini: Studholme; Waihao Downs
- Stations: 6

Service
- Type: Heavy Rail
- System: New Zealand Government Railways (NZGR)
- Services: 2
- Operator: Railways Department

History
- Opened: 19 March 1877
- Extended to Waihao Forks: 2 February 1883
- Extended to Waihao Downs: 24 April 1883
- Closed beyond Waimate: 12 November 1953
- Closed: 31 March 1966

Technical
- Line length: 7.42 km (Waimate Branch); 13.32 km (Waimate Gorge Branch)
- Num of tracks: Single
- Character: Rural
- Track gauge: 3 ft 6 in (1,067 mm)

Map

The Waimate Branch was a branch line railway built in southern Canterbury, New Zealand to link the Main South Line with the town of Waimate, the centre of the surrounding rural area. It opened in 1877 and operated until 1966; for some of this time, it included an extension to Waihao Downs that was known as the Waimate Gorge Branch or Waihao Downs Branch. When the line closed, Waimate received the dubious distinction of being New Zealand's first major town to lose its railway line.

== Construction ==
Located roughly halfway between Timaru and Oamaru, Waimate is the major market and service town for the surrounding district, but when the Main South Line between Christchurch and Dunedin was constructed, it was built some 7 km (4.3 mi) to the east of the township so that it could follow a direct route along the coastal plain without deviating. Both government and residents agreed that a link from the main line village of Studholme to Waimate was necessary. In 1876, tenders were called for the line and the winning offer, George Pratt's of £4,831, was accepted on 10 March 1876. Construction was not difficult and the branch opened on 19 March 1877. The first train was hauled by an A class tank locomotive and had three carriages plus a guard's van.

Two proposals for an extension were made, of which only one eventuated. The plan which did not eventuate was to link Waimate to either Duntroon or Livingstone. One of the proposals for the Otago Central Railway was to build a line from Oamaru to Naseby, and in 1877 an invitation was extended to the Waimate County Council to partake in a plan to connect Waimate to the Oamaru-Naseby line in either Duntroon or Livingstone and thus establish a through route from Central Otago to Canterbury. A deputation representing the advocates of the Oamaru-Naseby line made a presentation before the Waimate County Council on 12 July 1877, but the Council did not view the proposal as desirable. The Oamaru-Naseby proposal itself failed to come to fruition, with Duntroon ultimately served by the Kurow Branch and Livingstone located near the terminus of the Tokarahi Branch.

The other extension proposal was for a line into the hinterland behind Waimate, and this one was successful. Local residents established the Waimate Railway Company in late 1878 to construct an extension from Waimate to the Waihao Valley, and work commenced after W. J. Black's tender for construction of the first section was accepted on 16 April 1882. The initial 11.27 km (7.00 mi) were built quickly, with the line opened to Waihao Forks on 2 February 1883. Another 2.05 km (1.27 mi) of trackage to Waihao Downs followed, and this was opened on 24 April 1883, with a small locomotive depot established at the Waihao Downs station. On 1 April 1885, in accordance with the terms of the 1878 District Railways Act under which the Waimate Gorge Branch had been built, the government agreed to take control of the line. There was local pressure to extend the line further and some formation was constructed in 1914 with the goal of continuing the railway to Waihaorunga. World War I brought construction to a halt as resources were diverted elsewhere and work did not resume after the war ended. By 1924, the government had decided that extending rural branch lines was not profitable and thus permanently put an end to any plans to build beyond Waihao Downs.

== Stations ==
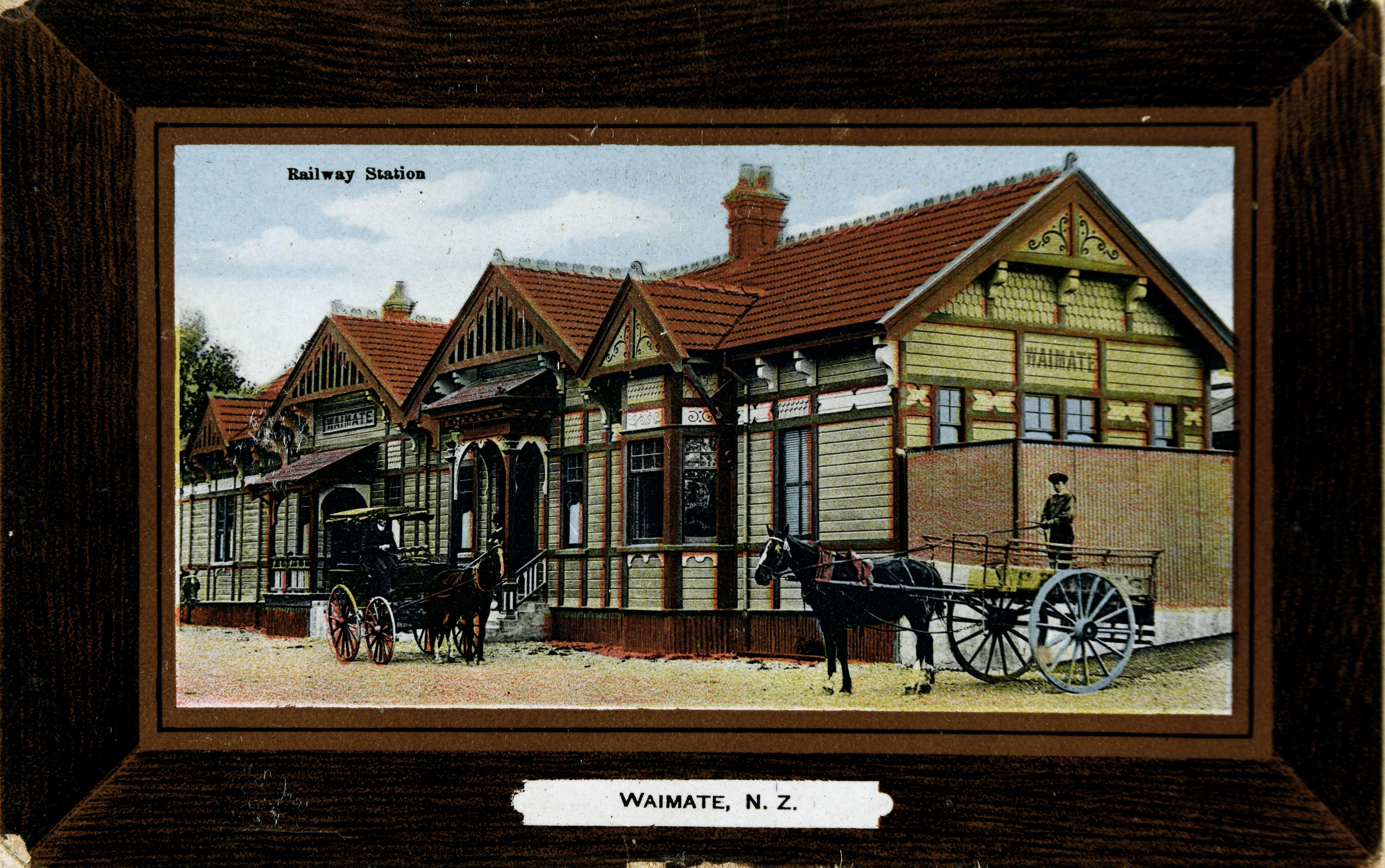
Waimate station c.1887 - c.1915

The only station on the Waimate Branch was the terminus, located 7.42 km (4.61 mi) from the Main South Line junction in Studholme.

The following stations were located on the Waimate Gorge Branch (in brackets is the distance from Waimate):

- Arno ( 4 miles 25 chains (6.9 kilometres) ) was originally named Gorge, had a 5th class station, 35 ft (11 m) platform, with a cart approach and a 30 ft (9.1 m) loading bank, which had its 7-ton crane replaced by a 10-ton crane in 1937. In 1936 stone quarried at Arno was being railed to protect the foreshore at the Oamaru Corporation Gas Works. It closed to all traffic on 23 July 1950.
- McLeans (5 miles 25 chains (8.5 kilometres)) had a 5th class station, 31 ft (9.4 m) platform, with a cart approach and a 50 ft (15 m) loading bank.
- Waihao Forks (11.27 km (7.00 mi))
- Waihao Downs (13.32 km (8.28 mi))

== Operation ==
From the opening of the Waimate Branch, a shuttle service operated between Waimate and the mainline at Studholme, while a daily mixed train ran between Waihao Downs and Waimate. Motive power on the Waimate Gorge Branch was provided by F^{A} class tank locomotives for many years, primarily by F^{A} 10, F^{A} 41, and F^{A} 251. Due to Waimate's status as the central town of the surrounding region, it attracted inbound freight from over 160 km away, and most outbound traffic went to Timaru or Oamaru and the wharves located in those two centres. Waimate is known for its berry gardens, and at the height of the season in 1898, an average of five wagons of strawberries were railed out of Waimate daily. Passenger traffic on the line ceased and was replaced by buses on 9 February 1931, and around this time, the locomotive depot in Waihao Downs was closed and the Waimate Gorge Branch's regular daily mixed train was replaced by a goods service when required. Passenger trains did not become wholly absent from the Waimate Branch, as picnic trains still ran on occasions.

Traffic surged during World War II, in part due to petrol restrictions, but it slipped again with the coming of peace in 1945. New freight handling techniques and changes in coastal shipping patterns served to further lower the traffic on the branch, and with running costs mounting and deferred maintenance becoming more and more necessary, the government took the step of closing the Waihao Downs section on 11 December 1953 and then the entire line on 31 March 1966. All previous branch closures had been of lines serving rural areas and small townships, so Waimate became New Zealand's first major town to lose its railway connection if one excludes the 1955 closure of the isolated Nelson Section (although it served only small settlements, it began in Nelson and was the only railway to serve the city).

== Today ==
The remains of old railways typically perish with time due to both natural influences and human development, and the Waimate Branch Line is no exception. There are no readily obvious remnants of the line in the town of Waimate, though the formation between Waimate and the junction with the Main South Line can be clearly seen. Waimate station was advertised for sale in 1980. Along the route of the Waimate Gorge Branch Line out of Waimate, the line's formation including a cutting, a bridge abutment, and some brick culverts can be located, and for about 5 kms, a walkway follows the route of the line beside the Waihao River. At Waihao Forks, the old station still sits on a hillside with a carriage nearby, and at Waihao Downs, the loading bank and goods shed both exist in relatively good condition, though the goods shed has been added to on one side. Continuing past Waihao Downs, some of the formation created for the never-built extension is still visible.
