= State Highway 82 (New Zealand) =

Road in New Zealand

State Highway 82

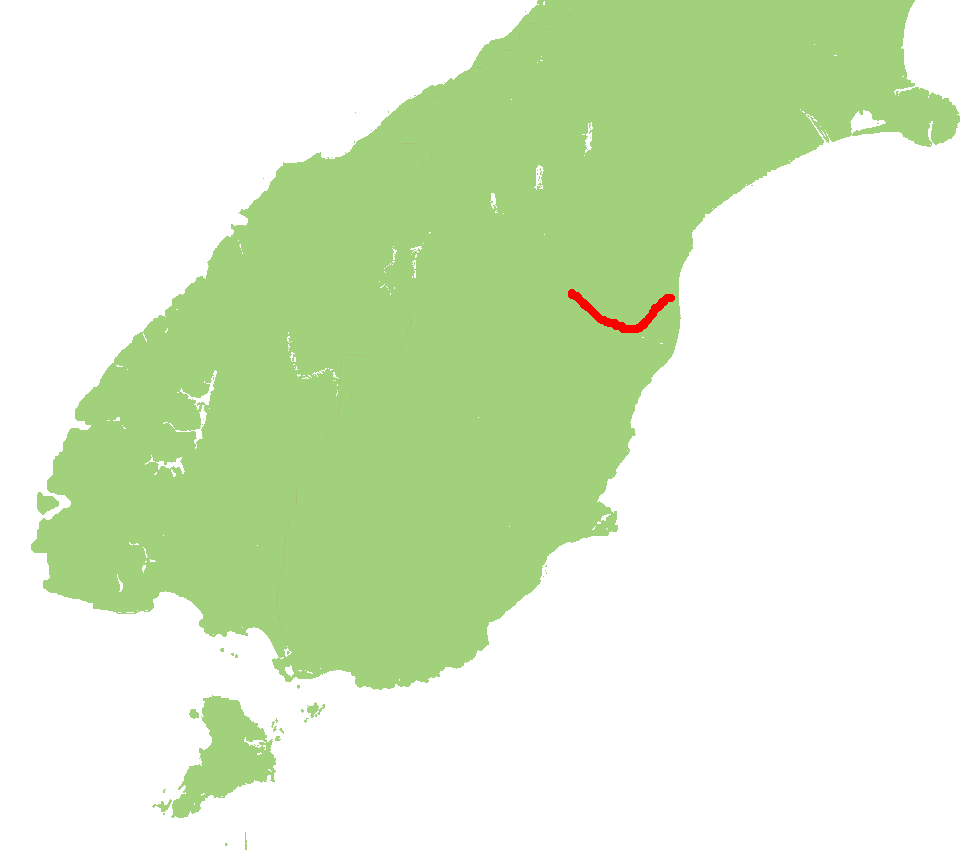

Route information
- Maintained by NZ Transport Agency Waka Kotahi
- Length: 71 km (44 mi)

Major junctions
- Northeast end: SH 1 at Hook
- Southwest end: SH 83 (Bledisloe Street) at Kurow

Location
- Country: New Zealand
- Primary destinations: Waimate

Highway system
- New Zealand state highways; Motorways and expressways; List
← SH 80	→ SH 83

State Highway 82 (SH 82) is a minor east-west South Island state highway in South Canterbury connecting SH 1 at the locality of Hook to SH 83 at the settlement of Kurow in the Waitaki Valley via the major town of Waimate. It is a two lane single carriageway.

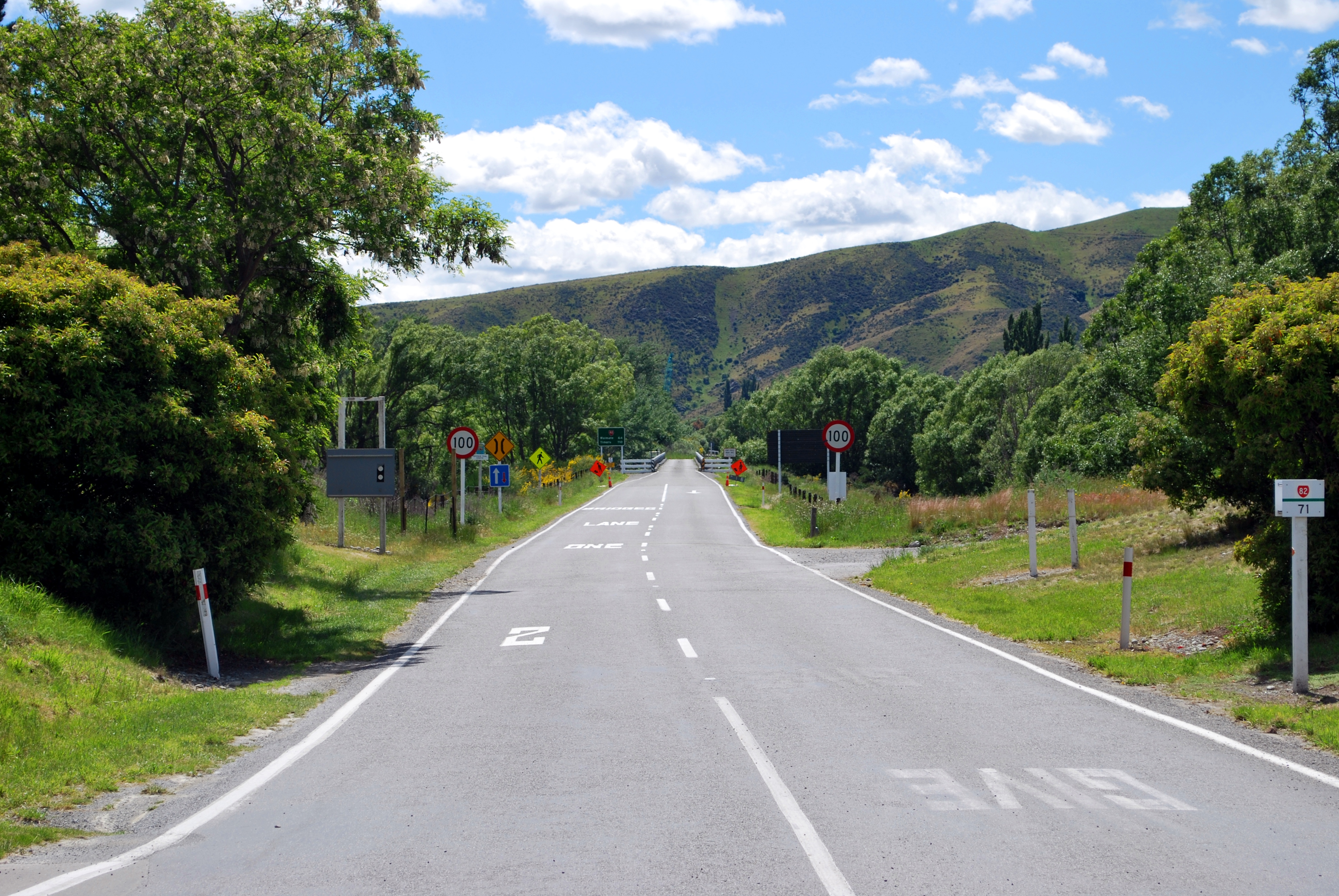
SH 82 about to cross the Waitaki River north of Kurow

The highway crosses the Waitaki River and provides a vital link between Kurow and Hakataramea. SH 82 has for a long time been notable for two 130 year-old single lane bridges (256m and 140m long). SH 82 offers the only handy alternative route for motorists to reach destinations north and south of the Waitaki River and without these bridges motorists using SH 1 would face lengthy detours via the Mackenzie District. Dating back to 1881 and 1893, these ageing structures were originally built as railway bridges but had recently reached the end of their serviceable lives. Extensive flood damage during December 1995/January 1996 that resulted in the closures of these bridges, highlighted their vulnerability to further flood damage.

In 2014 the bridges were upgraded to brand new two lane bridges along with a downstream cycle-pedestrian path. Timber from the two 19th-century bridges have been used to restore Helmores Lane Bridge in Christchurch, which was damaged in the 2011 Christchurch earthquake.

== See also ==
- List of New Zealand state highways
