= Hunters Hills =

Mountain range in Canterbury, New Zealand

- The Hunters Hills (Note: There is also a reference to the name Cheviot Range being previously used; such use would have caused confusion with hills in North Canterbury.)

Highest point
- Elevation: 1,601 m (5,253 ft)
- Coordinates: 44°25′08″S 170°45′14″E

Naming
- Native name: Te Tari a Te Kaumira (Māori)
- Defining authority: New Zealand Geographic Board

Geography
- Country: New Zealand
- Region: Canterbury

Hunters Hills (also known as The Hunters Hills, Te Tari a Te Kaumira (Māori)) is a range of mountains in South Canterbury, New Zealand.

== Naming ==
The Hunters Hills are named as they were a significant hunting area for the local Māori at the time of European settlement. They are known in the Māori language as Te Tari a Te Kaumira meaning "the long range of Te Kaumira" who perished there in a snowstorm. Surveyor Charles Torlesse camped in the Hunters Hills with the chief (rangatira) Te Huruhuru in 1849, who has one of the peaks named after him. Mount Studholme is named after the Studholme family who were early and successful farming pioneers.

== Geography ==
The hills extend inland from Waimate in a north-west trending line that gets higher and accumulates in Mount Nessing with a height of 1,601 m (5,253 ft). To their south is the valley of the Hakataramea River.

=== Geology ===
The Hunter Hills are based on uplifted sediments including coal deposits with a greywacke basement.

==== Hunters Hills fault ====
The uplift is related to the predominantly reverse Hunters Hills fault, which defines the south eastern border of the Cannington Basin. The two strand fault zone is not particularly active and has been mapped for 62 km (39 mi), with a slip rate of less than 1 mm (0.039 in)/year, an average displacement at events between 3–6 m (9.8–19.7 ft) that occur more than 10,000 years apart.

=== Peaks ===
Named Peaks in The Hunters Hills
Name	Height	Coordinates
Mount Nessing	1,601 metres (5,253 ft)	44.34793°S 170.70733°E
Te Huruhuru	1,591 m (5,220 ft)	44.39525°S 170.73866°E
Mount Nimrod	1,525 m (5,003 ft)	44.43623°S 170.80208°E
Mount Airini	1,426 m (4,678 ft)	44.49531°S 170.82367°E
Mount Studholme	1,086 m (3,563 ft)	44.64172°S 170.91118°E
Mount Cecil	1,007 m (3,304 ft)	44.588756°S 170.919328°E
Mount Blyth	1,005 m (3,297 ft)	44.56307°S 170.86043°E
Mount Shrives	958 m (3,143 ft)	44.67515°S 170.92396°E

== Weather ==
Often the upper part of hills is obscured by cloud in the late afternoon due to easterly winds from the sea carrying moisture inland. The breeze tends to be off the mountains overnight. The weather pattern locally includes recurring strong drying nor-westerly Foehn winds.

== Ecology ==
The area is part of the Canterbury–Otago tussock grasslands ecoregion. Tussock-grassland is dominant in the north east with tussock height being less higher up the mountains. In general tussock grassland distribution and that of mixed podocarp forest community is situational. The later is related to damp conditions and shelter, including in some cases from the Foehn winds. As mentioned earlier at the time of the arrival of Europeans the mountains were known for their food hunting potential by the Māori. The original tussock grassland at the time of European settlement was dominated by a dense growth of flax, fern, scrub and coarse grasses.

European sheep farming practices were introduced in the 1850s with the native tussock grassland being burnt off. Burn off was initially a common part of pastoral practice with a regular cycle being established and in place universally until the 1930s and it was noted in 1948 that continued burn off produced a quite different tussock ecosystem. Animal disturbance to the ecosystem after European settlement included pigs until the 1890s, rabbits by 1900 with their pest control by about 1912. Wallabies were introduced by the 1920s and were problematical by 1940s with a tendency to open out the native bush. Wallaby remain throughout the area and there are in the non farmed areas occasional goat, pig, red deer, fallow deer and chamois.

== Recreation ==
Public conservation land used for hunting with permits exists on the north western slopes of the range from their northern end to beyond Mount Nimrod and in an area extending from Mount Blyth to Mount Shrives.

=== Reserves ===
There is scenic reserve land on the north eastern slopes of Mount Nimrod and at the Waimate end of the range.
