= Mayor of Waimate =

- Incumbent; Craig Rowley since 2013
- Style: His/Her Worship
- Term length: Three years, renewable
- Formation: 1989
- Salary: $104,302
- Website: Official website

The Mayor of Waimate officiates over the Waimate District Council.

Craig Rowley has been the mayor of Waimate since 2013.

== List of mayors ==
On 8 September, 1879, Waimate was officially proclaimed a borough under the Municipal Corporations Act. Nominations for the first mayoral election took place on 29 September, 1879, with four candidates being chosen: John Manchester, Leonard Price, Alpheus Hayes, and George R. Freeman. The inaugural municipal election was held on 6 October, 1879, where Manchester received the highest number of votes. The final results of the 1879 Waimate mayoral election were: Manchester, 90; Hayes, 76; Price, 29; and Freeman, 3.

Since its establishment as a borough, Waimate has been served by 21 mayors.

| No. | Portrait | Name (birth–death) | Term of office |
|---|---|---|---|
| 1 | | John Manchester (1833–1911); 1st term | 1879–1881 |
| 2 | | Matthew Sherwin (1839–1921) | 1881–1882 |
| 3 | | Samuel W. Goldsmith (1828–1895) | 1882–1884 |
| 4 | | Charles V. Clarke (1842–1909); 1st term | 1884–1886 |
| 5 | | James Sinclair; 1st term | 1886–1887 |
| 6 | | Frank Slee (1832–1901) | 1887–1889 |
| (5) | | James Sinclair; 2nd term | 1889–1891 |
| 7 | | George H. Graham (1829–1911) | 1891–1893 |
| 8 | | William Coltman (1862–1940) | 1893–1895 |
| (4) | | Charles V. Clarke (1842–1909); 2nd term | 1895–1896 |
| 9 | | Robert Nicol (1846–1926) | 1896–1898 |
| 10 | | Herbert C. Barclay (1866–1932) | 1898–1901 |
| (1) | | John Manchester (1833–1911); 2nd term | 1901–1908 |
| 11 | | Norton Francis (1871–1939); 1st term | 1908–1912 |
| 12 | | John Black | 1912–1915 |
| (11) | | Norton Francis (1871–1939); 2nd term | 1915–1917 |
| 13 | | George Dash (1871–1959); 1st term | 1917–1919 |
| 14 | | William E. Evans (1869–1932); 1st term | 1919–1921 |
| 15 | | Frederick Nash (d. 1952) | 1921–1923 |
| (14) | | William E. Evans (1869–1932); 2nd term | 1923–1925 |
| (13) | | George Dash (1871–1959); 2nd term | 1925–1941 |
| 16 | | William Boland | 1941–1956 |
| 17 | | Alexander McRae | 1956–1974 |
| 18 | | Andrew McLay | 1974–1983 |
| 19 | | David Owen | 1983–2004 |
| 20 | | John Coles | 2004–2013 |
| 21 | | Craig Rowley | 2013–present |
