= Waimate District Council =

Coordinates: 44.734619°S 171.0441743°E

Waimate District Council Ko te kaunihera ā rohe o Waimate

Type
- Type: Unicameral of Waimate District
- Houses: Governing Body
- Term limits: None

History
- Founded: 6 March 1989

Leadership
- Mayor: Craig Rowley

Structure
- Seats: 9 (1 mayor, 8 ward seats)
- Length of term: 3 years

Website
- waimatedc.govt.nz

Waimate District Council (Māori: Ko te kaunihera ā rohe o Waimate) is the territorial authority for the Waimate District of New Zealand.

The council is led by the mayor of Waimate, who is currently Craig Rowley. There are also eight ward councillors.

== Composition ==
=== Councillors ===
- Mayor: Craig Rowley
- Waimate Ward: John Begg, Jakki Guilford, Peter David Paterson and Rick Stevens
- Pareora-Otaio-Makikihi Ward: Stacey Hall and Sandy McAlwee
- Hakataramea-Waihaorunga Ward: Paul Harrison
- Lower Waihao Ward: Sheila Paul

== History ==
The council was established in 1989, replacing the Waimate County Council established in 1876.

In 2020, the council had 58 full time equivalent staff, including nine earning more than $100,000. According to the right-wing Taxpayers' Union lobby group, residential rates averaged $1,964.
