= The Star (Dunedin) =

Free weekly newspaper in Dunedin, New Zealand

- Type: Weekly evening newspaper
- Format: Tabloid
- Owner: Allied Media
- Founded: 1 May 1863
- Headquarters: Dunedin, New Zealand
- Website: www.odt.co.nz/the-star

The Star is a free newspaper published weekly in Dunedin, New Zealand, by Allied Media since 1979. It is the successor to The Evening Star, which was the city's daily evening newspaper from June 1863 to 1979.

== History ==
=== Bell era ===
The Star was founded as the Evening Star in 1863 with the first issue appearing on 1 May 1863. It was founded by G. A. Henningham and Co., edited by George Henningham, and originally printed in Stafford Street, above the Exchange area of the city. In its first few years the company was bought by William Henningham, the founder's brother.

In June 1869, William Henningham ran into financial difficulties and the Evening Star was sold by liquidators to George Bell, who also ran a small evening paper, the Evening Independent. Bell merged the two newspapers to form firstly the short-lived Morning Star, and then the far more successful Evening Star, which was first published under this title on 14 June 1869. Under Bell's editorship the paper thrived and it soon began to outsell almost all of its rivals. Bell remained editor until 1894.

Following Bell's resignation, his family gained control of the Evening Star, which became a limited liability public company that was incorporated on 11 April 1895. The company's shareholders were his son George, his six daughters, Louisa's husband Frank Clapperton and Clara's husbands Charles Smith.

=== Growth and consolidation ===
Bell was succeeded by Evening Star journalist Mark Cohen as editor in 1894. Under Cohen's leadership, the Star advocated social reform and supported the New Zealand Liberal Party's policies. The Evening Star flourished under Cohen's leadership and attracted several contributors including Presbyterian minister and social reformer Rutherford Waddell. In 1897, the newspaper adopted linotype type-setting machines.

In 1907, the newspaper started a Saturday sports edition called Star Sports, which was published as a tabloid insert. While the Evening Star was a supporter of the Liberals and Prime Minister Richard John Seddon, the newspaper decided after the Liberal's defeat in 1912 not to financially support any political party. This policy was reversed when the Star's board of directors voted to donate NZ£50 to the United Party, a predecessor to the modern National Party.

In 1928, the Evening Star moved to a new headquarters at Stuart Street, which later became the headquarters of Allied Press. Though the Great Depression and the outbreak of the Second World War hindered the newspaper's plans for expansion, the Evening Star benefited from the post-war economic boom in New Zealand. Between 1950 and 1973, the newspaper prospered under the leadership of general manager Vic Cavanagh, a prominent rugby union coach. The Evening Star reached its climax during the 1960s when it had a circulation of more than 30,000. The second-longest lasting of Dunedin's newspapers, The Evening Star became a rival to Dunedin's morning newspaper the Otago Daily Times (ODT).

=== Allied Press/Media ===
The Evening Star's readership slowly declined during the period from the 1960s to the 1970s due to competition from commercial radio and television news. 1975, the Evening Star merged with its rival, the Otago Daily Times, to form a holding company called Allied Press. In 1979, Allied Press merged with John M. Fraser and Co Ltd to form a new privately-listed company called Otago Press and Produce Limited (OPP) following takeover attempts by H.W. Smith and Mount Cook Group.

By 1979, the Evening Star's circulation had fallen from 30,000 to under 20,000 due to competition from news broadcasters and its morning sister paper. As a result, the newspaper's sport issue 7 O'clock (the successor to the Star Sports) was discontinued in March 1979. By June 1979, the newspaper had become a tabloid. Due to the newspaper's declining revenue, Allied Press' board dissolved the Evening Star, with its last issue being published on 3 November 1979.

The Evening Star was subsequently replaced by a weekly community paper initially called Dunedin Weekender, then Dunedin Star Weekender then simply The Star. Allied Press still publishes the Otago Daily Times and numerous community and farming papers throughout New Zealand, as well as running Dunedin's local television station, Channel 39, until its closure in December 2023. Allied Press also owns the Evening Star's former headquarters at Stuart Street. The company's managing director Julian Smith is a great-great-grandson of George Bell.

== Sources ==
- Palenski, Ron (2019). The Star of the South: A history of the Evening Star newspaper. Dunedin: Allied Press. ISBN 978-0-473-48444-6.
