= The Oamaru Mail =

New Zealand newspaper

Oamaru Mail
- Your community, Your News
- Type: Weekly Newspaper
- Format: Tabloid
- Owner: Allied Media
- Editor: Rebecca Ryan
- Founded: 1876
- Headquarters: Oamaru, New Zealand
- Website: Oamaru Mail

The Oamaru Mail is a weekly community newspaper published each Friday in Oamaru, New Zealand, by the Dunedin–based media company Allied Press Ltd that serves the North Otago area.

== History ==
=== George Jones ===
The Oamaru Mail was first launched in April 1876 as the Evening Mail. The newspaper struggled financially for a few months with its shareholders considering winding up the company. In 1877, the newspaperman George Jones bought up the Evening Mail. Under Jones' ownership, the Evening Mail covered railway construction and land ownership.

In 1877, the Evening Mail was caught up in a criminal libel trial after Jones published an article accusing the Attorney-General Frederick Whitaker of promoting a Native Land Bill to assist in the acquisition of 2000,000 acres of confiscated Māori land for himself and his friends. Jones was acquitted during that trial, which boosted the Evening Mail's fortunes and public image. The New Zealand media hailed the outcome of the case as a victory for press freedom.

Boosted by a rise in advertising and circulation, the Evening Mail revamped itself as the Oamaru Mail in March 1879. The newspaper became part of a syndicate of evening newspapers that received cable news service from the Dunedin–based Evening Star. Jones became a successful politician and his family maintained control of the Mail and the Invercargill–based Southland News. Following Jones' death in 1920, his son E.A. Jones became the governing director of both the Oamaru Mail and the Southland News; the latter of which had been acquired by Southland News Ltd. The two companies were run in tandem with each other.

=== Star Media and Allied Media ===
For the next 140 years, the Oamaru Mail served the North Otago area.

In April 2013, Star Media (then known as Mainland Media) acquired the Oamaru Mail from APN Media. Star Media's owners, Charlotte and Pier Smulders, are part of the Smith family, who own the Allied Press stable of newspapers including the Otago Daily Times.

In July 2015, the newspaper underwent a restructuring process under its Allied Press owners. In mid-August 2015, Allied Press' editor in chief of community newspapers Barry Stewart confirmed that the paper would be undergoing a restructuring process. On 24 August 2015, Allied Press owner Sir Julian Smith announced that Oamaru Mail would shift from a five-day publication to a weekly publication, which would be launched in September 2015.

In August 2018, the Oamaru Mail's parent company Star Media formally became a subsidiary of Allies Press. On 31 July 2025, the two companies merged into one brand called Allied Media. The Oamaru Mail remained part of the consolidated brand.

== Operations and circulation ==
The news paper has a readership of about 10,000. Its circulation area stretches from Waimate in the north down through Oamaru to Palmerston (about 45 minutes out of Oamaru) and to Otematata in the West. The paper is printed in Dunedin, New Zealand.

== Management and staff ==
The current editor of the Oamaru Mail is Rebecca Ryan.

Reporters include Kayla Hodge, and Ashley Smyth. The newspaper's sales manager is Mark Julius with other advertising consultants including Sarah Taylor, John Shaw and Sue Fraser.
