= 1869 Waikouaiti by-election =

New Zealand by-election

The 1869 Waikouaiti by-election was a by-election held on 27 April 1869 in the Waikouaiti electorate during the 4th New Zealand Parliament.

The by-election was caused by the resignation of the incumbent MP Robert Mitchell.

The by-election was won by Francis Rich. As there were no other nominations, he was duly declared elected.
