= 1868 Waikouaiti by-election =

New Zealand by-election

The 1868 Waikouaiti by-election was a by-election held on 27 July 1868 in the Waikouaiti electorate during the 4th New Zealand Parliament.

The by-election was caused by the resignation of the incumbent MP William Murison on 10 July 1868.

The by-election was won by Robert Mitchell.

Mitchell stood for the "Centralist" party while his opponent William Pitt Gordon stood "in the Provincial Interest."

== Results ==
The following table gives the election result:

1868 Waikouaiti by-election
Party	Candidate	Votes	%	±%
Independent	Robert Mitchell	119	51.97	
Independent	William Pitt Gordon	110	48.03	
Majority		9	3.93	
Turnout		229		
