= Dunedin Law Courts =

Historic building in central Dunedin, New Zealand

Coordinates: 45.87539°S 170.50734°E

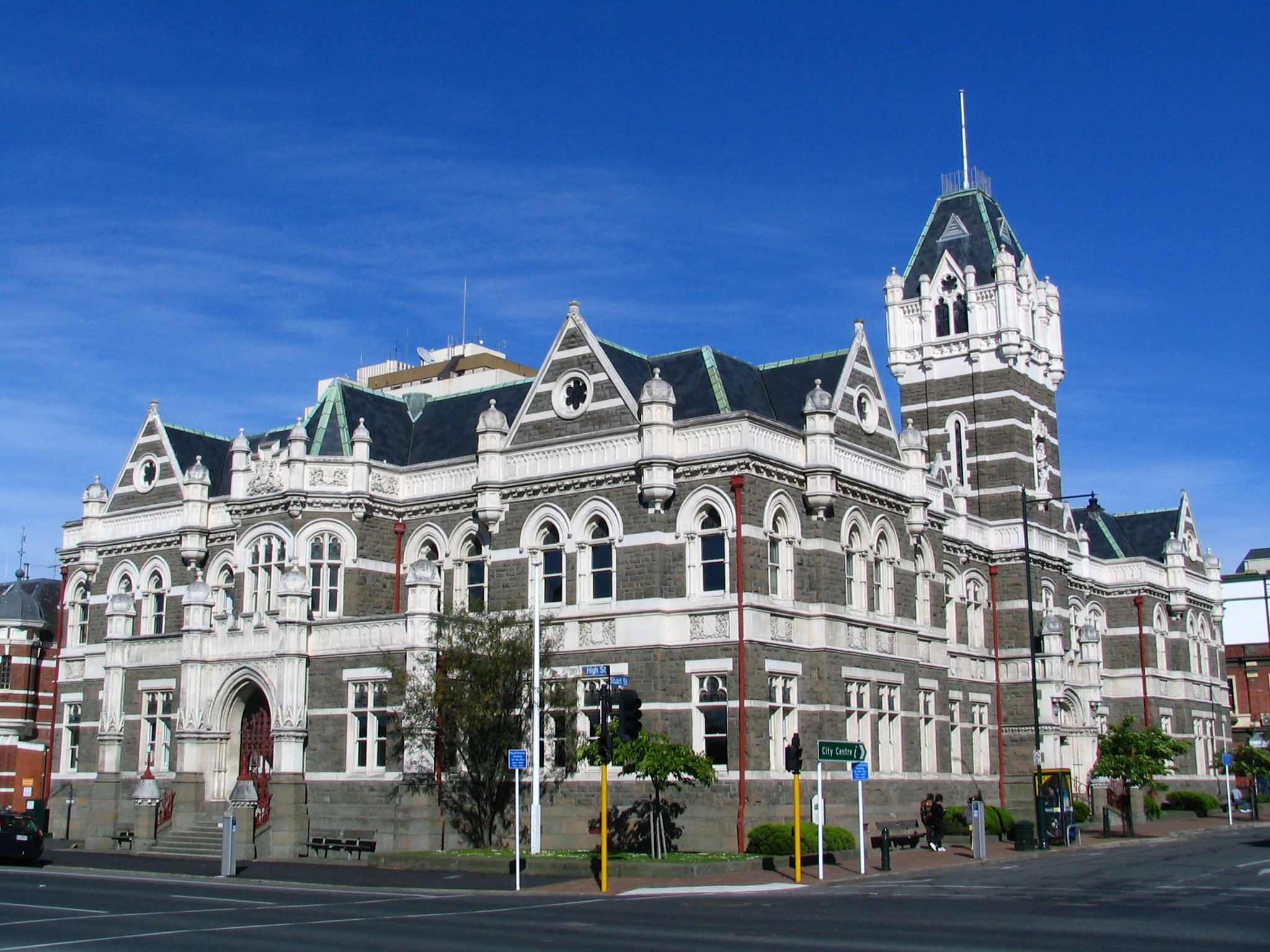
The Law Courts building was completed in 1902. It continues to be used as a court today.

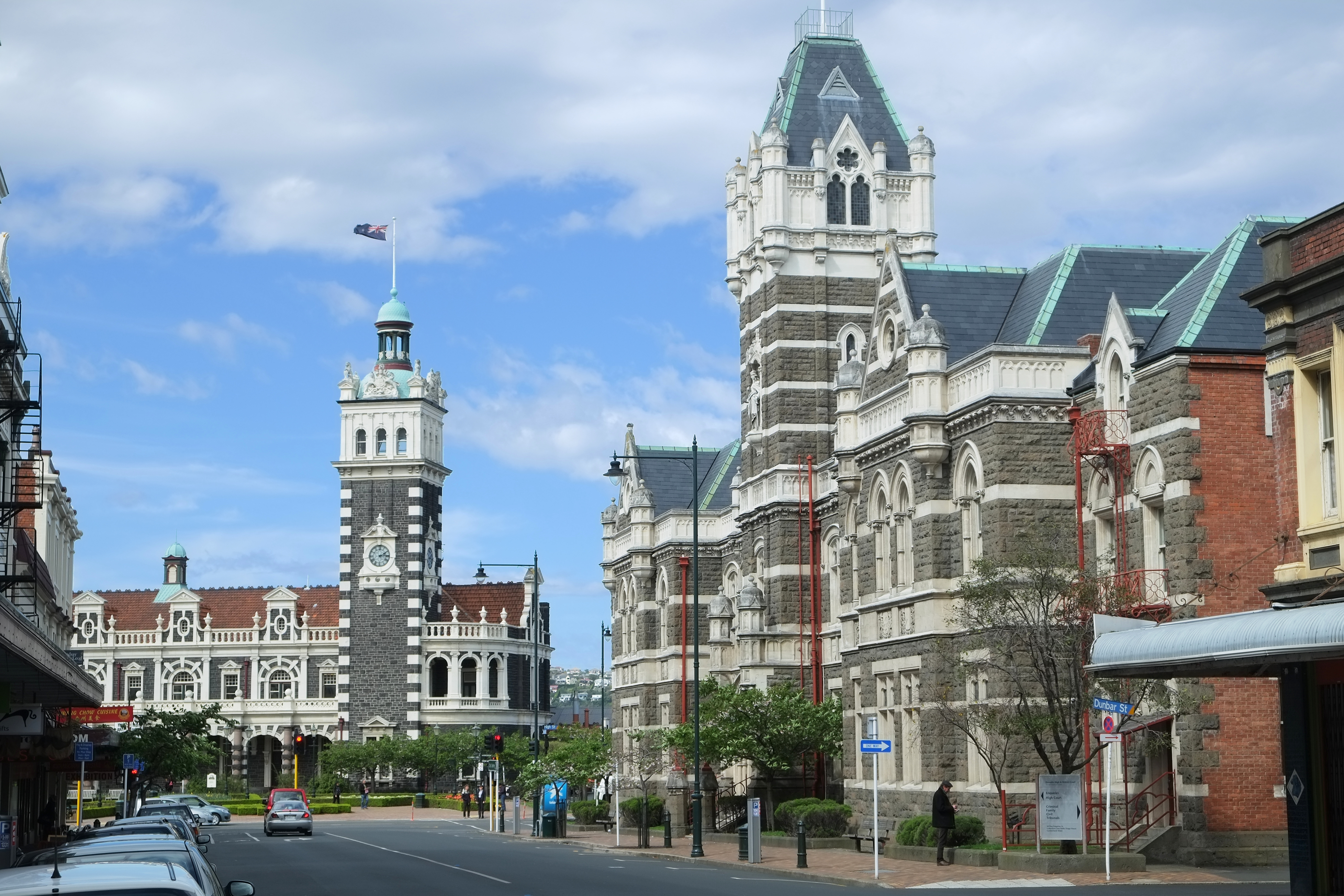
The Law Courts (right) and Dunedin Railway Station (left) from Lower Stuart Street

The Dunedin Law Courts is a notable historic building in central Dunedin, in the South Island of New Zealand. They are located at the corner of Lower Stuart Street and Anzac Square, directly opposite the city's historic railway station. Since 1902, the building has been used as the city's law courts, and contains four court rooms, including the ornate High Court, as well as housing the offices and library of the Law Society.

== Architecture ==
The Law Courts building was one of the first major works to be designed by Government architect John Campbell, and was built in 1901–02 at a cost of £20,000 and opened in April 1902. The Law Courts are located alongside the former Dunedin Central Police Station, another Campbell building, though in a completely different style. While the 1890s police station (which was actually the city's jail for most of its existence) was deliberately modelled in a Queen Anne style uncommon in New Zealand but designed to imitate London's New Scotland Yard (now the Norman Shaw Buildings), the Law Courts are in decorative but stern Victorian Gothic style similar to the buildings of Dunedin's University of Otago Registry Building.

As is common with many of Dunedin's more substantial historic structures (including the railway station opposite) the Law Courts are constructed of dark Port Chalmers breccia ornamented with lighter Oamaru stone, a local compacted limestone mined to the north of Dunedin, and is topped with a roof of slate and granite. The main entrance to the court sits at the foot of a short tower which is decorated with an un-blindfolded statue of Justice in Italian white marble.

== Historic precinct ==
The building has a category I classification on the New Zealand Historic Places Trust register of historic buildings. The courts, the railway station, the former police station, and the nearby Allied Press Building and buildings of the Toitū Otago Settlers Museum together form an impressive precinct close to the heart of the city, stretching south along the city's one-way street system (part of State Highway 1) to Queens Gardens and up Lower Stuart Street towards the city centre, The Octagon.

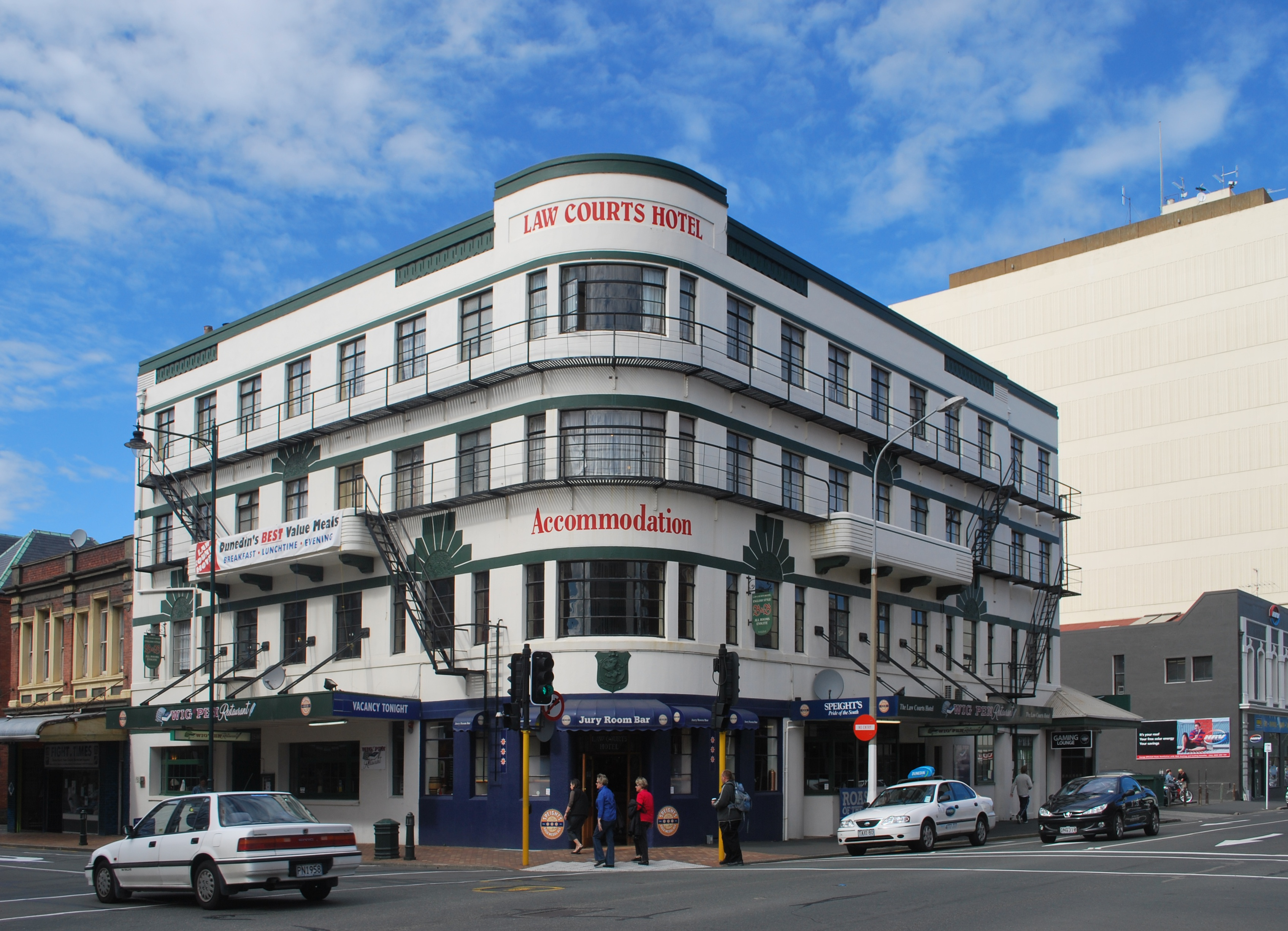
The Law Courts Hotel, an Art Deco building within the historic precinct

One of the city's most historic public houses and hostelries, the Law Courts Hotel, is located close to the courts in Lower Stuart Street, in a large Art Deco building (also listed by the Historic Places Trust, Category II) directly opposite the Allied Press Building (the offices of the city's main newspaper, the Otago Daily Times). The prime location of this hotel near these two premises has greatly contributed to its history, as has its longevity (having originally been founded as the Auld Scotland Hotel in 1863). It also led to the former name of the restaurant within the Law Courts Hotel ("The Wig and Pen"), which was a nod to its original regular clientele of lawyers and journalists.
