= 1872 Waikouaiti by-election =

New Zealand by-election

The 1872 Waikouaiti by-election was a by-election held on 12 June 1872 in the Waikouaiti electorate during the 5th New Zealand Parliament.

The by-election was caused by the resignation of the incumbent MP George McLean on 19 March 1872.

The by-election was won by David Monro. He addressed the electors thanking them for their support:

See for the names of those nominated:

== Results ==
The following table gives the election result (NB: Mr Thompson got 12 not 11 votes; from the Nelson Examiner subtotals by polling place):

1872 Waikouaiti by-election
Party	Candidate	Votes	%	±%
Independent	David Monro	232	69.46	
Independent	Dr Webster	58	17.37	
Independent	Mr J. Preston	44	13.17	
Independent	Mr D. Hutcheson	25	7.49	
Independent	Mr A. Thompson	12	3.59	
Independent	Mr W. H. Cutten	10	2.99	
Turnout		334		
Majority		174	8.09	
