= Kaikoura Star =

The Kaikoura Star is a newspaper established in 1880 to serve the Kaikōura community on the east coast of the South Island of New Zealand. Formerly printed in Kaikōura, it is now published weekly by Allied Media who are based in Dunedin.

== History ==
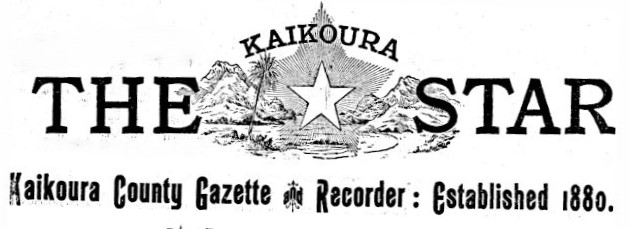
Masthead of the Kaikoura Star, 1904

The Kaikoura Star and North Canterbury and South Marlborough News was established by George Renner in 1880. Renner had previously edited other newspapers including the Bruce Herald, Mataura Ensign and Clutha Times. At first the four-page newspaper was published twice a week: it was described by the Matura Ensign as "an organ which sheds a lurid bi-weekly glare on a rising district in South Marlborough". The Kaikoura Star used a masthead featuring a star with mountains in the background. The company also undertook general printing work in Kaikōura.

The paper grew to eight pages by 1905, when Renner sold it to Wilfrid Beach Ingram and left Kaikōura for Pahiatua, where he and his son established a new newspaper called the Pahiatua Era. A year later Renner returned to the town and his sons Alfred and Cyril Frank Renner set up the Kaikoura Sun to rival the Kaikoura Star. In 1907 George Renner faced Ingram in court. Ingram claimed that according to their sale agreement for the Kaikoura Star, Renner was not permitted to compete with him in the journalistic field. He believed that Renner was writing for his sons' newspaper, but Renner stated that he was not being paid. Renner stated that he had actually sold the Kaikoura Star to his son Frank in 1900 and that he remained only as an unpaid editor, and the pair swore that there had been no agreement about not competing. Ingram won the case.

In 1910 Ingram sold the Kaikoura Star to Harold Flower. Flower bought the Kaikoura Sun from the Renner brothers and closed it down. The last issue was printed in January 1911.

Around 1918, Flower sold the Kaikoura Star to Albert Burton Clark, who edited and managed the paper for thirty years until shortly before his death in 1948. Clark's obituary stated that he was always keen to use the influence of his newspaper to help worthy causes, including agitating for electric lighting and a high pressure water supply for Kaikōura and supporting construction of the South Island Main Trunk railway. He incorporated the Cheviot News into the Kaikoura Star in 1924.

In 1946, Clark sold the newspaper to Frank Bernard Sabiston. Sabiston sold it in 1960 to Colin Ford, and it went through more several changes of ownership. In 1975 the paper ceased publication and for a few months was absorbed into the North Canterbury News. It was revived and taken over by Les Taylor. The Marlborough Express bought the Kaikoura Star in 1988.

Fairfax bought the Kaikoura Star in 2003 and closed the Kaikoura Star office in Kaikōura in 2016. By this time the newspaper was being published once a week. Fairfax's subsidiary Stuff maintained a Kaikōura-based reporter and continued to publish the Kaikoura Star until 2018, when it was sold to the Greymouth Evening Star Company because Stuff was refocussing its business on digital content. By 2021 the Kaikoura Star had become a weekly newspaper published by the Greymouth Star. As of 2026 it is still printed weekly, with a circulation of about 1,000 issues, by Allied Media, who as Allied Press gained a majority stake in the Greymouth Evening Star Company in 1991.
