= 1875 Waikouaiti by-election =

New Zealand by-election

The 1875 Waikouaiti by-election was a by-election held on 3 May 1875 in the Waikouaiti electorate during the 5th New Zealand Parliament.

The by-election was caused by the resignation of the incumbent MP John Lillie Gillies. The by-election was won by George McLean, who had represented the electorate in 1871–72. He was opposed by Francis Rich who had previously represented the electorate in 1869–70.

== Results ==
The following table gives the election result:

1875 Waikouaiti by-election
Party	Candidate	Votes	%	±%
Independent	George McLean	227	56.47	
Independent	Francis Rich	175	43.53	
Majority		52	12.94	
Turnout		402		
