= The Star (Christchurch) =

New Zealand newspaper

- Type: Weekly morning newspaper
- Owners: Star Media; Allied Media
- Editor-in-chief: Barry Clarke
- Founded: 14 May 1868
- Headquarters: Christchurch, New Zealand
- Circulation: 92,000
- Website: www.odt.co.nz/star-news/

The Star is a newspaper published in Christchurch, New Zealand, that was published daily from 1868 to 1991. It became the Christchurch Star-Sun in June 1935 after merging with a rival newspaper, The Sun, and at the time, it ceased daily publication. In 1991, it was known as The Christchurch Star. It later became a free newspaper, published twice a week (on Wednesdays and Fridays) until 2016, when it switched to being published once a week (on Thursdays).

== History ==
The Star was first published on 14 May 1868 as the evening edition of the Lyttelton Times. By 1914, the newspaper faced competition from two other Christchurch-based evening newspapers, The Sun and Evening Times. The rival Evening Times subsequently folded in 1917. During the Great Depression, rationalisation and competition led The Star to lower its price from 2d to 1d in November 1934, prompting other Christchurch dailies to follow suit. This price proved financially unsustainable and The Star raised its orice back to 2d in June 1935.

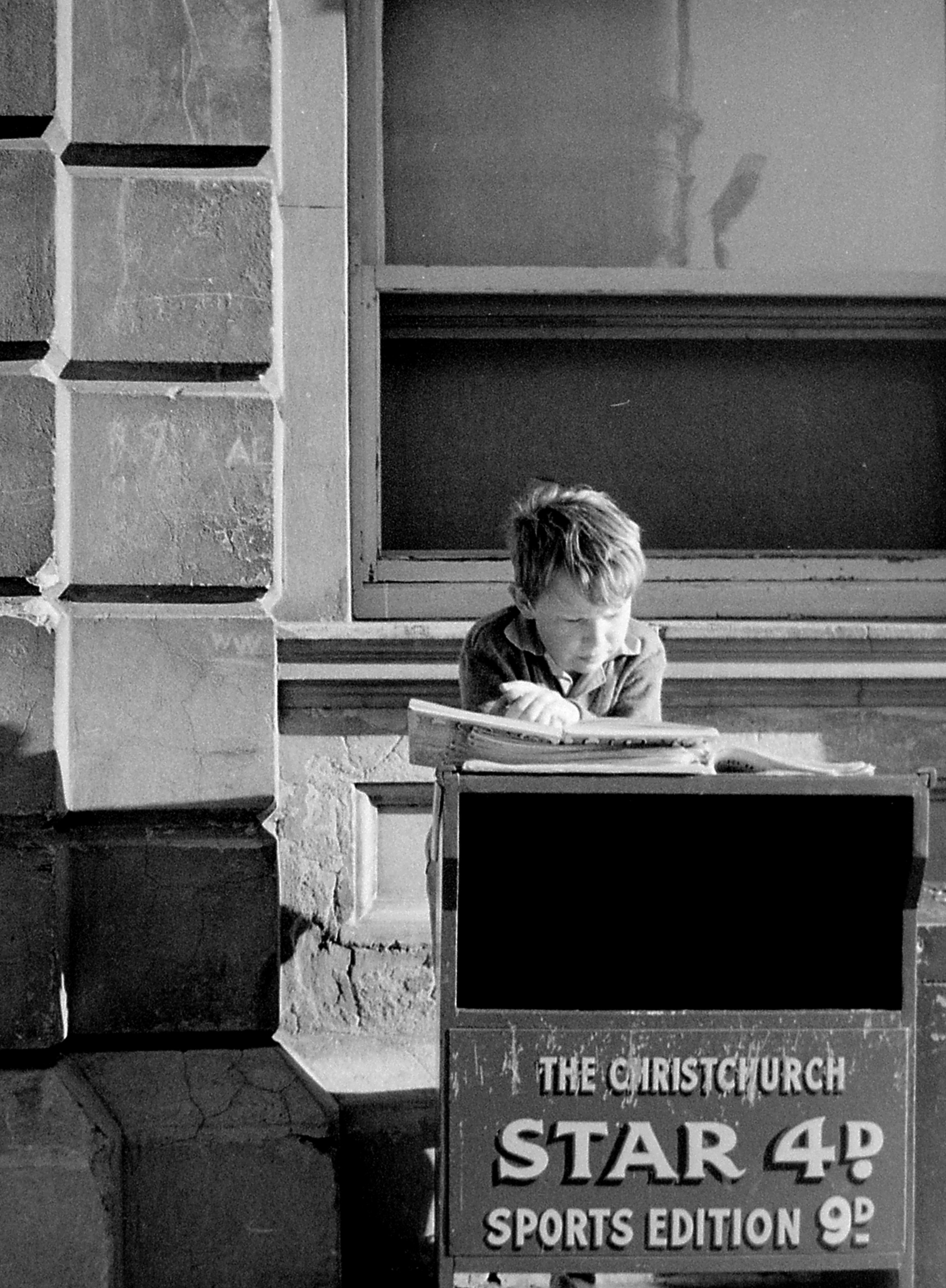
A newsboy selling The Star in 1967

In June 1935 New Zealand Newspapers Ltd, the parent company of The Star and The Christchurch Times (the successor to the Lyttelton Times), purchased The Sun and agreed to cease publication of Christchurch Times. Later that month, The Star and The Sun merged to form a new newspaper called the Christchurch Star-Sun, which became the city's sole evening daily newspaper and competitor to the morning daily newspaper The Press. The newspaper's title changed several times until it ceased publication in 1991. The Star was subsequently revived as a bi-weekly community newspaper.

On 13 July 2012, The Star along with several regional newspapers including the Oamaru Mail was amalgamated into W & H Newspapers Limited.

In April 2013 the Star was sold by APN New Zealand Media (owners of The New Zealand Herald) to Mainland Media. Mainland Media was owned by Pier and Charlotte Smulders, and chaired by Nick Smith, the director of the Dunedin–based media company Allied Press. Smith had previously worked as an advertising cadet for The Star in 1965. Mainland Media was subsequently renamed The Christchurch Star Company Limited on 29 July 2013.

In August 2018, Allied Press acquired The Star's owners Star Media and its stable of community newspapers, magazines, digital platforms, and events. Following the acquisition, Charlotte Smulders remained the company's magazine publisher. Allied Press' acquisition of Star Media allowed the subsidiary to offer package buys combining the Canterbury Region with other South Island markets.

== Controversies ==
In 1991, The Star featured in the film JFK, with the claim that the 23 November 1963 edition of the Star, shown in the film, had published details of Lee Harvey Oswald which the Star could only have had access to if they were pre-packaged before the assassination. The paper's chief reporter later said that this was simply wrong, as Oswald had been arrested at around 10 am New Zealand time, and the Star was not published until early to mid-afternoon New Zealand time. With access to US wire services that had photographs and biographical details from Oswald's prior defection to and return from the Soviet Union, a front page was drawn up in the time available.

In 2020, The Star faced criticism for advertising propaganda defending the Chinese Communist Party’s policies such as the Xinjiang re-education camps. The Star defended their continued publication of these advertisements, as it sees them as expressions of “free speech”. In response, University of Canterbury political scientist Anne-Marie Brady raised concerns that these advertisements were not making clear distinctions between opinion and fact.
