= Greymouth Star =

Daily newspaper published in Greymouth, New Zealand

- Type: Daily (except Sunday) newspaper
- Format: Broadsheet
- Owner: Allied Media
- Founded: 1866
- Headquarters: Greymouth, New Zealand
- Circulation: 4,333
- Website: greystar.co.nz

The Greymouth Star, formerly the Greymouth Evening Star, is a daily newspaper published in Greymouth and circulated on the West Coast of New Zealand's South Island from Westport to Haast.

== History ==
The Greymouth Evening Star was one of many newspapers founded on the West Coast during the West Coast gold rush. It is New Zealand's sixth oldest daily newspaper and was founded by James Snyder Browne as a four-page daily on 18 March 1866. An evening newspaper, its main competitors was the Grey River Argus founded in 1865 (folded in 1966) and issued as a morning newspaper. The Grey River Argus was owned by labour movement interests and published by James Kerr. In contrast, the Greymouth Evening Star took a conservative stance and there was an ongoing rivalry between the papers through their editorials.

The Greymouth Evening Star celebrated 125 years in 1991 and in the same year Dunedin media company Allied Press purchased a majority shareholding. In 2006, the newspaper changed its name from Greymouth Evening Star to Greymouth Star.

== Sister publications ==
- Hokitika Guardian: Monday to Friday morning newspaper in Hokitika, first published in 1865. Formerly known as The West Coast Times.
- West Coast Messenger: a free newspaper printed every Wednesday and distributed throughout the West Coast between Karamea, Haast and Murchison.
- Kaikoura Star: a weekly subscriber paper. Purchased by the Greymouth Star in May 2018.
