= Garrick Tremain =

New Zealand cartoonist and painter (1941–2025)

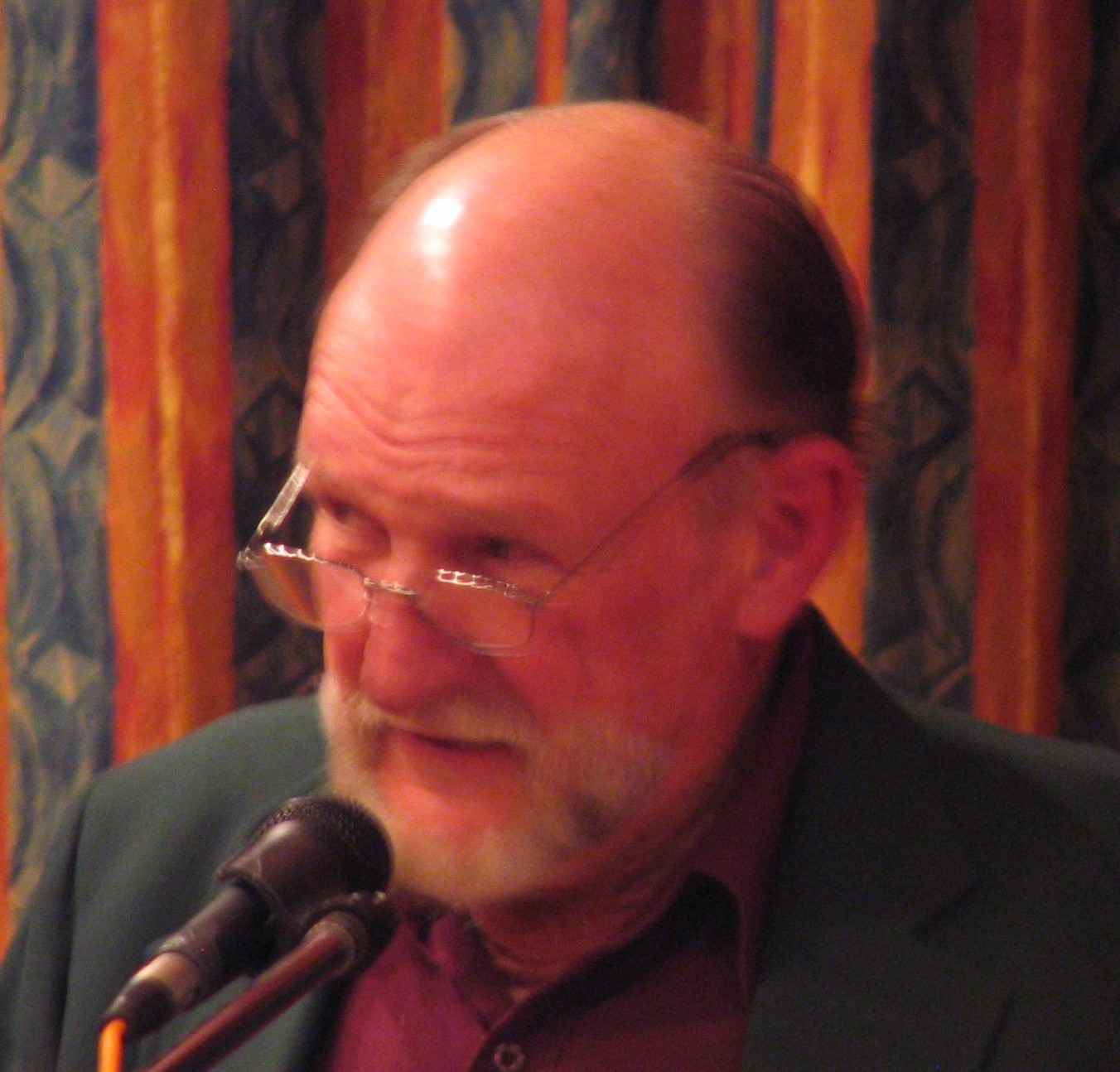
Tremain speaking at the Dunedin Public Library in 2008

Garrick Tremain (1941 – 27 December 2025) was a New Zealand cartoonist and painter who lived in Queenstown.

== Life and career ==
Tremain was a professional painter from 1972 and a cartoonist from 1988. He produced a cartoon six or seven days a week for various New Zealand newspapers, including the Otago Daily Times, apart from a few months of semi-retirement from February 2007 when he produced weekly cartoons.

He was a finalist for the Qantas Media Awards for cartoons in 2000 and 2004.

Tremain died at Lakes District Hospital in Queenstown on 27 December 2025 at the age of 84.

=== Controversy ===
On 3 December 2019 the Otago Daily Times published a cartoon by Tremain making light of the measles epidemic in Samoa. At that point the epidemic had killed 53 people, almost exclusively small children. Many people questioned how a cartoonist could think this an appropriate subject for a cartoon, and also why the editor allowed it to be published. Some of Tremain's colleagues at the Otago Daily Times spoke out against the publication of the cartoon. The Race Race Relations Commissioner, Meng Foon, called the cartoon a "slap in the face" for the victims' families.

The public response to the cartoon led to an apology by the Otago Daily Times the same day. The editor, Barry Stewart, said that "The content and timing of the cartoon were insensitive, and we apologise without reservation for publishing it."

On 4 December, Tremain apologised for his lack of judgment but also referred to the cartoon as a "light-hearted joke" and said he "saw nothing wrong with it". Protestors outside the ODT offices called for Tremain to be fired and Stewart to step down. The editor said that Tremain's position with the paper was under review and he would not be published again until the review was complete.

Tremain had previously been accused of "playing with outdated and bigoted stereotypes". On 23 December, the New Zealand Media Council ruled that Tremain's cartoon was "gratuitously hurtful and discriminatory". The council had received 130 complaints in response to Tremain's "Samoan measles" cartoon.

== Selected bibliography ==
- Nursery Rhymes Mother Never Read You (2005) ISBN 0-908629-62-1
- 20 years of Garrick Tremain (2008) ISBN 978-1-86966-229-5
