= 1873 Waikouaiti by-election =

New Zealand by-election

The 1873 Waikouaiti by-election was a by-election held on 23 July 1873 in the Waikouaiti electorate during the 5th New Zealand Parliament.

The by-election was caused by the resignation of the incumbent MP David Monro.

Candidates for the by-election were John Lillie Gillies, Thomas Slater Pratt, and John Graham. Pratt had been mayor of Waikouaiti since July 1870. Gillies was Speaker of the Provincial Council at the time.

The by-election was won by Gillies.

== Results ==
The following table gives the election result:

1873 Waikouaiti by-election
Party	Candidate	Votes	%	±%
Independent	John Lillie Gillies	163	63.67	
Independent	T. R. Pratt	93	36.33	
Majority		70	27.34	
Turnout		256		
