= Julian Smith (publisher) =

New Zealand businessman

Sir Julian Smith KNZM OBE
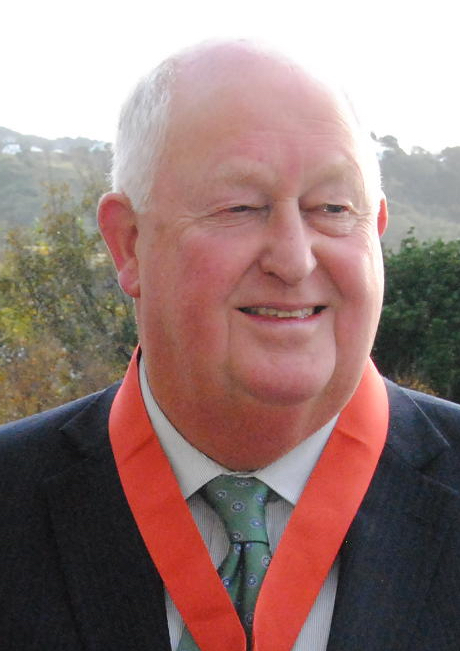
- Smith in 2013
- Born: Julian Stanley Smith; 29 October 1943 (age 83); Dunedin, New Zealand
- Occupation: Publisher

Sir Julian Stanley Smith KNZM OBE (born 29 October 1943) is a New Zealand businessman and one-time publisher of the Otago Daily Times (ODT) and director of Allied Media. Smith is the fifth generation of his family to run the paper.

== Early life and education ==
Born in Dunedin on 29 October 1943, Smith was educated at John McGlashan College followed by the University of Otago.

== Career ==
In 1974, he joined the board of the Evening Star Company Limited, which later merged with the Otago Daily Times to form Allied Press, which later merged with John M. Fraser & Co Ltd to form Otago Press and Produce (OPP). In 1986, Smith and other members of the management bought OPP and reconstituted Allied Press. Allied Press' assets consist of the Otago Daily Times, several local community and farming newspapers, and Channel 39. In 2016, Smith announced his retirement from the day-to-day running of the ODT.

== Honours ==
Smith has had the Smith Gallery at Toitū Otago Settlers Museum named after him.

In the 1994 Queen's Birthday Honours, Smith was appointed an Officer of the Order of the British Empire, for services to business management and the community. In the 2013 New Year Honours, he was made a Knight Companion of the New Zealand Order of Merit, for services to business.
