= Whitely King =

Australian union buster

John Whiteley King (22 February 1857 – 21 December 1905), commonly known as Whitely King, was General Secretary of the Pastoralists' Union of New South Wales and its successor, the Graziers' Association of New South Wales, from its inception in 1890 to 1901. He was responsible, among other duties, for enforcing pay and conditions for shearers, on behalf of the owners, and supported the owners against the unionists during several strikes by recruiting non-union "scab" labour.

== History ==
King was born in Auckland, New Zealand, the elder son of Belgrave Theodore King and Sarah Hannah King née Whiteley. In 1858 his father deserted his family, (Note: Belgrave Theodore King changed his name to Byron Thomas Kemble, and found employment in Tenterfield, New South Wales, as an auctioneer. He was appointed magistrate and coroner.) His wife married again, and King was raised by his grandparents, Rev. John Whiteley (1806–1869) and Mary Ann Whiteley née Cooke in New Plymouth. He became a journalist in Gore, Invercargill. He founded the Mataura Ensign in 1880, then was editor and part proprietor of the Taranaki News in New Plymouth, and later editor of the Marlborough Daily Times. Around 1890 he left for Australia to manage the New Zealand Press Association's Sydney office.

He won the job of secretary at the foundation of the Pastoralists Union of New South Wales in July 1890, and was an effective organiser of non-union labour and promoter of the owners' arguments in the shearers' strike of the 1890s.

According to the Freeman's Journal, King's "loyalty to his masters and lack of sympathy for the workers, his almost cynical reliance upon "freedom of contract" as the solution to shearing shed discontent, prolonged the strike unnecessarily.

In March 1891 he co-founded (with A. W. Pearse and others) the Australasian Pastoralists' Review, edited by R. E. N. Twopeny.

== Last Days ==
He was forced to retire after a serious illness, reportedly syphilis, from which he largely recovered.

He died at Gladesville Hospital, Sydney, and his remains were buried in Gore Hill Cemetery, North Sydney.

== Personal ==
King married Esther Barham at Wellington, New Zealand on 26 May 1885. They had one daughter and three sons.

He died at Gladesville Hospital, Sydney. His remains were buried in Gore Hill Cemetery, North Sydney.

== In Australian folklore ==
As part of his union-busting tactics, King enjoined large numbers of unemployed men with no bush experience to head for the shearing sheds. The makeshift billycans affected by some of these travellers, fashioned from a jam tin and a length of wire for a handle, were dubbed "Whitely Kings", also used as an adjective.

He is mentioned in the folk song "The Shearer and the Rouseabout" by Joe Watson and the poem "Saint Peter" by Henry Lawson (later adapted into a folk song by Peter Duggan).
