= The Timaru Courier =

The Courier, also known as the Timaru Courier, is an A3 tabloid community newspaper delivered free to 27,000 homes every Thursday in the Timaru and South Canterbury area of New Zealand's South Island. It is published by Allied Media.
