= Channel 39 (New Zealand) =

- Broadcast area: Otago and Southland, New Zealand

Programming
- Picture format: PAL

Ownership
- Owner: Allied Press

History
- Launched: 1995
- Closed: 2023
- Former names: Channel 9, Dunedin Television

Links
- Website: Official Site

Channel 39, also known as Southern Television (and formerly Dunedin Television and Channel 9), was a regional television station operating in Dunedin, New Zealand. The channel was a division of Allied Press, who also publish the local daily newspaper Otago Daily Times. In December 2023, it was announced that Channel 39 would close by Christmas 2023.

== History ==
Channel 39 first commenced transmission in 1995 as a tourism station. In 1997 the station was expanded into a news-carrying local station called Channel 9. In 2003, the channel underwent a reorientation of strategy to focus on local news and became a division of Allied Press.

In March 2013, Channel 9 was rebranded as Dunedin Television when New Zealand switched to digital television. In addition, the channel's broadcast channel was changed to Freeview HD Channel 39. The station's chief executive Daryl Clarkson said that company had chosen the name Channel 39 "because it included the number nine and would hold the heritage of Channel 9." Channel 39 also entered into partnerships with local organisations including the Dunedin City Council. On 1 September 2016, Channel 39 extended its coverage to include Invercargill and adopted the name "Southern Television."

Between 24 March 1981 and 9 September 2016, the channel's owner Allied Press had registered the name Southern Television as an incorporated subsidiary with the New Zealand Companies Office.

On 13 December 2023, Stuff reported that Channel 39 would be closed by Christmas 2023 due to declining funding from New Zealand on Air, low viewership figures for its flagship programme The South Today, rising costs, and diminishing advertiser support. In early December 2023, Channel 39 ceased broadcasting its Invercargill television transmission. On 14 December, the Otago Daily Times reported that Allied Press had started a proposal to close Channel 39 by 22 December. Allied Press confirmed that The South Today brand would continue on the Otago Daily Times's website and YouTube.

== Facilities ==
As a division of Allied Press, Channel 39 had an office at the company's headquarters in Stuart Street and also operates a branch office in Invercargill. The channel operates a live-to-air studio and small production house. They also produce commercials and short programmes. Channel 39 also works with outside broadcast facilities to facilitate the broadcast of local and sporting events in Dunedin and Invercargill.

=== Live events ===
39 Southern Television had an Outside Broadcast unit. The purpose built van provided flexibility to cover local events live on air from various locations around Dunedin. The Outside Broadcast (OB) facility had been built by technical staff at Allied Press and was first used to broadcast the Dunedin Santa Parade live on television on December 4, 2005.

The mobile unit was fitted out as a purpose built portable studio complete with digital video mixer, graphics capability, sound and editing facilities. It could also accommodate up to six cameras, and be run single handed or with multiple crews. The unit could be powered by 240 volts or run from its own self-contained power supply for maximum flexibility.

== Local programmes ==
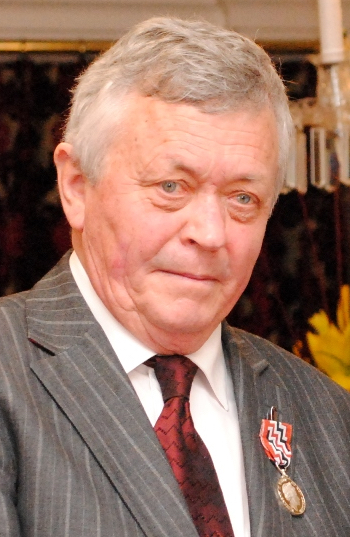
Dougal Stevenson, the host of Channel 39's Dunedin Diary programme.

39 Southern Television provided a 24-hour schedule and a core of locally focused primetime viewing. The programming included its flagship locally produced The South Today, Southern Newsweek, Dunedin Diary, Scarfie Land, Southern Attractions, local sports and event coverage as well as programming from local, national and international partners.

=== The South Today ===
The South Today was a half-hour live television news that was broadcast daily at 5:30pm, with repeat transmissions at 7pm and 9:30pm. The programme was funded by New Zealand On Air.

By December 2023, Stuff reported that The South Today was reporting low viewership figures of a few hundred for videos on its YouTube channel. Despite plans to close Channel 39 by Christmas 2023, Allied Press confirmed that The South Today brand would continue on the Otago Daily Times's website and YouTube with some format changes. However, the daily half hour news bulletins would be halted.

=== Southern Newsweek ===
Southern Newsweek was a roundup of the weeks news from Dunedin, consisting of stories from the weekly news broadcasts.

=== Dunedin Diary ===
Dunedin Diary is a weekly current affairs, lifestyle and arts magazine show hosted by veteran TVNZ 1 broadcaster Dougal Stevenson.

=== Scarfie Land ===
Scarfie Land was a showcase of student life in Dunedin with its roots are derived from COW (Campus Otago Weekly) TV. From 2015, it was replaced by a Facebook updates page. Broadcaster Clarke Gayford, who is now the husband of former New Zealand Prime Minister Jacinda Ardern pitched the COW TV to the station after graduating from the New Zealand Graduate School.

=== Sports ===
Channel 39's sports programme covered a range of sporting activities including rugby, football, ice hockey, cricket, motorsports cars and bikes.

=== Southern Attractions ===
Southern Attractions was a tourism programme aimed at visitors to Dunedin and the surrounding region, running from 7.39am to 10am, 3pm to 4pm, and from 6pm to 7pm on weekdays. It also ran at various times over the weekends.

=== Story Time ===
Storytime was a half-hour show hosted by Anita Cumming (who also briefly appeared in TVNZ's Shortland Street) and Merlin the Mouse aimed at preschoolers and young children.
