= Francis Rich =

New Zealand politician

New Zealand Parliament
Years	Term	Electorate	Party
1869–1870	4th	Waikouaiti	Independent

Francis Dyer Rich (1828 – 5 December 1901) was a 19th-century Member of the New Zealand Parliament for Otago, New Zealand.

Rich represented the Waikouaiti electorate from the 1869 by-election to 30 December 1870 when he retired.

He stood unsuccessfully for the electorate in 1875 by-election

He was an early settler in Auckland, then moving to Canterbury. He died at his family home Woodstock, Orariore near Cambridge and the Piako Swamp in the Waikato.
