= Waikouaiti (electorate) =

Waikouaiti was a parliamentary electorate in the Otago region of New Zealand, from 1866 to 1908.

== Population centres ==
The electorate is named after the township of Waikouaiti, which is close to the Waikouaiti River.

== History ==
The Waikouaiti electorate was formed for the 1866 election. William Murison was elected as the first representative, narrowly beating later Premier Julius Vogel; Vogel stood some weeks later in the Gold Fields electorate and was successful there. Murison resigned in 1868. The resulting 1868 by-election was won by Robert Mitchell, who in turn resigned before the end of the term in the following year. He was succeeded by Francis Rich, who won the 1869 by-election and served until the end of the term in 1870, when he retired.

George McLean won the 1871 election and resigned again in the following year. McLean was succeeded by David Monro, who won the 1872 by-election and resigned one year later. Monro had been a member of all previous Parliaments. Monro was succeeded by John Lillie Gillies, who won the 1873 by-election and resigned in 1875. Gillies was succeeded by McLean, who successfully stood for re-election in the 1875 by-election. McLean was confirmed in the general elections of 1875 and 1879 election; he retired at the end of the parliamentary term in 1881.

James Green, who had previously represented Port Chalmers, succeeded McLean in the 1881 election. Green was defeated in the 1884 election by John Buckland. In the 1887 election, Buckland stood in Waihemo and was defeated there.

James Green was re-elected in 1887 in the Waikouaiti electorate and represented it for several terms until he was defeated in the 1896 election by Edmund Allen who stood for the Liberal Party. In the 1902 election, Allen successfully contested the Chalmers electorate.

Thomas Mackenzie was elected in the Waikouaiti electorate in 1902 and would represent it until the electorate's abolition in 1908, when he was elected for Taieri. Mackenzie would later become Prime Minister.

=== Members of Parliament ===
Waikouaiti was represented by ten Members of Parliament:

Key

Independent Liberal Independent Liberal

Election	Winner
1866 election	William Murison
1868 by-election	Robert Mitchell
1869 by-election	Francis Rich
1871 election	George McLean
1872 by-election	David Monro
1873 by-election	John Gillies
1875 by-election	George McLean
1875 election	George McLean
1879 election	George McLean
1881 election	James Green
1884 election	John Buckland
(electorate abolished, 1887-1893)
1893 election	James Green
1896 election	Edmund Allen
1899 election	Edmund Allen
1902 election	Thomas Mackenzie
1905 election	Thomas Mackenzie
(Electorate abolished 1908)

== Election results ==
=== 1899 election ===
1899 general election: Waikouaiti
Party	Candidate	Votes	%	±%
Liberal	Edmund Allen	1,749	55.24	
Conservative	John White	1,417	44.76	
Majority		332	10.49	
Turnout		3,166	74.37	
Registered electors		4,257		

=== 1875 by-election ===
1875 Waikouaiti by-election
Party	Candidate	Votes	%	±%
Independent	George McLean	227	56.47	
Independent	Francis Rich	175	43.53	
Majority		52	12.94	
Turnout		402		

=== 1873 by-election ===
1873 Waikouaiti by-election
Party	Candidate	Votes	%	±%
Independent	John Lillie Gillies	163	63.67	
Independent	T. R. Pratt	93	36.33	
Majority		70	27.34	
Turnout		256		

=== 1872 by-election ===
1872 Waikouaiti by-election
Party	Candidate	Votes	%	±%
Independent	David Monro	232	69.46	
Independent	Dr Webster	58	17.37	
Independent	Mr J. Preston	44	13.17	
Independent	Mr D. Hutcheson	25	7.49	
Independent	Mr A. Thompson	12	3.59	
Independent	Mr W. H. Cutten	10	2.99	
Turnout		334		
Majority		174	8.09	

=== 1868 by-election ===
1868 Waikouaiti by-election
Party	Candidate	Votes	%	±%
Independent	Robert Mitchell	119	51.97	
Independent	William Pitt Gordon	110	48.03	
Majority		9	3.93	
Turnout		229		

=== 1866 election ===
1866 general election: Waikouaiti
Party	Candidate	Votes	%	±%
Independent	William Murison	37	50.68	
Independent	Julius Vogel	35	47.95	
Independent	Andrew Thompson	1	1.37	
Majority		2	2.74	
Turnout		73	45.91	
Registered electors		159		
