= Millie Lovelock =

New Zealand singer and guitarist

- Also known as: Repulsive Woman
- Born: Millicent Ellen Lovelock; 1993 or 1994 (age 32–33)
- Origin: Dunedin, New Zealand
- Genre: Indie folk
- Occupation: Musician
- Instruments: Vocals; guitar; keyboards; cello
- Years active: 2010–present

Millicent Ellen Lovelock (born 1993 or 1994) is a singer-songwriter and guitarist from New Zealand who performs as Repulsive Woman. She was a member of Dunedin bands, Astro Children (2010–2017, 2019) and Trick Mammoth (2013–2015). As Repulsive Woman she released her debut album, Relief, in June 2019. Late that year Lovelock relocated to Manchester. Relief won the Best Independent Debut Award at the 2020 Taite Music Prize award ceremony.

== Biography ==
Lovelock started her musical career in Dunedin. At four or five years old she started to learn violin but does not consider herself to be proficient, and had been taught guitar by her father from the age of 13. Later she was classically trained in violin and clarinet. Her early performances included cover versions of pop boy band, One Direction. Lovelock on guitar and vocals founded Astro Children in 2010, with fellow school friend, Isaac Hickey on drums. The alt-pop, shoegaze duo's name references "Astro Zombies" by the Misfits. One venue they played at was The Attic in George Street, Dunedin, which doubled as a recording studio. They recorded an extended play, Lick My Spaceship, at that venue, which was issued in October 2012. They provided their first music video for the EP's single, "The One We Start With", in June 2013. Their debut album, Proteus, was also recorded at Dunedin's Attic Studios and was released in that year.

While still in Astro Children, Lovelock joined indie pop group Trick Mammoth late in 2013, on vocals and guitar, alongside Adrian Ng on guitar and Sam Valentine on drums. Ng had produced Proteus for Astro Children and had formed Trick Mammoth in 2012 with his former school mate, Valentine. Lovelock was recorded on that group's debut album, Floristry (February 2014), for Fishrider Records. From late 2014 to March 2017 she was a student columnist for Otago Daily Times with her "A Situation Report". She also completed her master's degree in English studies at University of Otago with her thesis, "One Direction fans and the co-construction of identity". In her opinion column she addressed issues of sexism, cuts to humanities courses and concerns on the future for young women. Otago Daily Times' journalist Vaughan Elder reported that she was "so polarising" and that "predominantly older white men" took issue with her opinions.

Lovelock had adopted the stage name, Repulsive Woman, late in 2015, while still a member of Astro Children. Her honours dissertation was on Djuna Barnes and her 1936 novel, Nightwood. Lovelock's pseudonym is from Barnes' poetry collection, The Book of Repulsive Women (1915). As Repulsive Woman she recorded her cover versions of One Direction songs and progressed to writing her own material. Astro Children issued another EP, Plain and Fancy Killings (April 2016), which Undertheradar's Joon Yang noticed took the duo, "closer to a darker, sludgier, and post-punk lyrical and sonic territory." Repulsive Woman released her debut single of original material, "Relief", in mid-2017. During that year she had taught herself cello and then used the instrument for the single. Lovelock relocated to Berlin for 2018 where she studied at Red Bull Music Academy before returning to Dunedin.

Her debut album, Relief, was released in June 2019 and was supported by touring the country from May to July. Her backing band both for the album and the associated tour were Adelaide Dunn (also engineer and producer), Julie Dunn on bass guitar and Olive Butler on violin. Late that year Lovelock relocated to Manchester. Relief won the Best Independent Debut Award at the 2020 Taite Music Prize. The citation describes her album, "an elusive, guitar-driven exploration of self in the context of modern society. [Lovelock] uniquely crafts soothing melodies with intricate lyrics to convey inner-conflicts and societal pressures." While in Manchester she has recorded material for an EP, writing parts for bass guitar, guitar and strings, including recording violin parts on a MIDI keyboard.
