= Allied Media =

News publishing company based in Dunedin, New Zealand

- Type: Holding company
- Industry: Mass media
- Headquarters: Dunedin, New Zealand
- Key people: Julian Smith (owner); Grant McKenzie (CEO)
- Products: Newspaper; Magazine; Digital
- Divisions: Star Media
- Website: alliedmedia.co.nz

Allied Media (formerly Allied Press) is an independent New Zealand media and publishing company based in Dunedin. The company's main asset is the Otago Daily Times, New Zealand's oldest daily newspaper. Allied Press has a number of other daily and community newspapers and commercial printing operations throughout the South Island including the Canterbury–based media company Star Media. It also formerly operated Dunedin's regional television station, Channel 39. In July 2025, it began trading as Allied Media, combining both Allied Press and Star Media under one brand.

== History ==
=== 20th century ===
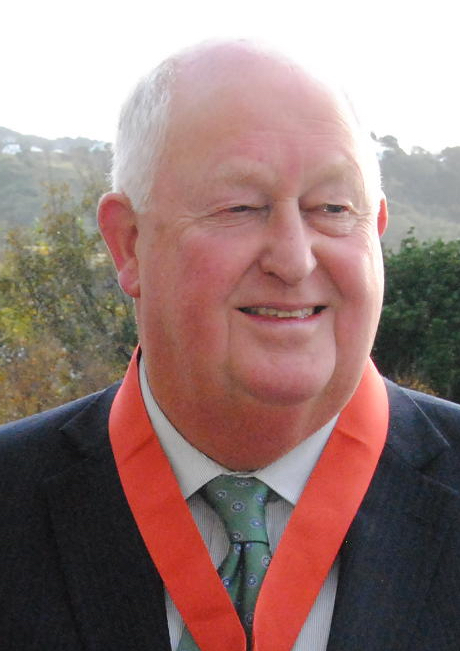
Julian Smith, Allied Press' chairman and management director.

Allied Press was formed through the merger of two Dunedin newspaper companies, the Otago Daily Times (ODT) and the former Evening Star, on 13 May 1975. The merger process was completed during the rest of the year following shareholder approval and other required agreements. ODT staff subsequently shifted into the Evening Star's building. The Evening Star subsequently ceased operations on 3 November 1979 and was replaced by a weekly newspaper called The Star. Hal Masters became the company's first chairman while the ODT manager Frank Dickson and Vic Cavanagh served as joint managing directors.

In 1979, the Christchurch–based H.W. Smith and the tourism company Mount Cook Group attempted separate takeover bids of Allied Press by buying up shares. In response, the businessman Sir Julian Smith merged Allied Press with his company John M. Fraser and Co Ltd to form a new privately listed company called Otago Press and Produce Limited (OPP). OPP was active in egg and poultry distribution, fruit and producer markets, building supplies, and real estate. The new company was led by chairman T.C. (Tom) Fraser and Deputy Chair Julian Smith, the former managing director of John M. Fraser and Co. In 1986, Smith purchased Otago Press and Produce, reestablishing Allied Press Ltd as a private business. Smith became Allied Press' principal shareholder, chairman and managing director while his brother Nick became a substantial shareholder, director and business manager.

=== 21st century ===
Former logo of Allied Press until 2025.

In July 2015, Allied Press acquired The Oamaru Mail.

On 12 June 2016, Julian Smith stepped down as managing director of Allied Press. Grant McKenzie, the Dunedin City Council's financial officer and the former director of the University of Otago's financial services, was appointed as the company's chief executive officer. While Smith remains the chairman of the company, McKenzie took over the running of Allied Press.

Besides the Otago Daily Times, Allied Press acquired a majority stake in the Greymouth Evening Star in 1991, which it renamed the Greymouth Star in 2006. The company also owns a range of community and farming newspapers through the South Island including North Canterbury News, the Ashburton Courier, The Timaru Courier, The Oamaru Mail, Lakes District and Central Otago News, Mountain Scene, The Star and The Ensign. In 2018, Allied Press acquired the Clutha Leader from Stuff.

In August 2018, Allied Press acquired the Canterbury media company Star Media, which owned a stable of community newspapers, magazines, and events including the Christchurch–based The Star. Star Media's chairman Nick Smith also served as Allied Press' director and had previously worked for The Star as their advertising cadet. Star Media subsequently became a subsidiary of Allied Press.

During the outbreak of the COVID-19 pandemic in New Zealand, Allied Press maintained the print circulation of the Otago Daily Times as well as its websites but suspended the circulation of its community and farming newspapers on 25 March 2020 to comply with lockdown restrictions. In April 2020, Allied Press launched a major project to upgrade its Dunedin printing press. By 14 May 2020, the Government had eased lockdown restrictions, allowing Allied Press' community newspapers and magazines to resume operations.

Following the Delta variant community outbreak in August 2021, Allied Press continued publishing the Otago Daily Times and most of its community papers. However, it suspended publication of the Southland Express (Invercargill), the Cromwell Bulletin, The Star (Christchurch), and Christchurch community papers due to lockdown restrictions.

In October 2023, 40 journalists and 65 editorial and print distribution staff affiliated with the E tū union staged a 24 hour strike to demand that their wages be raised to industry pay rates. The unionised staff rejected a pay offer by Allied Press.

In December 2023, Allied Press confirmed that it would close its broadcasting arm Channel 39 by Christmas 2023 due to declining funding from New Zealand on Air, low viewership figures for its flagship programme The South Today, rising costs, and declining advertiser support. However, The South Today brand would continue on the Otago Daily Times's website and YouTube.

In 2024, Allied Press acquired the Blenheim Sun. On 30 July 2025, Allied Press began trading as Allied Media, combining both Allied Press and Star Media under one brand.

== Organisation and assets ==
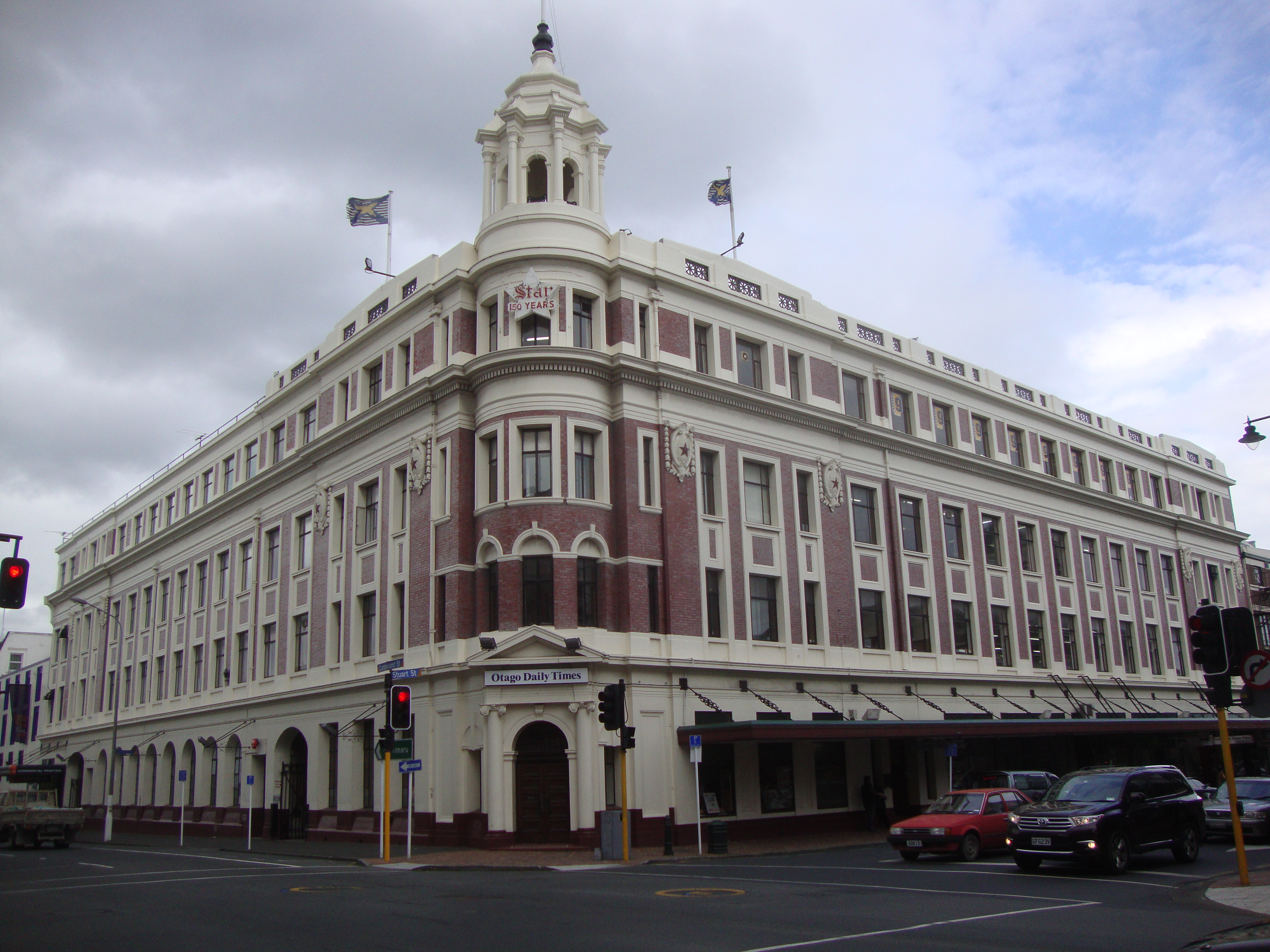
The Allied Press headquarters on Lower Stuart Street.

=== Management ===
Allied Media is owned by Sir Julian Smith, who serves as its chairman, managing director and board member. Other key members of the company's leadership team include Allied Media board members Nick Smith and Ray Clarkson, CEO Grant McKenzie, editor-in-chief Paul McIntyre, chief information technological officer Timo Janssen, magazines publisher Charlotte Smith-Smulders, commercial manager Matthew Holdridge, human resources manager Jodi Parrish, media project manager James Smith, northern regional manager Steve McCaughan and operations manager Raja Chakrabarti. The company has more than 400 employees.

=== Headquarters and bureaus ===
Allied Media has its headquarters in an imposing building in Lower Stuart Street, Dunedin. The building was formerly the home of Dunedin's The Evening Star prior to its amalgamation with the Otago Daily Times in 1979. The building was designed by Edmund Anscombe and built in the late 1920s and is part of a historic precinct that also includes the Dunedin Law Courts and Dunedin Railway Station. It is listed as a Category II Historic Place.

Allied Media also operates 13 regional offices throughout the South Island including Alexandra, Ashburton, Balclutha, Blenheim, Christchurch, Cromwell, Gore, Invercargill, Oamaru, Queenstown, Rangiora, Timaru, and Wānaka.

== Brands and publications ==
Allied Media's flagship publication is the daily newspaper Otago Daily Times. It also owns a majority stake in the Greymouth Star along with a range of South Island community and farming newspapers. Allied Media operates 28 newspapers, five magazines and 15 newspaper inserts. It also runs three events called City 2 Surf (Christchurch), the Home and Leisure Show (Christchurch) and Rural Champions.

In 2018, Allied Press acquired the Christchurch-based media company Star Media, which owned The Star (Christchurch) community newspaper. In July 2025, Star Media and Allied Press were combined under a single brand called Allied Media. Until late December 2023, Allied Press also operated a local television station called Channel 39.

=== Newspapers ===
- Ashburton Courier
- Bay Harbour News
- Blenheim Sun
- Canterbury Rural Life
- Clutha Leader
- Cromwell Bulletin
- The Ensign (Gore)
- The Geraldine News
- Greymouth Star
- Hokitika Guardian
- Kaikoura Star
- Mountain Scene
- The News (Central Otago) (Alexandra)
- Nor'West News
- Oamaru Mail
- Otago Daily Times
- Pegaus Post
- Selwyn Times
- Southern Rural Life
- Southern View (newspaper)
- Southland Express (Invercargill)
- The Star (Christchurch)
- The Star (Dunedin)
- The Timaru Courier (Timaru)
- Wanaka Sun
- The West Coast Messenger
- West Coast Rural Life
- Western News (Christchurch)

=== Magazines ===
- O3: The South Island Lifestyle Magazine
- Kiwi Gardener
- Kiwi Gardener Quarterly
- NZ Classic Driver
- Rugby News

=== Newspaper inserts ===
- Build, Buy Renovate
- Christmas Gift Guide
- Design for Living
- Drive South
- Explore Dunedin
- Fresh
- Healthcare Providers
- Holiday
- Lifestyles
- Property Times
- Property Today
- Rural Champions
- South
- The Weekend Mix
- Wedding Guide

== Bibliography ==
- Palenski, Ron (2019). The Star of the South: A history of the Evening Star newspaper. Dunedin: Allied Press. ISBN 9780473484446.
