= Robert Mitchell (New Zealand politician) =

New Zealand politician

New Zealand Parliament
Years	Term	Electorate	Party
1868–1869	4th	Waikouaiti	Independent

Robert Mitchell was a 19th-century Member of Parliament from Otago, New Zealand.

In 1864, Mitchell was chosen as one of the wardens for the Hawkesbury district. In 1865, Mitchell was one of the promoters of an Agricultural and Pastoral Association for the Waikouaiti district, covering the same area as the Waikouaiti electorate.

He represented the Waikouaiti electorate from the 1868 by-election to 1869 when he resigned.
