= George McLean (New Zealand politician) =

New Zealand politician

Sir George McLean (1834 – 17 February 1917) was a 19th-century Member of Parliament from the Otago region in New Zealand.

== Biography ==
New Zealand Parliament
Years	Term	Electorate	Party
1871–1872	5th	Waikouaiti	Independent
1875	5th	Waikouaiti	Independent
1875–1879	6th	Waikouaiti	Independent
1879–1881	7th	Waikouaiti	Independent

McLean owned Matanaka Farm near Waikouaiti from February 1878 until 1892.

He represented the Waikouaiti electorate from 1871 to 1872 when he resigned, and from an 1875 by-election to 1881 when he retired.

McLean held several ministerial appointments under Vogel and Atkinson: Postmaster-General and Commissioner of Telegraphs from 1 to 13 September 1876 and 12 January to 13 October 1877. He was Collector of Customs from 1 September 1876 to 13 October 1877 and (as a MLC) Commissioner of Trade and Customs from 28 August to 3 September 1884.

On 19 December 1881, he was appointed to the New Zealand Legislative Council and remained a member until his death on 17 February 1917.

He was knighted in 1909. He had married a daughter of Matthew Holmes. His daughter Georgia Constance McLean married Thomas Wilford in 1892. His brother-in-law, the solicitor John White, unsuccessfully contested the Waikouaiti electorate in the 1899 election.

Political offices
Preceded by Julius Vogel	Postmaster-General and Commissioner of Telegraphs; 1876; 1877	Succeeded by Frederick Whitaker
Preceded by John Davies Ormond	Postmaster-General and Commissioner of Telegraphs; 1876; 1877	Succeeded by James Temple Fisher
