= William Murison =

New Zealand politician and cricketer

William Dick Murison (24 February 1837 – 28 December 1877) was a 19th-century New Zealand Member of Parliament, journalist and cricketer.

== Biography ==
New Zealand Parliament
Years	Term	Electorate	Party
1866–1868	4th	Waikouaiti	Independent

Murison was born in Alyth in Perthshire, Scotland in 1837 and educated at Royal High School in Edinburgh before emigrating to Otago in New Zealand in 1856. He played three first-class cricket matches for Otago between the 1864–65 and 1866–67 seasons, scoring a total of 29 runs in the first three first-class matches to be played in New Zealand.

He represented the Waikouaiti electorate from 1866, when he narrowly defeated Julius Vogel, to 1868, when he resigned. From 1871 until his death in 1877, he was editor of the Otago Daily Times.

He died on 28 December 1877 in Dunedin, aged 40. He left a wife and five children.
