= John Lillie Gillies =

New Zealand politician (1832–1897)

New Zealand Parliament
Years	Term	Electorate	Party
1873–1875	5th	Waikouaiti	Independent

John Lillie Gillies (1832 – 27 September 1897) was a 19th-century Member of Parliament from the Otago region of New Zealand. He was from Rothesay, Bute on the Isle of Bute, Scotland.

Gillies was a member of the Otago Provincial Council, representing the Tokomairiro electorate from 10 October 1861 until 16 August 1864, when he resigned. He then represented the electorate from 5 February 1869 until the abolition of provincial government in 1876, with the electorate changing names in 1871 to Milton. Gillies was twice a member of the executive council: from 16 September 1863 to 17 May 1864, and from 6 May 1869 to 13 April 1871. He was speaker of the provincial council from May 1871 until the abolition of the provinces.

He represented the Waikouaiti electorate in the House of Representatives from 1873 to 1875, when he resigned.

He was Secretary to the Harbour Board when he died aged 65 years, and had been Provincial Treasurer of the Otago Provincial Council.

He was the brother of Thomas Gillies and Robert Gillies, and was the brother-in-law of James McIndoe.
