= Otago Daily Times =

Daily newspaper published in Dunedin, New Zealand

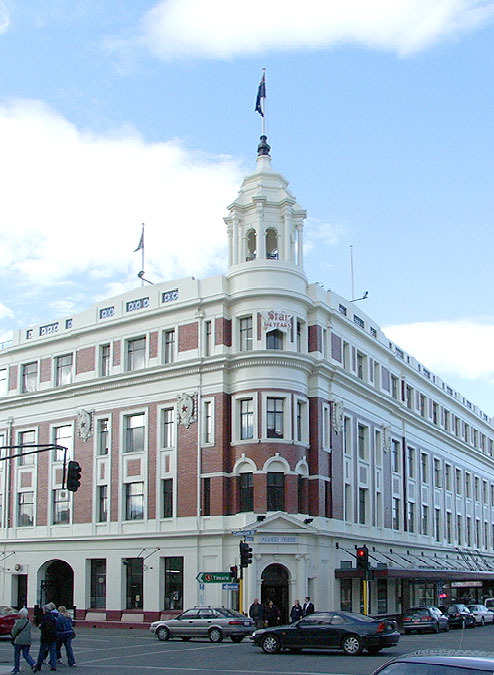
- Allied Press Building, Dunedin – the ODT's home
- Type: Daily newspaper
- Format: Broadsheet
- Owner: Allied Media
- Editor: Paul McIntyre
- Founded: 1861
- Headquarters: Dunedin, New Zealand
- Circulation: 26,435 (2021)
- ISSN: 0114-426X
- Website: www.odt.co.nz

The Otago Daily Times (ODT) is a newspaper published by Allied Media Ltd in Dunedin, New Zealand. The ODT is one of the country's four main daily newspapers, serving the southern South Island with a circulation of around 25,000 and a combined print and digital annual audience of 264,000. Founded in 1861 it is New Zealand's oldest surviving daily newspaper – Christchurch's The Press, six months older, was a weekly paper until March 1863.

Its motto is "Optima Durant" or "Quality Endures".

== History ==
=== Founding ===
The ODT was founded by William H. Cutten and Julius (later Sir Julius) Vogel during the boom following the discovery of gold at the Tuapeka, the first of the Otago goldrushes. Co-founder Vogel had learnt the newspaper trade while working as a goldfields correspondent, journalist and editor in Victoria prior to immigrating to New Zealand. Vogel had arrived in Otago in early October 1861 at the age of 26 and soon took up employment at the Otago Colonist, which was owned and edited by William Lambert. Within several weeks he left and joined its rival the weekly Otago Witness newspaper as editor and also became its co-owner when he purchased a half share in the business from Cutten. The business becoming Cullen and Vogel. Vogel convinced Cutten that due to the explosion due to the gold rush in population (from 12,691 in 1860 to over 29,000 by the end of 1861) now was the time to publish a daily newspaper.

Originally styled The Otago Daily Times, the ODT was first published on 15 November 1861, making it New Zealand's oldest surviving daily newspaper. The first issue which had four pages was sold for threepence and was printed by hand on a cylinder printing machine imported from Melbourne. It soon had a circulation of 2,750 compared with the 250 of the Otago Witness. From the start, the ODT held a strong position among South Island newspapers. Vogel was editor, with the day to day commercial management under the control of Benjamin Farjeon, who had come to Dunedin from Victoria in 1861. Farjeon also acted as sub-editor, contributor and frequently compositor. During Farjeon's time at the ODT he wrote the novels. Shadows on the Snow (1965) and Grif: a story of colonial life (1866) and he composed and set them in type in the office of the newspaper. Daniel Campbell, who had been Cutten's manager for some years, became manager of the mechanical departments of the business.

The transformation of Dunedin in a short space of time into a large and prosperous town eager for news combined with the literary control of Vogel and management skills of Farjeon lead to the ODT rapidly gaining readers and advertisers. Vogel's strong political views saw an outlet in the ODT's pages, notably for advocacy of provincial government. The newspaper's original literacy staff consisted of Vogel, chief reporter Edward Thomas Gillon and William Harrison. Another reporter that Vogel later hired was Ebenezer Fox who went on to have a notable career in politics.

By early March 1862 its number of pages had doubled. Raising demand lead to a steam-powered two-cylinder printing press being imported from the United Kingdom, which was fortunate as it was being used to printed a circulation of 7,000 copies by August 1862. This was despite an increase in the newspapers price to sixpence due to a combination of increasing newsprint and labour costs.

Vogel also acted as editor of the Otago Witness, which for a period was practically only a reprint of the ODT.

The ODT was originally published from premises in Princes Street, but within a fortnight of its first issue a fire on 1 December 1861 swept through the premises. William Lambert the owner of the Otago Colonist offered the use of his printing plant, with the condition that as he was deeply religious, they could use it until after midnight on what was to him the sacrosanct Sunday. The ODT appeared the next day reduced in size and with no advertisements. Following repairs, the business moved back into the premises and stayed there until they moved to a new building at the corner of Dowling and Burlington Streets at the foot of Bell Hill in 1879. It stayed here until 1928 when it moved into larger premises on the other side of Burlington Street facing Queen's Gardens, where they stayed until 1977.

As more and more people were attracted to the goldfields the business had trouble retaining employees, despite paying staff such as compositors double that of those in similar positions in Melbourne. It was soon necessary to offer compositors another 50% increase in an attempt to retain them. As a result, they could earn £12 to 14 a week during the height of the gold rush. Despite this on one occasion all but one compositor had left for the gold fields, which required Farjeon (who had trained as a printer's devil and then as a compositor) to step and assist in the publication.

In 1862 the Evening News was launched as an afternoon rival and by 1863 had achieved a circulation of 1,000, but it closed the next year. It is not to be confused with the Evening Star which launched on 1 May 1863 as a daily afternoon newspaper (selling for a penny) and which was the longest-lived rival to the ODT.

=== Impact of the telegraph ===
Vogel identified that the completion of telegraph lines as the country was opened up gave the daily ODT an advantage The completion of a telegraph line from Campbelltown later Bluff) to Dunedin in August 1862 in particular allowed the ODT to gain quicker access to international news as Bluff was the first New Zealand port of call for ships carrying English and Australian newspapers before travelling up the coast to Dunedin. Vogel arranged for summaries of the foreign news to be prepared by an employee of the Argus newspaper in Melbourne, put on a mail ship and then dispatched by telegraph to the ODT when it arrived in Bluff. When the telegraph line reached Hokitika, he also arranged for international news arriving upon a ship to also be dispatched from there. Originally, he reserved the information of the sole use of the ODT. Once a telegraph line was opened across Cook Strait, Vogel made his telegrams available for sale to Wellington and soon after other North Island newspapers. This ability for a daily to more quickly convey the latest news to the public gave the ODT an advantage over a weekly newspaper. As a result, Cutten's and Vogel's own Otago Witness declined in importance and slowly became a digest of reprints from its daily sister and original material oriented towards country readers.

The Otago Colonist which had previously been a weekly responded by becoming a daily in July 1862. Its owners launched in early January 1863 a new daily newspaper called the Daily Telegraph and reverted the Otago Colonist to a weekly with a change of name to the Weekly Colonist. This made Dunedin the first New Zealand city to have two daily newspapers until both the Daily Telegraph and Weekly Colonist closed on 9 April 1864. Twelve weeks later the Otago Daily Mail was launched but it was not competitive and had closed by April 1865.

In January 1863 the ODT halved its price to threepence (3d).

In 1864 the ODT was successfully sued by the New Zealand Banking Corporation for libel after it had claimed that it was not a legally constituted joint stock bank. The bank was awarded £500 in damages which highlighted to Cutten, a man of a contented disposition, that as well as the pressures of producing a daily edition there was also sufficient financial risks. This was enough to induce him to sell his share in the newspaper to Vogel in November 1864. Vogel took on Farjeon as his junior partner in what became J. Vogel & Co.

By early 1865 the business was struggling financially. With Vogel beginning his political career, the partners sold a majority shareholding in the business in March 1865 to a number of prominent Dunedin citizens on the condition that they were kept on as manager and editor respectively. The new owners formed a public company in 1860, the Otago Daily Times and Witness Newspapers Co. Ltd which was funded by issuing £6,000 worth of debentures at 10% offering interest. Vogel, John Bathgate, F.C. Simmons and James Rattray as directors. Farjeon retired as business manager in December 1867, and Campbell was appointed in his place.

=== Ousting of Vogel ===
The end of the gold rush lead to Dunedin enduring a major economic downturn from 1868 to 1869. As Vogel became more and more involved in the politics. The other more commercially minded directors who were by now Rattray and W.D. Murison with Bathgate now the company secretary, aware of the need for the newspaper to earn sufficient income pay the interest on the debentures came to believe that Vogel's use of the newspaper to advocate on behalf of his political beliefs, was impacting on the business. Murison and Bathgate also had political interests which may have entered into the decision to dispense with Vogel's services in April 1868. The rest of the entire editorial staff were also soon let go. At an extraordinary general meeting of the company in July of that year Vogel made an unsuccessful attempt at retaining his position by offering to lease the company. His offer was rejected by 96 to nil. Using the offices of the Evening Star Vogel in partnership with others launched the New Zealand Sun on 16 November 1868 as a morning rival to the ODT but it lasted only until 20 March 1869. Following the departure of Vogel, the newspaper became an opponent of his political policies and thus once he became a member of the government it was anti-government from 1869 to 1876. One of the people sacked from the ODT in the purge of editorial staff in 1868 was George Bell who in January 1869 started the evening daily Evening Independent. In June of that same year Bell purchased the Evening Star and merged the Evening Independent into it.

=== Telegram libel case ===
Meanwhile, the editorship of the ODT was given to lawyer George Burnett Barton. Despite circulation falling from its high of 7,000 copies in 1862 and the departure of Vogel the ODT remained the province's dominant newspaper through the 1860s. Poor economic conditions in the early 1870s made things difficult for the ODT. In 1871 it saw off a threat from the short lived daily The Southern League and Daily Advertiser which began publication in early July and which despite a name change to The Daily Advertiser and Southern League, closed by 10 November 1871. Barton was not however a success, as a number of libel actions were taken against the newspaper, most notably a celebrated case which became known as the "Telegram Libel Case". In October 1870 Barton had published articles in the alleging that the Telegraph Department delayed news telegrams for the ODT until summaries had been given to pro-government newspapers in Wellington. The government took exception to these comments. Vogel was serving in a senior position in the government and there was suspicions that as Vogel's departure from the newspaper had been somewhat acrimonious, he still harboured a significant grudge:

Mr Barton, as our readers may remember, is the ex-editor of the Otago Daily Times, a paper which supports political views inimical to the present Government, a member of which, Mr Vogel, was his predecessor in the editorial chair. Mr Vogel, it appears, alleges that the proprietors of the journal in question did not treat him well, and in order to be revenged on them he has never ceased to pursue his successor with every annoyance that could suggest itself to a little mind and a naturally spiteful nature.

— Melbourne Argus, 29 April 1871

The government managed to locate evidence that identified that Barton was author of the articles and prosecuted him for libel. In the process of gathering evidence the government offered Otago Daily Times staff a 'pardon in advance' so they would not incriminate themselves in giving evidence against Barton. After he was committed for trial in January 1871, the case was dropped. Barton was not inclined to let matters rest and in March 1871, he launched a writ against Charles Lemon the head of the Telegraph Department, accusing him of a breach of the Telegraph Act (1865) over the so-called Stafford Timaru speech affair. In his writ Barton accused him of obtaining a copy of a report that a reporter had sent by telegraph on a speech by William Stafford in April 1870 and allowing it to be used for political purposes. Barton argued that the telegram was effectively the private property of the ODT, but his claim was rejected by the court. Following the conclusion of the case in 1871 Barton resigned and was succeeded as editor by William Murison. About two years previously J. G. Fraser had been appointed to the position of manager of the company. Murison held the editorship until 1877 when he was succeeded by George M Reed, who held the position only until 1878.

=== Increasing competition ===
George Bell, the owner of the afternoon Evening Star made a direct foray into directly completing with the ODT by launching the Morning Star in December 1872, but while the combined circulation of the two newspapers was over 4,000 this was still less than that of the ODT. In 1873 what eventually was to be called the Guardian Printing and Publishing Company was formed to purchase the Morning Star which they intended to rename the Daily News, but by the time it appeared on 23 July 1873 it was called the Otago Guardian a new daily morning rival. It was edited by Robert Creighton, who had formerly been editor of the Auckland's Southern Cross. Evening newspapers always had an advantage over the morning ODT as they had access to the latest news that had come in over the telegraph during the day. The telegraph office closed at midnight, which with the exception of local news, meant that the morning newspaper could only print the previous days national and international news.

In January 1874 the Guardian Printing and Publishing Company began publishing the weekly Southern Mercury which was edited by Vincent Pyke. By the mid-1870s the Otago Guardian was struggling against the ODT. Following the resignation of its manager Captain Baldwin in 1875 George Fenwick took up the position. Soon recognizing after several months in the position that it was impossible to make headway against the ODT and thus stem the losses that the business was incurring Fenwick recommended to the directors of the company that they sell both the Otago Guardian and the Southern Mercury if possible, and, if not, to cease the publication. Taking his advice, a new owner was found in April 1876 the form of George McCullagh Reed who had moved to Dunedin earlier in that same year and, possibly with financial assistance from his former partner in the Auckland Star, Henry Brett, established in partnership with George Jones a new paper, a third iteration of the Evening News, for the purpose of supporting the threatened provincial system. When deciding to purchase the publications Reed believed that he could redeem the newspaper's fortunes by the sheer force and power of bis writing and editing. Against his better judgment, Fenwick was influenced by Reed's conviction, and stayed on in his position and also became a partner. Later that year Fenwick also became a partner in the Evening News which was later closed in 1878.

=== Takeover by Fenwick and Reed ===
Despite Reed and Fenwick's best efforts the finances of the Otago Guardian continued to deteriorate and it took little more than a year's experience for Reed by 1877 to come to share Fenwick's view that Dunedin was not able to support two daily morning newspapers, theirs and the Otago Daily Times. Fenwick had a brainstorm and staggered Reed when he proposed that they should endeavour to obtain the ownership, via a reverse takeover of the much larger and more prosperous ODT and the Otago Witness. Thus by amalgamating their publications with their older-established more successful rivals, they could transform the two concerns into a lucrative business. The directors of their rivals were adamantly opposed and it was necessary for Fenwick and Reed by using W. H. Reynolds as secret negotiator and by raising and offer £30,000 before they gained control. As soon as Reed and Fenwick assumed control of the ODT and Otago Witness, the staff of the rival publications were merged and the Otago Guardian and the Southern Mercury ceased publication. Reed took on the editorship of both the ODT and Otago Witness while Silas Spragg from the Otago Guardian became the chief reporter of the ODT.

=== Staff depart to start a rival newspaper ===
The amalgamation of the various newspapers necessarily involved some reduction in the number of the employees, and it was the intention of Reed and Fenwick to endeavour to equalise matters by selecting their permanent employees in fair proportions from the respective staffs of the former rivals. However the former ODT employees took up the position that unless they were all retained, they would not accept a job under the new owners. This condition the owners declined to accede to, and the result was that the "ODT employees started an opposition paper, the Morning Herald which was launched in December 1877 aggressively priced at one penny, as against threepence being charged for the ODT. The men had many sympathisers and the former directors of the Times Company and their friends gave the new venture all the help they possibly could. The rival soon had a circulation of compatible with that of the ODT. In 1878 out of a combined population of 32,792 for the city and suburbs the average daily circulation of the ODT (which varied between 2,500 and 4,000) was about the same as the 10.7% of the Daily Morning Herald (approximately 3,000), well short of the 22.3% of afternoon Evening Star, the 17.8% of the Evening Tribune while the weekly Otago Witness was 20% and another weekly, the Penny Post was 6.1%. The Saturday Advertiser is believed to have reached around 20% of the total population.

=== Sold back into public ownership ===
The loss of circulation and thus revenue to the Morning Herald, coupled with the collapse in 1878 of the City of Glasgow Bank leading to a withdrawal of British funds which impacted on Otago runholders and weakened a struggling economy had a serious financial impact on the business. Reed and Fenwick had also assumed a considerable debt to buy their rival. In desperation Fenwick urged Reed to take the prudent course and protect themselves to the floating of the business as a public company. A prospectus was issued in April 1878 with William H. Reynolds, H. S. Chapman, Sir John L. C. Richardson, Robert Stout, Robert Campbell, Thomas Hocken, George Fenwick, James Marshall, Walter Guthrie, Bendix Hallenstein, Henry F. Hardy, John Reid, and Richard H. Leary listed as among the provisional directors, of a company to be known as the Otago Daily Times and Witness Newspapers Company, Ltd. The capital was £40,000 in 4,000 shares of £10 each, of which £7.10s was to be called up.

The flotation of the company was successful, and at a meeting of shareholders held on 10 June 1878. William H. Reynolds, Thomas Hocken, Richard H. Leary, Walter Guthrie, James Smith, and George Fenwick were elected directors. Reynolds was appointed chairman and Fenwick was made managing director. Reed remained editor of the ODT but departed in 1878 to become New Zealand's immigration agent in Ireland.

Fenwick believed that the only one course open to the company to gain circulation and stop the progress of their rival was to reduce the price of the ODT to match that of the Morning Herald; but it took several years before his more conservative colleagues on the board would agree to this, the ODT reducing its price to one penny on 1 February 1881. The result completely justified as the reduction as the circulation of the ODT rapidly increased initially to 4,100 and then to 4,000 to 6,000 in 1882 at the expense of its rival which steadily declined until after a hopeless struggle it became an evening paper in May 1884 and changing its name to the Evening Herald' Despite this and a change of ownership it ceased publication in August 1890 when it merged with the Globe a liberal publication that had been launched in response to a maritime shrike. The Globe creased publication in 1893. The ODT was still however less popular than that of the Evening Star which had a circulation of 5,300 a day in 1876 and over 7,500 in 1881.

The newspapers opposition to the policies of both Vogel and Sir George Grey changed when it became a public company under the chairmanship of W. H. Reynolds as he was an ally of both Vogel and Grey.

The business added a lithographic department in 1879. When Richard Twopeny resigned from the editorship of the Otago Daily Times in 1890 after a disagreement with the directors, Fenwick also took on the editorship duties,. The introduction of linotype machines in 1898 lead to the redundancy of 30 compositors. In 1909 Fenwick handed the editorship of the newspaper to James Hutchison. While William Easton succeeded him as manager in 1919, Fenwick remained managing director of the Otago Daily Times until his death. By the first decade of the twentieth century weekday issues of the ODT had eight pages, which occasionally doubled on Saturdays. By late 1910 the weekday issues had increased to 10 to 12 pages.

=== Impact of World War I ===
Prior to the commencement of the First World War the cost of imported newsprint, was £12 a ton (landed). As the war progressed freight cost began to increase and contracts became more onerous which forced the ODT to increase its price to 1½d, the first price increase since 1881. Even after the end of the war the landed cost of newsprint continued to climb, reaching at its peak £60 a ton which forced the newspaper to increase in price on 8 March 1920 to 2d a copy.

=== Amalgamation ===
As has been seen most of its Dunedin opposition papers were short lived, with only the Evening Star surviving until it merged with the ODT in 1975 forming a new company, Allied Press, and the ODT moved to the Evening Star Building (now the Allied Media Building) in Stuart Street in June 1977. The Evening Star ceased publication in November 1979 because its readership was declining. As a result, the Allied Press, now publishes the ODT and several smaller papers throughout New Zealand, including the Greymouth Star and the former The Lakes District and Central Otago News.

On 5 January 1998 the ODT published for the first time on a new Goss International printing press; on the same day it introduced a new masthead reading simply "Otago Daily Times", marking Otago's 150th anniversary year of Pākehā settlement.

=== Into the 21st century ===
On 16 March 2016, the newspaper launched a metered paywall on its website limiting readers to between 15 and 20 free articles per month before having to pay a NZ$27 monthly subscription. While The Spinoff claimed that this made the Otago Daily Times the first major news publisher in New Zealand to implement a paywall, StopPress stated that the ODT was following the lead of other domestic news publications including the Ashburton Guardian, the Gisborne Herald, and the National Business Review. The ODT did not implement its paywall until September 2022, with new subscribers being charged NZ$15 a month while print subscribers were able to access online content for free.

In late July 2025, the newspaper's owner Allied Press merged with its subsidiary Star Media to form a consolidated brand called Allied Media.

=== Milestones ===
- 1861 – 15 November: first edition.
- 1881 – price dropped to one penny.
- 1898 – first linotype machines installed. They were supplied by the English Linotype Company following a visit by Fenwick in 1897 the United States and Britain to investigate suitable machines.
- 1900 – first photoengraving plant installed.
- 1949 – first full-time cartoonist employed.
- 1952 – November: the ODT became the first New Zealand metropolitan paper to print news rather than classified advertisements on the front page.
- 1955 – new general printing department inaugurated.
- 1956 – wire photographic equipment installed.
- 1961 – new enlarged format.
- 1966 – first full colour gravure pre-printing.
- 1978 – 13 and 20 October: no edition due to journalists' strike; first missed days of publication in 117 years.
- 1979 – November: Evening Star ceased publication; ODT size increased to compensate.
- 1980 – August: three separate editions published for first time, serving Dunedin city, North Otago, and Central/South Otago.
- 1981 – July: first computerised publishing.
- 1987 – December: change to coloured masthead, simplified to "Otago Daily Times" with no "the".
- 1988 – November: new typeface and formatting.
- 1998 – 5 January: new Goss International press; new masthead reading simply "Otago Daily Times"
- 1990 – June: first full-process colour printing.

== Policies and personages ==
While having politically conservative views during Fenwick's long tenure, the ODT was active in many campaigns for social reform, none more important than the exposure of sweat shop following the sermon by Presbyterian minister Rutherford Waddell in October 1888 "On the sin of cheapness", against sweat-shop labour in the clothing industry. The cause was taken up by George Fenwick in a series of articles written by the newspaper's chief reporter Silas Spragg (1852–1935) and published in January 1889 which described working conditions in Dunedin. In response to newspaper's articles which stirred many of the local community into action, a royal commission on sweating was established in 1890. Its conclusions and recommendations formed the basis of many of the country's social reforms of the following decade. In 1894, the newspaper attacked conditions in Dunedin's slaughter-houses, which resulted in a poll in April 1895 which approved the establishment of public abattoirs. During Fenwick's editorship the newspaper also supported funding of the University of Otago, a women's hospital ward, the expansion of the University of Otago Medical School, and the Hocken Library.

Sid Scales was a cartoonist for the ODT for 30 years until his retirement in 1981. Queenstown artist Garrick Tremain was then the principal cartoonist until he stopped working for the paper in the wake of the 2019 measles cartoon controversy (see below).

== Controversy ==
In December 2019, the Otago Daily Times was heavily criticized for publishing a cartoon by the Queenstown–based cartoonist and painter Garrick Tremain which seemed to mock a measles outbreak in Samoa. The measles crisis caused 4,000 confirmed cases and killed 55 people, most of them children under the age of 4. The newspaper later apologized, saying, "The content and timing of the cartoon were insensitive, and we apologise without reservation for publishing it". On 23 December, the New Zealand Media Council ruled that Tremain's cartoon was "gratuitously hurtful and discriminatory" in response to 130 complaints.

University of Otago student, Millie Lovelock, was a student columnist of "A Situation Report" from late 2014 to March 2017. She addressed issues of sexism, cuts to humanities courses and concerns on the future for young women. Her views on misogyny and the "toxic masculinity" evidenced by the nation's rugby culture drew considerable complaint in the ODT's letters to the editor pages. ODT journalist Vaughan Elder reported that she was "so polarising" and that "predominantly older white men" took issue with her opinions. After finishing her master's degree, Lovelock left journalism to continue her career as a musician and won the Taite Music Prize for Best Independent Debut in May 2020 for her album Relief (2019).

== Editors ==
- 1861–68 Sir Julius Vogel
- 1868–71 George Burnett Barton
- 1871–77 William Murison
- 1877–78 George McCullagh Reed
- 1878–83 James Ashcroft
- 1883–90 Richard Twopeny
- 1890–1909 Sir George Fenwick
- 1909–46 Sir James Hutchinson
- 1946–61 John Rowley Moffett
- 1961–76 Allan Aubin
- 1976–88 Keith Eunson
- 1988–97 Geoff Adams
- 1997–2007 Robin Charteris
- 2007–2015 Murray Kirkness
- 2015–2023 Barry Stewart
- June 2023– Paul McIntyre

== Regular supplements ==
The Otago Daily Times is delivered with the following regular inserted tabloid supplements:

- World Focus (international news and commentary, Mondays)
- Sport (sports news, Fridays)
- The Mix (lifestyle/entertainment, Saturdays)

== Community newspapers ==
The following sister publications of the ODT are weekly free newspapers:

- The News (also called The Lakes District and Central Otago News), Alexandra
- The Star (Dunedin)
- The Courier (Ashburton)
- The Ensign (Gore)
- Southern Rural Life and Canterbury Rural Life, region-wide farming papers
- Southland Express (Invercargill)
- The Courier (Timaru)
- The Oamaru Mail (Oamaru)
- Mountain Scene (Queenstown)
- Clutha Leader (Clutha District)
