= Star Media =

News publishing company based in Christchurch, New Zealand

- Company type: Subsidiary/Limited company
- Industry: Mass media
- Headquarters: Christchurch, New Zealand
- Key people: Charlotte Smith-Smulders (publisher/director); Pier Smulders (publisher/director); Barry Clarke (Editor in chief)
- Products: Newspaper; Magazine; Digital
- Parent: Allied Media
- Website: alliedmedia.co.nz

Star Media, formerly known as Mainland Press and Mainland Media, was a Christchurch-based media company that was a subsidiary of the New Zealand media company Allied Media (formerly Allied Press). Notable assets include the Christchurch community newspaper The Star, the South Island lifestyle magazine Style, and national magazines Kiwi Gardener, Kiwi Gardener Quarterly and Rugby News. Star Media also runs several Christchurch events including the City 2 Surf and the Home and Leisure Show. In late July 2025, Allied Press and Star Media merged into one brand called Allied Media.

== History ==
=== Independent era, 2007–2018 ===
Star Media was the trading name of CSEPS Holdings Limited, which was founded as Mainland Press Limited on 26 March 2007. As of March 2024, the company's directors are Pier and Charlotte Smulders, who also owned the company prior to its acquisition by Allied Press.

By 2011, Mainland Press was publishing the Mainland Press newspaper, the Bay Harbour News, Best Motorbuys, Buy Sell & Exchange and CC magazine and websites. Following the 2011 Christchurch earthquake, CTV relocated to the Mainland Press headquarters with the two companies collaborating to promote local news coverage and cross-media sales. On 15 September 2011, the Mainland Press newspaper launched a weekend edition.

By February 2012, Mainland Press had acquired and relaunched the national lifestyle magazine Older & Boulder, which was published in Auckland, Wellington and Christchurch with a national circulation of 160,000. In addition, the company launched the Selwyn View newspaper on 23 February 2012. On 16 February, Mainland Press relaunched three community newspapers Norwest News, Pegasus Bay News and Southern View, which had suspended publication following the 2011 Christchurch earthquake.

On 24 February 2012, Mainland Press acquired the lifestyle magazine Weekend Gardener. From 1 March 2012, the Mainland Press newspaper was published as a weekly edition on Thursdays.

On 23 August 2012, Mainland Press Limited changed its name to Mainland Media Limited. In November 2012, Mainland Media announced plans to boost Mainland Press's circulation to 75,000 by January 2013.

On 18 April 2013, Mainland Media purchased Christchurch Star and The Oamaru Mail from APN New Zealand Media. At the time, Mainland Media was owned by Pier and Charlotte Smith-Smulders, and chaired by Allied Press director Nick Smith. Following its acquisition of The Star, the company changed its name to The Christchurch Star Company Limited on 29 July 2013.

=== Allied Press subsidiary, 2018–2025 ===
On 3 July 2018, the company assumed its current name CSEP Holdings Ltd. On 1 August 2018, Star Media and its stable of community newspapers, magazines, digital platforms and events was acquired by the Dunedin-based media company Allied Press. Under Allied Press ownership, Charlotte Smith-Smulders remained as the company's Magazine's publisher.

During the COVID-19 pandemic in New Zealand, Star Media suspended the publication of its community newspapers to comply with the New Zealand Government's lockdown policies in mid-April 2020. Steve McCaughan, the Regional Manager of Star Media, described the government's decision as devastating.

=== Allied Media merger, 2025–present ===
On 31 July 2025, Allied Press and Star Media combined their brands to form Allied Media. Smith-Smulders remained as magazine publisher in the merged entity while Nick Smith serves as a member of the Allied Media board.
