= The Ensign (newspaper) =

Newspaper in Gore, New Zealand

- Type: Twice weekly newspaper
- Owner: Allied Media
- Founded: 10 May 1878
- Headquarters: Gore, New Zealand
- ISSN: 1170-036X
- Website: The Ensign

The Ensign is a regional newspaper based in Gore, New Zealand published on Wednesdays and Fridays by Allied Media (formerly Allied Press). It was first published in 1878 as The Mataura Ensign and changed to its current name in 1973. The newspaper features coverage of local government, sports and recreation, arts and entertainment, education, farming and business news. It is currently distributed to approximately 12,000 homes over a circulation area that includes Gore and the surrounding area that stretches from Mandeville and Waikaka in the north to Mataura in the south.

== History ==
=== Founding ===
The Mataura Ensign began publication in Gore (in Southland) on 10 May 1878, operating out of a hut located beside the shop of Thomson and Beattie. Its full title was The Mataura Ensign, Southlander, and Southern Free Press, Mataura Valley, Gore, Mataura Bridge, Edendale, Woodlands, Wyndham, Toi Tois, Waimea, Otaria, Clinton, Tapanui, Popotunoa, Waiwera, Waikaka, Otamete, Waikaia, Switzers, Riversdale, Nokomai, Kingston, Winton, Invercargill, Bluff, and Riverton Reporter and Advertiser. It was established by Joseph Mackay who owned the Bruce Herald in Milton at the time. Mackay, a Dunedin bookseller and maker of almanacs, was known as a "rag-planter", which was a New Zealand newspaper phenomenon which lasted until the early 1920 whereby enterprising entrepreneurs having identified a growing settlement, would bring in a printing plant and editor, publish several issues of their newspaper often offering cheap advertising rates and then advertise the business for lease or to sale (often to an existing rival). "Rag-planters" tended to favour establishing their newspapers in the months leading up to a general elections.

The "Mataura" in the title comes from the locality, while the "Ensign" is sourced from the Scottish newspaper, the Northern Ensign. The paper's name was suggested by Mackay's local business partner/editor George Renner, after the Scottish newspaper the Northern Ensign. Renner and his partner James Sinclair canvassed the district for subscribers and advertisers.

Mackay was also a pioneer of the "chain newspaper" concept in New Zealand where a small regional newspaper was owned or linked to a larger newspaper from which they sourced a large part of their content. This was reflected in that ten of the twelve weekly pages of the early editions of The Mataura Ensign were directly sourced from the Bruce Herald with the other two being produced locally by George Renner. The pages were printed for the proprietor in Gore by Henry Hughes. This transfer of content was undertaken by shipping the typesetting from town to town for reprinting. The Mataura Ensign was initially published once a week.

Mackay was subsequently forced by financial difficulties to sell the newspaper to F. S. Canning on 4 April 1879. Mackay went on to establish the Southern Free Press and Mataura Herald in 1882 (often referred to as just the Southern Press) which was printed at Gore, Invercargill Mataura and Wyndham but this paper failed to compete with existing newspapers and was sold after eight months and incorporated into The Mataura Ensign. Renner was succeeded as editor by Henderson Carrick. Later owing to a difference of opinion of the relative importance of proprietor and editor, Carrick left.

Canning on 1 April 1881 took in J. G. Souness and a Mr Green as partners. From 1881 the newspaper was published twice weekly. Carrick's place was filled by J. Whitely King. Canning retired from the firm, with Green and Souness carrying on the business for another 16 months.

=== Purchase by Alfred Dolamore ===
Experienced Milton newspaper publisher Alfred Dolamore (1858-1895) bought the newspaper from Green and Sourness on 1 August 1882. Dolamore had previous experience on the Nelson Evening Mail and The Southland Times. The Mataura Ensign expanded rapidly under Dolamore and he took on Alfred George Benson Godby in July 1887 as a partner, until upon Godby retiring from the partnership in 1891, Dolamore's brother J. Howard Dolamore (1869-1947) joined him in the partnership. Godby subsequently accidentally killed himself at the age of 38 in 1896 while trying to shoot a cat.

Under the partners the newspaper moved into larger premises and increased its circulation area.

=== Competition ===
As the better-capitalized business grew it absorbed in addition to the "Southern Free Press and Mataura Herald", the small rural weekly The Waikaia Herald in April 1883 (which was first published at Waikaia for the Switzers goldfield on 13 January 1882), The Waimea Plains Review in 1896 (which was first published at Riversdale in 1892 by a stock and station agency ), and in mid-1897 The Clutha County Gazette (which was published at Clinton).

More serious competition arrived for the newspaper when the Southern Standard began publication on 14 June 1887. When news reached the owners of The Mataura Ensign that William J. Marsh who had previously owned the Lake Country Press was intending to publish a newspaper in the town of Wyndham, something that could result in loss of circulation in their area they decided to combat it by producing their own rival. They dispatched Ewen Greville Macpherson (1863- ) to the town to produce The Wyndham Farmer, which was published on Monday, Wednesday and Friday mornings, starting on 1 July 1895. Marsh's rival, The Wyndham Herald which appeared on 3 July of that same year was also a tri-weekly and was published for the new 40 years. Eventually both newspapers were published twice weekly. The Wyndham Farmer was sold on 1 January 1898 to Macpherson, who together with his son published the newspaper for the next 50 years.

Under the Dolamore's stewardship The Mataura Ensign retained a strong literary flavour, claiming amongst its staff the noted historian James Herries Beattie (1881-1972). He compiled extensive files on the history of Southland through oral interviews and correspondence. The newspaper began to intermittently feature a "children's corner" from the mid-1890s. From 1899 under the by-line of "Uncle Phil", William Gilchrist, headmaster of East Gore School, wrote a column for many years, those intention was to nurture the writing skills of children.

When Alfred Dolamore died in 1895 control of the business passed to his brother J. Howard Dolamore. After a disastrous fire on 21 June 1898 which destroyed everything except the printing machine, the newspaper moved from Gorton Street to new premises at the western end of Mersey Street, Gore.

In 1901 George James Anderson became part-owner and business manager of the newspaper and was editor from 1908 until he entered politics. The newspaper changed from a tri-weekly to a daily on 2 April 1906.

The Southern Standard changed its name in 1906 to the Gore Standard, to reflect that it was changing to a daily morning newspaper. In 1908 the Gore Standard and The Mataura Ensign both came under the ownership of newly formed The Gore Printing and Publishing Co. After having reverted to a tri-weekly publication of the Gore Standard ceased in 1910 as a result of being incorporated into its sister publication. Once publication of the Gore Standard creased the newspaper was very successful as it was the principal advertising media in the district.

On 29 March 1913 For the first time in its history the newspaper was not published due to the impact of a flood which inundated the entire town.

In 1920 the business was reorganized with new investors and was renamed the Gore Publishing Company.

In 1963 the business was sold to A. R. Tullock and R. G. Wood.

By 1970 the business was in financial difficulties which lead a group of Gore businessman (among whom were Gabriel Farry, Hallen Smith and Mac Tulloch), in association with Allied Press of Dunedin to purchase the business. In 1971 the business moved along the street to 47 Mersey Street.

The newspaper changed its name to the Ensign in 1973.

=== Allied Press/Media ownership, 1993–present ===
In 1993 Allied Press purchased the remaining shares in the company. During this time the newspapers profitability was assisted by contracts to print coupon books for supermarkets. However by the late 1990s first radio and then free community newspapers began providing competition for the advertising dollar. Many advertisers began moving to the community newspapers which could offer a circulation of 12,000 to 14,000 compared with the Ensign's 4,000. As a result the newspaper's profitably declined due to the combination of small print runs and lack of advertising. In 1999 the last edition of the newspaper was printed in Gore. The press was sold and hereafter Allied Press printed the newspaper in Dunedin.

On 27 July 2011 due to a heavy fall of snow the newspaper was not published, for only the second time in its history .

By 2015 circulation had increased to 14,000.

On 25 March 2020, The Ensign and other Allied Press community newspapers temporarily suspended publication to comply with COVID-19 lockdown restrictions in New Zealand. By 14 May 2020, the Government had eased lockdown restrictions, allowing community newspapers and magazines including The Ensign to resume operations.

== Editors ==
Among the editors have been J. Mackay, George Renner, Henderson Carrick, J. Whitely King, J. G. Scoular, Alfred Dolamore, G. S. Searle, A. G. B. Godby, F. H. Hart, George James Anderson and John Findlay McArthur.
