= Stuart Street, Dunedin =

Street in Dunedin, New Zealand

Coordinates: 45.86919°S 170.49572°E

Central Dunedin. Stuart Street is marked in red and runs across this map, with Upper Stuart Street marked (5) and Lower Stuart Street marked (6).

Stuart Street is one of the main streets of Dunedin, New Zealand. As with many of Dunedin's streets, it is named after a main street in Edinburgh, Scotland.

Stuart Street runs orthogonally to the city's main business district of George and Princes Streets, meeting them at The Octagon, the city's centre, where it is briefly interrupted by the Octagon itself. This divides Stuart Street into two separate streets, Upper Stuart Street and Lower Stuart Street.

== Upper Stuart Street ==
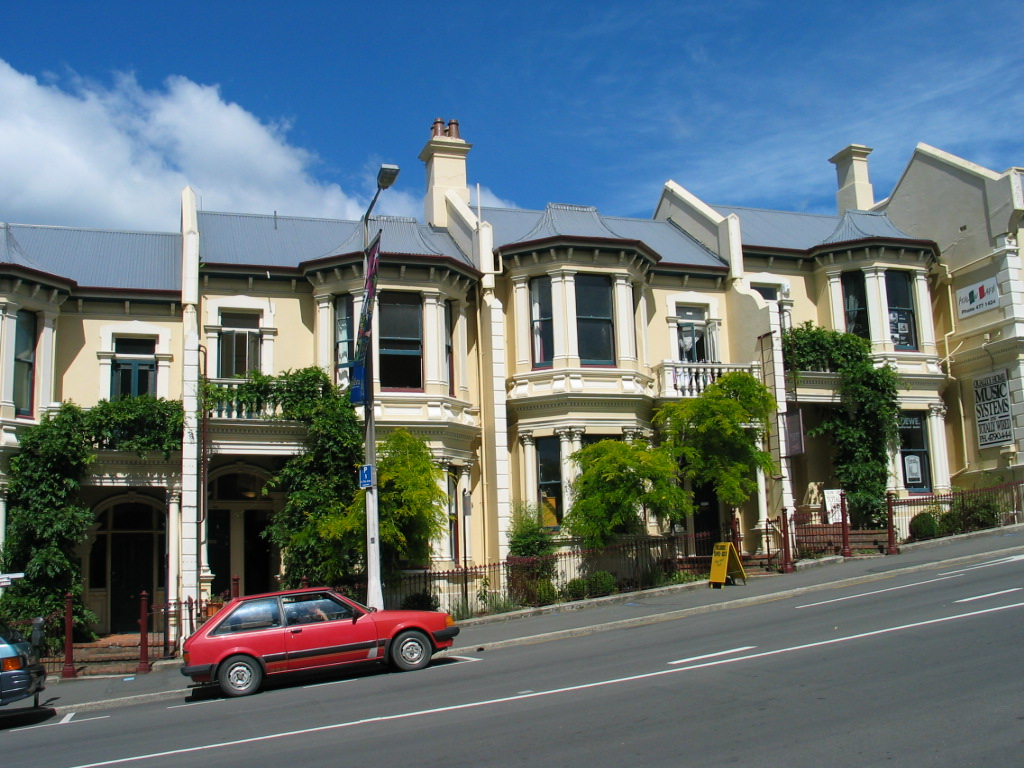
Historic terraced houses below Moray Place in Upper Stuart Street.

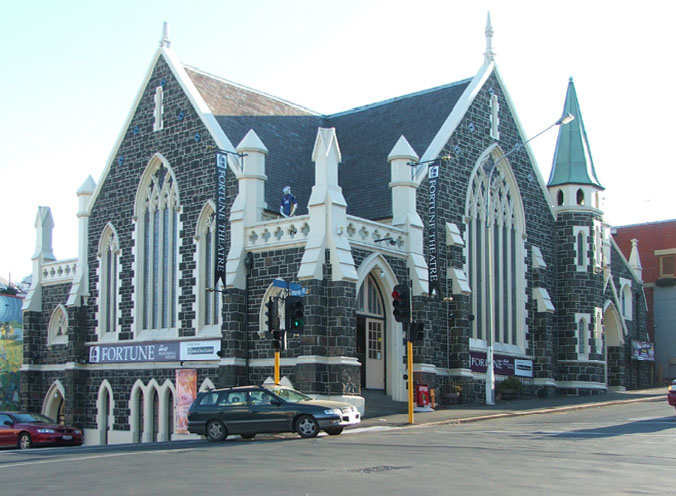
The Fortune Theatre, based in the former Trinity Methodist Church, on the corner of Moray Place and Upper Stuart Street.

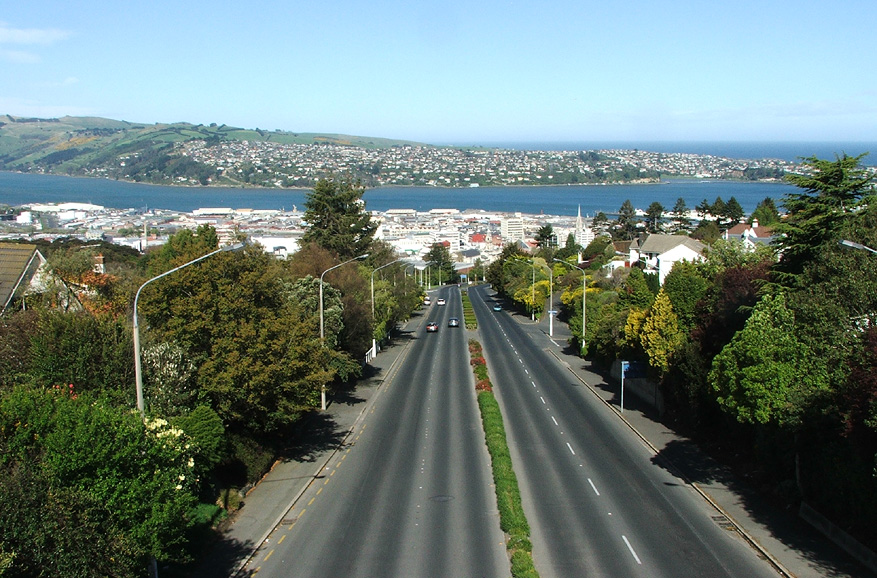
Looking down Upper Stuart Street from the Roslyn Overbridge, toward the city centre.

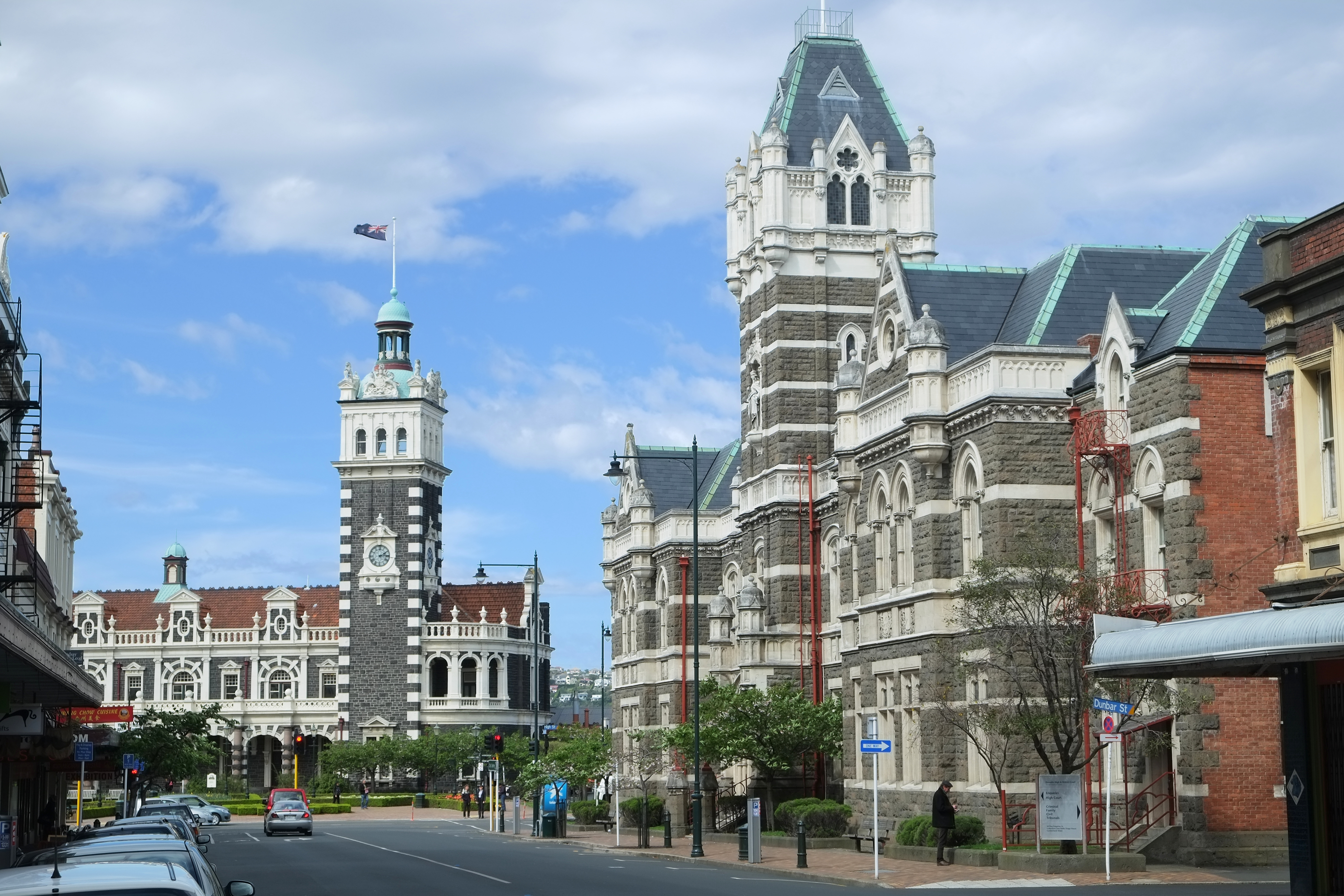
Dunedin Railway Station (centre) and Law Courts (right) seen from Lower Stuart Street.

Upper Stuart Street climbs steeply from the Octagon, crossing Moray Place and continuing up to pass through the city's Town Belt and up to the suburb of Roslyn. One of Dunedin's landmarks is the Roslyn Overbridge, which crosses Upper Stuart Street at Roslyn; shortly beyond this point Stuart Street becomes Taieri Road, the original road leading out of Dunedin toward the Taieri Plains in the hinterland to the southwest.

Until the mid 20th century, Upper Stuart Street ran from the Octagon only as far as the junction with York Place. The contract for the north-western extension of Stuart Street, incorporating the former Albert Street (which ran from York Place to London Street) and cutting through the Town Belt to Roslyn, was let in 1949. These works, which were completed in 1954, also required the demolition of Littlebourne House, which had been gifted to the City by the children of the former Mayor, the late Sir John Roberts, in 1934.

Below the Roslyn overbridge, nestled within the Town Belt, lies Dunedin's main swimming pool, Moana Pool, and the imposing structure of Otago Boys' High School. Below this are the former buildings of the Otago Polytechnic (now located in the city's north end), including the King Edward Technical College. Closer to The Octagon, at the junction of Moray Place is the former Holy Trinity Methodist Church. In the block immediately above The Octagon are St. Paul's Anglican Cathedral and a distinctive series of historic terraced houses, now restaurants and boutique shops, which have a Category I Heritage New Zealand classification.

== Lower Stuart Street ==
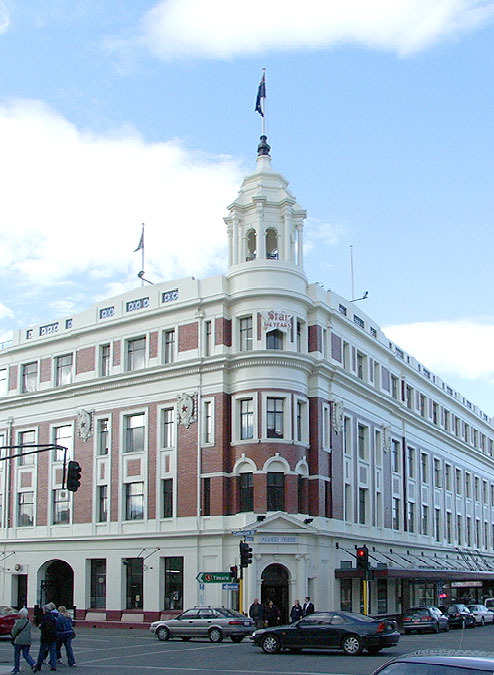
The Allied Press Building, Lower Stuart Street.

Lower Stuart Street, unlike Upper Stuart Street, is flat. It is one of Dunedin's more historic precincts. Within the heart of the CBD, it contains a large number of shops and cafes, and also, at its eastern end, several of Dunedin's more notable buildings. These include the Dunedin Law Courts and the Allied Media building (home of the Otago Daily Times newspaper). The street is dominated by the Dunedin Railway Station, which sits in Anzac Square at the foot of the street and forms a terminating vista for the street.

== New Zealand Historic Places Trust listed buildings ==
Numerous Stuart Street buildings are listed by Heritage New Zealand as Category I or Category II protected buildings. These buildings include the following (from northwest - Upper, to southeast - Lower):

- Former King Edward Technical College Building, 291 Upper Stuart St (cnr. York Place) (Category I).
- The Fortune Theatre, 231 Upper Stuart St (Category I).
- Terraced Houses, 199-223 Upper Stuart St and 118-120 Moray Place (Category I).
- Former Australia and New Zealand Bank Building, 159 Lower Stuart St (cnr. The Octagon) (Category II).
- Allbell Chambers, 127 Lower Stuart St (Category II).
- Security Building, 115 Lower Stuart St (cnr. Moray Place) (Category II).
- Fitness Centre Building, 77 Lower Stuart St (cnr. Cumberland St) (Category II).
- Law Courts Hotel, 53-65 Lower Stuart St (Category II).
- Allied Press Building, 52 Lower Stuart St (Category II).
- Dunedin Law Courts, 1 Lower Stuart St (cnr. Anzac Square) (Category I).

The Robert Burns Statue in The Octagon directly opposite the end of Upper Stuart Street, is also listed (Category I), as is Dunedin Railway Station, which lies in Anzac Square opposite the end of Lower Stuart Street.
