= Acton =

Acton may refer to:

== Places ==
=== Antarctica ===
- Mount Acton

=== Australia ===
- Acton, Australian Capital Territory, a suburb of Canberra
- Acton, Tasmania, a suburb of Burnie
- Acton Park, Tasmania, a suburb of Hobart, Tasmania, formerly known as Acton

=== Canada ===
- Acton, Ontario, a community
- Acton, New Brunswick
- Acton Regional County Municipality, Quebec

=== New Zealand ===
- Acton, New Zealand, a rural community

=== United Kingdom ===
==== England ====
- Acton, Cheshire, a village and former civil parish
- Acton, Cheshire (ancient parish)
- Acton, Dorset, a hamlet
- Acton, London, an area of west London
  - Acton (UK Parliament constituency)
- Acton, Northumberland, a hamlet
- Acton, Shropshire, a village
- Acton, Staffordshire, a hamlet
- Acton, Suffolk, a village and civil parish
- Acton, Worcestershire
- Acton Beauchamp, a village and civil parish
- Acton Bridge, a village in Cheshire

==== Northern Ireland ====
- Acton, County Armagh, Northern Ireland, a hamlet and townland

==== Wales ====
- Acton, Wrexham, a local government community

=== United States ===
- Acton, Alabama, an unincorporated community
- Acton, California, an unincorporated census-designated place
- Acton, Florida, a former town
- Acton, Georgia, an unincorporated community
- Acton, Indiana, a community
- Acton, Kentucky, an unincorporated community
- Acton, Maine, a town
- Acton, Massachusetts, a town
- Acton Township, Meeker County, Minnesota
  - Acton, Minnesota, an unincorporated community
- Acton, Montana, an unincorporated community
- Acton, New Jersey, an unincorporated community
- Acton Township, Walsh County, North Dakota
- Acton Lake, Ohio
- Acton, Tennessee, an unincorporated community
- Acton, Texas, an unincorporated community
- Acton State Historic Site, Texas

== Schools ==
- Acton School of Business, Austin, Texas
- Acton High School (Massachusetts), a former American high school, on the National Register of Historic Places
- Ark Acton Academy, in the Acton area of the London Borough of Ealing, England

== People ==
- Acton (surname)
- Acton Bell, a pen name of Anne Brontë (1820–1849), English novelist and poet
- Eugenia de Acton, a pen name of Alethea Lewis (1749–1827), English novelist
- Acton Adams (1843–1924), British politician
- Acton Smee Ayrton (1816–1886), British barrister and politician

== Other uses ==
- Acton Institute, an American think tank
- Acton Capital Partners, an international venture capital fund
- Acton station (disambiguation)
- Baron Acton, a title in the Peerage of the United Kingdom
- Acton Football Club, a defunct Australian rules football club
- Acton (Turrell), an artwork by James Turrell
- Acton, a minor character in The Sword of Shannara by Terry Brooks
- Acton, an alternative spelling of aketon (gambeson)

== See also ==
- Acton Castle, near Perranuthnoe, Cornwall
- Acton Green (disambiguation)
- Acton Park (disambiguation)
- Acton Vale (disambiguation)
- Acton Works, a London Underground maintenance facility
