= Rakaia railway accident =

1899 railway incident in New Zealand

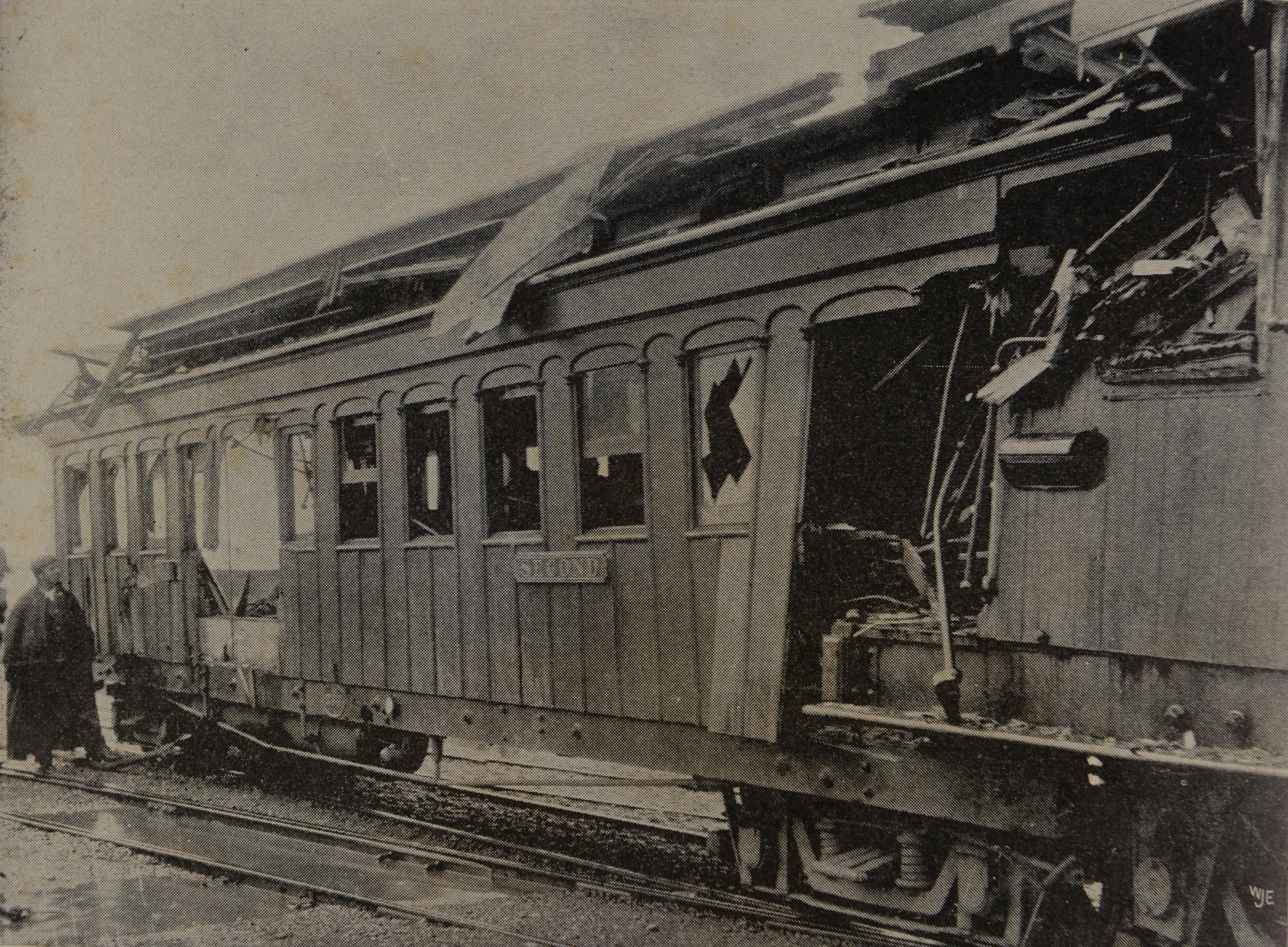
- Carriage damaged in the collision

Details
- Date: 11 March 1899
- Location: Rakaia, South Island
- Coordinates: 43.7563°S 172.0212°E
- Country: New Zealand
- Line: Main South Line
- Operator: New Zealand Railways Department
- Incident type: Collision
- Cause: Excessive speed Inadequate brakes and signals

Statistics
- Trains: 2
- Deaths: 4

The Rakaia railway accident at Rakaia, Canterbury, New Zealand on the evening of Saturday, 11 March 1899 occurred when the second of two excursion trains returning from Ashburton to Christchurch ran into the rear of the first at the Rakaia Railway Station, killing four passengers. While due to excessive speed, the accident resulted in overdue improvements by New Zealand Railways to signalling and braking.

== Background ==
Rakaia was an intermediate station on the single-track Main South Line between Ashburton and Christchurch, with a branch line to Methven. Two excursion trains carrying about 3000 workers and families from the Islington Freezing Works (abattoir) in Christchurch had been to Ashburton for their annual picnic. The first train had two locomotives and 30 carriages, and the second had one locomotive and 14 carriages plus two wagons. The first train left Ashburton at 6.05 pm. The second train left 20 minutes late at 6.35 pm., and the chief guard (William Climpson) was left on the platform. The two trains had to wait at Rakaia for the regular Christchurch-Ashburton train, and a Methven branch train was waiting on the branch line south of Rakaia Station. Conditions were wet and unpleasant, with driving rain and a south-west gale.

== Accident ==
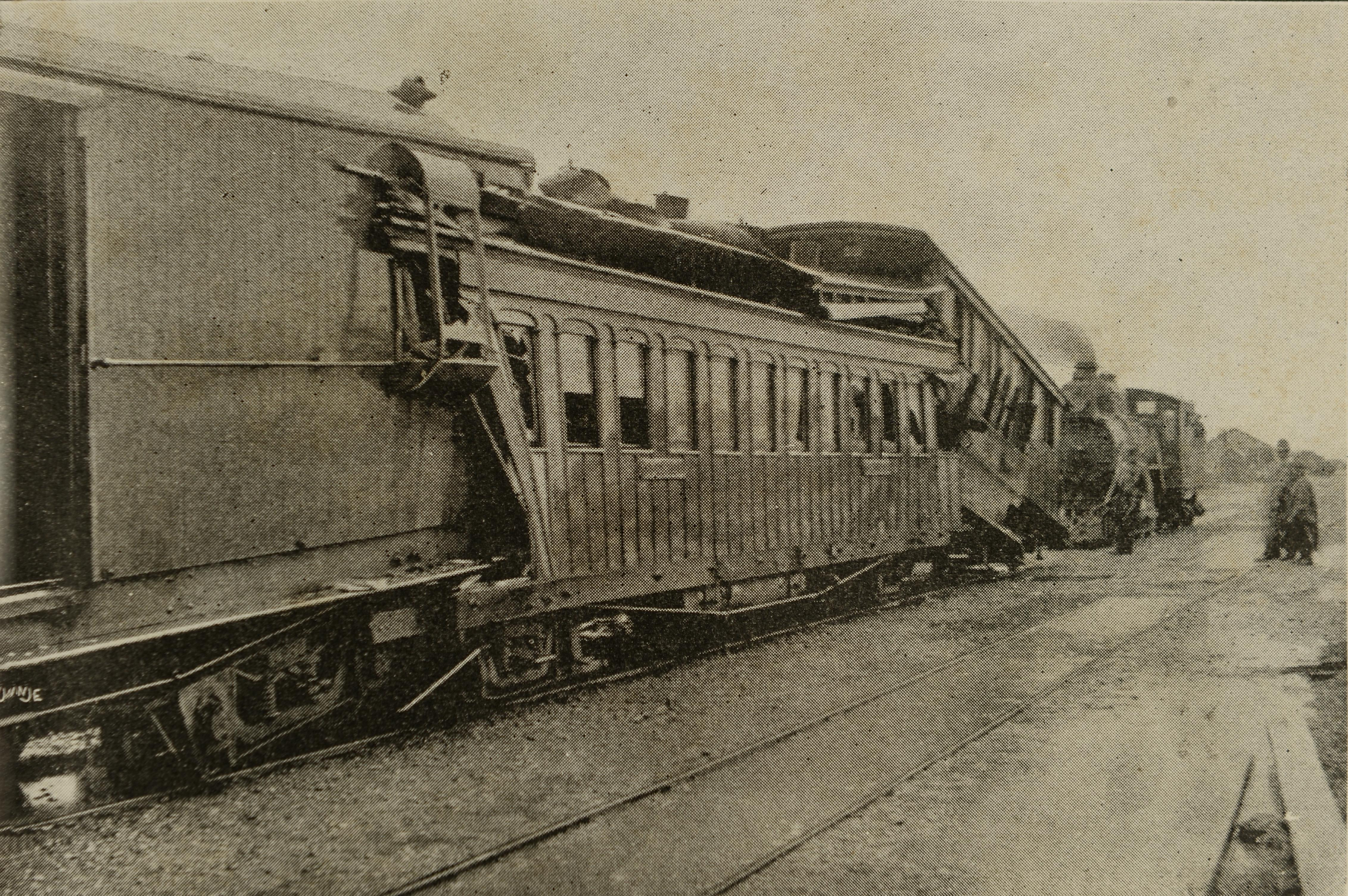
Damaged first train carriages

The second train was trying to make up time, and should have stopped short of the Rakaia station. But the driver (Charles Carter) did not brake until he saw the hand-held light of a station clerk, and the brakes skidded on the wet rails. The guard (J. Curson) of the first train saw the second train approaching fast, and signalled the drivers (William Hyland and Gardiner) to move the first train. Though the first train only had time to move two coach lengths, this reduced the damage. The engine of the second train ploughed into the back of the guard's van of the first train, causing it to cut 14 feet (4.3 m) into the next carriage while the third carriage mounted the second carriage to a distance of about 8 feet (2.4 m).

== Casualties ==
Four passengers, three young women and a child, were killed and 22 were injured.

== Aftermath ==
The Inquest jury found Carter was negligent in approaching the station too fast, though also criticising the lack of fixed signals at a station where five passenger trains met. Carter was then acquitted of manslaughter in the Christchurch Supreme Court, but was dismissed after a Royal Commission of Inquiry found he was negligent in not observing the regulations governing an approach to a station. But he was "scapegoat for a railway system suffering from severe growing pains, using operational methods that had not kept pace with increased traffic" (Conly & Stewart, page 77).

The accident led to the fitting of air brakes to rolling stock and improved signalling. Only the locomotives (U^{B} class) had been fitted with air brakes, with hand-operated brakes in the guard's van at the rear, and Rakaia station had no fixed signals.

So Westinghouse Continuous Air Brakes were fitted to rolling stock, and interlocking signals installed, plus Tyer's tablet machines on single lines (most NZR lines were single track).

While improvements were on the way (and the first signals engineer (H. J. Wynne) was appointed in 1900), the accident contributed to the remarkably rapid expansion of Tyer's block (tablet) working from 1901.
