= Country town icons =

Country town icons may refer to:

- Australia's big things, country town icons in Australia
- List of New Zealand's big things, country town icons in New Zealand
