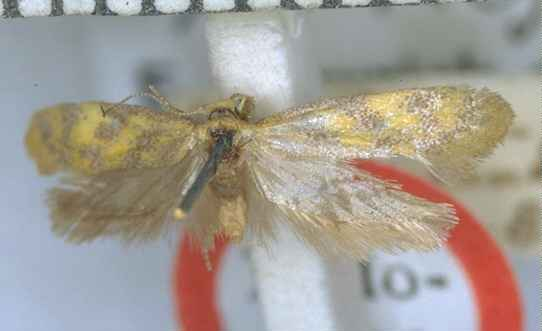
- Male holotype

Scientific classification
- Kingdom: Animalia
- Phylum: Arthropoda
- Class: Insecta
- Order: Lepidoptera
- Family: Oecophoridae
- Genus: Tingena
- Species: T. hoplodesma

Binomial name
- Tingena hoplodesma (Meyrick, 1883)

Synonyms
- Oecophora hoplodesma Meyrick, 1883; Borkhausenia hoplodesma (Meyrick, 1883); Borkhausenia thranias Meyrick, 1905

= Tingena hoplodesma =

Species of moth, endemic to New Zealand

Tingena hoplodesma is a species of moth in the family Oecophoridae. It is endemic to New Zealand and has been found in the North and South Islands. T. hoplodesma prefers native beech forest habitat and adults are on the wing from January to March.

== Taxonomy ==
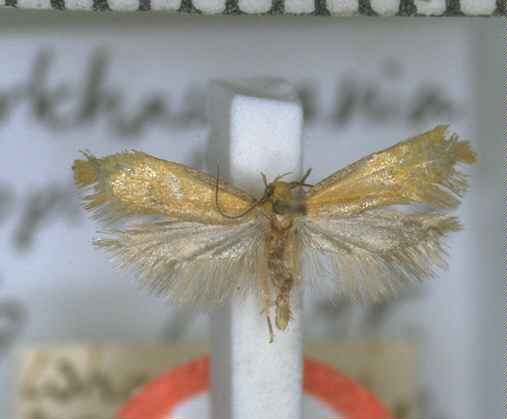
Holotype of Borkhausenia thranias now known as T. hoplodesma.

This species was first described by Edward Meyrick in 1883 using specimens collected at South Rakaia in March by W. H. Gaze. Meyrick originally named the species Oecophora hoplodesma. Meyrick went on to give a fuller description of the species in 1884. In 1915 Meyrick placed this species within the Borkhausenia genus. In 1926 Alfred Philpott studied the genitalia of the male of this species. In that publication Philpott also synonymised Borkhausenia thranias with Borkhausenia hoplodesma. George Hudson discussed this species under the name Borkhausenia hoplodesma in his 1928 publication The butterflies and moths of New Zealand. In 1988 J. S. Dugdale placed this species in the genus Tingena. The male holotype specimen is held at the Natural History Museum, London.

== Description ==
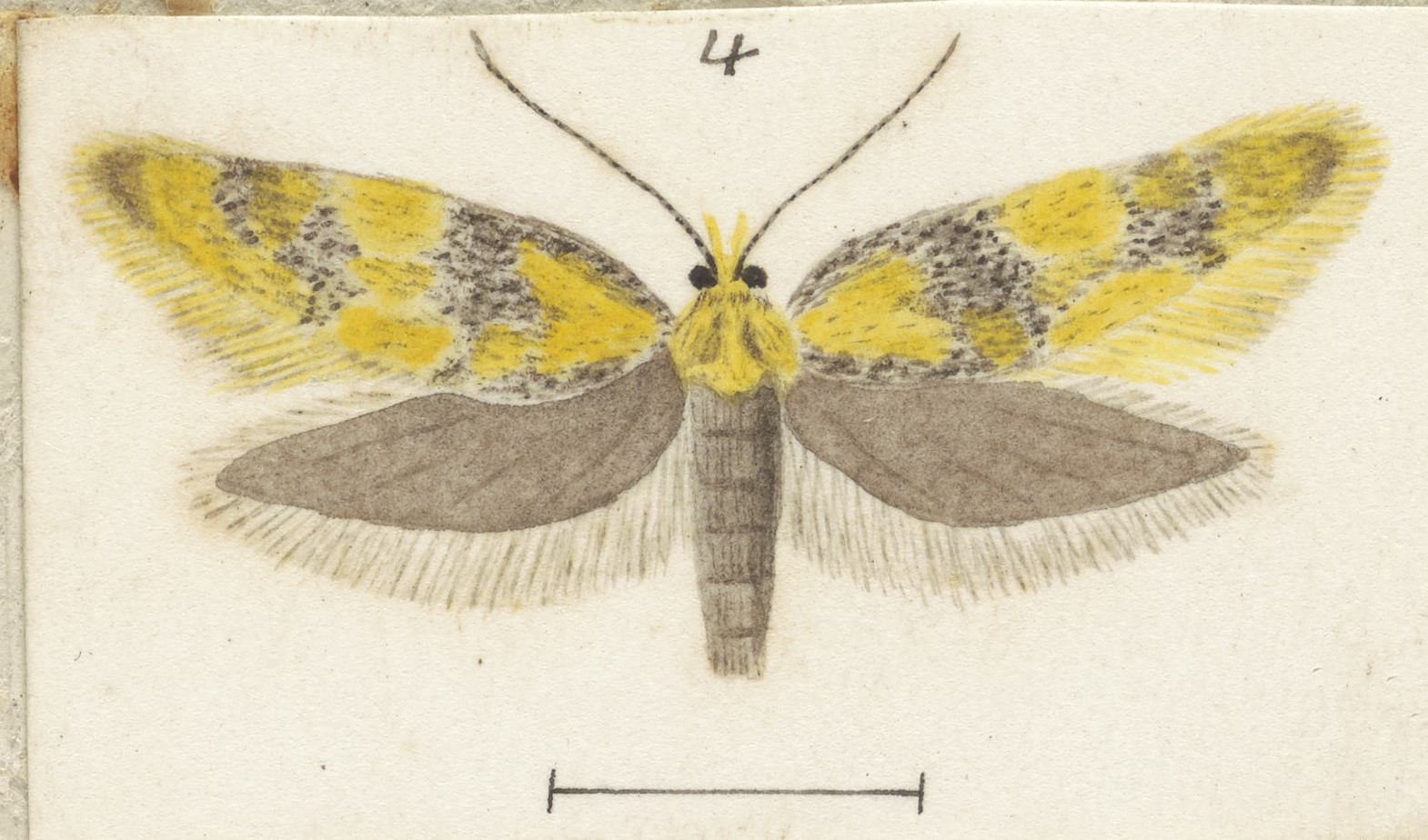
Illustration of T. hoplodesma by George Hudson.

Meyrick originally described this species as follows:

Fore wings narrow, pale yellow, anterior half of costa, three oblique fasciae and a hind marginal streak grey; hind wings grey.

Meyrick went on to describe the species in more detail as follows:

Male. — 12 1/2 mm. Head and palpi light yellow. Antennae dark fuscous. Thorax light yellow, mixed with fuscous grey. Abdomen whitish-grey. Legs dark grey, hairs of posterior tibiae and apex of all tarsal joints whitish. Forewings elongate, narrow, costa moderately arched, apex round-pointed, hindmargin extremely obliquely rounded; light yellow, somewhat deeper in disc; markings very pale whitish-grey, closely irrorated with dark grey scales; a streak along anterior half of costa; a cloudy spot on inner margin near base; a narrow oblique transverse fascia from 1/4 of costa to before middle of inner margin, and a second from middle of costa to 3/4 of inner margin, both slightly interrupted below middle; a third, less oblique, from 3/4 of costa to anal angle, obscurely connected with second near inner margin; an irregular streak along hindmargin : cilia light yellow, with numerous lines of grey points. Hindwings grey; cilia whitish-grey, base slightly darker.

The grey bands of this species are variable, with some specimens having indistinct bands or them even being absent or sometimes replaced with grey speckling.

== Distribution ==
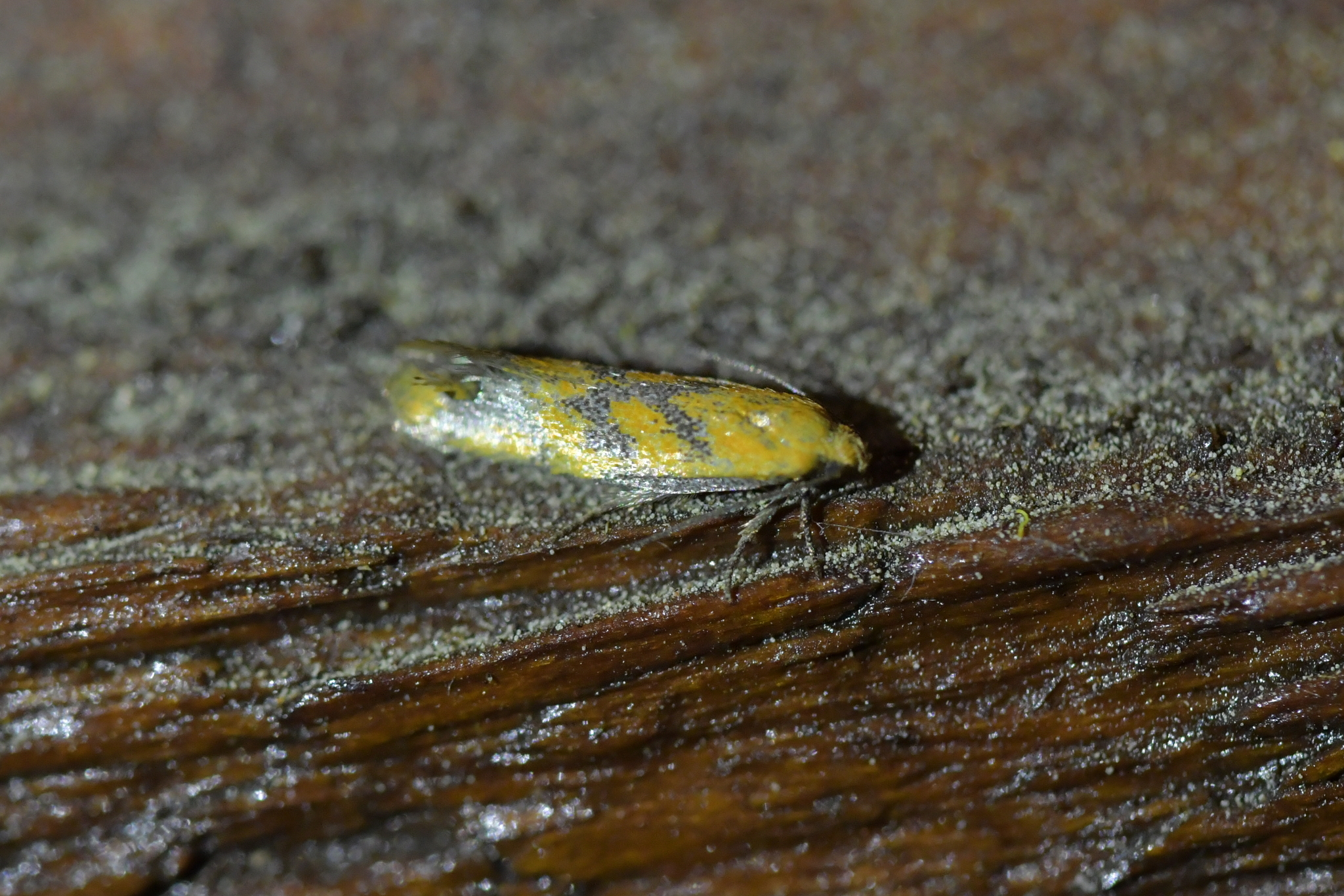
Observation of T. hoplodesma

This species is endemic to New Zealand and has occurred in Whangārei, Kapiti Island, Nelson, Rakaia, Prices Valley, Canterbury, Dunedin and Lake Wakatipu.

== Behaviour ==
The adults of this species are on the wing between January and March.

== Habitat ==
T. hoplodesma prefers native beech forest habitat.
