= Gore trout statue =

Outdoor sculpture in Gore, New Zealand

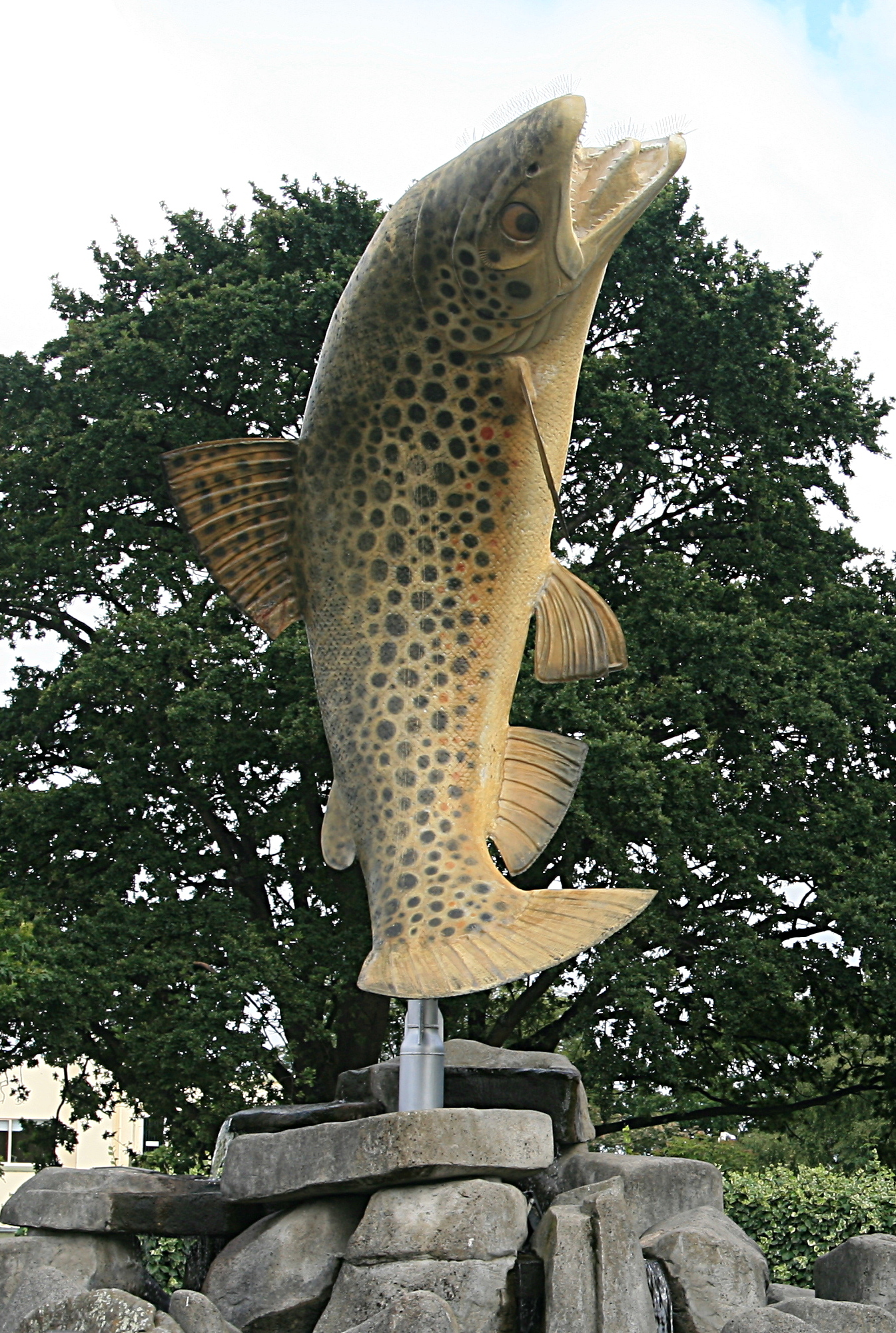
- The statue in 2008
- Artist: Erroll Allison
- Year: 1989
- Dimensions: 6.5 m (21 ft)
- Location: Gore, New Zealand; 46°05′55″S 168°56′50″E

The Gore trout statue, known as Trevor since 2026, is a 6.5-metre-tall (21 ft) statue of a brown trout in the New Zealand town of Gore. It was unveiled in 1989 and funded by the local Lions Club to celebrate its 25th birthday.

== Description ==
The 6.5-metre-tall (21 ft) statue depicts a brown trout (Salmo trutta), an introduced species commonly caught in the Gore area. It was designed by local signwriter and artist Erroll Allison, who also designed the gold guitar statue that sat in the middle of Gore, and has a fibreglass exterior and a polystyrene and mesh interior.

== History ==
The statue was unveiled in February 1989 by Sir Bob Jones, two years before the salmon statue in Rakaia was installed. Gore's trout statue was funded by the local Lions Club as a way to celebrate its 25th birthday. The trout was refurbished in 2017, paid for by Gore District Council.

In July 2025, in response to Gore residents being told not to drink tap water due to high levels of nitrate, Greenpeace activists placed crosses on the eyes of the trout. They also changed the nearby "Welcome to Gore" sign so that it read "Welcome to Gore – where dirty dairy wrecked the water". Federated Farmers described it as vandalism and requested that Greenpeace lose its charitable status, denying that dairy farming had caused the water issues. Greenpeace responded by calling the group "science deniers" and stated that there were scientific studies linking the water issues to the farming. The police did not charge anyone because of a lack of permanent damage.

In early 2026 a competition was created to name the statue, to promote the town's On The Fly Festival, a fly fishing festival at the Mataura River. Gore District Council worked with Hokonui FM on the competition, which involved taking suggestions from the public, and having the public vote on the names. The five finalists were Trixie, Scout, Trevor, Gordon and Finn. One suggestion was Trouty McTroutface, an example of a Mcface spoof. The name "Trevor" received over a third of the votes and was announced the winner at the festival in February 2026.

== In popular culture ==
A 2021 article of Critic Te Ārohi, the magazine of Otago University Students' Association, hypothesised what a fight between Rakaia's salmon statue and Gore's trout statue would look like. The article suggested that Gore's trout statue would win the battle.

== See also ==
- List of New Zealand's big things
- Rakaia salmon statue
