= South Acton =

South Acton may refer to:

== Places ==
- South Acton, London, England
  - South Acton (ward)
- South Acton, Massachusetts, an area of Acton, Massachusetts, United States

== Transportation ==
- South Acton station (MBTA), in Acton, Massachusetts, United States
- South Acton railway station (England), in South Acton, London, England

== See also ==
- Acton (disambiguation)
- Acton station (disambiguation)
