= Rakaia salmon statue =

Sculpture in New Zealand

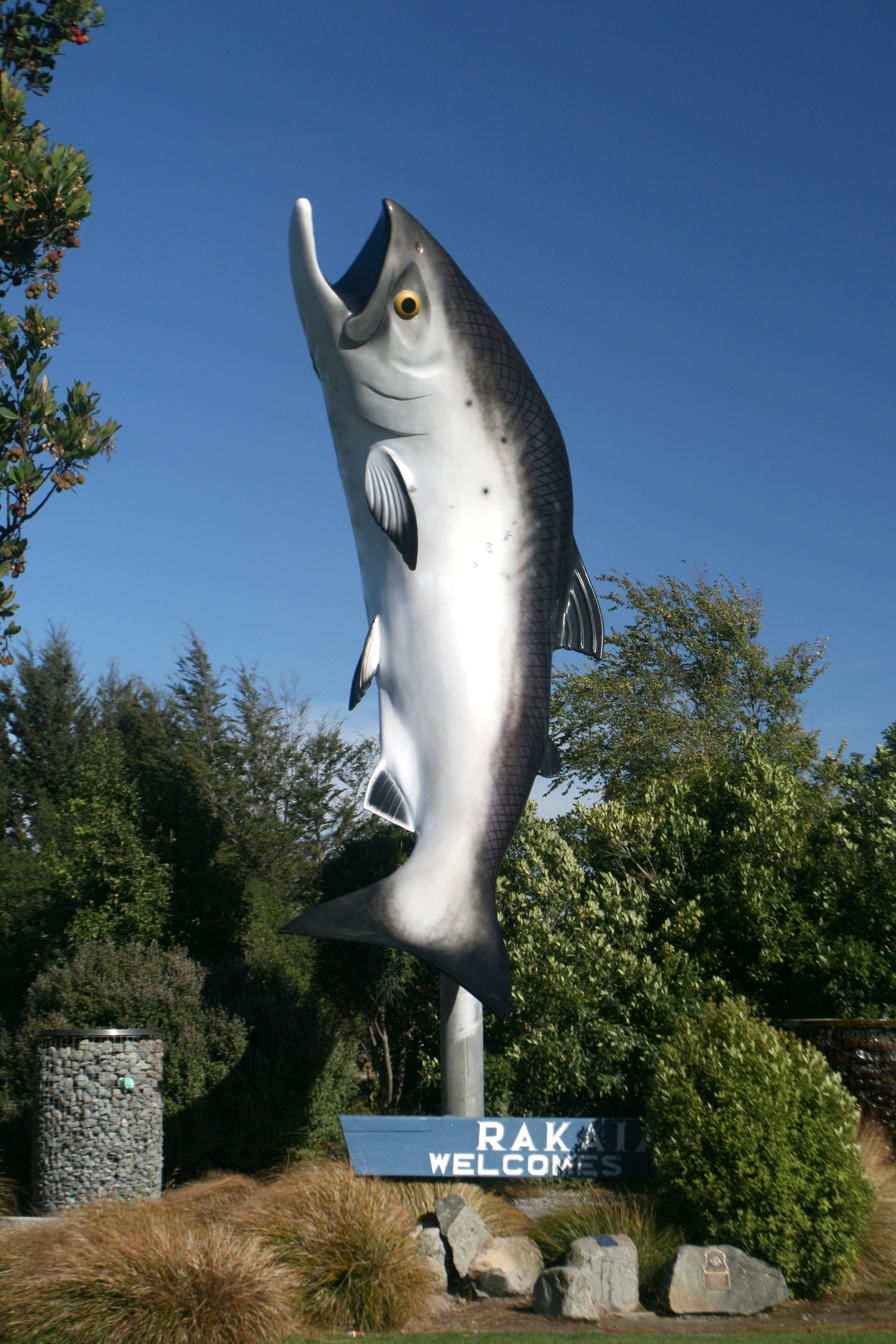
- The statue in 2012
- Artist: Phil Price
- Year: 1991
- Dimensions: 12 m (39 ft)
- Weight: 1.3 tonnes (1.4 short tons)
- Location: Rakaia, Canterbury, New Zealand; 43°45′20″S 172°01′31″E

The Rakaia salmon statue is a 12-metre-tall (39 ft) sculpture of a salmon in the New Zealand town of Rakaia. Located beside State Highway 1, it was built in 1991 by the sculptor Phil Price, with funding from the local Lions Club. Since 2005, Ashburton District Council has owned the sculpture.

== Description ==
The salmon statue is 12 metres (39 ft) tall and weighs 1.6 tonnes. It is located next to State Highway 1 in the town of Rakaia. The sculpture was designed by the sculptor Phil Price.

== History ==
Rakaia's salmon statue was built in 1991 at a cost of $44,483. It was funded by the community's Lions Club and designed by the sculptor Phil Price. In 2005, the Ashburton District Council was gifted the sculpture and the salmon was refurbished. In 2020 and 2021, the area surrounding the fish was redeveloped.

In June 2024, the council approved a restoration of the sculpture, costing approximately $300,000, after an assessment found that a lot of refurbishment work on the statue was required. The sculpture was moved to Price's workshop in December 2025 for the restoration, which involved a repaint and repairs to the structure's fibreglass. The salmon was reinstalled beside State Highway 1 in February 2026.

After Gore's giant trout statue was given a name (Trevor) in February 2026, Toni Durham of Ashburton District Council stated that there were no plans to name Rakaia's statue.

In February 2026, Greenpeace activists used tape and paper to cover each of the salmon's eyes with black cross ("X") marks to make the fish appear to be dead. They also placed a speech bubble sign on one of the fins to make the fish state that "Fonterra killed my family". Will Appelbe, a Greenpeace freshwater activist, stated that the move was motivated by the decreasing numbers of salmon in the area and said that "The blame for the lack of salmon sits squarely with the dirty dairy industry." Ashburton District Council Mayor Liz McMillan described this act as "disappointing". It cost the council $998 (excluding GST) to remove the attachments, and a man was subsequently expected to appear in court on 30 June 2026, charged with vandalising the sculpture.

== In popular culture ==
A 2021 article of Critic Te Ārohi, the magazine of Otago University Students' Association, hypothesised what a fight between Rakaia's salmon statue and Gore's trout statue would look like. The article suggested that Gore's trout sculpture would win the battle.

== See also ==
- Gore trout statue
- List of New Zealand's big things
