= Acton Green =

Acton Green may refer to:

- Acton Green, Herefordshire
- Acton Green, London
