= Acton station =

Acton station may refer to the following stations:

== Acton, London, England ==
- Acton Central railway station (originally known as just Acton), a London Overground station on the Mildmay line (formerly the North and South Western Junction Railway)
- Acton Green station, the former name of Chiswick Park tube station, a London Underground station on the District line
- Acton Main Line railway station (originally known as just Acton), an Elizabeth line station on the Great Western Main Line
- Acton Town tube station, a London Underground station on the District and Piccadilly lines
- East Acton tube station, a London Underground station on the Central line
- North Acton tube station, a London Underground station on the Central line, and a former Great Western Railway station on the New North Main Line (Acton–Northolt Line)
- South Acton railway station, a London Overground station on the Mildmay line, and a former London Underground station on a spur of the District line
- West Acton tube station, a London Underground station on the Central line's branch to Ealing Broadway

== Elsewhere ==
- Acton Bridge railway station, on the West Coast Main Line in Acton, Cheshire, England
- Acton GO Station, a GO Transit station on the Kitchener line in Acton, Ontario, Canada
- South Acton station, an MBTA Commuter Rail station on the Fitchburg Line, Acton, Massachusetts, United States
- West Acton station, a former commuter rail station on the Fitchburg Line, Acton, Massachusetts, U.S.
- Vincent Grade/Acton station, a Metrolink station on the Antelope Valley Line in Acton, California, United States

== See also ==
- Acton (disambiguation)
- South Acton (disambiguation)
