= List of New Zealand's big things =

The big things of New Zealand are large novelty statues located in many small towns across the country which typically relate to the town and its identity. Examples include the Taihape gumboot, in a town which has an annual gumboot-throwing contest; the large L&P bottle in Paeroa, the town where the drink originated, and the Big Sheep Shearer in Te Kūiti, where the national sheep-shearing competitions are held. A similar tradition is found in Australia.

== List of big things ==
=== North Island ===
Name	Location	Built	Size	Notes	Image
Big Apple	Waitomo Caves		7.5 m (25 ft)	The logo of the Big Apple Cafe.	
Giant Bikes	Taupō and Tūrangi	2012	3 m (9.8 ft)	Two giant bicycles to promote the region as a cycling destination and alert vehicles to the shared road policy	
Big Bull	Bulls		4 m (13 ft)	A large Bull, signifying the importance of bulls to Bulls.	
Big Carrot	Ohakune	1984	7.5 m (25 ft)	This big carrot is at the entrance to the town Ohakune, recognising the importance of market gardening to the local economy. The carrot was originally a fibreglass prop used in an ANZ Bank commercial that was acquired by the town and officially unveiled by the Prime Minister in 1984.	
Big Cow	Hāwera	1996		Known as Olive, the big cow statue has stood outside the Fonterra plant in Whareroa (near Hāwera) since December 1996.	
Mega Cow	Morrinsville	2017	6.5 m	A large cow, to acknowledge the area's thriving dairy farming industry.	
Big Dairy Whip	Tatuanui			A giant can of Tatua Dairy Whip at the site of the Tatua Dairy Company factory.	
Big Gumboot	Taihape	2000		A giant metal gumboot made from corrugated iron. Represents Taihape as the "Gumboot Capital of the World".	
Jandal On The Mandel	Between Kopu and Thames.			A giant jandal, alongside the Hauraki Rail Trail, on the Coromandel Peninsula. By artist Ricks Terstappen.	
Big Jandals	Whatawhata	2019		Found at the Whatawhata berry farm just outside of Hamilton	
Big Kiwi	Eketāhuna			Big Kiwi; relocated in 2016.	
Big Kiwifruit	Te Puke			Part of the Kiwi360 complex.	
Big Kiwis	Ōtorohanga			Several corrugated-iron kiwis are located around the town, the self-proclaimed capital of Kiwiana.	
Big Kowhai	Napier	2014	4 m (13 ft)	"The Gold of the Kowhai" is a bronze gilded sculpture by artist Paul Dibble	
Big Lemon & Paeroa bottle	Paeroa	1967	7 m (23 ft)	A large soft drink bottle; L&P or Lemon & Paeroa.	
Big Loaf	Manaia			The town is 'New Zealand's Bread Capital' – Yarrows Family Bakers, one of the last and largest remaining independently owned bakeries, is in Manaia.	
Giant Oystercatcher	Kaiaua	23 January 2005	3.5 m	A large oystercatcher, to represent the shorebirds of the Seabird Coast.	
Big Parsnip, also known as Panorama Parsnip	Ohakune	2017		The sixth vegetable added to the Ohakune Carrot Adventure Park.	
Giant Pencils	Whanganui	2010		"Balancing Act", a sculpture of three large Staedler pencils by artist Daniel Clifford.	
Big Prawn	Taupō			A giant prawn, part of Huka Prawn Park	
Quasi (Big Hand)	Christchurch then Wellington	2016		Located in Christchurch (2016–2019) and then Wellington (2019–2024), then Australia.	
Big Sheep and Sheepdog	Tīrau	1994		Made from corrugated iron, the town's information centre is shaped like a giant dog, with 'the big sheep' housing a large wool outlet.	
Big Sheep Shearer	Te Kūiti			The town promotes itself as the sheep shearing capital of the world and is host to the annual New Zealand National Shearing Championships.	
Big Skateboard / Eke Tahi	Mangawhai	2024	12 m x 3.1m	The world's largest skateboard, commissioned by the New Zealand Olympic Committee to promote awareness of skateboarding being introduced as an Olympic sport at the 2020 Tokyo Olympics.	
Big Surfboard	Ōakura			A surfboard that is 155 years old and is claimed to be the world's biggest.	
Tongue of the dog	Hamilton	2016	8 × 3.5 m	"The Tongue of the Dog" in Hamilton is a large, colourful public sculpture by Michael Parekowhai, gifted in 2016, symbolising the local legend of a dog creating the Waikato River by bringing healing waters from Tongariro, featuring Cuisenaire rods representing biculturalism, education, and new Hamilton narratives	
Big Trout	Taupō			A giant metal trout	

=== South Island ===
Name	Location	Built	Size	Notes	Image
Big Crayfish	Kaikōura			The logo of the Lobster Inn Motel.	
Big Doughnut	Springfield	2007	3.5 m (11 ft)	A doughnut set up to promote The Simpsons Movie.	
The Five Clydesdales	Clinton			A group of (slightly) larger-than-life-sized Clydesdale horses.	
Big Fruit	Cromwell	1989	13 m (43 ft)	An apricot, apple, pear and nectarine.	
Big guitar	Gore			Central Gore has a giant guitar, honouring the town's status as the unofficial capital of country and western music in New Zealand. Designed by local artist Errol Allison, the sculpture's official name is Hands of Fame.	
Harbour Mouth Molars	Dunedin			Sculpture of several molars, sometimes called the Harbour Mouth Molars, in Kitchener Street Reserve.	Harbour Mouth Molars
Big Mosgiel	Mosgiel			Big letters spelling the name of the Dunedin suburb.	
Big Pāua	Riverton	early 1990s		Giant pāua (abalone) shell just past eastern bridge into the town on State Highway 99. Featured in 1998 in a series of postage stamps celebrating New Zealand town icons.	
Big Peanut Butter Jar	Stoke			A big Pic's Peanut Butter jar that stands outside Pic's Peanut Butter World.	
Big Salmon	Rakaia	1991	12 m (39 ft)	A salmon, commonly found in the Rakaia River.	
Big Sandfly	Pukekura			A sandfly mounted outside The Bushmans Centre. No longer present as the centre has shut down.	
Big Sausage	Tuatapere		3 m (10 ft)	A big sausage atop a fork, awarded to the town in September 2015 by the ZM radio show Fletch, Vaughan and Megan.	
Surfer Riding a Wave	Colac Bay			Big statue of surfer riding a wave	
Big Takahe	Te Anau		~ 2.2 m (7.2 ft)	Big statue of the takahē, an endangered, flightless bird indigenous to New Zealand's South Island.	Big Takahe bird statue
Big trout	Gore	1989		A brown trout.	
Big Wheelbarrow	Hokitika			Holds a giant inflatable wild pig during Hokitika's annual Wildfoods Festival.	
Chook Tree	Waianakarua	~1978		An old macrocarpa tree in the shape of giant chicken. Winner of the New Zealand 2025 Tree of the Year. A Moeraki Boulder sits at its feet as an egg.	A macrocarpa tree in the shape of a big chicken

== See also ==
- Australia's big things
- Giants of the Prairies
- List of largest roadside attractions
- Novelty architecture
