= Phil Price (sculptor) =

New Zealand artist

- Born: 14 June 1965 (age 61); Nelson, New Zealand
- Known for: Kinetic sculptures

Phil Price (born 1965) is a New Zealand artist best known for his large-scale kinetic sculptures. Price's work incorporates engineering and design in works inspired by the natural world.

Price received a BFA degree in sculpture from the University of Canterbury School of Fine Arts.

== Public sculptures ==
- Big Snake (2020). Constitution Square, Canberra.
- Liberace (2019). Permanently installed on Waiheke Island, New Zealand.
- Ipomoea (2019). Temporarily installed during the Sculpture by the Sea festival. Cottesloe Beach, Perth, Australia.
- Snake (2013). Temporarily installed during the Sculpture by the Sea festival in Bondi, Sydney, Australia. Acquired by the City of Aarhus, where it is currently installed in the public square Mølleparken.
- Tree of Life. (2013). McClelland Sculpture Park, Langwarrin, Victoria, Australia.
- Journeys (2012). Canberra, Australia. Permanently installed facing the Canberra Airport.
- Flip (2010). Taupō, New Zealand. Permanent commission by the Taupo Sculpture Trust.
- Organism (2009). Wellington, New Zealand. Part of the Victoria University of Wellington permanent collection.
- Dinornis Maximus (2008). Canberra, Australia. Permanently installed on the median strip of Yarra Glen Drive, Woden.
- Knowledge (2006). Christchurch, New Zealand. Permanently installed outside the Upper Riccarton Library in Christchurch.
- Nucleus (2006). Christchurch, New Zealand. Permanently installed at the meeting point of High, Lichfield and Manchester streets.
- Zephyrometer (2004). Evans Bay, Wellington. The work was struck by lightning in 2014, resulting in significant damage. It was repaired and restored the following year.
- Protoplasm (2002). Wellington, New Zealand.
- Rakaia salmon statue (1991). Rakaia, Canterbury, New Zealand.
- Wiggly Wagon and other sculptures (2003), Queen Mary Hospital, Hanmer Springs. Removed in 2005.
- Cytoplasm. Auckland.
- Ratytus. McClelland Sculpture Park, Langwarrin, Victoria, Australia.

== Permanent collections ==
- Museum of New Zealand Te Papa Tongarewa
- Victoria University of Wellington

== Gallery ==
Phil Price sculptures

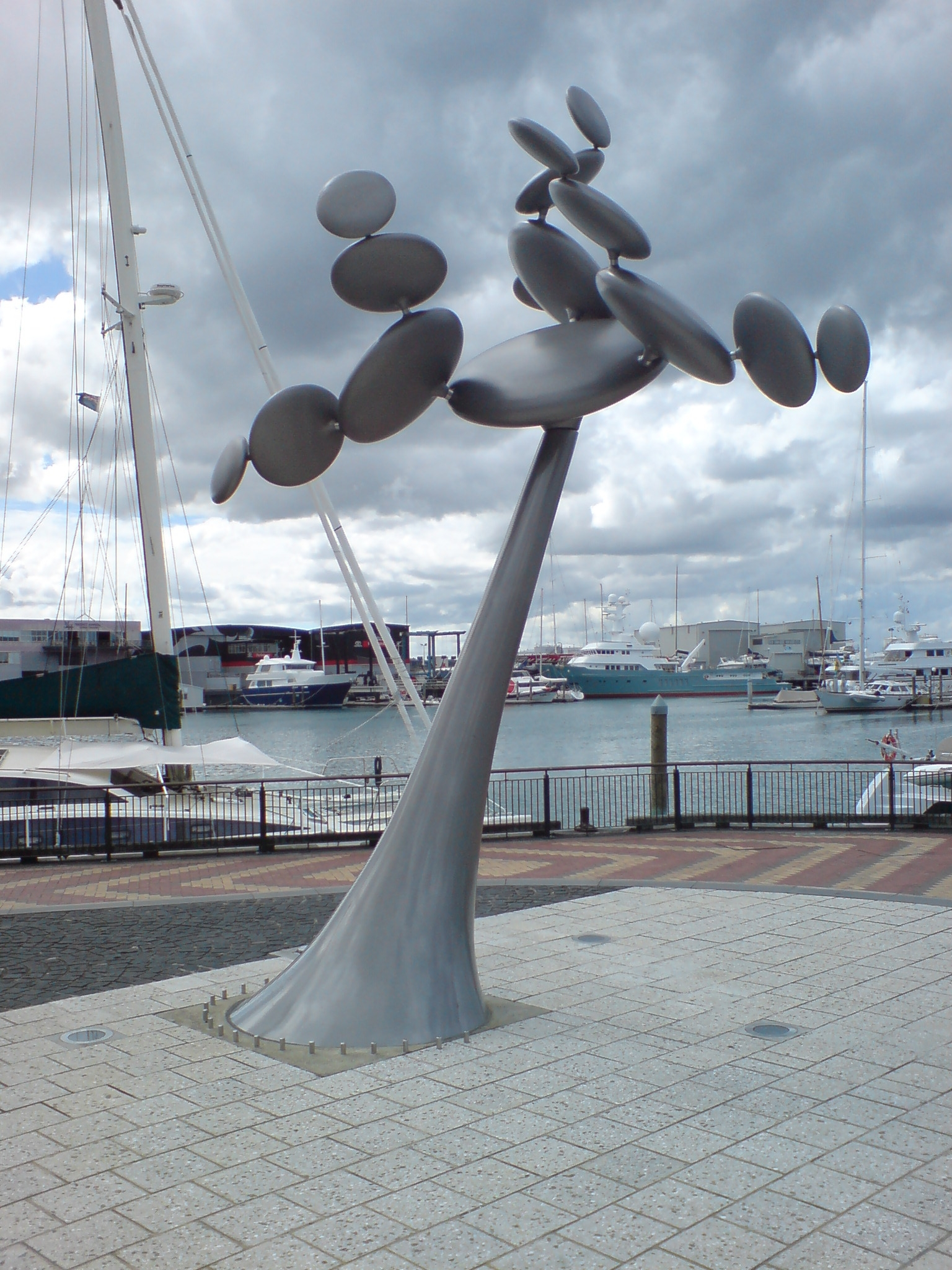
Cytoplasm, Auckland, New Zealand

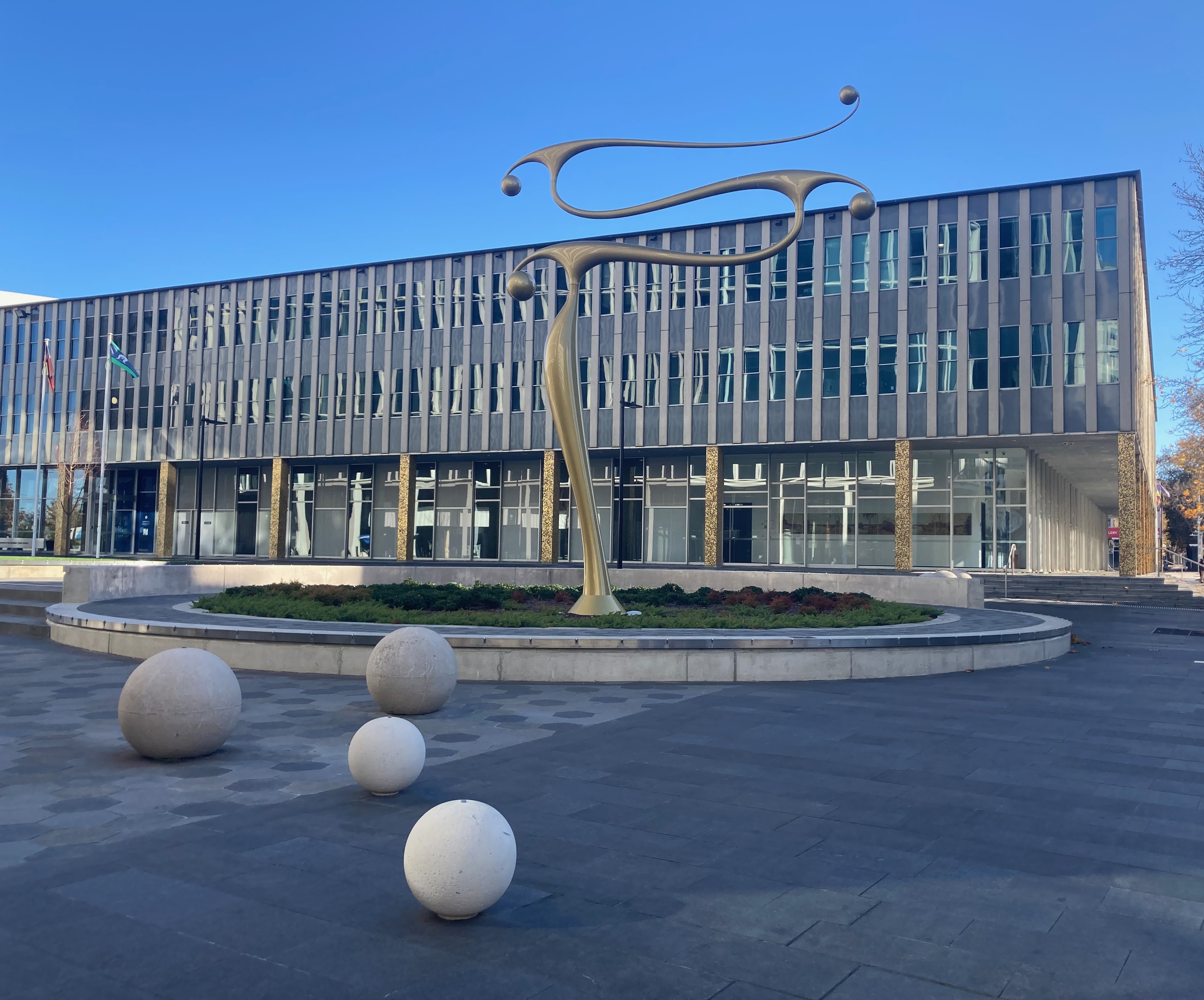
Big Snake, Canberra

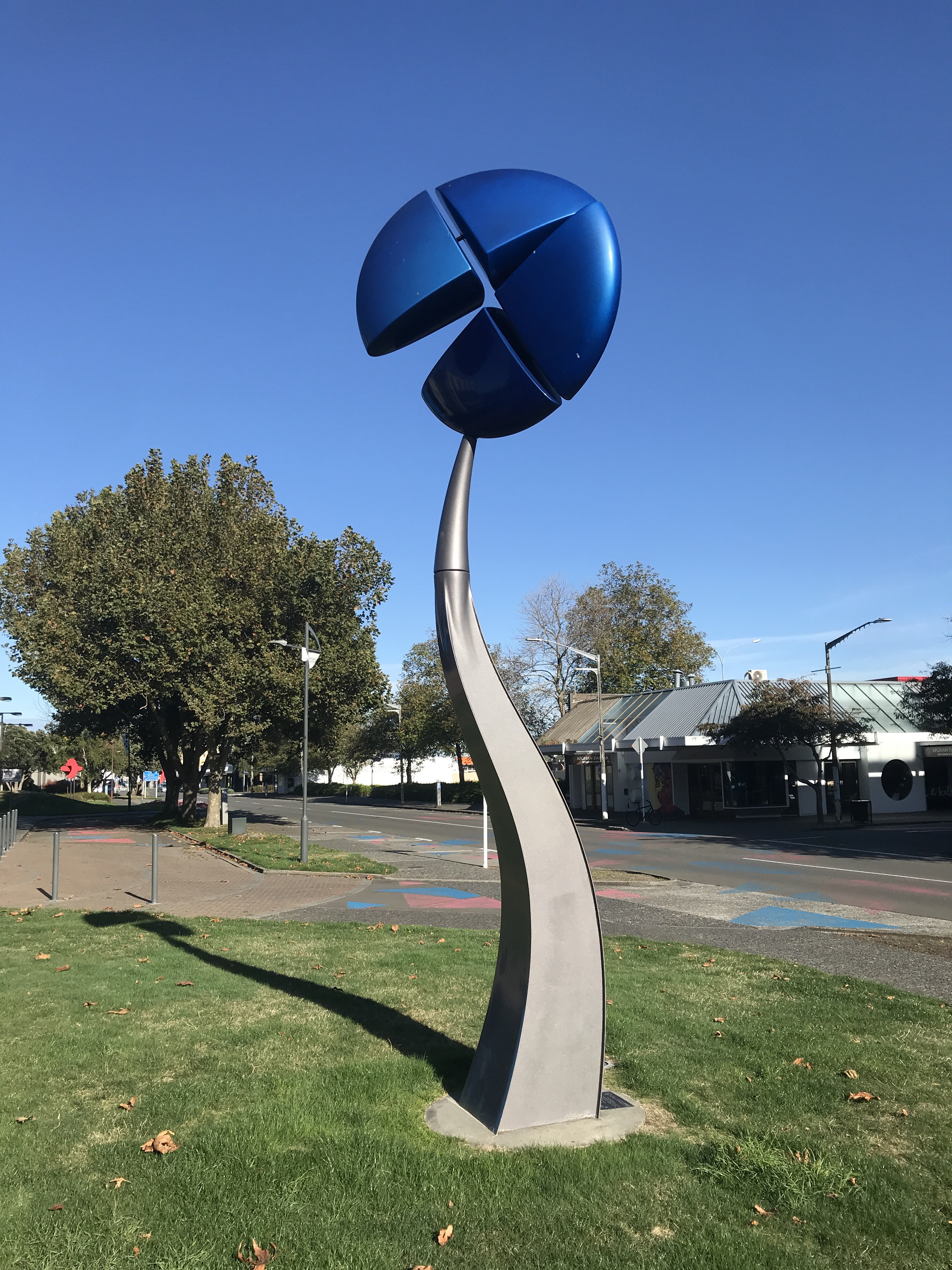
United Divided, Palmerston North

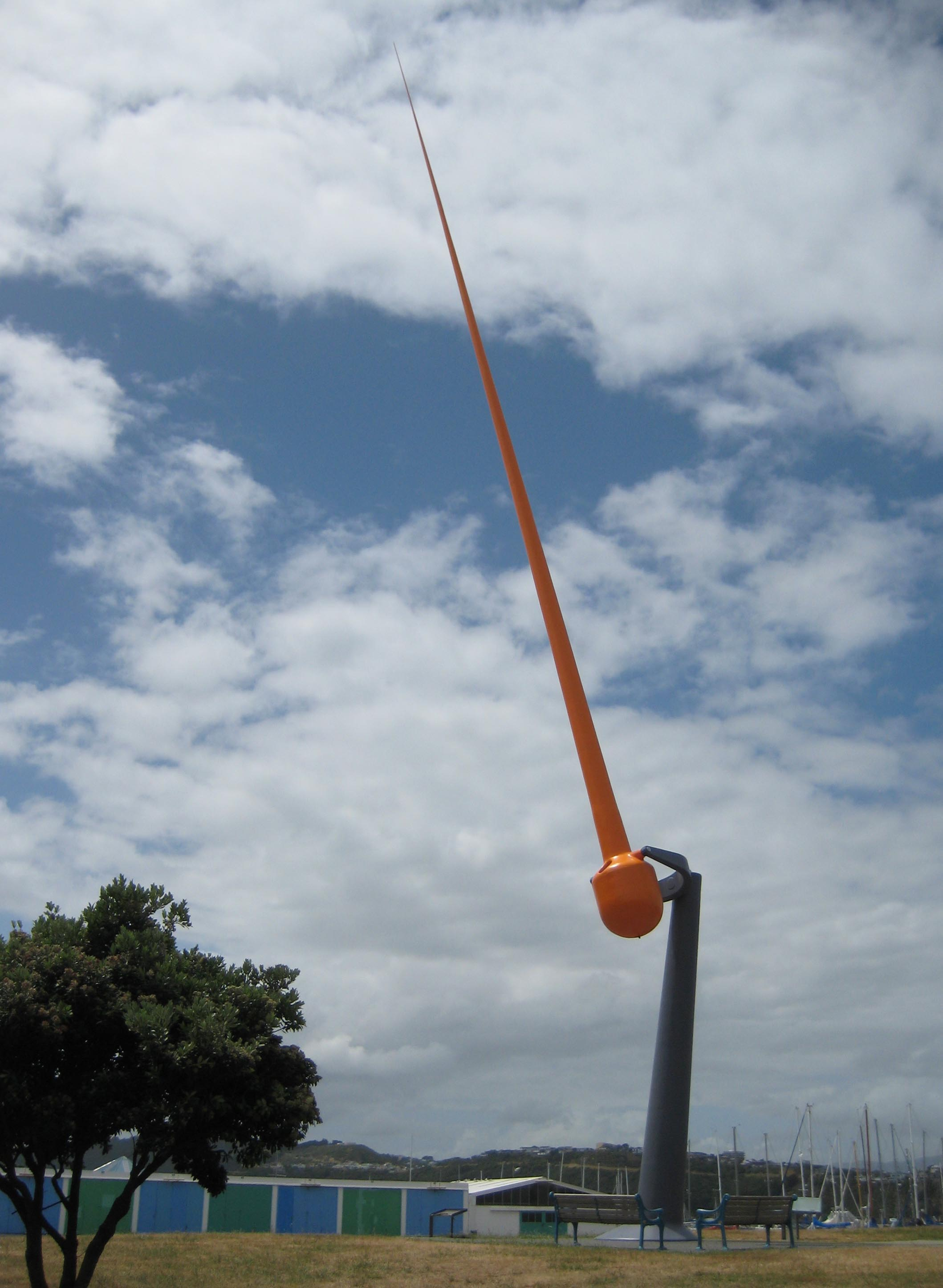
Zephyrometer, Wellington

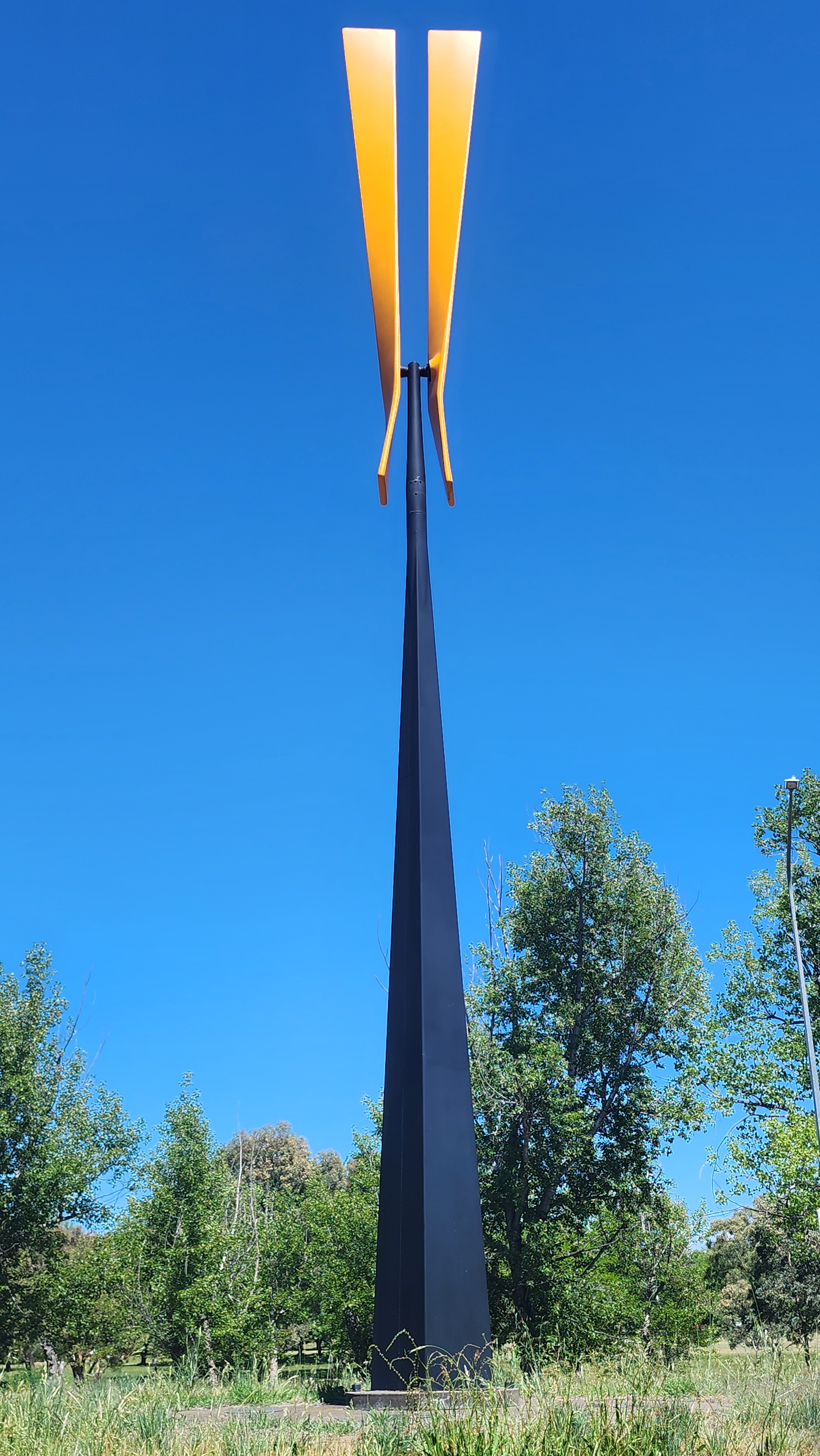
Dinornis Maximus, Canberra (Wind kinetic sculpture)

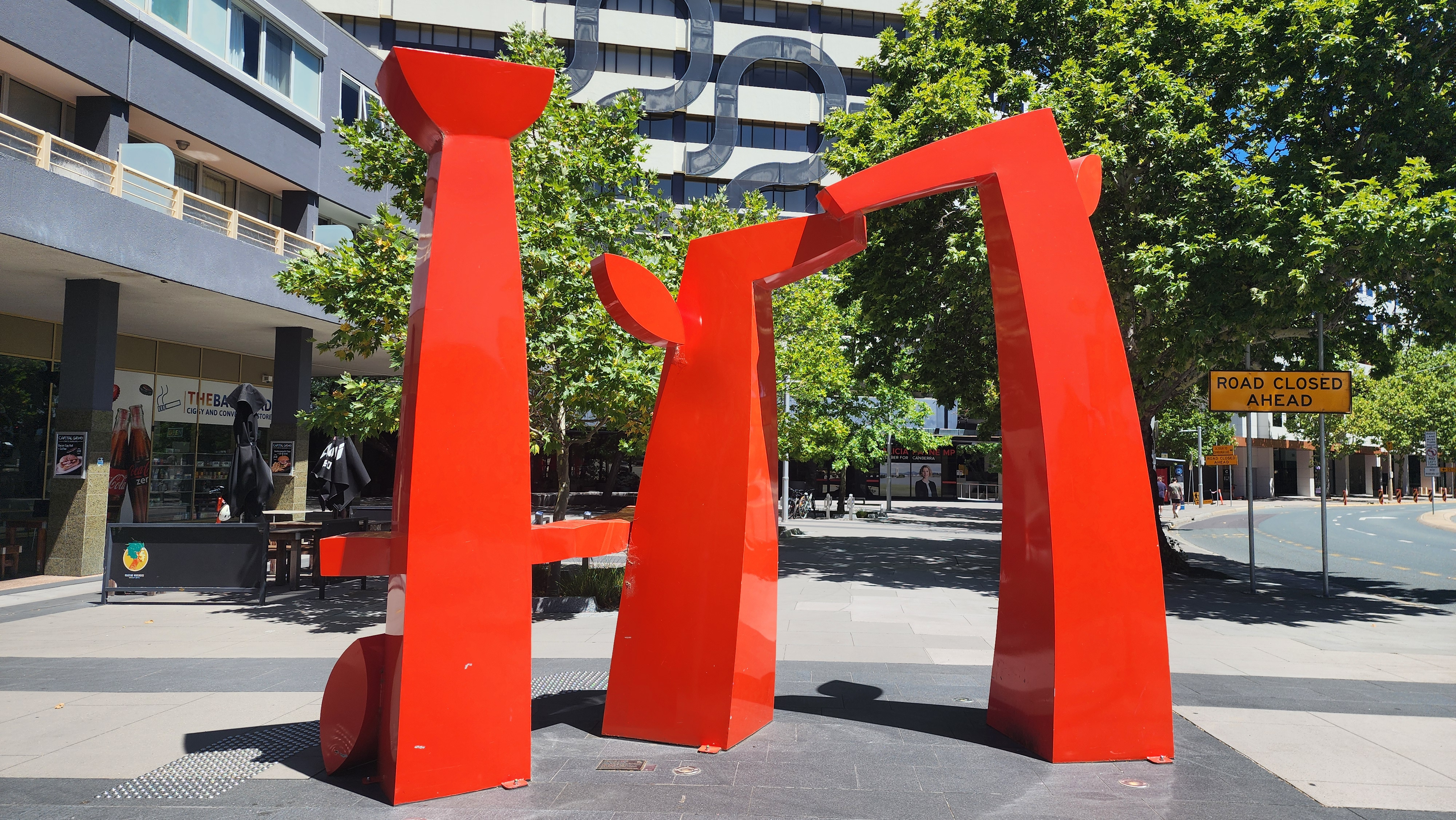
Choice of Passage, London Circuit, Canberra

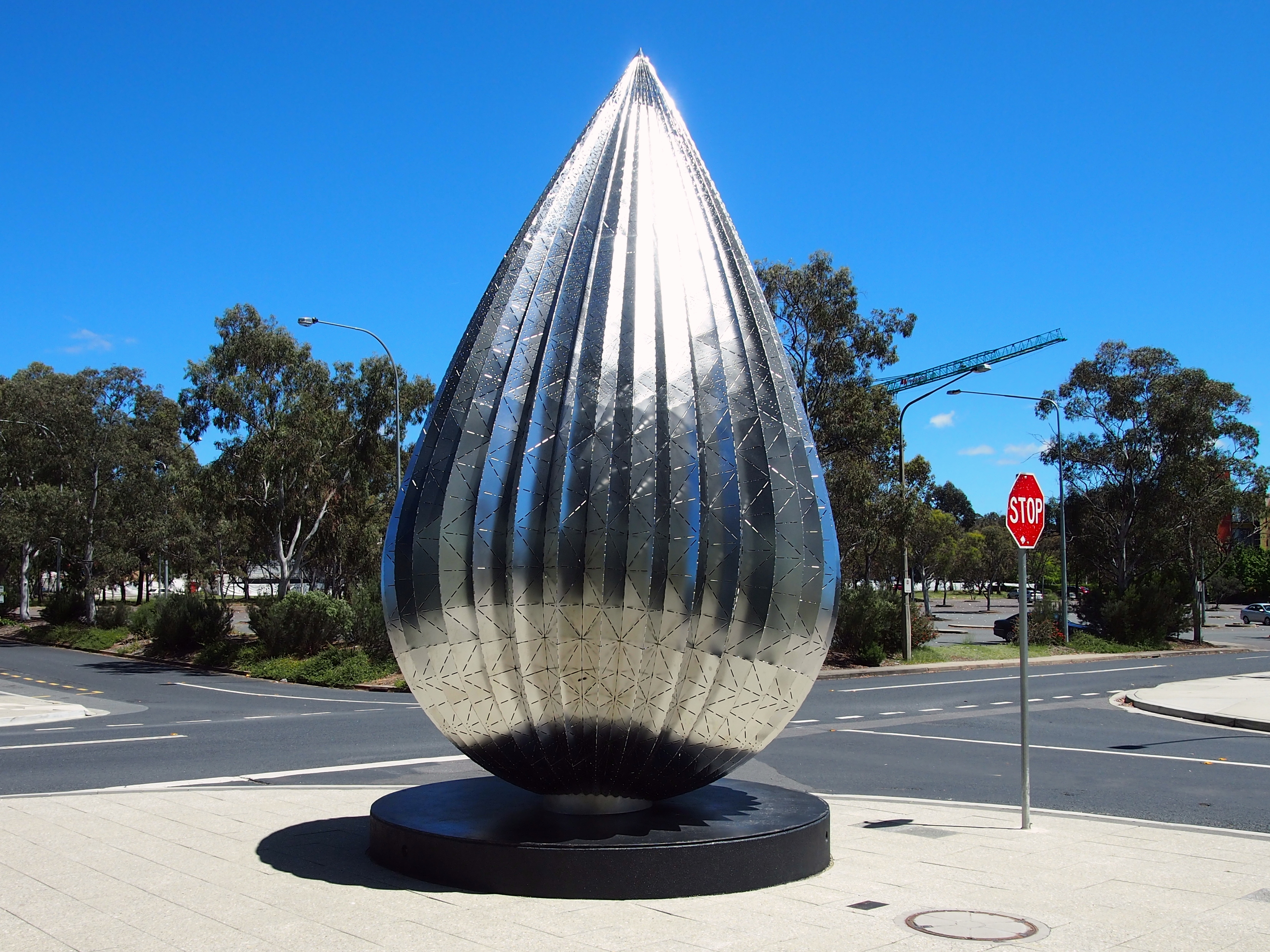
Droplet, Phillip ACT

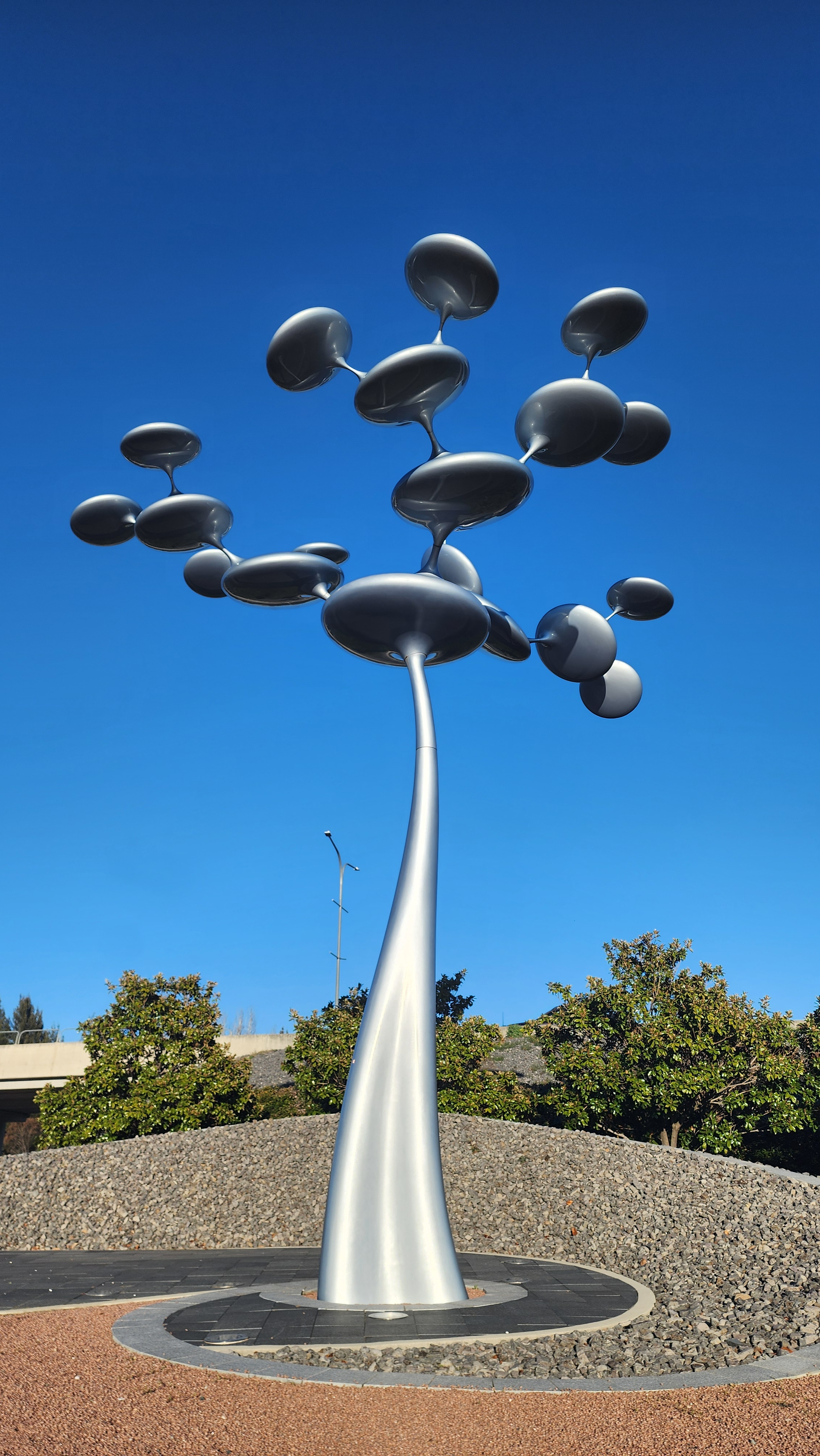
Journeys, Canberra Airport (Wind kinetic sculpture)
