= Zephyrometer =

Statue in Wellington, New Zealand

Coordinates: 41°18′43″S 174°47′46″E

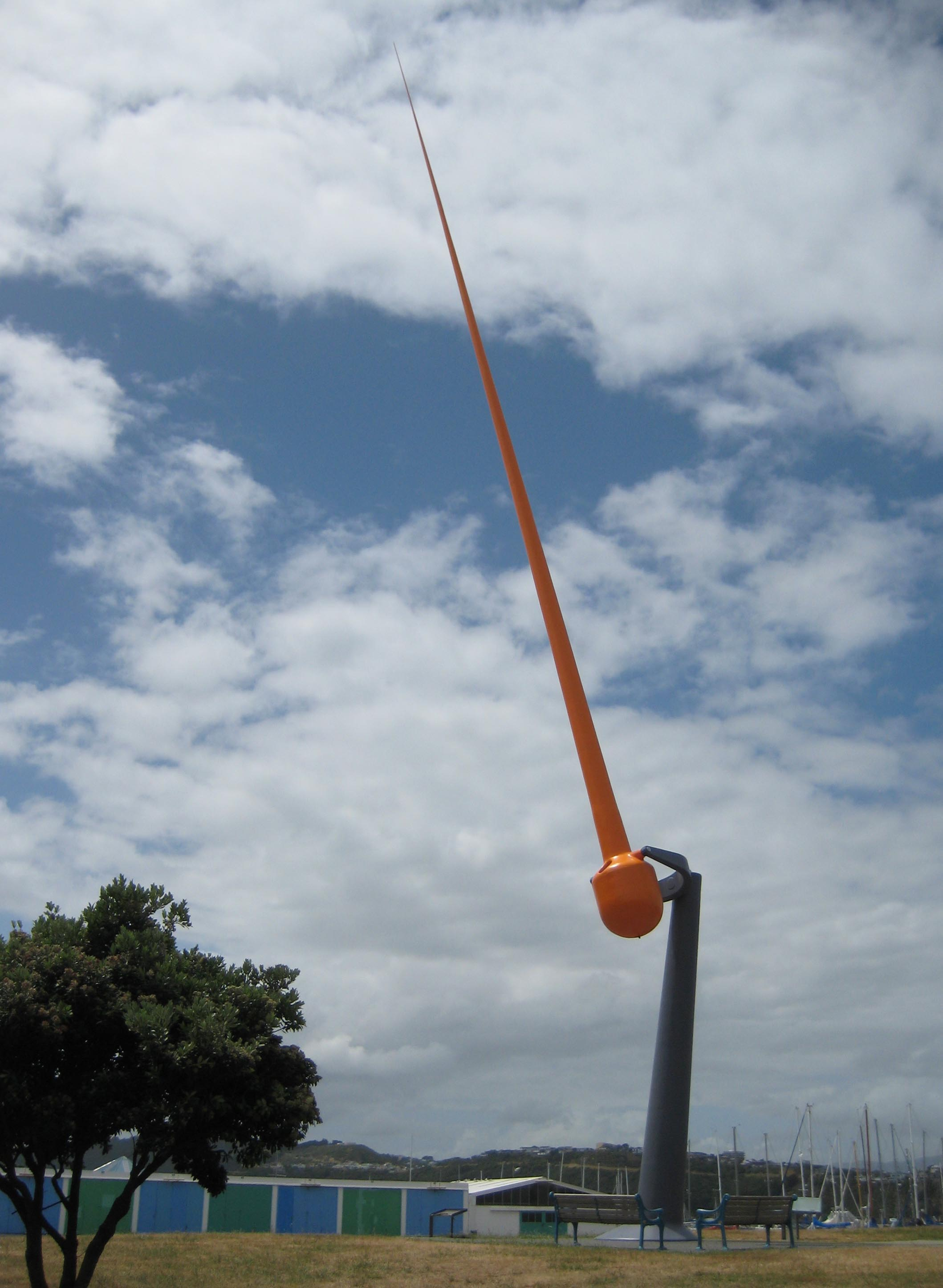
- Artist: Phil Price
- Type: Kinetic art
- Location: Wellington, New Zealand

The Zephyrometer is a public sculpture by Phil Price in Evans Bay, Wellington. The work was installed in 2003. It is a kinetic sculpture consisting of a concrete cylinder holding a 26 metres (85 ft) tall needle which sways to show wind direction and speed. It is sited on Cobham Drive to make use of Wellington's wind. The Zephyrometer was damaged by lightning on August 14, 2014.

Zephyrometer was the second of five major wind sculptures along Cobham Drive commissioned by the Wellington Sculpture Trust over the period 2000 – 2010, which now make up the Meridian Wind Sculpture Walk. The work has attracted international interest, and is a beloved local landmark.

== Lightning strike ==
On 14 August 2014 at approximately 2:30 pm, the Zephyrometer was struck by lightning during a hail storm, leaving the tip of the sculpture frayed. A spokesman for Wellington City Council confirmed that the "needle" was "completely stuffed". Video of the actual lightning strike itself was captured by Solomon Emet and is viewable on YouTube . The sculpture was restored on May 13, 2015, but the new needle was composed of a lighter material which caused the sculpture to bend very low in extremely windy conditions. Additional weight had to be added to the counterbalance.

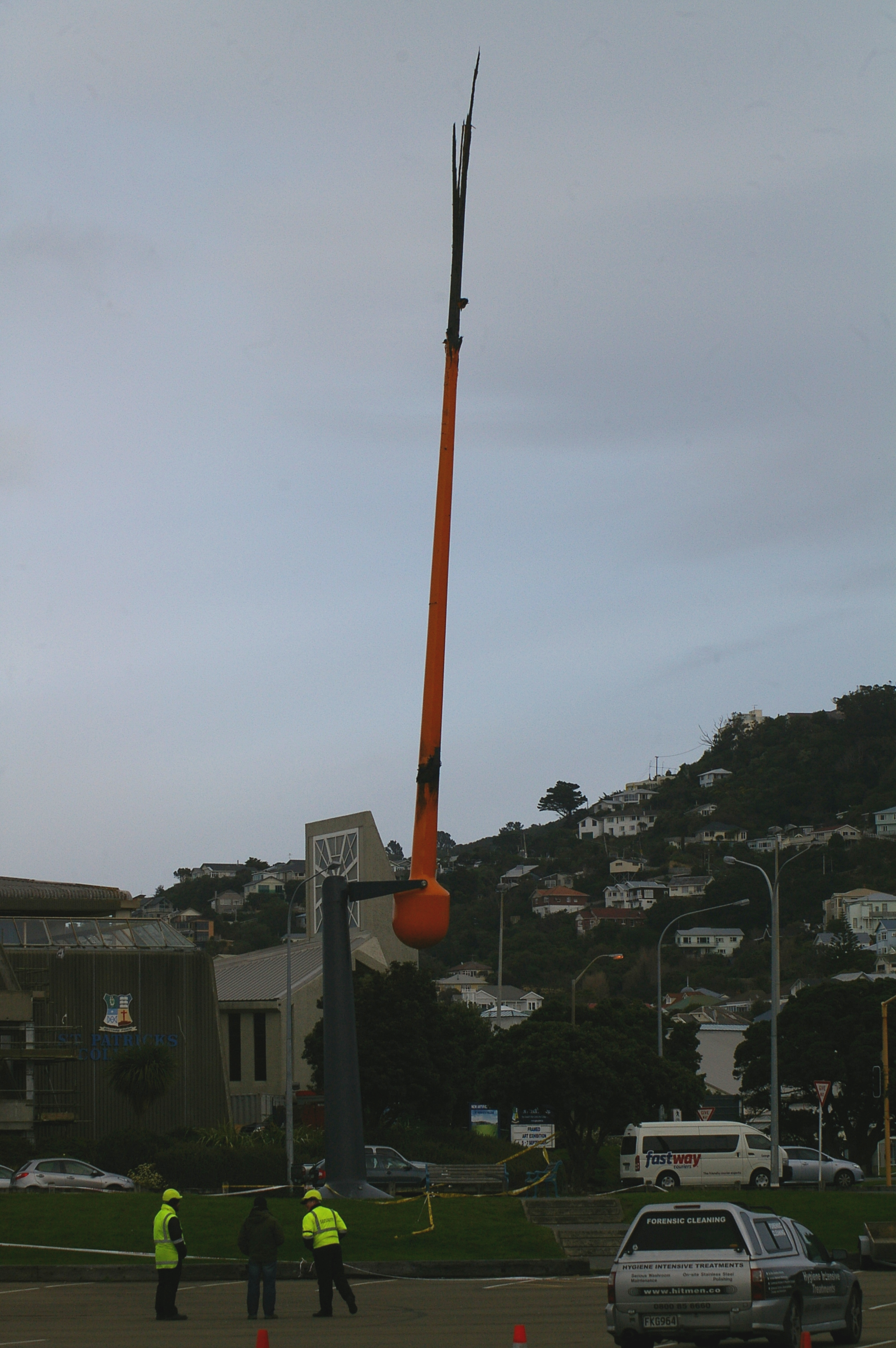
Lightning damage on Zephyrometer

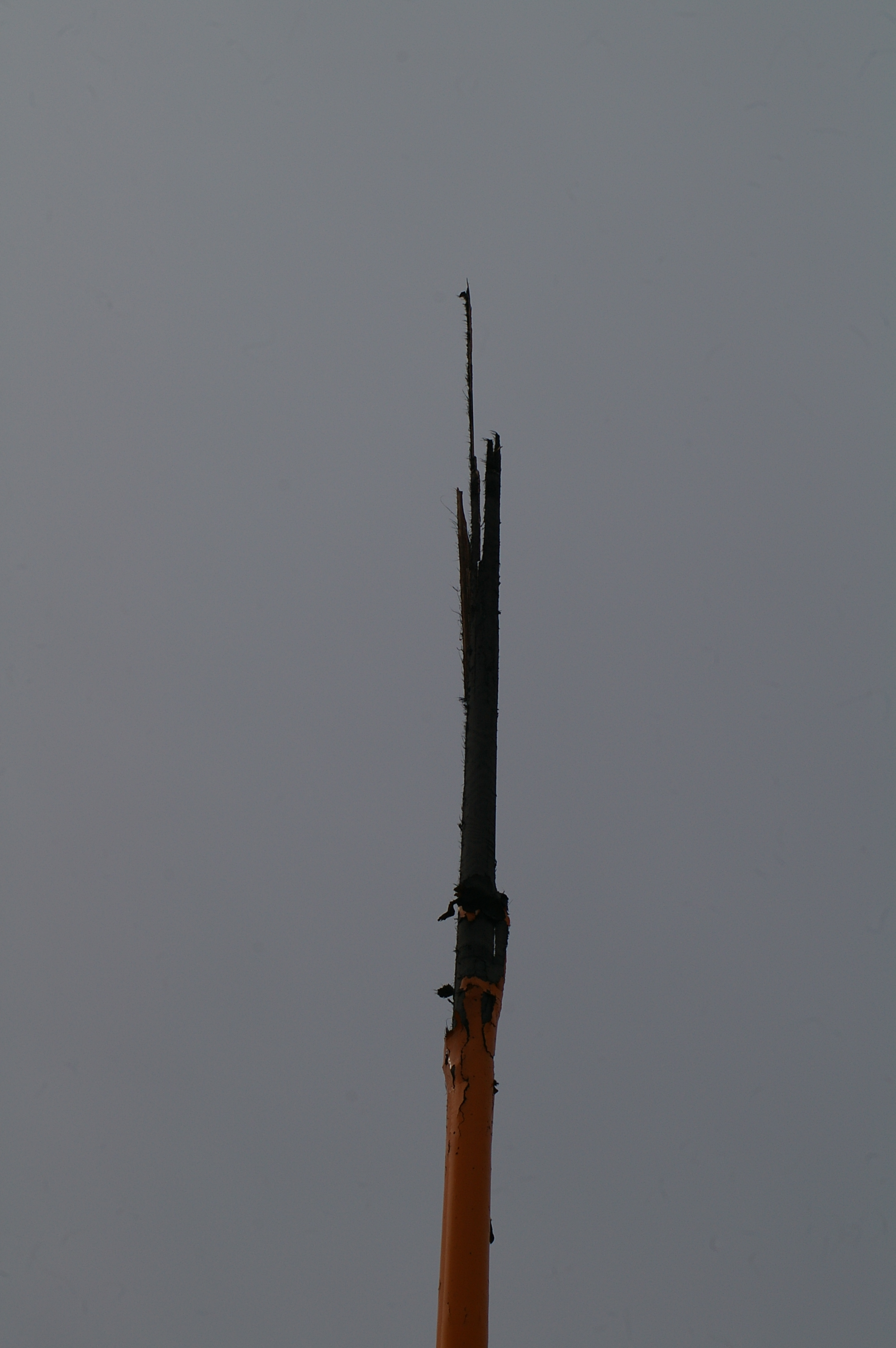
Damage on tip

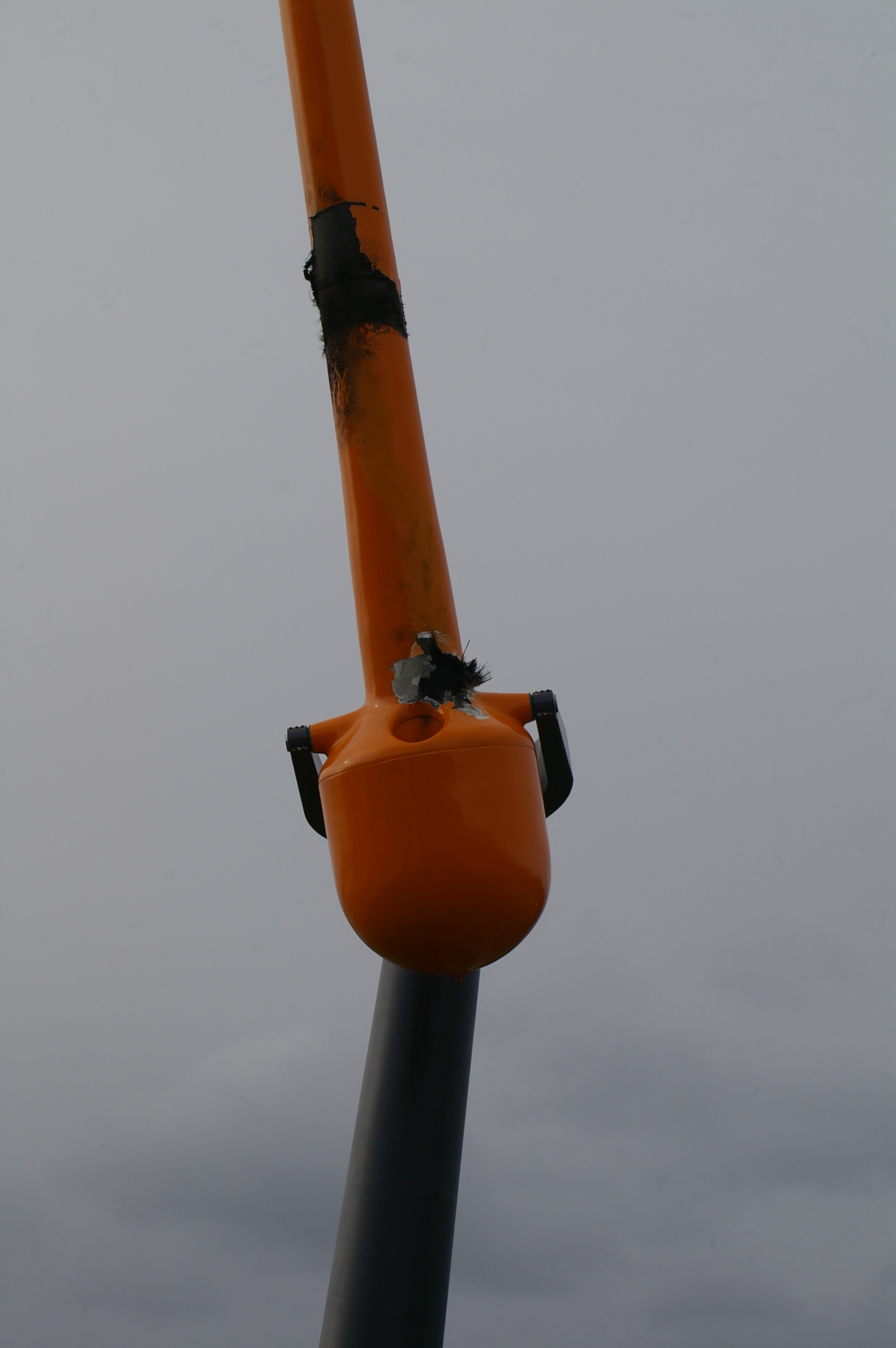
Damage near gimbal

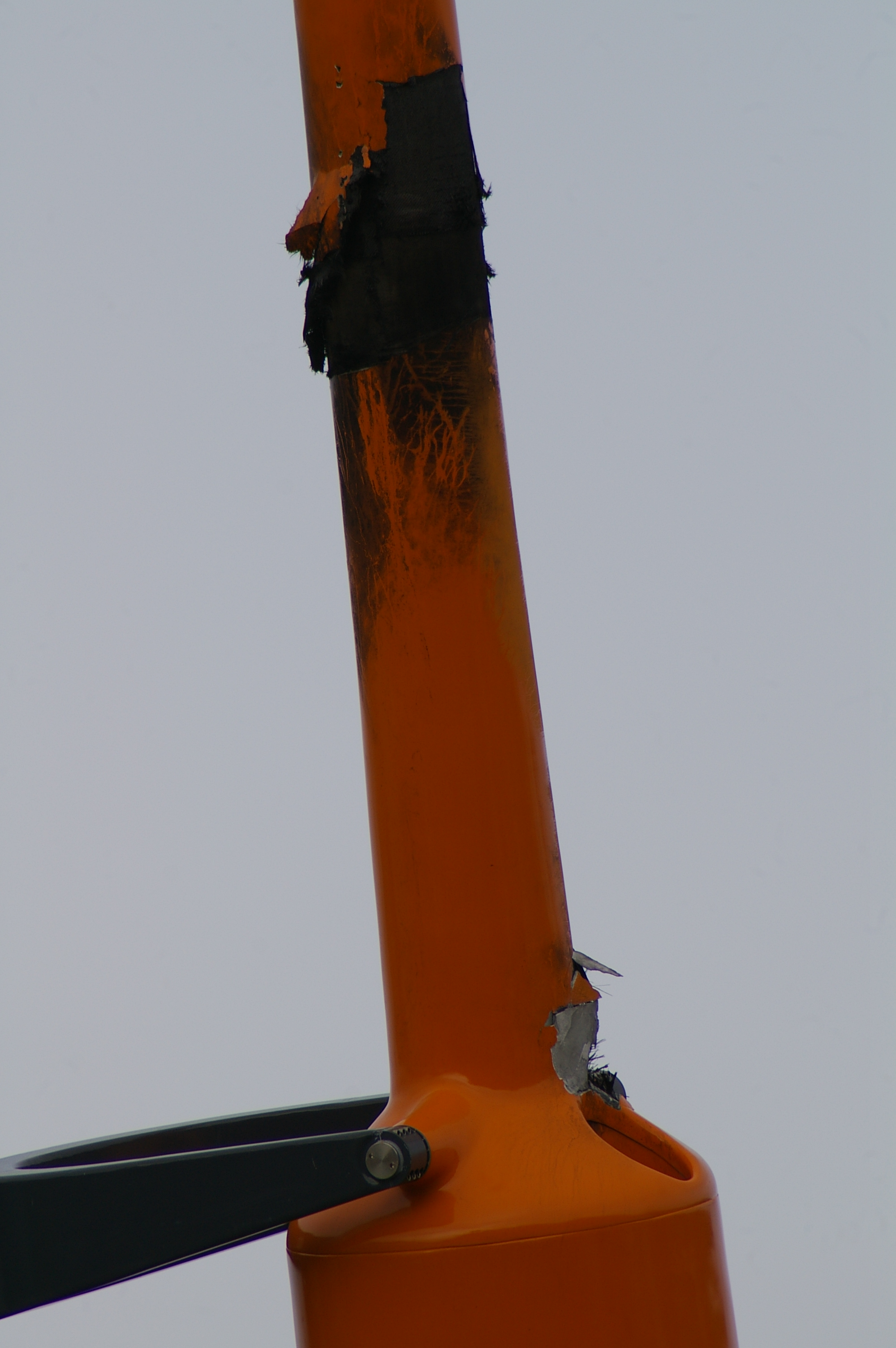
Damage near gimbal (close-up)

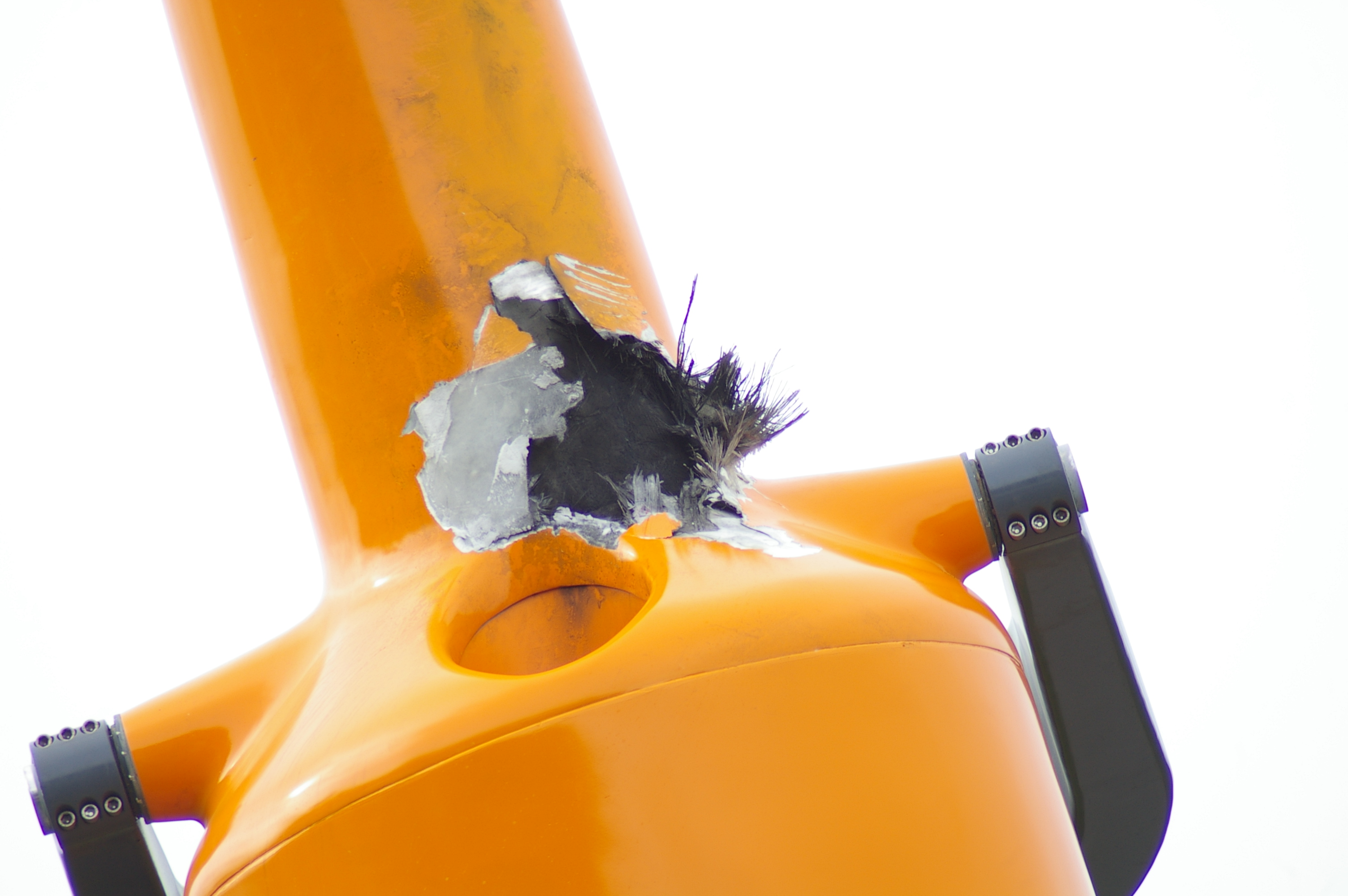
Lowest exit point (close-up)

== See also ==
- Wind Wand
- Halo (artwork)
