= Acton, Georgia =

Unincorporated community in Harris County, Georgia, United States

Coordinates: 32°39′10″N 85°00′36″W

Acton is an unincorporated community in Harris County, in the U.S. state of Georgia.

== History ==
A post office called Acton was established in 1891, and remained in operation until 1909. The name is a transfer from Acton, London.

== Location ==
Acton is located along Georgia State Route 315 approximately 2 mi (3 km) west from its intersection with Interstate 185.
