= Acton School of Business =

Entrepreneurship school in Madrid, Spain

Coordinates: 30°14′52″N 97°43′59″W

The Acton School of Business
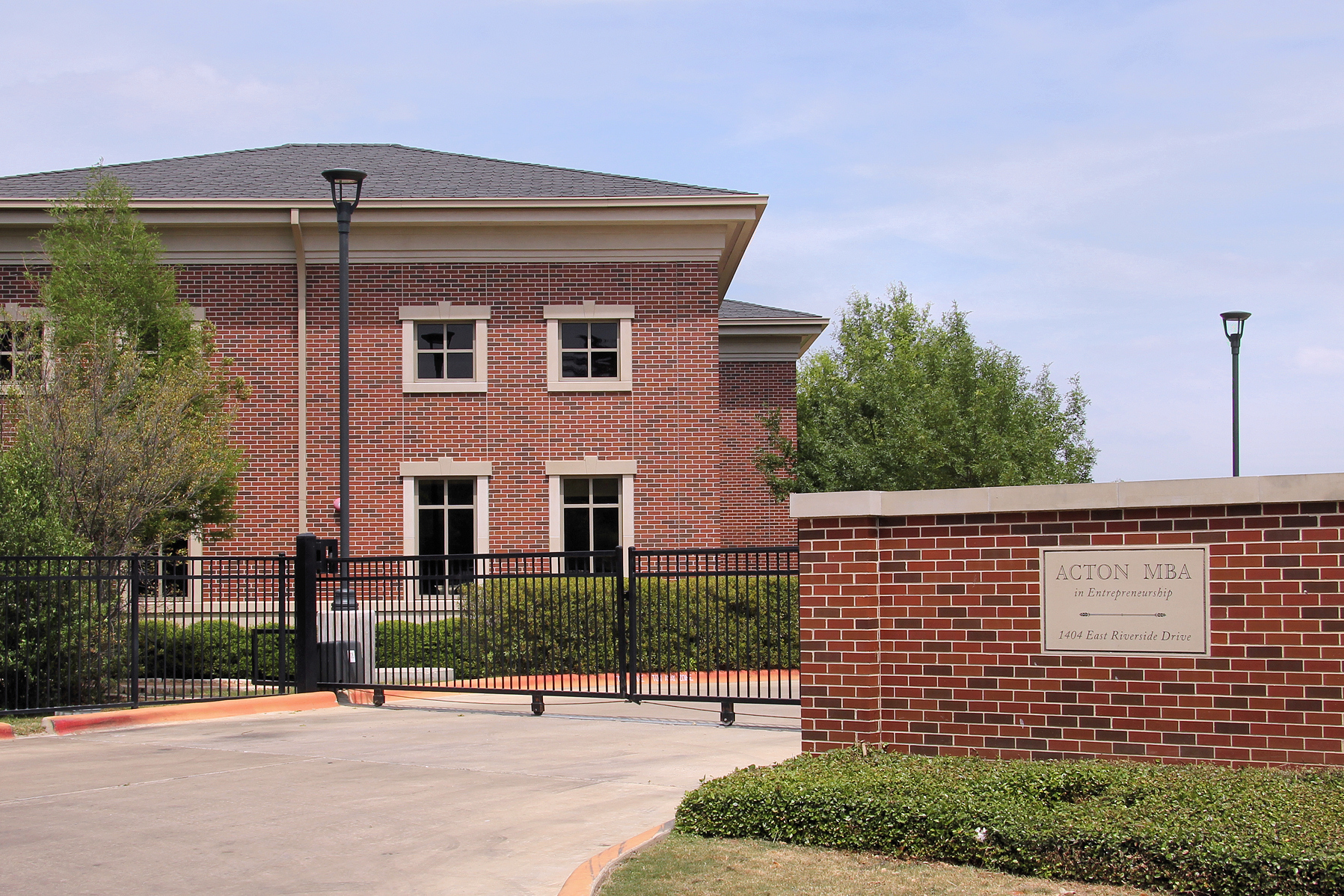
- Motto in English: Acton's mission is to prepare talented and dedicated students for extraordinary lives as principled entrepreneurs.
- Type: Private
- Established: 2002
- Director: Garrett Weber-Gale
- Location: Madrid, Spain
- Campus: Urban, 2.5 acres (10,000 m^{2})
- Website: actonmba.ufm.edu

The Acton School of Business is a school for entrepreneurship located in Madrid, Spain after losing its accreditation in Texas. Offering a full-time program, the school is based on experiential learning.

Acton originally offered an accelerated MBA program in Austin from 2002 to 2019. The school was accredited by the Southern Association of Colleges and Schools and the Association of Collegiate Business Schools and Programs through Hardin-Simmons University. Due to funding cuts at Hardin-Simmons, Acton lost its accreditation with SACS and closed its Austin campus, but reopened in Madrid, Spain, and is accredited though Universidad Francisco Marroquin. It has maintained its one year, 100 hour week course model and all classes are taught in English.

== History ==
The school derives its name from Lord Acton, a 19th-century scholar and originator of the famous quote "Power tends to corrupt, and absolute power corrupts absolutely."

In October 2018, due to a loss of funding, Hardin-Simmons University ended a number of programs. This included closure of its Acton MBA Program campus extension, which terminated Acton's accreditation after 2019. Acton has since moved from Austin to Madrid, Spain, and is accredited through Universidad Francisco Marroquin.

In December 2018, the school accepted applications for the Peterson Fellowship in association with Jordan Peterson for the class of December 2019.

== Program ==
Using case reviews, Socratic discussions, exercises and business simulations, Acton offers its MBA entrepreneurship program in under a year. Unlike traditional MBA programs, Acton offers only a core curriculum with no additional elective courses.

The average undergraduate GPA of an admitted student is 3.3, the average age is 30 (median is 29), and the average GMAT score is 637. In 2009, Founder Jeff Sandefer and his wife Laura founded Acton Academy, a system of private schools that uses the Socratic method, and similar philosophies, in the same way as the Acton MBA program. There are now over 300 Acton Academies worldwide.

== Notable alumni ==
Notable alumni from Acton include US Olympic track and field athlete Trey Hardee; and Rep. David Eastman (R) of the Alaska House of Representatives.
