= Acton, Northumberland =

Hamlet in Northumberland, England

Coordinates: 54.858°N 2.259°W

Acton
- Location within Northumberland
- OS grid reference: NY835515
- Unitary authority: Northumberland
- Ceremonial county: Northumberland
- Region: North East
- Country: England
- Sovereign state: United Kingdom
- Post town: HEXHAM
- Postcode district: NE47
- Dialling code: 01434
- Police: Northumbria
- Fire: Northumberland
- Ambulance: North East
- UK Parliament: Hexham

Acton is a small hamlet in Northumberland, north-east England, about 3 miles (5 km) south of Allendale Town. Acton is usually Anglo-Saxon Old English for "farmstead at the oak tree(s)"; here, though, it is "Acca's farmstead". Acca is an Anglo-Saxon settler's forename.

Acton is in the parliamentary constituency of Hexham.
