= Acton Vale =

Acton Vale may refer to:

- Acton Vale, Quebec, an industrial town in south-central Quebec, Canada
- Acton Vale, London, a district in London, England
