= Acton Park =

Acton Park may refer to one of several places:

- Acton Park, Wrexham, a residential area in Wales
- Acton Park, Western Australia, a small town near Busselton
- Acton Park, Tasmania, a suburb east of Hobart, Australia

Acton Park, London, a park in West London, United Kingdom
