= Methven Branch =

Coordinates: 43.634189171308385°S 171.64842188778428°E

Overview
- Status: Closed
- Owner: NZ Railways Department
- Locale: Canterbury, New Zealand
- Termini: Rakaia, New Zealand; Methven, New Zealand
- Stations: 10

Service
- Type: Heavy rail
- System: New Zealand Government Railways (NZGR)
- Operator(s): NZ Railways Department

History
- Opened: 26 February 1880
- NZR Operation: 13 December 1880
- NZR Ownership: 1885
- Closed: 31 July 1976

Technical
- Line length: 35.6 kilometres (22.1 mi)
- Number of tracks: Single
- Character: Rural
- Track gauge: 3 ft 6 in (1,067 mm)

Map

The Methven Branch was a branch line railway that was part of New Zealand's national rail network in Canterbury. It opened in 1880 and operated until 1976.

== Construction ==
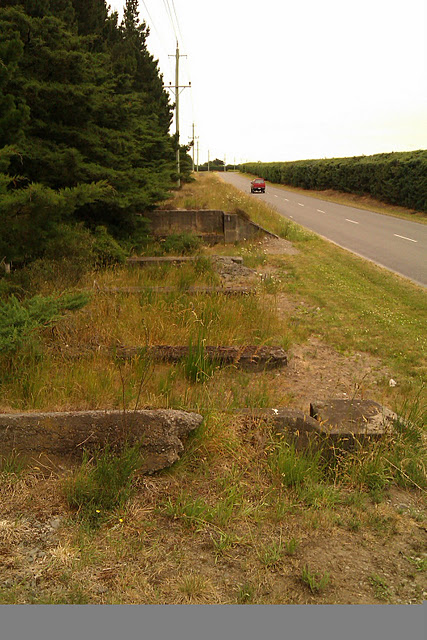
Hatfield ford bridge abutments

In 1877, the District Railways Act was passed to enable districts to construct railway lines whose construction would not be financed by the government, and in May 1878, the Rakaia and Ashburton Forks Railway Company Ltd was established to construct a line inland from the Main South Line in Rakaia to the township of Methven. The first sod was turned on 19 November 1878 in Rakaia, and as the railway did not have to pass through any difficult terrain, it was built swiftly and the full 35.6 kilometre line was opened on 26 February 1880. Originally, the line was planned to connect to Mount Somers however this did not eventuate. Settlers began petitioning the government to acquire the line in 1884, and negotiations resulted in the line being incorporated into the national network in April 1885, though formal permission from the shareholders did not come until May.

== Operation ==
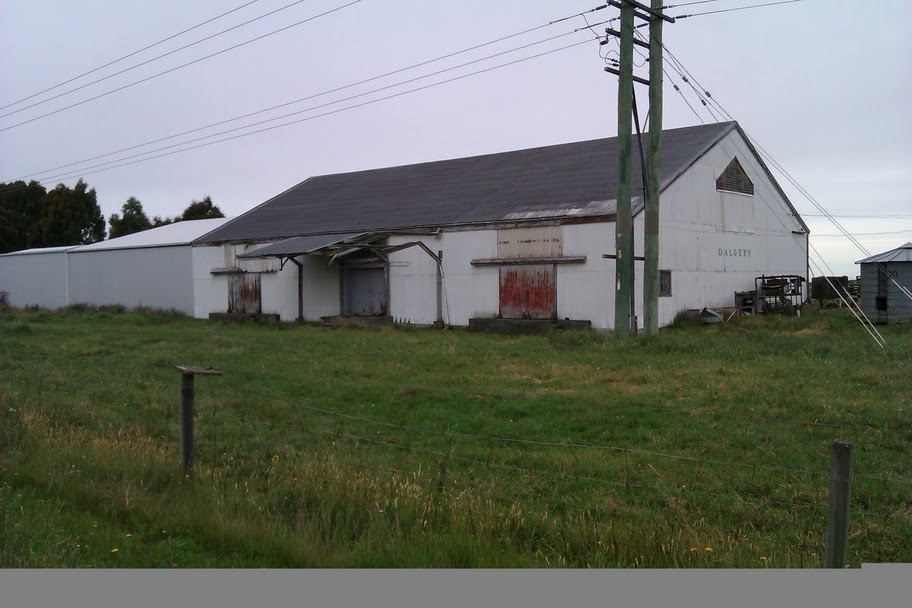
Lyndhurst Goods shed

The Rakaia and Ashburton Forks Railway Company possessed two 2-4-4T tank locomotives built by Rogers Locomotive Works and they were used to operate trains from the opening of the line. As of 13 December 1880, the government operated the Methven Branch, but the company provided the motive power and rolling stock. After the full acquisition of the line by the government in 1885, it was operated much like other rural branch lines in New Zealand, with a crew in Methven operating a daily "mixed" train of both passengers and freight to the main line junction and return. The branch's main traffic was associated with agriculture, with the main inbound freight being fertiliser and outbound being livestock, and the busiest period for goods cartage came in the 1940s when 37,000 tonnes was carried annually. Passenger numbers hit their peak in the 1920s, and subsequently declined until the passenger service was cancelled on 7 September 1958.

Methven was naturally aligned to Christchurch and its port in Lyttelton rather than a regional centre such as Ashburton, and trains began operating from Christchurch rather than Methven not long before the conclusion of World War II. A^{B} class steam locomotives were the typical form of motive power for many years on the line until it was dieselised in September 1967. Despite trains being cut to run only thrice weekly in 1969, Methven still retained a small diesel shunting locomotive in 1972. Traffic simply was not sufficient to justify the continued existence of the line and it was closed on 31 July 1976.

== Today ==
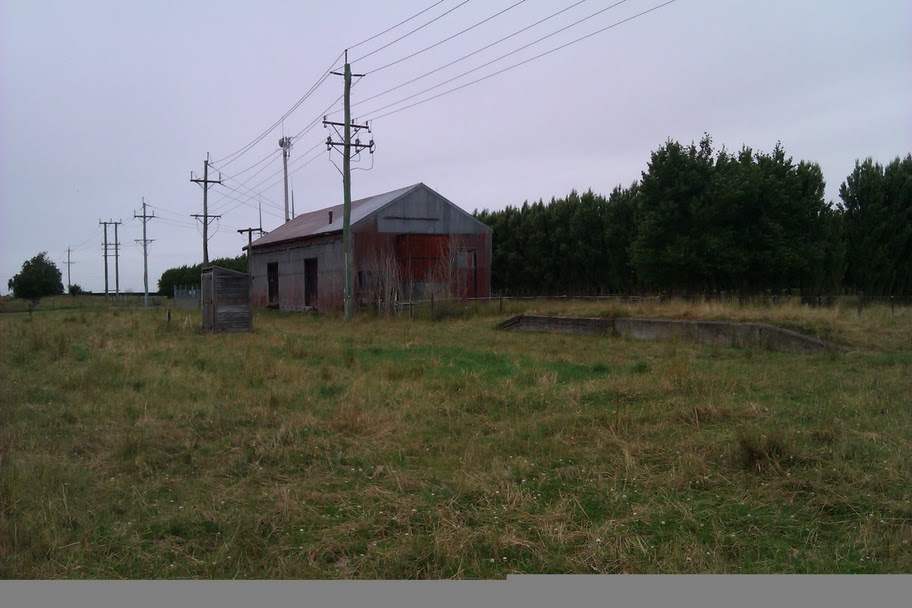
Lauriston goods shed

Remnants of closed railway lines naturally diminish and disappear over time due to both natural and human impacts, though some relics of the Methven Branch can still be found. As recently as the late 1990s the station sign in Rakaia still stated "Rakaia: change here for Methven Branch" - despite the fact passenger services on the branch had concluded roughly four decades previously. At the south end of the yard, where the branch left the main line, some rails remained in place. The line required little in the way of significant earthworks, but the formation closely followed Thompson Track and then Line Road and can still be traced; some rails remain embedded in the road surface where Jamieson's Road meets Thompson Track. Some bridge abutments can also be sighted, and goods sheds remain in Lauriston and Lyndhurst. In the latter locale, loading platforms built to serve sidings from the railway can still be seen at two businesses. Only one railway building now remains in Methven, though the embankment the railway used as it approached the town is still apparent. The 'Railway Reserve' in the centre of Methven is a small park adjacent to the Blue Pub and Medical Centre and was the site of the railway station.
