= Acton Green, Herefordshire =

Village in Herefordshire, England

Coordinates: 52.147°N 2.443°W

Acton Green
- Village
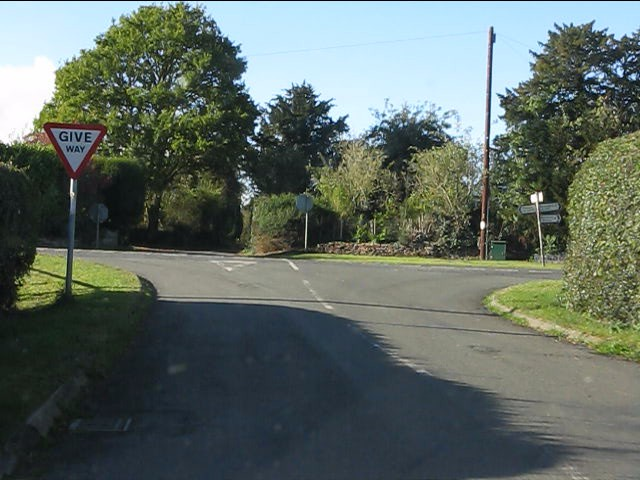
- Crossroads at Acton Green
- Country: England
- Sovereign state: United Kingdom

Acton Green is a hamlet in the north east of the English county of Herefordshire (historically Worcestershire) between Bromyard and Great Malvern.
