= Acton High School (Massachusetts) =

- U.S. National Register of Historic Places
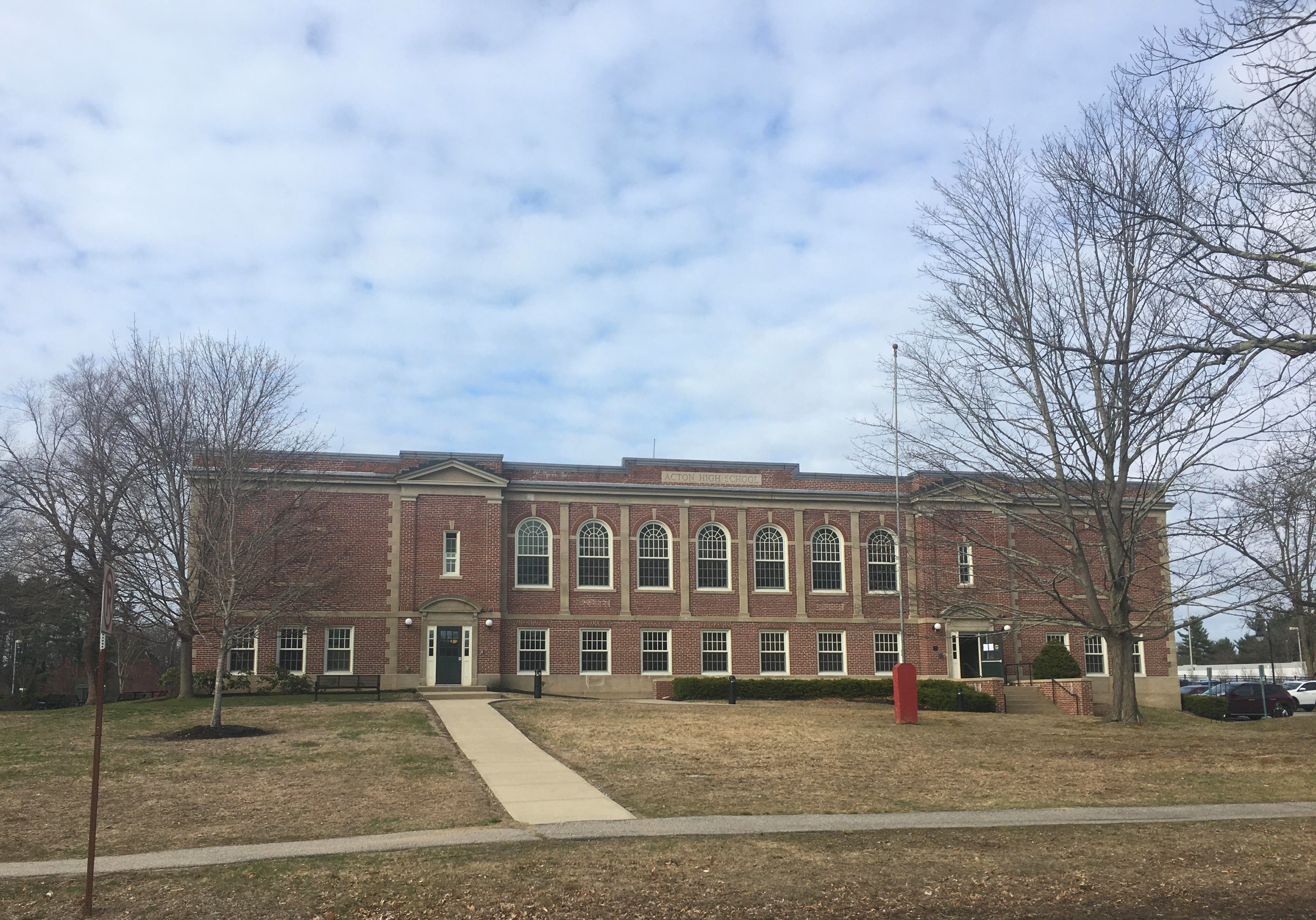

- Location within Massachusetts Location within the United States
- Location: 3 Charter Road; Acton, Massachusetts
- Coordinates: 42°28′32″N 71°27′20″W
- Area: 3.1 acres (1.3 ha)
- Built: 1925
- Architect: John H. Bickford
- NRHP reference No.: 11000854

The old Acton High School, also known as the McCarthy-Towne Elementary School, is a historic school building at 3 Charter Road in Acton, Massachusetts. Built in 1925, this Renaissance Revival building served as the town's high school for 30 years, and then as an elementary school for 45. It was the town's first purpose-built high school. The building was listed on the National Register of Historic Places in 2011.

== Description and history ==
The former Acton High School is set at the northeast corner of Charter Road and Massachusetts Avenue (Massachusetts Route 111) near the geographic center of the town, and adjacent to a number of its other school buildings. It is a two-story brick building in a U shape, with Renaissance Revival styling. Its south-facing front facade has a stepped parapet, obscuring a flat roof. Its central block is fifteen bays wide, with two projecting entry pavilions. The entrances are framed by simple molding and topped by segmented-arch pediments, with narrow windows in the pavilion above. Bands of limestone trim separate the first and second stories, and the second story and the cornice. The building corners are quoined with limestone blocks.

The building was designed by Boston architect/engineer John H. Bickford, and built in 1925. It was the town's first purpose-built high school building, its previous high school classes (begun in 1883) having been rotated through other school buildings in the system. The building served in that capacity for thirty years. It then served another 45 years as an elementary school, during which time a substantial addition was made to bring the building to its present configuration. The school was finally closing in 2000. It has been converted to residences.

== See also ==
- National Register of Historic Places listings in Middlesex County, Massachusetts
