= Rakaia =

Town in Canterbury, New Zealand

- town
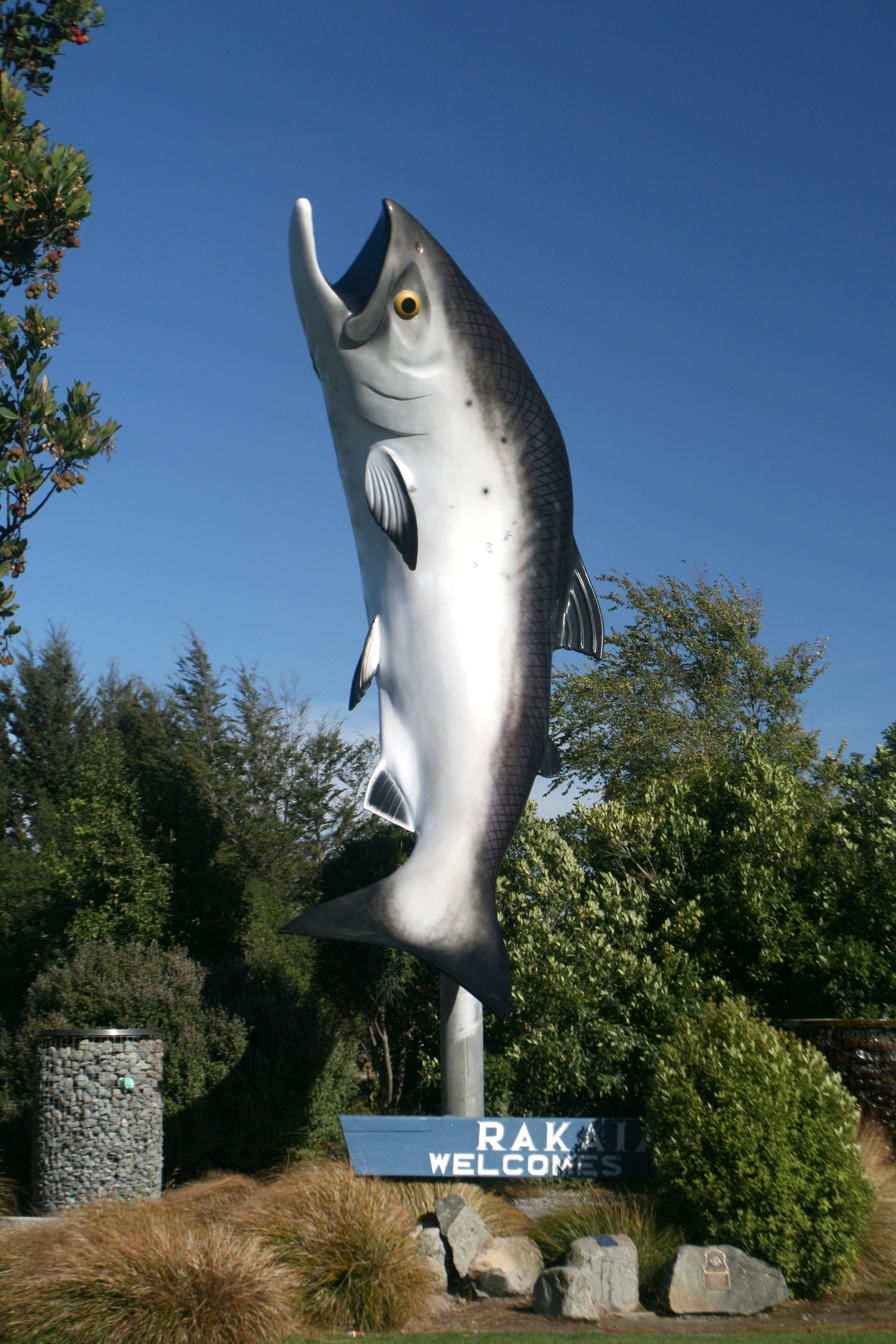
- The Big Salmon of Rakaia
- Interactive map of Rakaia
- Coordinates: 43°45′S 172°01′E
- Country: New Zealand
- Region: Canterbury
- Territorial authority: Ashburton District
- Ward: Eastern
- Electorates: Rangitata; Te Tai Tonga (Māori)

Government
  - Territorial authority: Ashburton District Council
  - Regional council: Environment Canterbury
  - Mayor of Ashburton: Liz McMillan
  - Rangitata MP: James Meager
  - Te Tai Tonga MP: Tākuta Ferris

Area
  - Total: 11.30 km^{2} (4.36 sq mi)
- Elevation: 108 m (354 ft)

Population (June 2025)
  - Total: 1,680
  - Density: 149/km^{2} (385/sq mi)

Rakaia is a town sited on the southern banks of the Rakaia River on the Canterbury Plains in New Zealand's South Island, approximately 57 km south of Christchurch on State Highway 1 and the Main South Line. Immediately north of the township are New Zealand's longest road bridge and longest rail bridge, both of which cross the wide shingle beds of the braided river at this point. Both bridges are approximately 1,750 metres (5,740 ft) in length.

Rakaia was also the junction of the Methven Branch, a branch line railway to Methven that operated from 1880 until its closure in 1976. An accident at the railway station in 1899 killed four people.

Rakaia's most obvious feature is a large fibreglass salmon. The river from which the town takes its name is known for its salmon fishing and jetboating. In 2025 the sculpture was temporarily moved to the workshop of its creator Phil Price for restoration.

The town and river were previously known as Cholmondeley, but the Māori name would eventually prevail over the English one.

The rural community of Acton is located south of the Rakaia township.

== Demographics ==
Rakaia is described by Statistics New Zealand as a small urban area and covers 11.30 km^{2} (4.36 sq mi). It had an estimated population of 1,680 as of June 2025, with a population density of 148.7 people per km^{2}.

Historical population
Year	Pop.	±% p.a.
2006	1,071	—
2013	1,272	+2.49%
2018	1,440	+2.51%
2023	1,578	+1.85%

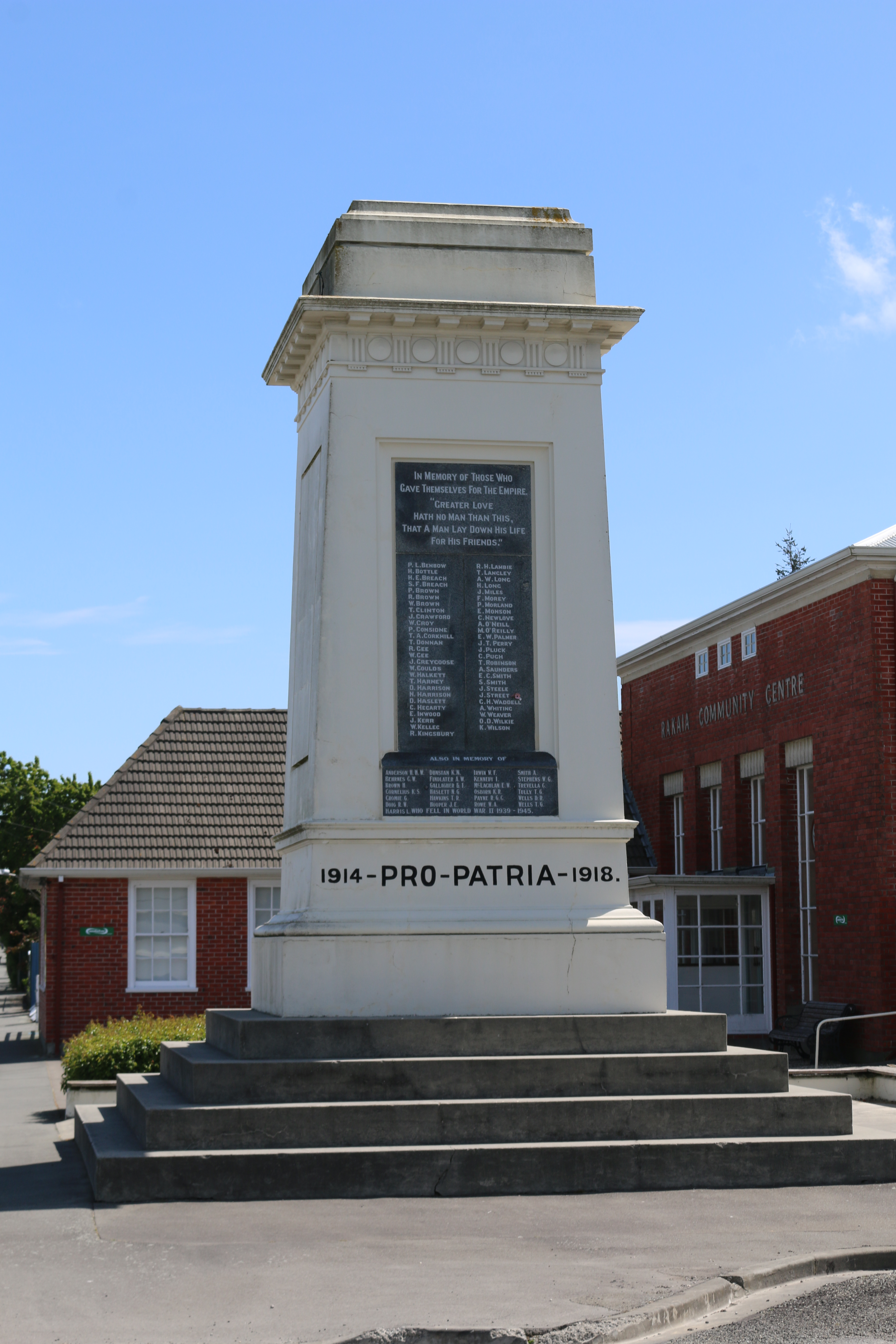
War Memorial Rakaia

Rākaia had a population of 1,578 in the 2023 New Zealand census, an increase of 138 people (9.6%) since the 2018 census, and an increase of 306 people (24.1%) since the 2013 census. There were 798 males and 774 females in 618 dwellings. 3.0% of people identified as LGBTIQ+. The median age was 40.1 years (compared with 38.1 years nationally). There were 294 people (18.6%) aged under 15 years, 255 (16.2%) aged 15 to 29, 765 (48.5%) aged 30 to 64, and 264 (16.7%) aged 65 or older.

People could identify as more than one ethnicity. The results were 85.6% European (Pākehā); 12.0% Māori; 6.5% Pasifika; 4.6% Asian; 0.4% Middle Eastern, Latin American and African New Zealanders (MELAA); and 3.6% other, which includes people giving their ethnicity as "New Zealander". English was spoken by 97.7%, Māori by 2.7%, and other languages by 6.5%. No language could be spoken by 1.7% (e.g. too young to talk). New Zealand Sign Language was known by 0.4%. The percentage of people born overseas was 14.8, compared with 28.8% nationally.

Religious affiliations were 27.9% Christian, 0.4% Hindu, 0.4% Islam, 0.2% Māori religious beliefs, 0.4% New Age, and 1.1% other religions. People who answered that they had no religion were 60.6%, and 8.7% of people did not answer the census question.

Of those at least 15 years old, 150 (11.7%) people had a bachelor's or higher degree, 756 (58.9%) had a post-high school certificate or diploma, and 372 (29.0%) people exclusively held high school qualifications. The median income was $42,600, compared with $41,500 nationally. 72 people (5.6%) earned over $100,000 compared to 12.1% nationally. The employment status of those at least 15 was 687 (53.5%) full-time, 168 (13.1%) part-time, and 27 (2.1%) unemployed.

== Education ==
Rakaia School is a state full primary school (years 1 to 8) with a roll of 195 (as of July 2026). It opened in 1872 and has since merged with Awaroa (1929–1948), Overdale (1896–1935), and Rakaia Convent / St Ita's (1912–1980s) schools.

Dorie School is a rural state full primary school south of Rakaia, near the Ashburton River mouth. It had a roll of 62 (as of July 2026). It opened in 1888.

== Notable buildings ==
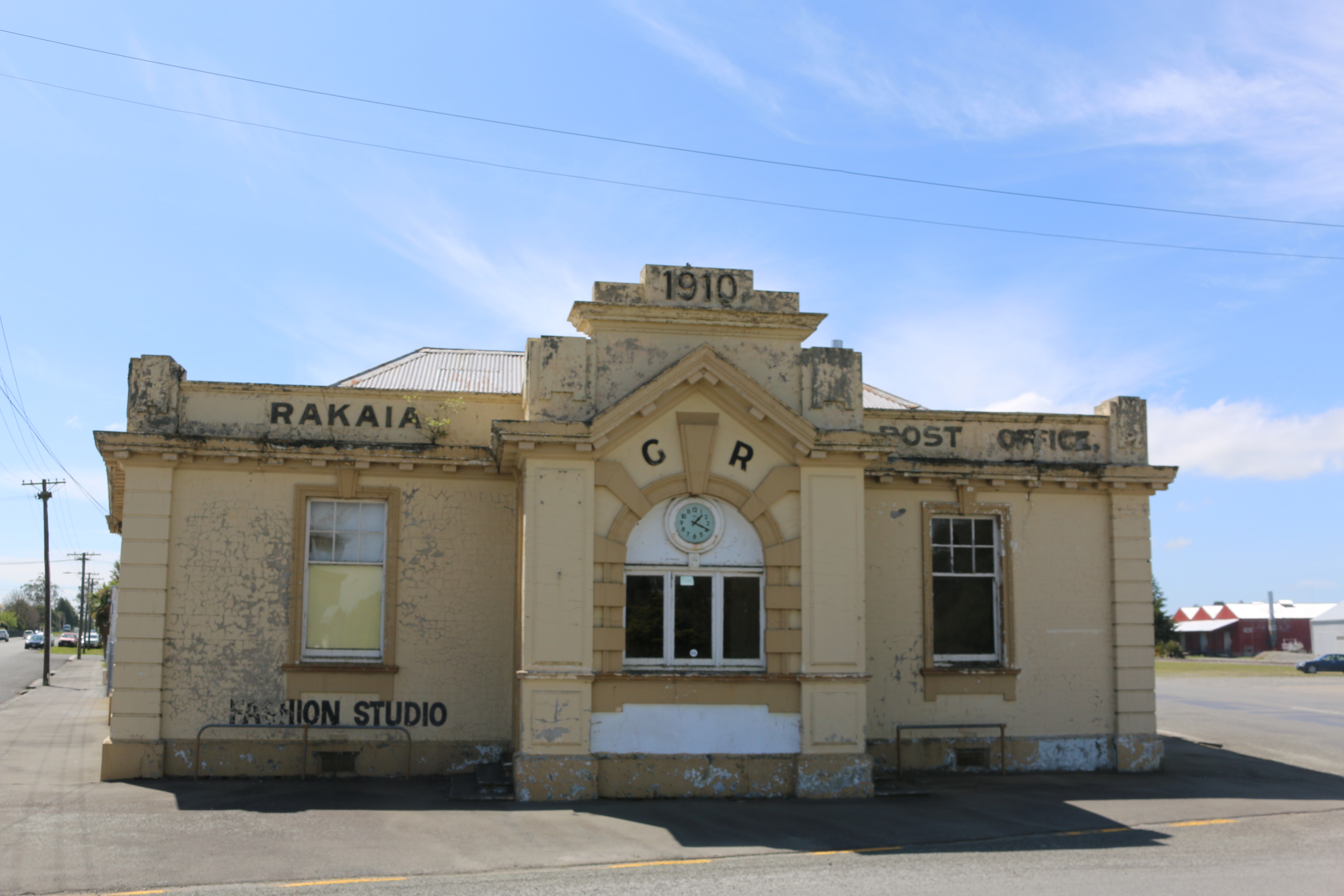
Rakaia Post Office Building built 1910

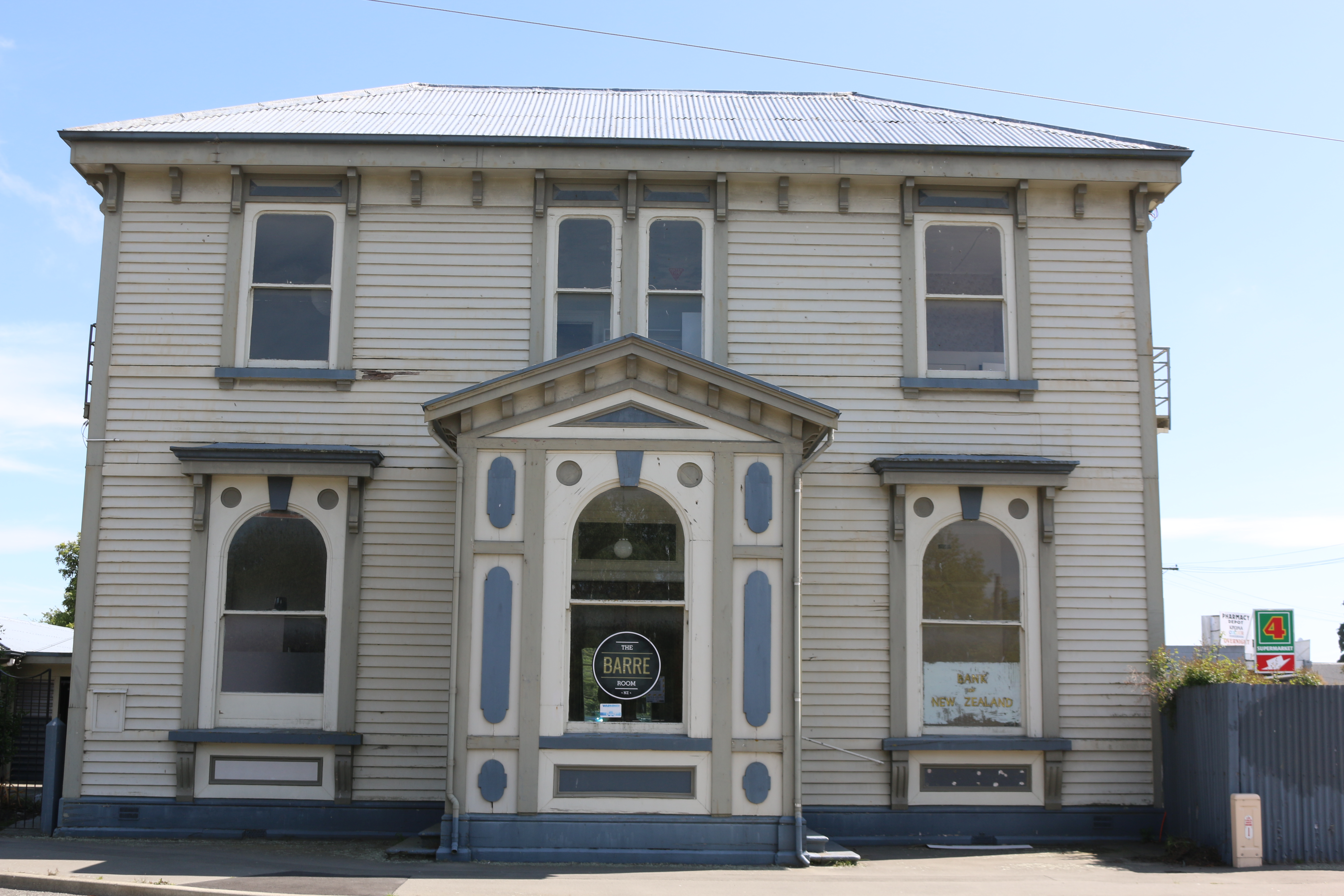
Bank of New Zealand Building

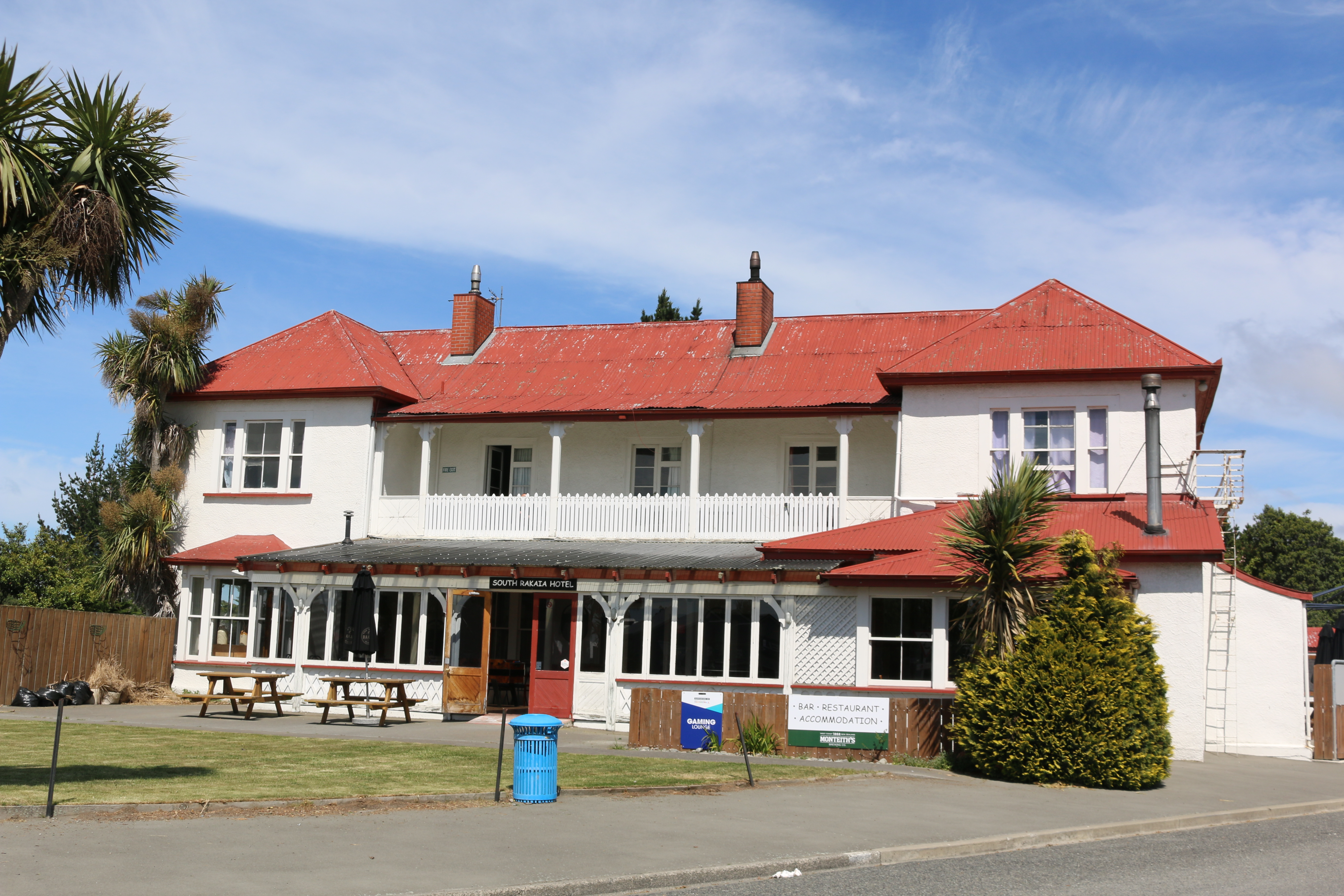
South Rakaia Hotel

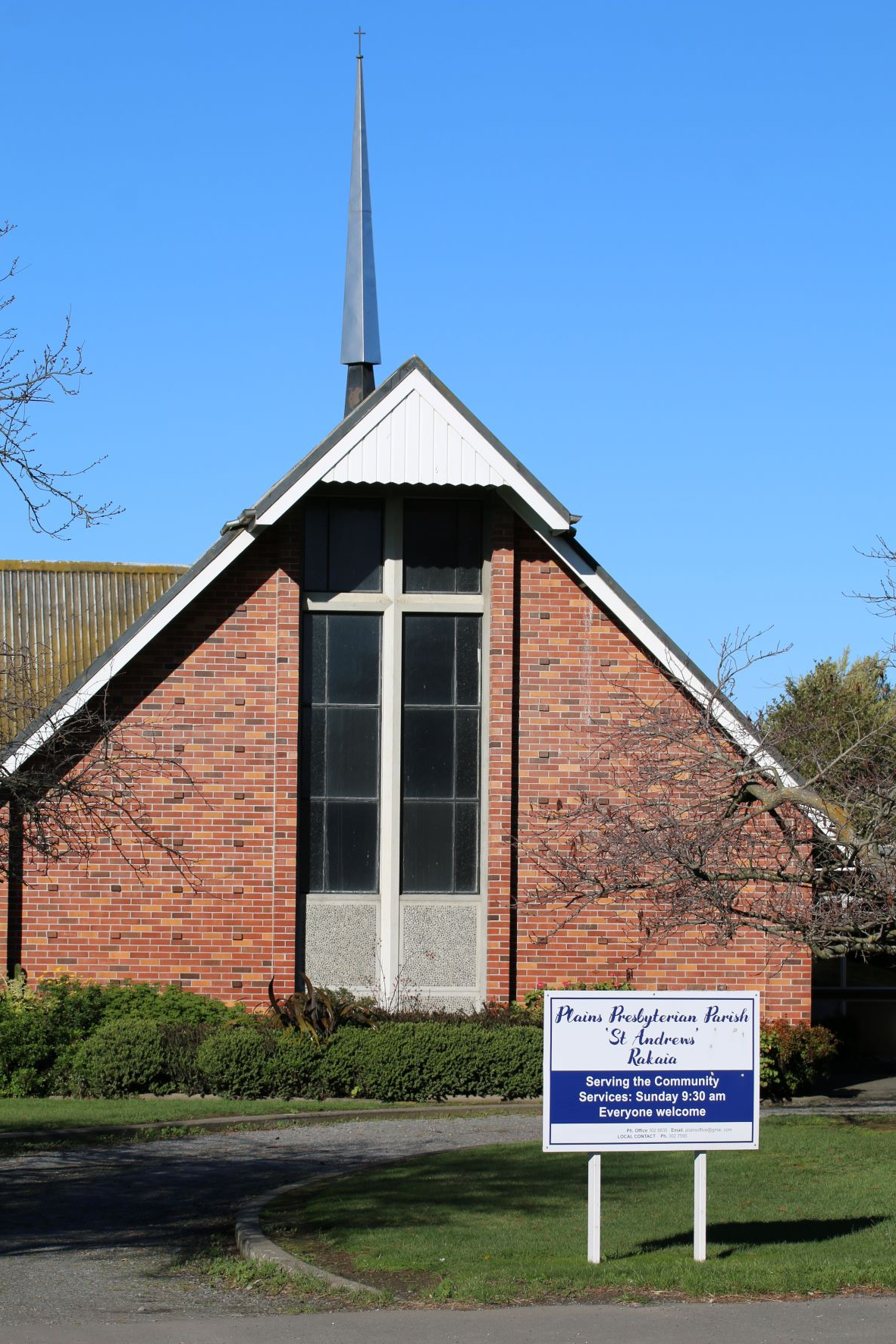
St Andrews Presbyterian Church, Rakaia (July 2021)

=== Saint Mark's Anglican Church ===
Saint Marks was built in 1877. It was designed by architect Benjamin Mountfort in a Gothic style. It is considered a typical example of the wooden churches he designed for small parishes. The church was listed as a category two historic place in 1992.

=== Rakaia Post Office ===
The Rakaia Post Office was built in 1910.

=== South Rakaia Hotel ===
The South Rakaia Hotel was built about 1872.
