= Ashburton Guardian =

New Zealand newspaper

- Type: Tri-weekly Newspaper
- Format: Compact
- Owner: Ashburton Guardian Company Ltd
- Founded: 1879
- Headquarters: Ashburton, New Zealand
- Circulation: 5,555
- Website: www.guardianonline.co.nz

The Ashburton Guardian is a tri-weekly newspaper published in Ashburton, New Zealand according to the Audit Bureau of Circulation in New Zealand it has a readership of approximately 11,000 and a circulation of 5,554. It was founded in 1879 and has since 1900 been owned by the Bell family.

== History ==
According to the Newspaper Publishers Association of New Zealand the Ashburton Guardian was first published in September 1879. Almost 11,000 editions of the Ashburton Guardian have been digitised and are available through Papers Past, a service offered by the National Library; those editions cover the period from 1 January 1887 to 31 December 1921.

In 2000, the Ashburton Guardian was the first newspaper in New Zealand to go to a compact format; this was done for the Saturday edition only. In July 2013, the weekday editions also went from broadsheet to compact.

The newspaper was a member of the now defunct New Zealand Press Association.

=== Ownership ===
Charles Dixon and Horace Weeks started the newspaper to oppose Joseph Ivess, who had started the Evening News earlier in 1879 in support of his mayoralty campaign. In the following year, they sold the newspaper to Edward George Wright and Hugo Friedlander, the latter of whom had beaten Ivess in the mayoral election. In 1885, they sold the Guardian to William Steward, who himself sold to Robert Bell in 1900. As at 2015, the Ashburton Guardian is still owned by the Bell family, and that makes it one of the few independently-owned daily newspapers in New Zealand.
