= Estate village =

Village within a private estate

An estate village is a village wholly within and part of a private estate. Usually several hundred years old, they are often well preserved by the family that owns the estate. They often have small commercial operations such as pubs, craft shops, and village stores, as well as rented residential housing. The individual properties are maintained and managed by the estate manager and rented individually to residential and commercial tenants.

== List of estate villages ==
=== England ===
Name	County	Estate	Image	Former?	Notes and references
Abbotsbury	Dorset				
Adlestrop	Gloucestershire	Adlestrop Park			
Albury	Surrey	Albury Park			
Alport	Derbyshire	Haddon Hall			
Bashall Eaves	Lancashire	Bashall Hall			
Batsford	Gloucestershire	Batsford Park			
Beeley	Derbyshire	Chatsworth House			
Bugthorpe	East Riding of Yorkshire	Garrowby Hall			
Cardington	Bedfordshire	Southill Park			
Charlton Abbots	Gloucestershire				
Chettle	Dorset	Chettle House			
Chilton	Buckinghamshire	Chilton House			
Clovelly	Devon	Clovelly Court			
Cowling	North Yorkshire	Thornton Watlass Hall			
Downham	Lancashire	Downham Hall			
East Hauxwell	North Yorkshire	Hauxwell Hall			
East Quantoxhead	Somerset	Court House, East Quantoxhead			
Edensor	Derbyshire	Chatsworth House			
Edmondsham	Dorset	Edmondsham House			
Elveden	Suffolk	Elveden Hall			
Englefield	Berkshire	Englefield House			
Eridge	East Sussex	Eridge Estate			
Firle	East Sussex	Firle Place			
Glynde	East Sussex	Glynde Place			
Great Barrington	Gloucestershire	Barrington Park			
Great Limber	Lincolnshire	Brocklesby Hall			
Great Tew	Oxfordshire				
Ham	Gloucestershire	Berkeley Castle			
Heydon	Norfolk	Heydon Hall			
Holkham	Norfolk	Holkham Hall			
Lacock	Wiltshire	Lacock Abbey			
Linkenholt	Hampshire				
Little Barford	Bedfordshire				
Little Walsingham	Norfolk	The Abbey, Little Walsingham			
Lythe	North Yorkshire	Mulgrave Castle			
Matfen	Northumberland	Matfen Hall			
Milton Abbas	Dorset	Milton Abbey			
Molland	Devon				
Notgrove	Gloucestershire	Notgrove Manor			
Old Warden	Bedfordshire	Shuttleworth House			
Peper Harow	Surrey	Peper Harow House			
Pilsley	Derbyshire	Chatsworth House			
Ripley	North Yorkshire	Ripley Castle			
Rockingham	Northamptonshire	Rockingham Castle		No	
Rowsley	Derbyshire	Haddon Hall			
Salperton	Gloucestershire	Salperton Park			National Trust-owned
Selworthy	Somerset	Holnicote Estate			National Trust-owned
Shenton	Leicestershire	Shenton Hall			Shenton Hall sold
Sherborne	Gloucestershire	Sherborne House			
Sotterley	Suffolk	Sotterley Hall			
Southill	Bedfordshire	Southill Park			
Stanway	Gloucestershire	Stanway House			
Tissington	Derbyshire	Tissington Hall			
Trevalga	Cornwall				
Well	Lincolnshire	Well Vale Hall			
West Heslerton	North Yorkshire				
Yanworth	Gloucestershire	Stowell Park			
Yattendon	Berkshire				
Yokefleet	East Riding of Yorkshire	Yokefleet Hall		Y	

=== Scotland ===
Name	County	Estate	Image	Former?	Notes and references
Abbey St Bathans	Berwickshire	Abbey St Bathans House			
Berriedale	Highland				

=== Ireland ===
- Abbeyleix, County Laois
- Adare, County Limerick
- Ballyhaise, County Cavan
- Belleek, County Fermanagh
- Glenarm, County Antrim
- Greyabbey, the Ards, County Down
- Hillsborough, County Down
- Strangford, County Down
- Westport, County Mayo

=== New Zealand ===
Name	County	Estate	Image	Former?	Notes and references
Barrhill	Canterbury, South Island	Cathcart Wason			
