= Ashburton (New Zealand electorate) =

Ashburton was a New Zealand electorate, first created in 1881 and centred on the South Island town of Ashburton.

== Population centres ==
The previous electoral redistribution was undertaken in 1875 for the 1875–1876 election. In the six years since, New Zealand's European population had increased by 65%. In the 1881 electoral redistribution, the House of Representatives increased the number of European representatives to 91 (up from 84 since the 1875–76 election). The number of Māori electorates was held at four. The House further decided that electorates should not have more than one representative, which led to 35 new electorates being formed, including Ashburton, and two electorates that had previously been abolished to be recreated. This necessitated a major disruption to existing boundaries.

The town of Ashburton itself was on the very edge of the electorate, which stretched northwest up the Ashburton River / Hakatere. It included Methven, Mount Somers, and Lake Heron. However, the boundaries of Ashburton electorate were highly variable, with the town of Ashburton being the only constant. In the 1887 election, most of the electorate's southern half was taken away to join the new Rangitata seat, but in the 1890 election, most of this territory was regained, with a similar amount of territory in the north, around Methven, being taken instead. Methven was incorporated into the Ellesmere seat. Ashburton also gained territory on the coast at this point. In the 1893 election, the situation reverted to its previous state, with the south being lost and Methven regained, but this itself was reversed in the 1896 election. The electorate then remained relatively stable until the 1911 election, when completely new boundaries were established — the electorate was now centred on Geraldine, with Ashburton itself in a spur at the northeastern extremity. The 1919 election saw a complete revocation of this, with the electorate going back to focus on its original southern territories, and gaining Lake Coleridge. It lost Lake Coleridge again in the 1922 election. In the 1928 election, the seat was abolished, with its northern half merging with Ellesmere to form Mid-Canterbury and its southern half being absorbed into Temuka.

The 1941 New Zealand census had been postponed due to World War II, so the 1946 electoral redistribution had to take ten years of population growth and movements into account. The North Island gained a further two electorates from the South Island due to faster population growth. The abolition of the country quota through the Electoral Amendment Act, 1945 reduced the number and increased the size of rural electorates. None of the existing electorates remained unchanged, 27 electorates were abolished, 19 electorates were created for the first time, and eight former electorates were re-established, including Ashburton. The recreated Ashburton electorate took territory from both Mid-Canterbury and Temuka. In the 1957 election, it gained Geraldine from Waimate, but lost Methven to Selwyn. In the 1963 election, it gained a large amount of inland territory, including Lake Tekapo and Twizel. In 1969 election, the electorate was abolished — most of its territory was merged with Waitaki to form South Canterbury, while Ashburton itself was incorporated into Selwyn.

Through an amendment in the Electoral Act in 1965, the number of electorates in the South Island was fixed at 25, an increase of one since the 1962 electoral redistribution. It was accepted that through the more rapid population growth in the North Island, the number of its electorates would continue to increase, and to keep proportionality, three new electorates were allowed for in the 1967 electoral redistribution for the next election. In the North Island, five electorates were newly created and one electorate was reconstituted while three electorates were abolished. In the South Island, three electorates were newly created and one electorate was reconstituted while three electorates were abolished (including Ashburton). The overall effect of the required changes was highly disruptive to existing electorates, with all but three electorates having their boundaries altered. These changes came into effect with the 1969 election.

A third electorate named Ashburton was created for the 1978 election. It was formed from the southern portion of Rakaia (the successor to Selwyn) and the northern portion of South Canterbury, and included Methven, Geraldine, and Fairlie. In the 1984 election, Fairlie was absorbed into Timaru, and in the 1987 election, the electorate absorbed the town of Rakaia. In the 1990 election, the seat was abolished again, with the seat of Rakaia being established to replace it.

== History ==
Although the electorate has always included the town of Ashburton, and often a number of smaller towns, the bulk of its territory has always been rural. As such, the electorate has tended to be rather conservative in its political outlook. The Liberal Party held the seat for a time during its period of dominance, but the seat later became the stronghold of William Nosworthy, a senior figure in the conservative Reform Party.

Edward George Wright was the first representative of Ashburton; he had since 1879 represented the Coleridge electorate. In the 1881 election, Wright was returned unopposed.

By the time of the second Ashburton electorate, rural New Zealand was largely united behind the National Party, which held Ashburton for the whole of its second and third incarnations. Its last MP was Jenny Shipley, who went on to become Prime Minister.

=== Members of Parliament ===
Key

Independent Conservative Liberal Reform National

Elections	Winner
1881 election	Edward George Wright
1884 election	William Walker
1887 election	William Walker
1890 election	Edward George Wright (2nd time)
1893 election	John McLachlan
1896 election	Edward George Wright (3rd time)
1899 election	John McLachlan (2nd time)
1902 election	John McLachlan (2nd time)
1905 election	John McLachlan (2nd time)
1908 election	William Nosworthy
1911 election	William Nosworthy
1914 election	William Nosworthy
1919 election	William Nosworthy
1922 election	William Nosworthy
1925 election	William Nosworthy
(Electorate abolished 1928–1946, see Mid-Canterbury)
1946 election	Geoff Gerard
1949 election	Geoff Gerard
1951 election	Geoff Gerard
1954 election	Geoff Gerard
1957 election	Geoff Gerard
1960 election	Geoff Gerard
1963 election	Geoff Gerard
1966 election	Rob Talbot
1969 election	Colin McLachlan
(Electorate abolished 1972–1978, see Rakaia)
1978 election	Rob Talbot (2nd time)
1981 election	Rob Talbot (2nd time)
1984 election	Rob Talbot (2nd time)
1987 election	Jenny Shipley
1990 election	Jenny Shipley
(Electorate abolished in 1993; see Rakaia)

== Election results ==
=== 1925 election ===
1925 general election: Ashburton
Party	Candidate	Votes	%	±%
Reform	William Nosworthy	3,982	53.30	+1.20
Labour	John Nicholson Harle	1,864	24.96	+8.29
Independent Liberal	Robert Galbraith	1,134	15.18	
Liberal	Henry Manwell Jones	417	5.58	−25.65
Majority		2,117	28.43	+7.56
Turnout		7,466	92.08	+2.41
Registered electors		8,108		

=== 1922 election ===
1922 general election: Ashburton
Party	Candidate	Votes	%	±%
Reform	William Nosworthy	3,700	52.10	−6.61
Liberal	Henry Manwell Jones	2,218	31.23	+27.03
Labour	Frederick Cooke	1,184	16.67	
Majority		1,482	20.87	−0.74
Turnout		7,102	89.67	+4.06
Registered electors		7,920		

=== 1919 election ===
1919 general election: Ashburton
Party	Candidate	Votes	%	±%
Reform	William Nosworthy	4,056	58.71	+8.03
Liberal	William Dickie	2,563	37.10	
Independent Liberal	Henry Manwell Jones	290	4.20	
Majority		1,493	21.61	+19.27
Informal votes		42	0.60	−0.39
Turnout		6,951	85.61	−2.84
Registered electors		8,119		

=== 1914 election ===
1914 general election: Ashburton
Party	Candidate	Votes	%	±%
Reform	William Nosworthy	3,186	50.68	+2.70
Liberal	William Maslin	3,039	48.34	+29.02
Majority		147	2.34	−19.94
Informal votes		62	0.99	−.07
Turnout		6,278	88.45	+3.29
Registered electors		7,098		

=== 1911 election ===
1911 general election: Ashburton, first ballot
Party	Candidate	Votes	%	±%
Reform	William Nosworthy	2,864	47.98	+24.18
Liberal	John Kennedy	1,534	25.70	−16.08
Reform	William Maslin	1,153	19.32	14.44
Independent	John McLachlan	418	7.00	−41.48
Majority		1,330	22.28	+5.11
Informal votes		64	1.06	+0.92
Turnout		6,033	85.16	+3.98
Registered electors		7,084		

1911 general election: Ashburton, second ballot
Party	Candidate	Votes	%	±%
Reform	William Nosworthy	3,232	58.22	−34.42
Liberal	John Kennedy	2,319	41.78	
Majority		913	16.45	−0.72
Informal votes		8	0.14	−0.72
Turnout		5,559	78.47	−2.72
Registered electors		7,084		

=== 1908 election ===
1908 general election: Ashburton, first ballot
Party	Candidate	Votes	%	±%
Liberal	Frederick Flatman	2,293	40.97	−1.96
Conservative	William Nosworthy	1,332	23.80	−33.27
Conservative	David Jones	1,302	23.26	
Ind. Labour League	John Doran Gobbe	397	7.09	
Conservative	William Maslin	273	4.88	−12.43
Majority		961	17.17	+12.47
Turnout		5,597	81.19	−3.40
Registered electors		6,894		

1908 general election: Ashburton, second ballot
Party	Candidate	Votes	%	±%
Conservative	William Nosworthy	3,014	57.07	
Liberal	Frederick Flatman	2,267	42.93	
Majority		747	14.15	+9.45
Turnout		5,281	76.60	−7.98
Registered electors		6,894		

=== 1905 election ===
1905 general election: Ashburton
Party	Candidate	Votes	%	±%
Liberal	John McLachlan	2,518	48.48	+2.81
Conservative	John Studholme	2,274	43.78	+7.51
Liberal	Joseph Sealy	402	7.74	
Majority		244	4.70	−4.71
Informal votes		45	0.86	
Turnout		5,239	84.58	+5.14
Registered electors		6,194		

=== 1902 election ===
1902 general election: Ashburton
Party	Candidate	Votes	%	±%
Liberal	John McLachlan	2,132	45.67	−2.59
Conservative	John Studholme	1,693	36.27	
Liberal	William Brock	783	16.77	
Liberal	Albert Ager	60	1.29	
Majority		439	9.40	−9.69
Turnout		4,668	79.44	−0.89
Registered electors		5,876		

=== 1899 election ===
1899 general election: Ashburton
Party	Candidate	Votes	%	±%
Liberal	John McLachlan	2,027	48.26	+18.37
Conservative	Charles John Harper	1,225	29.17	
Independent	William Maslin	727	17.31	
Liberal	John McKeague	221	5.26	
Majority		802	19.10	+12.38
Turnout		4,200	80.34	+6.05
Registered electors		5,228		

=== 1896 election ===
1896 general election: Ashburton
Party	Candidate	Votes	%	±%
Conservative	Edward George Wright	1,320	36.61	+1.17
Liberal	John McLachlan	1,078	29.89	−2.33
Independent	Rev. James Wright Sawle	981	27.20	−7.26
Independent	Joseph Ivess	227	6.30	
Majority		242	6.71	+5.96
Turnout		3,606	74.29	+8.23
Registered electors		4,854		

=== 1893 election ===
1893 general election: Ashburton
Party	Candidate	Votes	%	±%
Liberal	John McLachlan	1,117	32.23	
Conservative	Cathcart Wason	1,091	31.48	−16.25
Liberal	George Chester Waby	714	20.60	
Conservative	Charles Purnell	544	15.70	−11.19
Majority		26	0.75	−0.23
Turnout		3,466	66.06	+13.69
Registered electors		5,247		

=== 1890 election ===
1890 general election: Ashburton
Party	Candidate	Votes	%	±%
Conservative	Edward George Wright	577	35.44	
Liberal	Rev. James Wright Sawle	561	34.46	
Liberal	William Campbell Walker	334	20.52	−52.59
Independent	James Brown	156	9.58	
Majority		16	0.98	−45.23
Turnout		1,628	52.36	+4.99
Registered electors		3,109		

=== 1887 election ===
1887 general election: Ashburton
Party	Candidate	Votes	%	±%
Independent	William Campbell Walker	878	73.11	+23.49
Independent	Charles Purnell	323	26.89	
Majority		555	46.21	−5.30
Turnout		1,201	47.38	+44.33
Registered electors		2,535		

=== 1884 election ===
1884 general election: Ashburton
Party	Candidate	Votes	%	±%
Independent	William Walker	449	49.61	
Independent	Cathcart Wason	432	47.73	
Independent	Samuel Charles Jolly	23	2.54	
Independent	JRCC Graham	1	0.11	
Majority		17	1.88	
Turnout		905	52.68	
Registered electors		1,718		
