= Joseph Ivess =

New Zealand politician

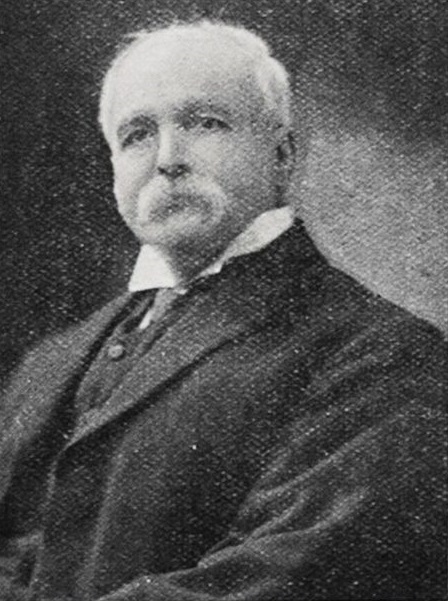
Ivess, circa 1905.

Joseph Ivess (8 February 1844 – 4 September 1919) was a member of the New Zealand House of Representatives. He had an association with a large number of newspapers.

== Early life and Australia ==
Joseph Ivess was born in Askeaton, County Limerick, Ireland in 1844. His parents were John Pope Ivess and Anne Southwell. The family emigrated to Melbourne, Australia on the barque, Alcyone, leaving Liverpool in September 1852. Four of his obituaries said he attended Barnett's Grammar School in Emerald Hill, but no other sources mention such a school. His father became a police sergeant. In 1864, he married Sarah Ann Reddin at Castlemaine, Victoria. In 1865 a Joseph Ivess, printer, was owed £38 in Maldon. In 1866, he worked on the staff of the Bendigo Independent. A photograph of Ivess with his family shows nine children. His obituaries listed 8 surviving children, Mrs Helena Lister, Mrs Barrett, Florence and Elizabeth Ivess, all living in Christchurch, John Ivess (Palmerston North), Joseph Ivess and Charles Ivess, a billiard saloon owner in Gisborne.

== New Zealand ==
On his arrival in New Zealand in 1868 he began work as the manager, and perhaps printer, of the New Zealand Celt at Hokitika. It is hardly surprising that an Irishman emigrating from Melbourne to New Zealand would land at Hokitika. The West Coast gold fields were at that time full of fellow countrymen and shipping routes made that coast a natural landfall. Ivess probably found employment rapidly as the manager of the New Zealand Celt, the Irish Catholic Party's newspaper whose proprietor John Manning was charged with seditious libel for erecting a memorial to the Fenian martyrs of Manchester in the Hokitika Cemetery. It may have been in this heady political atmosphere that the seeds of Ivess's political ambitions were planted and nurtured. By 1870 Ivess had definitely established a printing business at Hokitika in partnership with George Tilbrook, as shown by advertisements in the first issue of the Tomahawk (5 March 1870) and subsequent issues. This heavily satirical weekly and its successor, the Lantern, must also have encouraged Ivess in his political aspirations, for they relied on criticism of local and national political events for their effect. Even at this early stage in his career Ivess demonstrated a propensity for attracting legal action, being named as a defendant in a libel action in the Tomahawk (16 and 30 April 1870). To be fair, Ivess was not alone among newspapermen in being sued frequently. Conservative libel laws were retained in New Zealand long after they had been redrafted in England and resulted in frequent lawsuits of which Ivess attracted his fair share.

He remained in and about the West Coast for the next eight years, but after 1875 his base became the Canterbury region, and particularly Ashburton. He started 45 newspapers in New South Wales and New Zealand.

=== Political career ===
New Zealand Parliament
Years	Term	Electorate	Party
1882–1884	8th	Wakanui	Independent
1885–1887	9th	Wakanui	Independent

Ivess represented the Inangahua electorate on the Nelson Provincial Council from 21 January 1873 until the abolition of the Provinces on 31 October 1876.

He used his various newspaper interests to increase his name recognition for election purposes. In September 1875, the first hint appeared that he would challenge Harry Atkinson in the Egmont electorate at the next general election, although it was clear that he would not stand a chance against the Colonial Treasurer. The election was held on 3 January 1876 and Atkinson defeated Ivess by 225 votes to 73.

Ivess was one of the original nine councillors of the Ashburton Borough Council in September 1878. He was beaten by Hugo Friedlander for the Ashburton mayoralty in November 1879. Ivess contested the Wakanui electorate in South Canterbury in the 1881 election against Cathcart Wason and Charles Purnell. Ivess petitioned against Wason's election win on numerous grounds. The election petitions court started hearing the case in February 1882. Members were sworn in on 18 May 1882 for the first session of the 8th Parliament. Wason was not present. On the following day, the results of the various election petitions were read out, and the 1881 Wakanui election was declared void. Wason lost his seat in Parliament without having ever taken it. A 16 June 1882 by-election was held, which was contested by Alfred Saunders and Ivess. Ivess and Saunders received 604 and 541 votes, and Ivess was thus declared elected.

In the 1884 election, Ivess was beaten by John Grigg. Grigg resigned in mid-1885, and this caused the 1885 by-election, at which Ivess was re-elected.

Having moved to the North Island, Ivess contested the Napier electorate in the 1887 election against the incumbent John Davies Ormond, but was beaten. After that, he lived in New South Wales for some years.

Back in New Zealand from 1893, he concentrated his activities in the North Island, especially in the Taranaki and Rangitikei areas. He returned for some years to Ashburton around the turn of the century, and from 1903 based himself in the central North Island. A description of Ivess in late 1875 portrayed him as a "fine plump man with a well-groomed appearance. He wore a moustache and a little bunch of hair on his under lip, as was customary in some professional men of those days. . . . Always an optimist, it was hard for others to compete with him."

Ivess stood in several more elections, including Ashburton in 1896, and Selwyn in 1902, 1905 and 1908 (every time beaten by Charles Hardy). He contested the 1911 election in the Waimarino electorate as an Independent Liberal, but was eliminated in the first ballot.

=== Death and commemoration ===
Ivess died on 4 September 1919 in Christchurch, New Zealand and was buried at Linwood Cemetery two days later.

In 1994 Ivess Peak was officially named after Joseph Ivess. At 1,749 m (5,738 ft), it is the tallest peak in the Victoria Ranges, between Reefton, Springs Junction and Maruia, in the South Island. Inangahua Herald, Reefton's first newspaper, was founded by Ivess in 1872.
