= Well Hall, Lincolnshire =

Country house in Well, Lincolnshire, England

Coordinates: 53°14′21″N 0°09′59″E

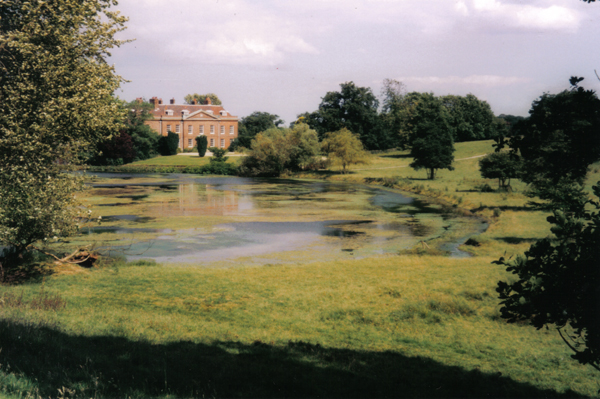
Well Hall and one of its lakes in 1993

Well Hall (or Wellvale Hall) is a country house within the civil parish and estate village of Well, Lincolnshire, England. The house itself is Grade II* listed on the National Heritage List for England, and its park and gardens are Grade II listed. The red-brick house dates from the early 17th century, but was altered in about 1730 for James Bateman, and extended in the late 18th century for Francis Dashwood. It was partly destroyed a fire in 1845, and rebuilt in 1925 by Guy Elwes.

The grounds were first laid out in the early 18th century after the damming of Well Beck to create two lakes, and included moving the village of Well to its present site.
