= Fran Collett =

American-New Zealand journalist (1936–1972)

Bebe Fran Collett (6 November 1936 — 30 June 1972) was an American-New Zealand journalist. She was the first woman officially admitted to New Zealand House of Representatives' press gallery.

Born Bebe Fran Baxter, Collett was originally from California. She graduated from the University of Colorado with a Bachelor of Arts in journalism in 1958. After a short lived marriage to Arthur Petersen, she moved to Aotearoa in 1964 with her second husband, Eric Collett. Collett worked as a journalist for the New Zealand Press Association (NZPA). She separated from her husband shortly after their arrival.

In 1965 she joined the parliamentary press gallery as a reporter for NZPA, becoming the first woman to officially do so. Women, including author Robin Hyde, had previously reported on parliament, but had not been allowed to join the gallery. As part of the conditions of her employment, Collett was forbidden to use the press gallery's access to the parliamentary bars. As a female journalist, Collett faced the usual misogynistic speculation about how she obtained information; she (along with the rest of the press gallery) was also spied on by the New Zealand Security Service, who also attempted to recruit her. She had a relationship with cabinet minister Tom Shand, which was an open secret around parliament.

She left the gallery in 1967. She later covered industrial relations for the New Zealand Broadcasting Corporation, then worked as a sub-editor for The Dominion and then later the Sunday Times.

Collett died of acute respiratory failure in June 1972. Her papers, deposited in the Alexander Turnbull Library in 2005, revealed a series of relationships with MPs and government ministers when researched in 2026.
