= Charles Parnell =

Charles Parnell may refer to:

- Charles Parnell (actor) (born 1964), American actor
- Charles Stewart Parnell (1846–1891), Irish nationalist politician

== See also ==
- Charles Purnell, New Zealand soldier, lawyer, and publisher
