= 1872 Coleridge by-election =

New Zealand by-election

The 1872 Coleridge by-election was a by-election held on 23 July 1872 in the Coleridge electorate in the Canterbury region of New Zealand during the 5th New Zealand Parliament.

The by-election was caused by the resignation of the incumbent MP John Karslake Karslake on 12 April 1872.

The by-election was won by William Bluett, by the narrow margin of seven votes (with several votes not allowed as electors were either not qualified or arrived late).

== Results ==
1872 Coleridge by-election
| Party | Candidate | Votes | % | ±% |
|---|---|---|---|---|
| Independent | William Bluett | 106 | 41.90 | |
| Independent | George Hart | 99 | 39.13 | |
| Independent | John Jebson | 48 | 18.97 | |
| Turnout | | 253 | | |
| Majority | | 7 | 2.77 | |
