= Robert McMillan (farmer) =

New Zealand politician and farmer (1887–1962)

The Honourable Robert McMillan

Member of the New Zealand Legislative Council
- In office 22 June 1950 – 31 December 1950

Personal details
- Born: Robert Thomas McMillan; 1887 Methven, New Zealand
- Died: 8 September 1962 (aged 75) Christchurch, New Zealand
- Party: National Party
- Spouse: Marion Abbott (m. 1917)
- Relations: David McMillan (uncle)

Robert Thomas McMillan (1887 – 8 September 1962) of Irwell, Canterbury, was appointed a member of the suicide squad of the New Zealand Legislative Council in 1950. A farmer known for his quality rams, he served on a multitude of boards and organisations.

== Early life and farming ==
McMillan was born in 1887 in Methven. His father, William McMillan from Ayrshire, Scotland, had come to New Zealand in 1865 alongside his brother David. His father had farms in Methven (Cairnbrae, from 1875) and Irwell (Sudeley, from 1890). Later, Robert's older brother John farmed Cairnbrae. William retired to Cashmere in 1911. Robert leased the Sudeley property from 1912, before buying it at auction in 1927. He became well known as a breeder of rams.

== Public and community service ==
In 1927, McMillan was president of the Ellesmere Agricultural and Pastoral Show. In 1933, he was one of the founders of the United Wheat Growers Ltd. He was initially a director and, from 1946 to 1956, he was the organisation's chairman. He had a seat on the Barley Committee and was a member of the Barley Advisory Council. He was a member, and for some time chairman, of the Canterbury Progress League. He was also elected onto the North Canterbury Hospital Board. He held membership of the Canterbury Chamber of Commerce council and was for a time the council's president. He was elected onto the Ellesmere County Council and for some time, he was the county's chairman. He was an inaugural member of the Springs-Ellesmere Electric Power Board and chaired the board for several terms. For the Farmers' Union, he was chairman of the North Canterbury provincial executive. He was a member of the Ellesmere Licensing Trust, and a member and chairman of the North Canterbury Primary Production Council.

McMillan was a member of the Lyttelton Harbour Board from 1929. From 1937 to 1939, he chaired the board. In 1942, he was elected onto the board of governors of the Canterbury Agricultural College (now Lincoln University).

McMillan was appointed as a member of the suicide squad nominated by the First National Government in 1950 to vote for the abolition of the Council. Most of the new members (like McMillan) were appointed on 22 June 1950, and served until 31 December 1950 when the Council was abolished. His uncle David had represented the Coleridge electorate in the 1880s.

== Family and death ==
McMillan married Marion Abbott from Little Rakaia in May 1917; she was also from a farming family. They had five children, but lost their eldest son in 1932 when he was fourteen. Two sons took over Sudeley in the 1960s. Aged 75, McMillan died on 8 September 1962 in Christchurch and was buried at Ellesmere Cemetery. He was survived by his wife and four of their children.
