= 1879 Coleridge by-election =

New Zealand by-election

The 1879 Coleridge by-election was a by-election held on 8 May 1879 in the Coleridge electorate in the Canterbury region of New Zealand during the 6th New Zealand Parliament.

The by-election was caused by the resignation of the incumbent MP Cathcart Wason on 14 April 1879.

The by-election was won by George Hart. He was unopposed, and "little interest was taken in the election".
