= Barrhill =

Barrhill may refer to:

- Barrhill, South Ayrshire, a village in South Ayrshire, Scotland

- Barrhill railway station, a railway station in South Ayrshire on the Glasgow South Western Line

- Barrhill, New Zealand, a lightly populated locality in the Canterbury region of New Zealand's South Island

== See also ==
- Bar Hill
- Bar Hill Fort, the Roman fort on the Antonine Wall
