= 1885 Wakanui by-election =

New Zealand by-election

The 1885 Wakanui by-election was a by-election held on 11 December 1885 in the Wakanui electorate during the 9th New Zealand Parliament.

The by-election was caused by the resignation of the incumbent MP John Grigg on 4 June 1885.

The by-election was won by Joseph Ivess.

== Results ==
The following table gives the election result:

1885 Wakanui by-election
Party	Candidate	Votes	%	±%
Independent	Joseph Ivess	605	52.79	
Independent	Edward George Wright	541	47.21	
Majority		64	5.58	
Turnout		1146		
