= John Karslake =

John Karslake may refer to:

- John Burgess Karslake (1821 - 1881), English lawyer
- John Karslake Karslake 19th century New Zealand politician
