= Hugo Friedlander =

New Zealand businessman and politician

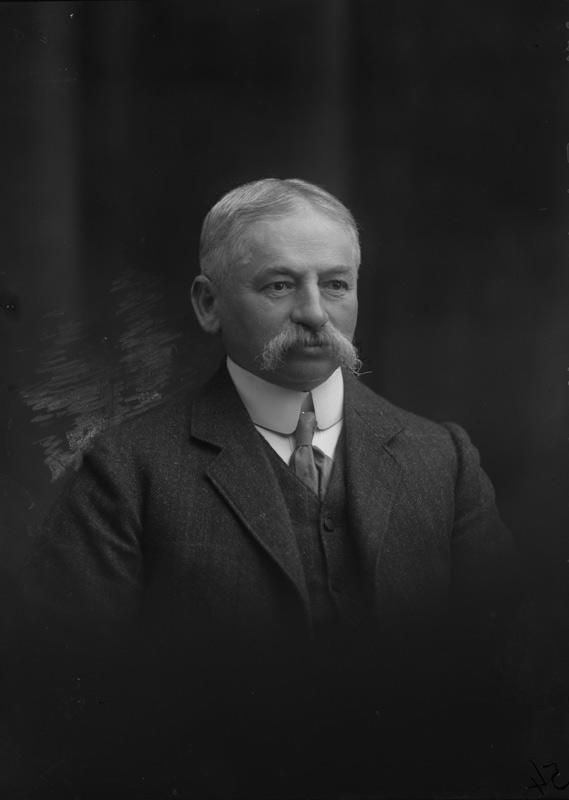
- Friedlander in circa 1910

2nd Mayor of Ashburton
- In office 17 December 1879 – 21 December 1881
- Preceded by: Thomas Bullock
- Succeeded by: Donald Williamson
- In office 17 December 1890 – July 1892
- Preceded by: David Thomas
- Succeeded by: Richard Bird
- In office 21 December 1898 – 8 May 1901
- Preceded by: Charles Reid
- Succeeded by: William Henry Collins

Personal details
- Born: Hugo Friedländer c. January 1850 Kolmar, Province of Posen, Prussia
- Died: 1 October 1928 Remuera, Auckland, New Zealand
- Occupation: businessman, politician

Hugo Friedlander (born Friedländer, c. January 1850 – 1 October 1928) was a New Zealand businessman, local politician, and horse breeder from Ashburton.

Friedlander was born in a Jewish family in Kolmar, in the Prussian Province of Posen in 1850. The Victorian gold rush attracted him and his two brothers, Rudolph and Max, to come out to Australia. The brothers came to New Zealand in the late 1860s. At first, Friedlander lived in Orari working for Joseph Mendelson, riding into Ashburton every morning for an 8 am arrival (a distance of about 45 kilometres or 28 miles).

Friedlander moved to Ashburton in 1872. In 1876, the three brothers bought Mendelson's business, which they renamed Friedlander Brothers. They were grain, wool, and general merchant, acted as auctioneers, and worked as commission agents. He co-owned the Ashburton Guardian from 1880 to 1885 with Edward George Wright. So that his children could learn Hebrew, he arranged for the minister of the Beth El Synagogue in Christchurch to come to Ashburton once a week to give tuition.

Friedlander was the second Mayor of Ashburton. He first contested the role in November 1879, when he narrowly defeated Joseph Ivess by 91 votes to 84; Friedlander was installed on 17 December. A year later, Friedlander was re-elected unopposed. He did not stand for re-election in 1881 and his successor, Donald Williamson, was installed on 21 December. Friedlander stood for the mayoralty in November 1890 and was returned unopposed; he was installed on 17 December. In November 1891, he was re-elected unopposed. At the borough council meeting on 4 July 1892, he announced his resignation as an urgent trip to England for business purposes was required (with him leaving on 21 July); the date his resignation took effect was not recorded in the newspapers.

In November 1898, Friedlander challenged the incumbent mayor, Charles Reid, on a number of issues. In a lively meeting called by Friedlander and chaired by Major William Steward (M.H.R.), the candidates discussed the issues. At 204 votes to 139, Friedlander won the election and was installed on 21 December. In November 1899, Friedlander was initially challenged by William Henry Collins for the mayoralty, but Collins changed his mind and withdrew from the election, with Friedlander thus declared elected unopposed. The voting date shifted during his next term from November to April, and Friedlander did not contest the mayoral election. His successor, Collins, was installed on 8 May 1901.

Friedlander was a member of the Lyttelton Harbour Board from 1905 to 1916, and was the chairman of the board from 23 February 1909 to 7 May 1913.

Friedlander left for Auckland in 1918 due to anti-German feelings caused by World War I. He settled in Remuera, where he died at his residence on 1 October 1928.

Political offices
Preceded by Thomas Bullock	Mayor of Ashburton; 1879–1881; 1890–1892; 1898–1901	Succeeded by Donald Williamson
Preceded by David Thomas	Mayor of Ashburton; 1879–1881; 1890–1892; 1898–1901	Succeeded by Richard Bird
Preceded by Charles Reid	Mayor of Ashburton; 1879–1881; 1890–1892; 1898–1901	Succeeded by William Henry Collins
Preceded by George Laurenson	Chairman of the Lyttelton Harbour Board; 1909–1913	Succeeded by Richard Moore
