= Wakanui (electorate) =

Wakanui was a rural parliamentary electorate in the south Canterbury region of New Zealand, from 1881 to 1887.

== Population centres ==
The previous electoral redistribution was undertaken in 1875 for the 1875–1876 election. In the six years since, New Zealand's European population had increased by 65%. In the 1881 electoral redistribution, the House of Representatives increased the number of European representatives to 91 (up from 84 since the 1875–76 election). The number of Māori electorates was held at four. The House further decided that electorates should not have more than one representative, which led to 35 new electorates being formed, including Wakanui, and two electorates that had previously been abolished being recreated. This necessitated a major disruption to existing boundaries.

This electorate is in the rural parts of south Canterbury. In the 1881 election, polling booths were in Ashburton, Rakaia, Longbeach and Seafield (a locality some 13 km east of Ashburton). The electorate was named for the rural locality Wakanui.

== History ==
Wakanui was formed for the 1881 general election, i.e. for the 8th New Zealand Parliament. It existed for two parliamentary terms until 1887.

The first elected representative was Cathcart Wason, who had contested the 9 December 1881 election against Joseph Ivess and O. W. Purnell. Ivess petitioned against the election on numerous grounds. The election petitions court started hearing the case in February 1882. Members were sworn in on 18 May 1882 for the first session of the 8th Parliament. Wason was not present. On the following day, the results of the various election petitions were read out, and the 1881 Wakanui election was declared void. Wason lost his seat in Parliament without having ever taken it.

A 16 June 1882 by-election was held, which was contested by Alfred Saunders and Ivess. Ivess and Saunders received 604 and 541 votes, and Ivess was thus declared elected. He represented Wakanui until 1884.

In the 1884 election, Ivess was beaten by John Grigg. Grigg resigned in mid-1885, and this caused the 1885 by-election, at which Ivess was re-elected.

=== Members of Parliament ===
If Wason is counted, Wakanui had three representatives:

Key

Independent

Election	Winner
1881 election	Cathcart Wason
1882 by-election	Joseph Ivess
1884 election	John Grigg
1885 by-election	Joseph Ivess

== Election results ==
=== 1885 by-election ===
1885 Wakanui by-election
Party	Candidate	Votes	%	±%
Independent	Joseph Ivess	605	52.79	
Independent	Edward George Wright	541	47.21	
Majority		64	5.58	
Turnout		1146		

=== 1882 by-election ===
1882 Wakanui by-election
Party	Candidate	Votes	%	±%
Independent	Joseph Ivess	605	52.79	
Independent	Alfred Saunders	541	47.21	
Majority		64	5.58	
Turnout		1146		

=== 1881 election ===
1881 general election: Wakanui
Party	Candidate	Votes	%	±%
Independent	Cathcart Wason	445	46.65	
Independent	Joseph Ivess	435	45.60	
Independent	Charles Purnell	74	7.76	
Majority		10	1.05	
Turnout		954	86.81	
Registered electors		1,099		
