= Charles Albert Creery Hardy =

New Zealand politician

New Zealand Parliament
Years	Term	Electorate	Party
1899–1902	14th	Selwyn	Independent
1902–1905	15th	Selwyn	Independent
1905–1908	16th	Selwyn	Independent
1908–1909	17th	Selwyn	Independent
1909–1911	Changed allegiance to:		Reform

Charles Albert Creery Hardy (23 September 1843 – 29 August 1922) was an independent conservative Member of Parliament in New Zealand.

He was elected to the Selwyn electorate in the 1899 general election, but was defeated in 1911, when he was a candidate for the then newly formed Reform Party.

In 1902, 1905 and 1908, he was opposed by Joseph Ivess.

He was appointed to the Legislative Council on 26 June 1913. At the end of his term, he was reappointed on 25 June 1920. He remained a member until his death on 29 August 1922.

He was a fern collector and showed a collection of ferns at the Ashburton Industrial Exhibition in 1880.

== Notes ==
New Zealand Parliament
Preceded by Cathcart Wason	Member of Parliament for Selwyn; 1899–1911	Succeeded by William Dickie
