= St Michael's Church, Yanworth =

The Church of St. Michael, Yanworth
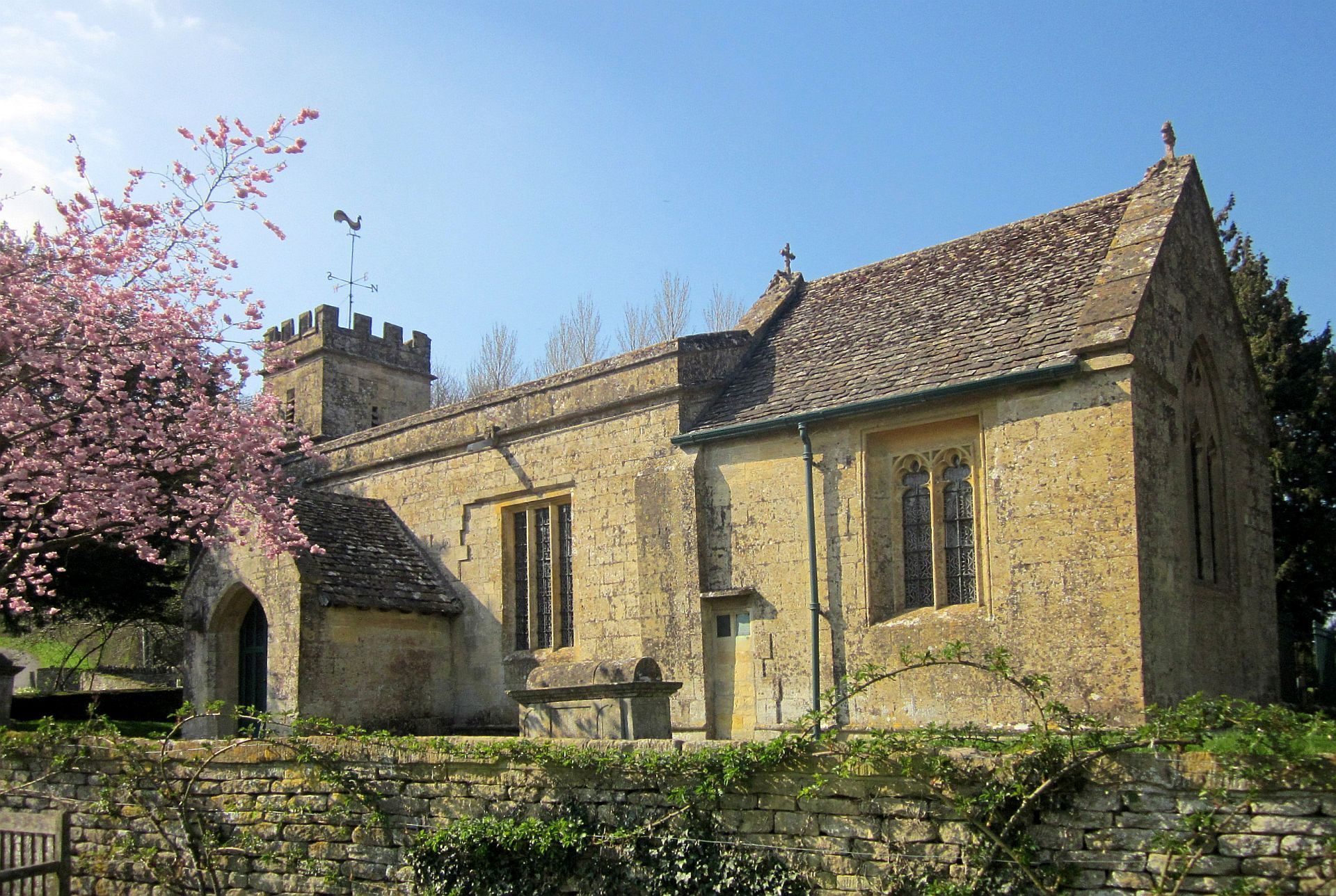
- The Church of St. Michael, Yanworth
- 51.823521°N 1.886406°W
- OS grid reference: SP 07925 13883
- Location: Yanworth, Gloucestershire
- Country: England
- Denomination: Anglican

History
- Status: Parish church
- Dedication: St Michael

Architecture
- Functional status: Active
- Heritage designation: Grade II*
- Architectural type: Church

The Church of St. Michael is the parish church of Yanworth, Gloucestershire, England. The church is a Grade II* listed building dating from the late-12th and 15th centuries. The church stands isolated from Yanworth village adjacent to Church Farm.

== History ==
Like many churches in the Cotswolds, isolation of the church from the village was likely due to the Black Death, which swept through Gloucestershire and Oxfordshire in the 14th century. In order to try to contain the epidemic, many houses were destroyed and burnt to the ground, leaving only the church and a few substantial buildings standing.

== Exterior ==
The church has been described as "remarkable for its fine-jointed ashlar exterior, and pretty grouping of roofs". The north wall of the chancel is made of limestone rubble mixed with some dressed stone, suggesting that this wall was once part of an earlier building. The roof is of stone slate except for the nave, which is leaded. A 12th-century moulded plinth surrounds the church. A miniature tower, dating from the 15th century, stands flush with the west wall. Gargoyles can be seen on the north and south sides of the church but most have been defaced.

Marks on the wall of the north transept may be the result of shrapnel damage from the Civil War.

== Interior ==
The interior has a plastered four-bay nave with a 12th-century transitional chancel arch. The north transept arch is slightly later with a hooded mould and two chamfered orders. A fine carving of a woman's face can be seen below the right hand impost. A tall narrow chamfered arch has been formed between the nave and the tower. The roof of the nave is 19th-century and braced with tie beams supported by (estimated) 15th-century corbels formed into grotesque carved heads.
