= William Dickie =

New Zealand politician

William James Dickie (10 April 1869 – 24 June 1921) was a Liberal Party Member of Parliament in New Zealand, and opposition Whip.

== Biography ==
New Zealand Parliament
Years	Term	Electorate	Party
1911–1914	18th	Selwyn	Liberal
1914–1919	19th	Selwyn	Liberal

Dickie was one of six children; he was born in Cobden, Westland, on 10 April 1869 to William Dickie (who had arrived in New Zealand in the late 1850s from Menstrie, Scotland) and Mary Dent, who were early settlers to Greymouth. He farmed 2,550 acres (10.3 km^{2}) with Arthur Ingham Dent from 1902 in Lyndhurst near Ashburton.

He won the Selwyn electorate in 1911, and again in December 1914. The electorate was abolished for the 1919 election, and he was defeated in 1919 by William Nosworthy standing for Ashburton.

From 1916 until 1919 he was the Liberal Party's junior whip.

Dickie committed suicide on 24 June 1921 at his farm in Lyndhurst; he died from a gunshot wound to the head. Dickie was buried at the Methven cemetery. He was survived by his wife, three sons, Colin, Deacon and Alan and four daughters Mary Ellen, Margaret, Catherine and Herwini.

== Notes ==
New Zealand Parliament
Preceded by Charles Hardy	Member of Parliament for Selwyn; 1911–1919	In abeyance Title next held by John McAlpine
