= David McMillan (politician) =

New Zealand politician (1836–1904)

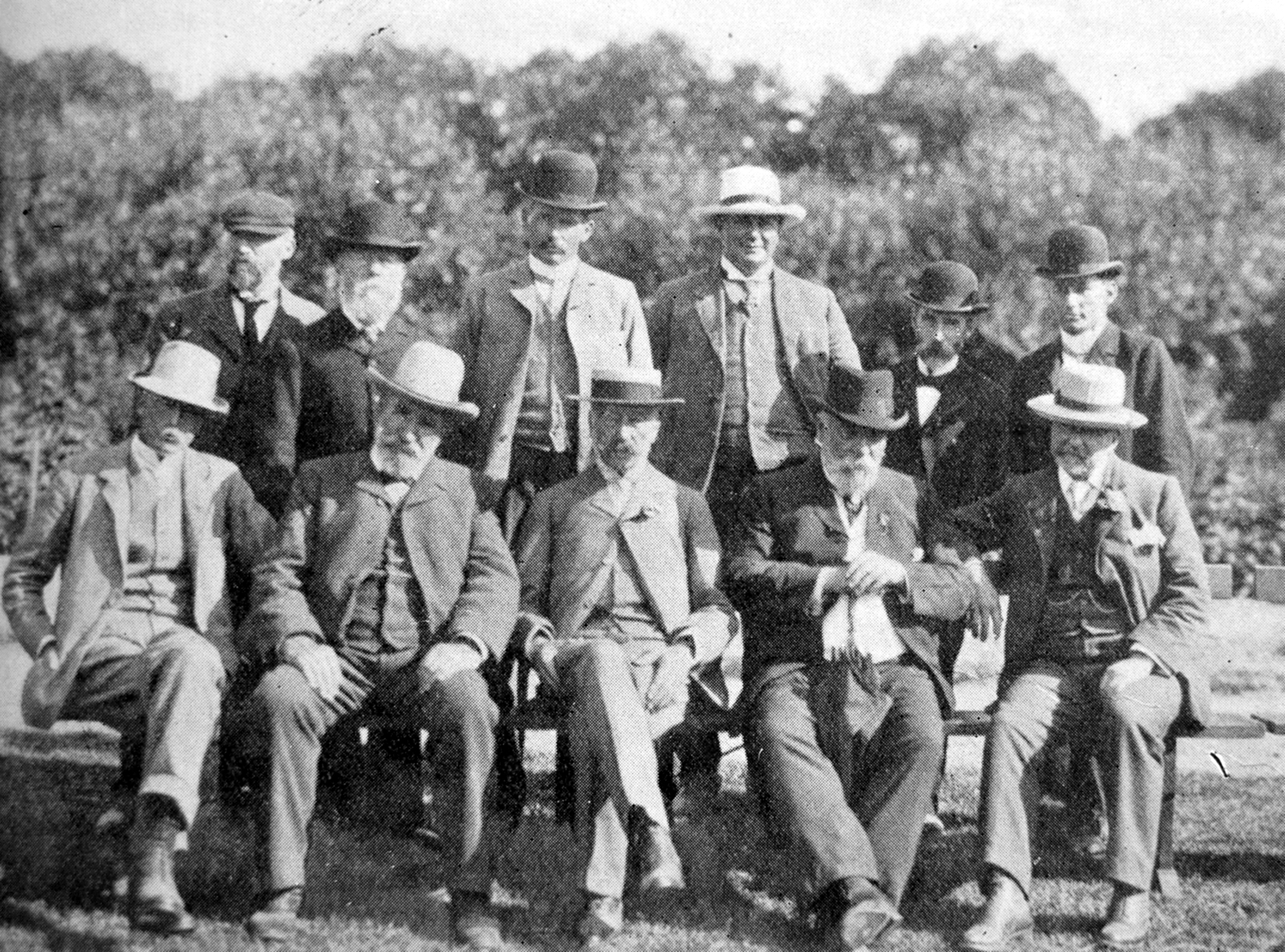
McMillan (seated; second from left) with Canterbury Agricultural College Board of Governors and staff in 1903

New Zealand Parliament
Years	Term	Electorate	Party
1881–1884	8th	Coleridge	Independent
1884–1887	9th	Coleridge	Independent

David McMillan (1836 – 6 July 1904) was a 19th-century Member of Parliament in the Canterbury region of New Zealand.

He came to New Zealand on the Rose of Sharon in 1857 and settled near Southbridge. From 1874, he held various local political roles. He was on the Selwyn County Council from the beginning and chaired the body for 11 years.

He represented the Coleridge electorate from 1881 to 1887, when he retired.

In 1900, he visited his native Scotland. He died on 6 July 1904 and was buried at Ellesmere Cemetery. Robert McMillan was his nephew.

New Zealand Parliament
Preceded by Edward George Wright	Member of Parliament for Coleridge; 1881–1887	Constituency abolished
