= Joseph Colborne-Veel =

New Zealand journalist (1831–1895)

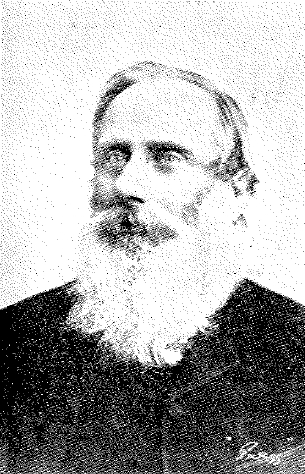
- Portrait of Joseph Colborne-Veel (year unknown)
- Born: Joseph Veel Colborne-Veel; 1831; Gloucester, England
- Died: 29 July 1895 (aged 63–64); Christchurch, New Zealand
- Occupations: journalist, educator
- Known for: editor of The Press, secretary of education board
- Children: Mary Colborne-Veel

Joseph Veel Colborne-Veel (1831 – 29 July 1895) was a journalist and educator in Christchurch, New Zealand.

== Early life ==
Colborne-Veel was born in 1831 in Gloucester, England and received his early education at Kidderminster. Sources differ whether he graduated in 1856 with honours from Magdalen College, Oxford, or from the adjacent but unrelated Magdalen Hall, Oxford. He once won an essay competition, beating Stopford Brooke to second place. Brooke later made a career as a writer, but in the essay competition, his style was marked "too flowery", whilst Veel was judged having used "good, straight-forward, sensible English." In his younger days, he was a successful athlete and once won the lightweight sculls in Oxford. Once in Christchurch, he frequently appeared in the media as a cricketer. In his later life, he was a keen chess player. He married Anne Maria Anstey (1840–1910) in 1857, who was also from Gloucestershire.

== Life in New Zealand ==
Immediately after the wedding, they emigrated to New Zealand on the Glentanner, arriving in Lyttelton on 3 October 1857. With strong ties to the Anglican church, he had a letter of introduction with him to James FitzGerald, who had just gone to England as Canterbury's immigration agent (1857–1860), though. Colborne-Veel initially went farming in Linwood and marked exam papers for Christ's College.

He was editor of the Christchurch newspaper The Press from December 1861 to 1878 with a break of several months during 1868. In March 1868, he left during a time a deep economic depression to be sub-editor of the Westland Observer, a newspaper run by George Sale. At The Press, he was replaced by Charles Purnell. Towards the end of that year, the ownership of The Press changed, its publication reverted from three times a week to daily, and Purnell moved on. Colborne-Veel was attracted back as the newspaper's editor by December 1868.

Following his career as a journalist, education in Canterbury was the area that he was most eager to enhance. He resigned from The Press in 1878 to become secretary for the education board was principal of the Christchurch Normal School (1893–1895), and was a member of the Board of Governors of Canterbury College (1875–1895). He died suddenly during a meeting of the Board of Governors on 29 July 1895. He was buried at Barbadoes Street Cemetery. He was survived by his wife, one son, and three daughters; his last residence had been in Montreal Street. His wife died in November 1910.

== Notes ==
Business positions
| Preceded by George Sale | Editor of The Press; 1861–1868; 1868–1878 | Succeeded by Charles Purnell |
| Preceded by Charles Purnell | Editor of The Press; 1861–1868; 1868–1878 | Succeeded by John Steele Guthrie |
