= 1902 Orkney and Shetland by-election =

1902 UK parliamentary by-election

← 1900	18–19 November 1902	1906 →

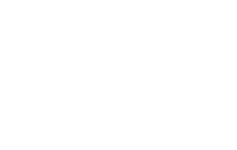
	First party	Second party	Third party
Candidate	Cathcart Wason	Thomas McKinnon Wood	Theodore Angier
Party	Independent Liberal	Liberal	Liberal Unionist
Popular vote	2,412	2,001	740
Percentage	46.8%	38.8%	14.4%
Swing	▲46.8%	▼10.7%	▼36.1%
MP before election
Cathcart Wason
Liberal Unionist
Subsequent MP
Cathcart Wason
Liberal

The 1902 Orkney and Shetland by-election was a Parliamentary by-election held on 18–19 November 1902. The constituency returned one Member of Parliament (MP) to the House of Commons of the United Kingdom, elected by the first past the post voting system.

== Vacancy ==
Cathcart Wason had been Liberal Unionist MP for the seat of Orkney and Shetland since 1900. In July 1902, he decided to cross the floor of the House to sit with the Liberal opposition. Leaving the Liberal Unionist Party, he cited Government policy on the army, the Education Bill and the Irish land question. He faced criticism from the Unionists in his constituency and following pressure, he resigned his seat on 7 October 1902 to contest the subsequent by-election.

== Electoral history ==
Since 1885, the seat had always comfortably returned the Liberal Party candidate. Then the seat was surprisingly gained by Wason; albeit with a narrow majority of forty votes, standing as a Liberal Unionist in 1900.

General election January 1900
Party	Candidate	Votes	%	±%
Liberal Unionist	Cathcart Wason	2,057	50.5	+10.4
Liberal	Leonard Lyell	2,017	49.5	−10.4
Majority		40	1.0	N/A
Turnout		4,074	54.9	−1.0
Liberal Unionist gain from Liberal		Swing		

== Candidates ==
Cathcart Wason in 1902 outside the Houses of Parliament

- Fifty-four-year-old sitting MP Cathcart Wason chose to fight his seat again, standing as an Independent Liberal. He had hoped to stand as the official Liberal candidate, but the local Liberal Association chose not to back him. Although born in Scotland he moved to New Zealand and had served as an Independent Member of Parliament there. He returned to the UK in 1900 in time for the general election to stand as a Liberal Unionist. His father, Rigby Wason had sat as a Whig MP and his older brother Eugene Wason was at the time a Liberal Party MP in Scotland.
- The local Liberal Unionist Association considered several candidates, including Captain John Nicholson, a native of Shetland who had contested Chester-le-Street as a Conservative at the 1900 general election. They eventually selected 59-year-old Theodore Vivian Samuel Angier as their candidate to defend the seat. He had no connection with the islands and was a member of the Liberal Unionist Council. Angier had formerly been a sailor and owned the family steamship business, having volunteered for service in the South African War as well. He was standing for Parliament for the first time.
- In August 1902, the local Liberal Association had selected 47-year-old Thomas McKinnon Wood as their prospective candidate to re-gain the seat. Although born in Stepney, his father was born in Orkney where he was a farmer. Wood was a member of the London County Council for Central Hackney from 1892 and from 1897 he was leader of the Progressive Party and also served as chairman of the council from 1898 to 1899. Wood stood unsuccessfully as a parliamentary candidate for East Islington in 1895 and Glasgow St. Rollox in 1900.

== Campaign ==
Polling Days were fixed for the 18–19 November 1902, over five weeks after Wason's resignation.

== Result ==
Wason remarkably held his seat, with an increased majority of 411 votes.

1902 Orkney and Shetland by-election
Party	Candidate	Votes	%	±%
Independent Liberal	Cathcart Wason	2,412	46.8	+46.8
Liberal	Thomas McKinnon Wood	2,001	38.8	−10.7
Liberal Unionist	Theodore Angier	740	14.4	−36.1
Majority		411	8.0	N/A
Turnout		5,153	68.1	+13.2
Independent Liberal gain from Liberal Unionist		Swing		

Immediately following his re-election, Wason re-took the Liberal Party whip in the House of Commons.

== Aftermath ==
By the time of the 1906 general election, Wason had been fully integrated with the local Liberal Party and was re-elected as their official candidate;

General election January 1906
Party	Candidate	Votes	%	±%
Liberal	Cathcart Wason	3,837	79.0	+29.5
Liberal Unionist	C J Dunlop	1,021	21.0	−29.5
Majority		2,816	58.0	N/A
Turnout		4,858	63.3	+8.4
Liberal gain from Liberal Unionist		Swing		

McKinnon Wood was elected Liberal MP for Glasgow St Rollox at the 1906 general election. Angier was knighted in 1904 and contested unsuccessfully, Gateshead at the 1906 general election.
