= Bodbrane =

Ancient farmstead hamlet in Cornwall, England

Coordinates: 50.40977°N 4.48544°W

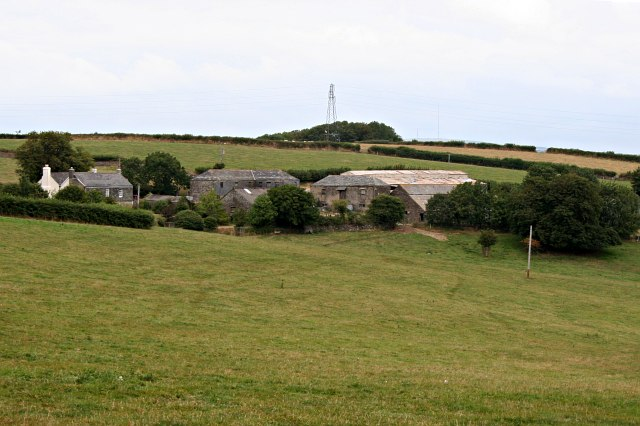
Bodbrane farmstead

Bodbrane is an ancient farmstead hamlet in southeast Cornwall, England, United Kingdom. It is situated about three miles (5 km) south of Liskeard in the civil parish of Duloe.

== History ==
Bodbrane is mentioned in the Domesday Book of 1086 (with the placename Bodbran) and two dozen people are named including Godric the Priest.

In 1558 the manor at Bodbrane was held by John Arundel. However, in 1814, it was recorded that:

The manor of Bodbrane, which belonged to the Arundells of Lanherne, is now the property, by a late purchase, of Mr. Joseph Grigg.

=== John Grigg ===
In 1854, John Grigg became a notable émigré from Bodbrane. According to the Dictionary of New Zealand Biography:

His father died when John was about 16 or 17, and on inheriting the property, Bodbrane, he became responsible for providing for his stepmother and siblings. He had met and fallen in love with Martha Maria Vercoe; when she emigrated to New Zealand with her family, John Grigg decided to follow. After two years of negotiations he sold Bodbrane, and left for Australia on the Blackwall in 1854, arriving in New Zealand before the end of the year.

Grigg began farming in New Zealand at Longbeach (south of Christchurch) and his family farm the same estate to this day. In 1882, Longbeach farm supplied some of the first shipment of frozen meat to England.

== See also ==
- List of places in Cornwall
- History of New Zealand
- Cornish emigration
