= William Maslin =

New Zealand politician

New Zealand Parliament
Years	Term	Electorate	Party
1893–1896	12th	Rangitata	Liberal

William Stephen Maslin (1850 – 19 December 1929) was a Liberal Party Member of Parliament in New Zealand.

== Early life and business interests ==
Maslin was born in Brentford, Middlesex, England in 1850. He came to New Zealand with his parents as a boy; they arrived in Lyttelton on 21 July 1858 on the Maori. His father, a builder and timber trader, went to Timaru later that year and once established, the family followed in early the next year. The family moved to Geraldine in 1861. His father was killed in a construction accident in June 1864 and Maslin, as the eldest boy, took charge of the family and worked as a timber merchant. Once the native trees had all been milled, Maslin's business became a general store; he sold this business in 1883. From then until 1892, he worked as an auctioneer in Timaru and Geraldine. Beyond that, he had a land agency business. Maslin also had farmland for cropping.

Since 1868, Maslin was active in the Methodist Church. He was one of the founders of the Good Templary Lodge in Geraldine. He joined the Southern Star Lodge in 1879 and became a Freemason. He also held membership of the Oddfellows lodge.

== Political career ==
In Geraldine, Maslin was on the School Committee from 1872. Maslin was on the licensing committee for many years. He co-founded the Geraldine town district and was on the town board for 12 years. Maslin was the last chairman of the town board. When Geraldine became a borough in early 1905, he was elected as the inaugural mayor.

He was elected to the Rangitata electorate in the 1893 general election, but retired in 1896. He did not stand in the 1896 general election.

He stood (unsuccessfully) as a prohibitionist for Ashburton in 1899, for Geraldine in 1902, for Waitaki in 1905, Ashburton in 1908, 1911, and 1914. He stood for Clutha in 1919 and contested his last general election in 1922 in the Dunedin Central electorate.

== Family and death ==
Maslin married Hannah Clough of Timaru in 1873. They had four sons and four daughters. Maslin retired to South Dunedin and died at his home in Bay View Road on 19 December 1929. His wife had died in 1907 and was buried at Geraldine cemetery. He was interred in the same plot.
