= George Sale (academic) =

New Zealand academic (1831-1922)

George Samuel Sale
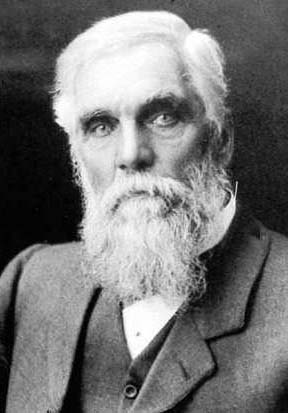
- Sale circa 1906
- Born: 17 May 1831; Rugby, Warwickshire, England
- Died: 25 December 1922 (aged 91); London, England
- Spouse: Margaret Fortune (m. 1874)

Academic work
- Discipline: Classics
- Institutions: Trinity College, Cambridge; University of Otago
- Cricket career

Cricket information
- Batting: Right-handed

Domestic team information
- Years: Team
- 1863/64–1864/65: Canterbury

Career statistics
Competition	First-class
Matches	2
Runs scored	38
Batting average	12.66
100s/50s	0/0
Top score	16
Catches/stumpings	2/–
- Source: CricketArchive, 15 September 2022

George Samuel Sale (17 May 1831 – 25 December 1922) was a New Zealand station manager, cricketer, newspaper editor, goldminer, public administrator and university professor.

== Life and career ==
Sale was born in Rugby, Warwickshire, England, in 1831. He was educated at Rugby School and Cambridge University (Trinity College), where he won the Members Latin Prize. He was elected a Fellow of Trinity in 1856, and in 1857 he began lecturing at Trinity in classics.

Sale went to New Zealand in 1860 for health reasons. In May 1861 he became the first editor of The Press in Christchurch, but later that year he want to the Otago goldfields to take up mining.

In January 1864 he played in the first match of first-class cricket ever played in New Zealand, top-scoring for Canterbury with 15 not out against Otago. In the second first-class match, a year later, he was top-scorer in Canterbury's first innings with 16.

In July 1864, Sale was appointed Treasurer of Canterbury Province. He was a member of the County of Westland, representing the Hokitika riding from 10 December 1868 to 16 April 1869.

When the University of Otago was established in 1870 he was one of the three foundation professors, specialising in classics, particularly Greek and Latin. He remained in that position until he resigned at the end of 1907. He returned to England after he retired, and died in London in December 1922, aged 91.

He married a Canadian, Margaret Fortune, in Kaitangata in June 1874. They had four children (two sons and two daughters).

== Honorific eponym ==
Sale Street in Hokitika is named in Sale's honour.

Business positions
New title Newspaper founded	Editor of The Press; 1861	Succeeded by Joseph Colborne-Veel
