= Barrhill, New Zealand =

Barrhill
- Village
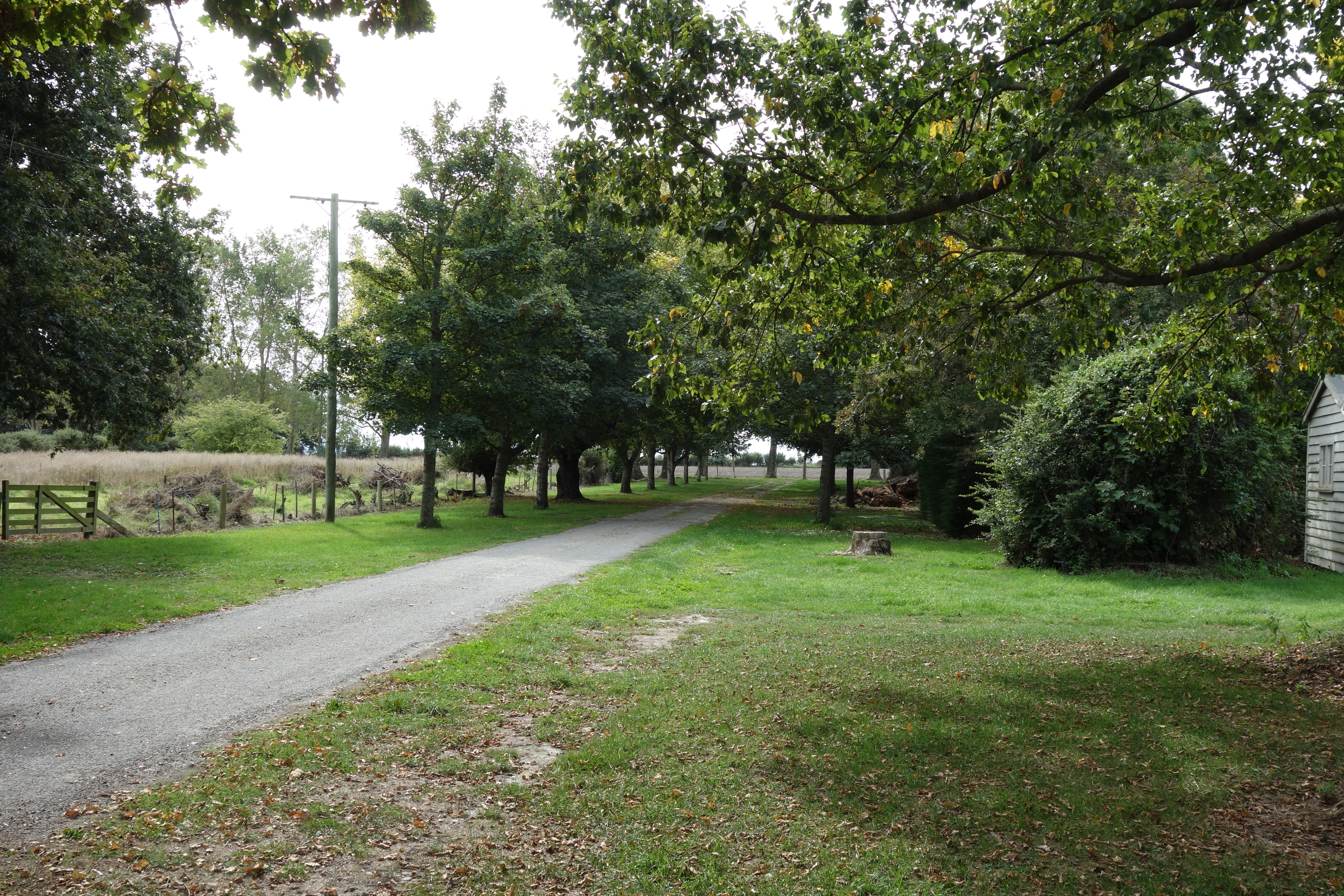
- View along Sycamore Avenue in Barrhill

- Barrhill
- Coordinates: 43°40′22.8″S 171°51′10.8″E
- Country: New Zealand
- Region: Canterbury
- Territorial authority: Ashburton District
- Founded: 1876
- Founder: Cathcart Wason
- Named for: Barrhill, South Ayrshire
- Electorates: Rangitata; Te Tai Tonga (Māori)

Government
  - Territorial authority: Ashburton District Council
  - Regional council: Environment Canterbury
  - Mayor of Ashburton: Liz McMillan
  - Rangitata MP: James Meager
  - Te Tai Tonga MP: Mananui Ramsden

Area
  - Total: 151.82 km^{2} (58.62 sq mi)

Population (2023 census)
  - Total: 315
  - Density: 2.07/km^{2} (5.37/sq mi)
- Postal code: 7782
- Local iwi: Ngāi Tahu

Barrhill is a lightly populated locality in the Canterbury region of New Zealand's South Island. It is situated on the Canterbury Plains, on the right bank of the Rakaia River, about 17 kilometres (11 mi) inland from Rakaia. It was founded by Cathcart Wason in the mid-1870s and named by him after his old home Barrhill in South Ayrshire, Scotland. Wason set it up as a model village for the workers of his large sheep farm. The population of the village peaked in the mid-1880s before the general recession initiated a downturn for the village. Wason had expected for the Methven Branch railway to run past Barrhill, but the line was built in 1880 on an alignment many miles away, which caused Barrhill's population to decrease.

Three of the original buildings of Barrhill plus the gatehouse at Wason's homestead were constructed of concrete, and they still exist to this day. One of those buildings, St John's Church, is registered by Heritage New Zealand as a Category II heritage building, and the gatehouse is a museum that is open on request. Today, few buildings exist in the village, but the formal layout of avenues still exists, giving the setting a charming appearance.

== Geography ==
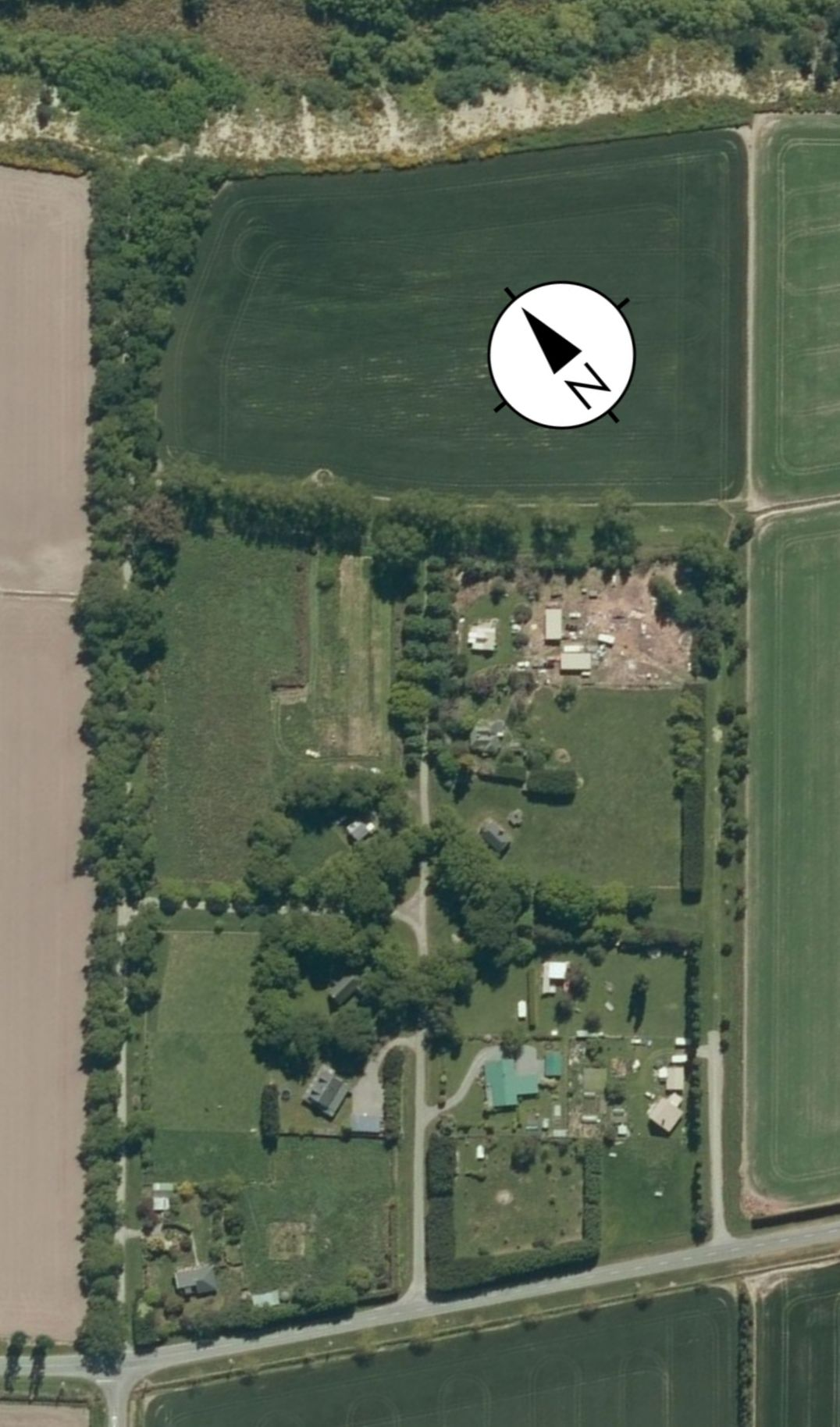
Aerial photo of Barrhill showing what appears to be the three circles of Trinity

Barrhill is a small settlement between the Rakaia Barrhill Methven Road and the Rakaia River, located 210 metres (690 ft) above sea level. It is about 17 kilometres (11 mi) from the town of Rakaia and 21 kilometres (13 mi) from Methven. The four outer streets, one of which is the Rakaia Barrhill Methven Road, form a trapezoid with the longest side at 200 metres (660 ft). Two internal roads run at right angles to one another, dividing the area into four quadrants. The intersection of the internal roads forms the market place.

Apart from the main road, there are five avenues, each planted in its own species and named accordingly: oak, poplar, birch, lime, and sycamore. The tree-lined avenues give Barrhill a charming appearance. Wason had trees planted in an unusual pattern around the market square. Residents only noticed in 1975 when viewing an aerial photo that those trees form what appears to be the three circles of Trinity, with the two inner avenues possibly symbolising a crucifix.

== History ==
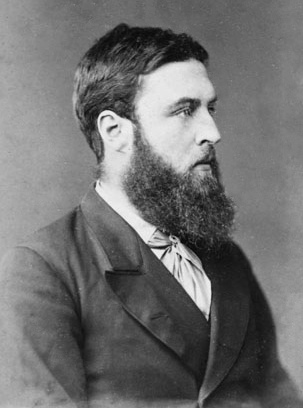
Cathcart Wason in c. 1878

Wason emigrated from Scotland to New Zealand in late 1868. In February 1869 or April 1870 (sources vary), he bought the Lendon sheep run (Run 116) in mid-Canterbury. Lendon was a 20,000 acres (81 km^{2}) run on the south bank of the Rakaia River. The land had first been taken up by John Hall, but had changed ownership several times before Wason bought it, including 1,250 acres (5.1 km^{2}) of freehold land. Wason renamed his property Corwar after his father's lands in Scotland, and the first advertisement placed in newspapers by Wason mentions Corwar in October 1869, hence the April 1870 date appears less likely. Wason set about trying to create an estate village on land bought from the adjacent Lavington run (Run 117). He also bought part of the Hororata Station on the other side of the Rakaia River from John Cordy (Run 67).

His planting of pine trees and of oaks, walnuts and poplars extended over 600 acres (2.4 km^{2}) and allowed shelter from the prevailing north-west winds to allow sheep farming and the growing of wheat, while water power was used for agricultural machinery. He bought and sold land, and by 1882 Corwar was consolidated as a freehold estate of just over 5,000 acres (20 km^{2}) with a large mansion overlooking the river, complete with gate lodge and gate-keeper.

On the estate, Wason built a model village called Barrhill, with avenues forming a grid layout and a central market square. Barrhill had 28 sections, including a post office, bakery, school, church, other facilities, and fifteen cottages were built. Wason named the village after his old home in South Ayrshire, Scotland. The post office opened in 1876 and in the same year, construction of the church began, and these buildings mark the beginning of Barrhill.

However, Wason had expected the Methven Branch railway to be built near Barrhill, but when it was built on a more southerly route along Thompsons Track and what was later to become known as Lauriston, the village began to decline. Dwindling population forced the closure of the school in 1938, although the Church of St John the Evangelist is still in use. Most of the buildings were constructed from pine wood grown on the estate, but the three original concrete buildings remain: church, school and schoolhouse.

Without the railway, Wason saw his project as doomed, and sold up in 1900. A rural mail service was discussed for the Ashburton District in September 1924 and after the contracts were let in February 1925, the Barrhill post office was closed. The school closed in 1938.

The Ashburton Branch of New Zealand Historic Places Trust, since renamed to Heritage New Zealand, unveiled an information panel on Anzac Day in 2012 in Barrhill's market square. It was their last project as a branch committee before the pending disestablishment of branch committees through the Heritage New Zealand Pouhere Taonga Bill, and they chose Barrhill to relaunch themselves as the Historic Places Mid Canterbury regional society as part of the unveiling of the historic panel.

=== Population ===
Barrhill flourished until about 1885, when population in the village itself peaked at 50, and two effects caused a population decline. Firstly, a recession set in across New Zealand that made people move to where work opportunities presented themselves, and locally those opportunities were created near the stations of the Methven Branch railway. Wason began to gradually sell off parts of his land holdings from the mid-1880s.

More recent population data can be obtained from Statistics New Zealand. The smallest unit for which data are available is a meshblock, and Barrhill is located within the meshblock with ID 2750400. This meshblock has an area of 36 square kilometres (14 sq mi), i.e. a rural area much larger than just the village, and 5 square kilometres (1.9 sq mi) is within the river bed. Population in this meshblock was recorded at 60 in the 1996 New Zealand census, 60 in 2001, 69 in 2006, 66 in 2013, 78 in 2018 and 72 in 2023.

More detail is available for the Barrhill locality, which covers 151.82 km^{2} (58.62 sq mi). This is partly in the Cairnbrae and partly in the Chertsey statistical areas.

Historical populations for Barrhill locality
Year	Pop.	±% p.a.
2006	318	—
2013	312	−0.27%
2018	324	+0.76%
2023	315	−0.56%

The locality had a population of 315 in the 2023 New Zealand census, a decrease of 9 people (−2.8%) since the 2018 census, and an increase of 3 people (1.0%) since the 2013 census. There were 174 males and 138 females in 117 dwellings. 1.0% of people identified as LGBTIQ+. There were 78 people (24.8%) aged under 15 years, 48 (15.2%) aged 15 to 29, 144 (45.7%) aged 30 to 64, and 45 (14.3%) aged 65 or older.

People could identify as more than one ethnicity. The results were 91.4% European (Pākehā), 2.9% Māori, 6.7% Asian, and 3.8% other, which includes people giving their ethnicity as "New Zealander". English was spoken by 99.0%, and other languages by 4.8%. No language could be spoken by 1.0% (e.g. too young to talk). The percentage of people born overseas was 22.9, compared with 28.8% nationally.

Religious affiliations were 41.0% Christian, and 1.0% New Age. People who answered that they had no religion were 52.4%, and 5.7% of people did not answer the census question.

Of those at least 15 years old, 60 (25.3%) people had a bachelor's or higher degree, 144 (60.8%) had a post-high school certificate or diploma, and 48 (20.3%) people exclusively held high school qualifications. 42 people (17.7%) earned over $100,000 compared to 12.1% nationally. The employment status of those at least 15 was 147 (62.0%) full-time and 57 (24.1%) part-time.

== Notable places ==
Three buildings in the township remain from the time of its founding. In addition, there is the historic gatehouse some 2.2 kilometres (1.4 mi) northwest of Barrhill. Those buildings remain partly because they were built in concrete, with some of the walls 30 centimetres (12 in) thick. The cement was landed in barrels on Kaitorete Spit, barged across Lake Ellesmere / Te Waihora, and then transported by dray overland and along the bed of the Rakaia River. All four buildings are registered as Category A ("high value") heritage structures by Ashburton District Council.

St John's Church was mostly paid for by Wason, and construction started in 1876, with the first service held on 8 July 1877 by the vicar of Ashburton, W. E. Paige. A vicarage was also envisaged, but it was never built. A lych gate was added as a centennial project. St John's belongs to the Rakaia parish of Te Pīhopatanga o Te Waipounamu (the south island Māori bishopric) of the Anglican Church in Aotearoa, New Zealand and Polynesia, with services each second Sunday of the month. The church was registered as a heritage building by the New Zealand Historic Places Trust (since renamed to Heritage New Zealand) on 23 June 1983 with registration number 1765 classified as C. With the change of the classification system, the building later became a Category II listing. The church is owned by Church Property Trustees (i.e. the Anglican Church).

After the land had been surveyed, the first buyer was the Education Board, securing land for a school in the market square, and a teacher's house on the adjacent section. Both these buildings were also built in concrete and exist to this day. The school was built to a northern hemisphere design and has windows on the south side only to stop children from becoming distracted, but the windows are on the wrong side to utilise the sun. Since the school closed in 1938 it has been used for functions and as a hall. The former teacher's house is used as a bach. Both buildings are owned by Ashburton District Council.

The other remaining 1870s concrete building is the gate house, located some distance away on the Rakaia Barrhill Methven Road. Wason's homestead was at the end of a drive starting at this gate house, on a cliff top overlooking the Rakaia River. The homestead burnt down not long after Wason had left the country, and a new homestead was built nearby. The gatekeeper's lodge originally had a slate roof, but this was later replaced by iron. The last family moved out in 1935. During the second world war, the iron was stripped off the empty building, and it fell into ruin. A later owner, Colin McLachlan, donated the land and the ruin to the people of the district; it is now vested in the Ashburton District Council. The renovation began in 1970, with work carried out and financed by descendants of previous inhabitants of the building. A plaque on the building states that it was reopened in March 1979 by the Prime Minister of the time, Robert Muldoon, but his plane ran late and the opening ceremony was conducted by Colin McLachlan. The gate house is fitted out as a museum, and viewing can be arranged through the Ashburton or Methven information centres.

Barrhill Cemetery is located 200 metres (660 ft) south-west of the village on Lauriston Barrhill Road. It is one of 11 open cemeteries in the Ashburton District. The oldest recorded burial was in 1881.

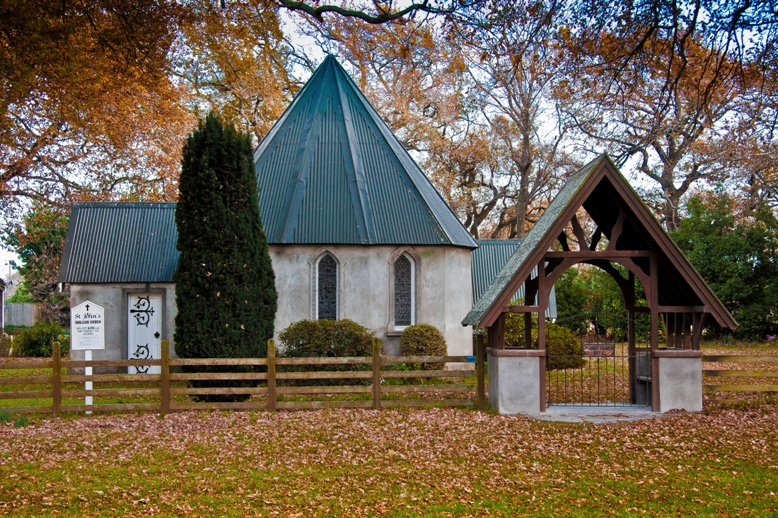
St John's Church

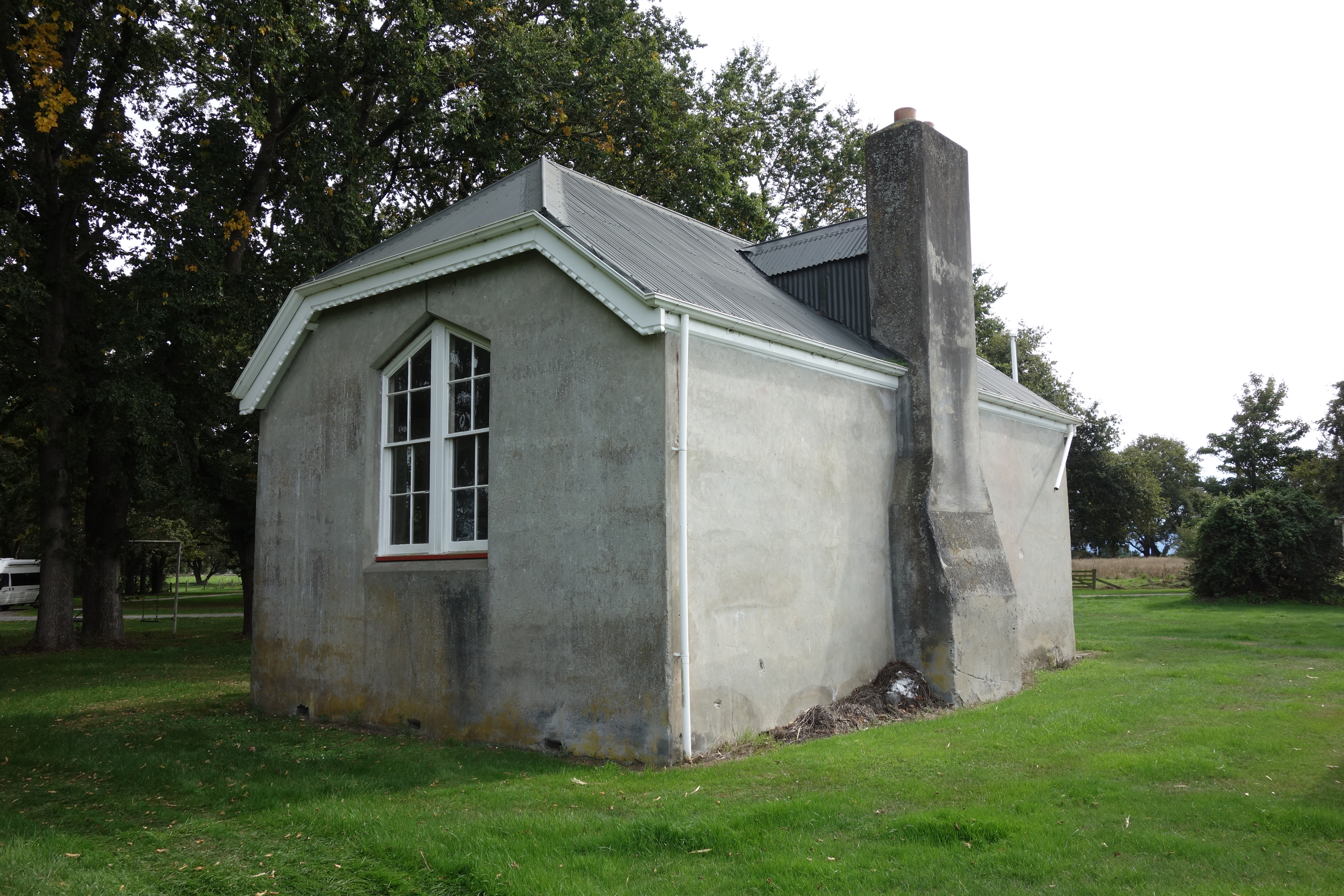
Former school; now community hall

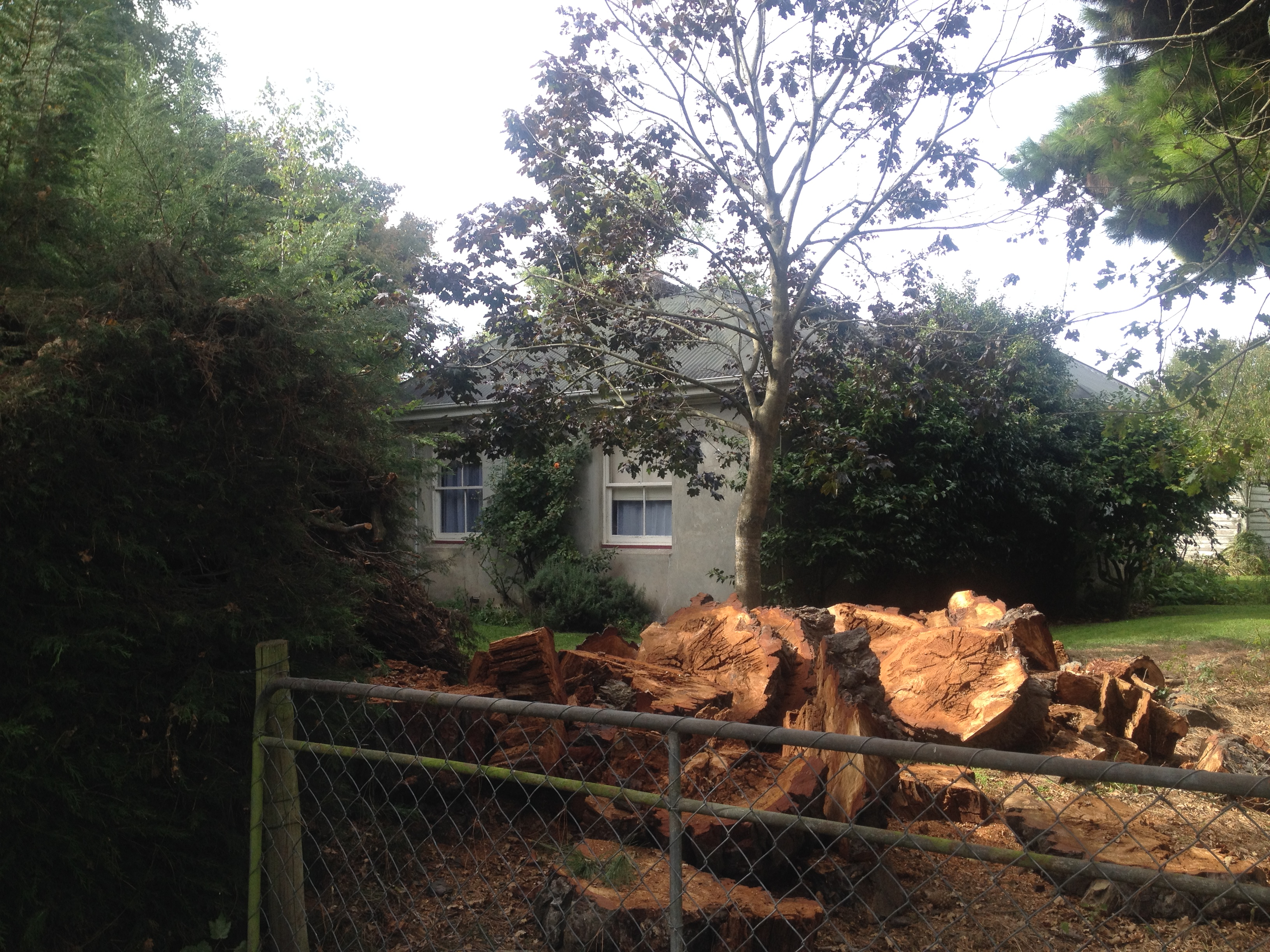
Former teacher's house

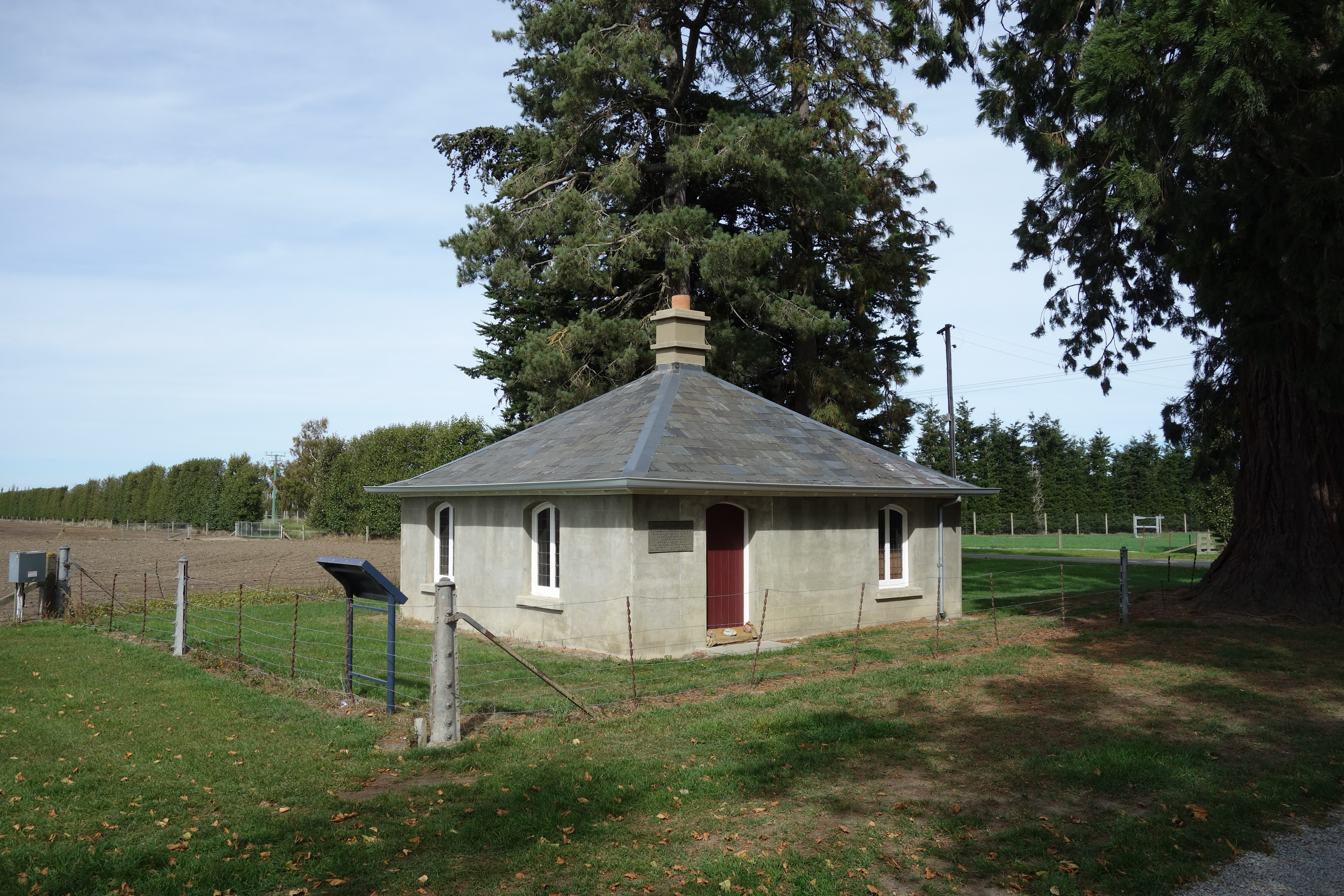
Corwar Gatekeepers Lodge

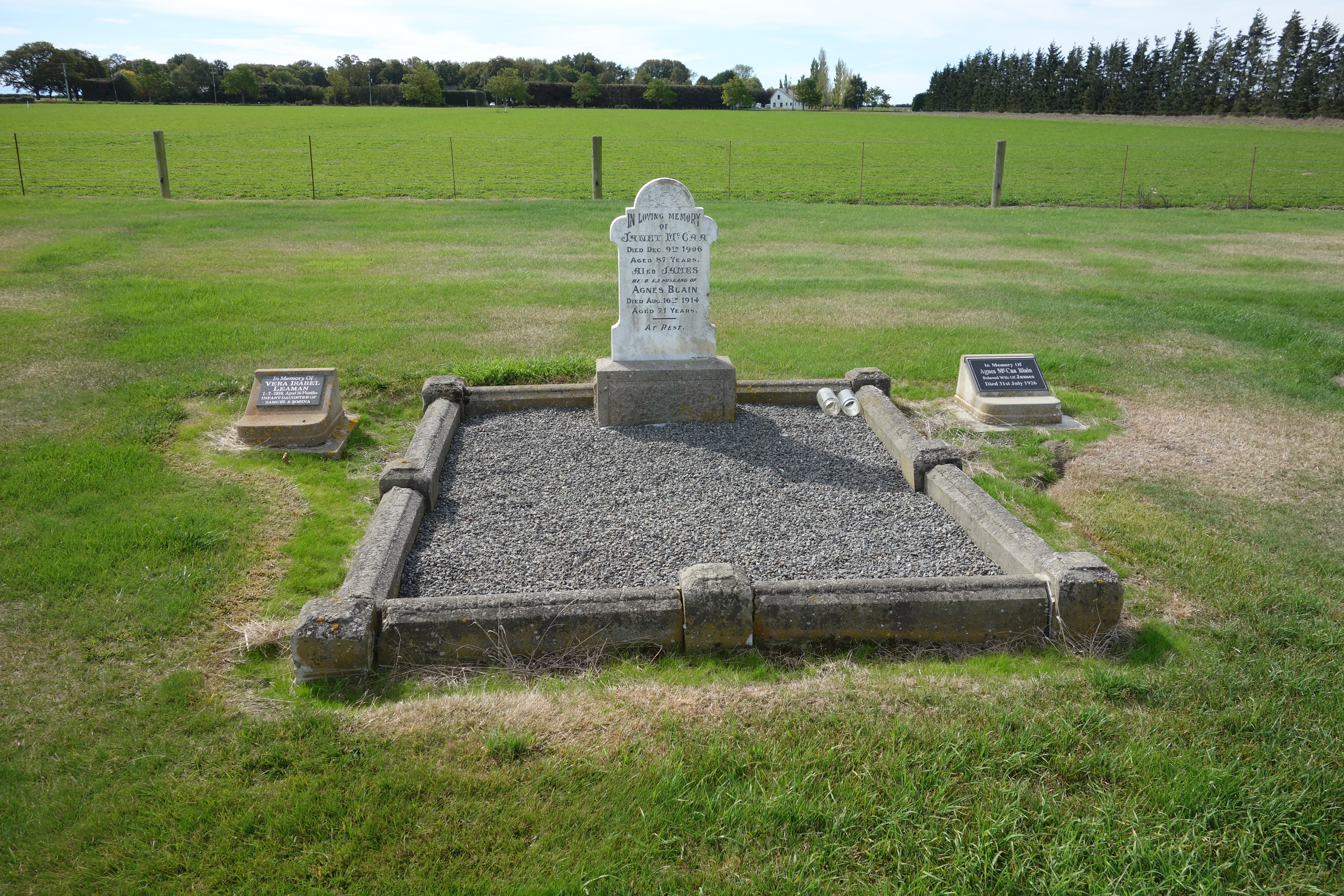
Barrhill Cemetery, with the trees of the village in the background

== Notable people ==
Barrhill's founder, Cathcart Wason, was a member of parliament in two countries: first in New Zealand for a total of six years, and then in the United Kingdom for twenty years. New Zealand actress Tania Nolan, born in nearby Rakaia, lived in Barrhill for two years as a child.
