= George Hart (politician) =

New Zealand politician

New Zealand Parliament
Years	Term	Electorate	Party
1879	6th	Coleridge	Independent

George Hart (1820 – 19 August 1895) was a 19th-century Member of Parliament in the Canterbury region of New Zealand.

Hart was born in Winchmore Hill in 1820. He was baptised on 10 February 1823 in St. Clement Dunes, London. He came to New Zealand with his elder brother Robert in 1843 on the Mary, and he settled in Wellington. He returned to England for a visit in 1848, and upon his return, he settled in Canterbury and took up a large sheep run.

He returned to the Wellington region in 1853, and he represented the Hutt electorate on the Wellington Provincial Council from August 1853 until February 1861. He was the council's third speaker from September 1859 until February 1861. He unsuccessfully contested the 1856 Hutt by-election, losing against William Fitzherbert and Samuel Revans. He unsuccessfully contested the 1872 by-election in the Coleridge electorate, and was beaten by William Bluett.

He married Julia Frances Herison James in 1859, who was from Sydney. Some time after his marriage, he again moved to Canterbury. He once more held large sheep stations and in 1874, he sold the Fernside station with 40,000 sheep.

He was appointed to the executive council of the Canterbury Provincial Council by Francis Edward Stewart in June 1867 and served until the end of Stewart's executive on 3 March 1868.

He represented the Coleridge electorate in 1879, from 8 May to 15 August when he was defeated by Edward George Wright.

He died at his residence in Hereford Street in Christchurch on 19 August 1895. He is buried at Linwood Cemetery.

== Notes ==
New Zealand Parliament
Preceded by Cathcart Wason	Member of Parliament for Coleridge; 1879	Succeeded by Edward George Wright
