= Glentanner (ship) =

Scottish immigrant ship

History
- Name: Originally Glentanar, later Glentanner
- Owner: Yule and Co
- Builder: A Hall & Co, Aberdeen
- Yard number: 123
- Launched: 1842
- Fate: Lost 1861

General characteristics
- Tons burthen: 610 tons
- Length: 130 ft (40 m)
- Beam: 26 ft (7.9 m)
- Draught: 19 ft (5.8 m)
- Sail plan: 3 masts

Glentanner was an immigrant ship which made two voyages to New Zealand (in 1857 and 1861) as well as many voyages to Australia in the 1840s and 1850s. She was a clipper ship of 610 tons, built in Aberdeen, Scotland, in 1842 and originally named Glentanar, that sailed from Gravesend, England, to Lyttelton, Christchurch, New Zealand, carrying immigrants for the Canterbury Provincial Government.

The first journey departed on 11 June 1857 from Gravesend and arrived in Lyttelton on 3 October 1857 with about 194 passengers on board. Joseph Colborne-Veel and his wife were among the passengers. The ship was nearly lost when she was thrown on her beam ends during a squall. The second journey departed 24 February 1861 from Gravesend and arrived in Lyttelton on 8 June 1861 with about 24 cabin passengers.

Other journeys included loads of immigrants bound for Australia, and Chinese passengers for British Guiana.

The ship came to an end after leaving the Port of Lyttelton in 1861 on the return trip to the United Kingdom.
