= 1882 Wakanui by-election =

New Zealand by-election

The 1882 Wakanui by-election was a by-election held on 16 June 1882 in the Wakanui electorate during the 8th New Zealand Parliament.

The by-election was caused when the election of the incumbent MP Cathcart Wason in 1881 was declared void.

The by-election was won by Joseph Ivess. He was opposed by Alfred Saunders.

== Results ==
The following table gives the election result:

1882 Wakanui by-election
Party	Candidate	Votes	%	±%
Independent	Joseph Ivess	605	52.79	
Independent	Alfred Saunders	541	47.21	
Majority		64	5.58	
Turnout		1146		
