= Mary Colborne-Veel =

Mary Caroline Colborne-Veel (1861 – 22 February 1923) was a New Zealand poet.

Colborne-Veel was born in Christchurch, and was the daughter of Joseph Colborne-Veel. She worked as a journalist for the Christchurch Press, and was a regular contributor to the New Zealand School Journal. She published a volume of poetry, The fairest of the angels, and other verse, in 1894. She was a social reformer, and served as an official visitor to Te Oranga Home for Delinquent Girls at Burnham, and to women patients at Sunnyside Hospital. In 1913, along with fellow poets Jessie Mackay and Blanche Baughan, she founded the Canterbury Women's Club.

Colborne-Veel died in Sumner in 1923. Following her death her poetry was collected in a posthumous collection by Jessie Mackay.

== Works ==
- The fairest of the angels, and other verse (1894)
- A little anthology of Mary Colborne-Veel (1924) (edited by Jessie Mackay)
