= Yanworth =

Village in Gloucestershire, England

Coordinates: 51°49′N 1°53′W

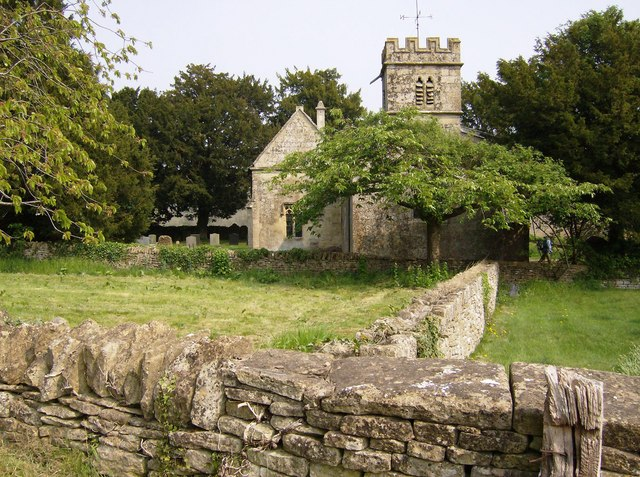
- St Michael's Church, Yanworth

- Location within Gloucestershire
- Population: 112 (2011 Census)
- OS grid reference: SP0713
- Civil parish: Yanworth
- District: Cotswold
- Shire county: Gloucestershire
- Region: South West
- Country: England
- Sovereign state: United Kingdom
- Post town: Cheltenham
- Postcode district: GL54
- Police: Gloucestershire
- Fire: Gloucestershire
- Ambulance: South Western
- UK Parliament: North Cotswolds

Yanworth is a village and civil parish in the Cotswold district, in the county of Gloucestershire, England 14 miles south east of Cheltenham and 88 miles North West of London. It has a population of 300, decreasing to 112 at the 2011 census. The village itself is part of the Stowell Park estate owned by Lord (Sam) Vestey. St Michael's church is set apart from the village and dates to about 1200.

== Name ==
In the Domesday book, the village is recorded as Ieneurde and by 1162, Ianeorþe in 1162, meaning either 'lamb enclosure' or 'Geana's enclosure' (orþe or worþ meaning 'enclosure').
