= William Bluett =

New Zealand politician

New Zealand Parliament
Years	Term	Electorate	Party
1872–1875	5th	Coleridge	Independent

William James Geffrard Bluett (1834–23 November 1885) was a 19th-century Member of Parliament in the Canterbury region of New Zealand.

He represented the Coleridge electorate from 1872 to 1875, when he was defeated.

New Zealand Parliament
Preceded by John Karslake Karslake	Member of Parliament for Coleridge; 1872–1875	Succeeded by Cathcart Wason
