= New Zealand Press Association =

New Zealand news agency (1879–2011)

- Formation: 1879
- Dissolved: 2011
- Headquarters: Wellington
- Website: nzpa.co.nz

The New Zealand Press Association (NZPA) was a news agency that existed from 1879 to 2011 and provided national and international news to the media of New Zealand. The largest news agency in the country, it was founded as the United Press Association in 1879, and became the New Zealand Press Association in 1942. Following Fairfax New Zealand's withdrawal from NZPA in April 2011, NZPA told staff that it would be wound up over the next four to six months, and ceased operation on 31 August 2011.

NZPA was superseded by three new services, all Australian-owned: APNZ (on-going), Fairfax New Zealand News (on-going as Stuff), and NZ Newswire (folded in April 2018).

== History ==
Daily and Sunday newspapers owned by APN News & Media, Fairfax New Zealand, Allied Press, Ashburton Guardian, The Gisborne Herald, The Wairoa Star Ltd, Whakatane Beacon and the Westport News were members of NZPA. Until January 2006, member newspapers were obliged by contract to supply their home town news copy to NZPA. Sub-editing was done at NZPA's Wellington headquarters and the copy then redistributed to all members. NZPA's own journalists also contributed to the national news wire, which by 2005 consisted of approximately 50 per cent each of copy contributed by the member newspapers and the other half by NZPA's own staff.

In 2005 NZPA announced that the 125-year-old news-sharing model would cease in January 2006, leaving NZPA responsible for news gathering and production of the national wire. This resulted in NZPA owning outright the intellectual property to the national news wire which it was then free to sell to all other media on a commercial basis. At the same time NZPA established news services other than the text-based newswire, including photo-news and graphics services as well as providing news, features and other information in page ready format.

The NZPA newsroom (based in Wellington) sent out approximately 1000 different pieces of information every 24 hours, compiled from the resources of its employees, overseas wire services and other sources such as the NZ Stock Exchange. The NZPA employed approximately 40 journalists, based in Sydney (2 staff), Auckland (4 staff), Parliament of New Zealand (5 staff) and at the head office in Wellington. From January 2006 staff concentrated on news gathering, where they previously focused on sub-editing. As well as full-time staff, there were national networks of both correspondents and photographers. NZPA operated business, national and a sports desk which also covered racing and employed a rural reporter.

NZPA managed external newsfeeds from Reuters, Australian Associated Press and Associated Press and sub-edited the items for a New Zealand audience before distributing them on to member newspapers. NZPA also provided these services with reciprocal rights to its content for sale overseas though practically little content was directly used.

NZPA operated a content sales division providing NZPA authored content on a commercial basis to corporate and government clients. It also operated a media release distribution service circulating media releases to media on behalf of clients domestically and also across the world through Asianet, a consortium of press agencies. The closure of NZPA came when Fairfax pulled out of the media co-operative. Fairfax's decision was released on 6 April 2011 and talks with staff about shutting down NZPA started immediately after Fairfax's announcement.

== Succession ==
It was superseded by three new services, all Australian-owned. APNZ was formed by APN News & Media and started service on 1 September 2011. APNZ creates content for over 50 newspapers and their websites, and largely works with all the APN newspapers, the Otago Daily Times and independent publications. Fairfax New Zealand News (FNZN) services Fairfax New Zealand print media outlets. Australian Associated Press (AAP) started NZ Newswire (NZN) on 5 September 2011, but closed it on 27 April 2018.
