= John Karslake Karslake =

New Zealand politician

John Karslake Karslake (died 21 June 1872) was a 19th-century Member of Parliament in the Canterbury region of New Zealand.

== Private life ==
Karslake arrived in Lyttelton on the Gananoque on 9 May 1860. The ship had sailed from London. In 1861, Karslake was living in the Cheviot district.

In about 1863, Karslake and Thomas Anson bought the Waireka run in the Malvern district. The business partners bought Run 210 in February 1868, and about 1870 the two bought the adjacent Run 277. The combined run became known as the Torlesse Station, named after nearby Mount Torlesse, inland from Springfield.

He was the brother or nephew of John Burgess Karslake.

== Member of Parliament ==
New Zealand Parliament
Years	Term	Electorate	Party
1871–72	5th	Coleridge	Independent

In the 1871 general election, Karslake and George Hart contested the Coleridge electorate. Both men had no prior political experience. Karslake and Hart received 35 and 27 votes, respectively. Karslake was thus returned. He resigned on 12 April 1872 to return to England.

== Death ==
Karslake died on the voyage home on 21 June 1872 by drowning.

New Zealand Parliament
Preceded by John Cracroft Wilson	Member of Parliament for Coleridge; 1871–72	Succeeded by William Bluett
