= Cathcart Wason =

New Zealand and UK politician (1848–1921)

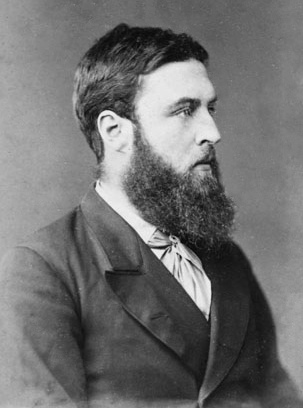
- Wason, ca 1878

Member of the New Zealand Parliament for Coleridge
- In office 6 January 1876 – 14 April 1879
- Majority: 7

Member of the New Zealand Parliament for Wakanui
- In office 9 December 1881 – 22 February 1892

Member of the New Zealand Parliament for Selwyn
- In office 4 December 1896 – 15 November 1899
- Majority: 162

Member of Parliament for Orkney and Shetland
- In office 1900 – 19 April 1921

Personal details
- Born: 17 November 1848 Girvan, Scotland
- Died: 19 April 1921 (aged 72) London, England
- Spouse: Alice Seymour Bell
- Relations: Rigby Wason (father); Eugene Wason (brother); Peter Cathcart Wason (grand-nephew); John William Crombie (nephew-by-marriage)
- Children: nil

John Cathcart Wason (17 November 1848 – 19 April 1921), generally known as Cathcart Wason, was a Scottish farmer and politician who served as a Member of Parliament in two countries: first in New Zealand and then in Scotland. He established Barrhill, a model village, and after the failure of this colonial venture, he returned to Scotland. An unusually large man (he was more than 6 feet 6 inches (1.98 m) tall), he is noted both as an innovative farmer and for having passed his time in the British House of Commons by knitting.

== Early life ==
Born in Colmonell near Girvan, South Ayrshire, Scotland, Cathcart Wason was the son of Rigby Wason and his wife Euphemia McTier. Rigby Wason was a barrister and a successful farmer who converted much of his Corwar estate from moor to arable land; he had also served as a Member of Parliament. He was educated at Laleham and at Rugby School. He came to Canterbury in New Zealand in 1868.

Cathcart Wason had four siblings; three older brothers (Rigby, Eugene and James) and one younger sister (Catherine Rigby). Peter Cathcart Wason was Eugene's grandchild.

== New Zealand ==
=== Corwar and Barrhill ===
Location of Rakaia in New Zealand

Lendon was a 20,000 acres (8,100 ha) run on the south bank of the Rakaia River on New Zealand's South Island, about 17 km from the town of Rakaia. The land was first taken up by John Hall, but had changed ownership several times before Wason bought it, including 1,250 acres (510 ha) of freehold land, in February 1869 or April 1870 (sources vary). Wason renamed his property Corwar after his father's lands in Scotland, and set about trying to create a model estate.

His planting of pine trees and of oaks, walnuts and poplars extended over 600 acres (240 ha) and allowed shelter from the prevailing north-west winds to allow sheep farming and the growing of wheat, while water power was used for agricultural machinery. He bought and sold land, and by 1882 Corwar was consolidated as a freehold estate of just over 5,000 acres (2,000 ha) with a large mansion overlooking the river, complete with gate lodge and gate-keeper.

On the estate, Wason built a model village called Barrhill, approached from the north, east, south and west by avenues lined respectively with sycamores, birches, poplars and oaks. At the centre was a market square, with post office, bakery and other facilities and 15 cottages were built.

However, Wason had expected a railway to be built near Barrhill, but when it was built on a more southerly route, the village began to decline. Dwindling population forced the closure of the school in 1938, although the Church of St John the Evangelist is still in use. Most of the buildings were constructed from pine wood grown on the estate, and all that remains now are the three concrete buildings: church, school and schoolhouse, each surrounded by a circle of oak trees.

Without the railway, Wason saw his project as doomed, and sold up in 1900. The mansion was burned down soon after and all that remains is the gate lodge, now the home of the Corwar Lodge Museum, displaying artefacts of the colonial era.

=== New Zealand political career ===
New Zealand Parliament
Years	Term	Electorate	Party
1876–1879	6th	Coleridge	Independent
1881–1882	8th	Wakanui	Independent
1896–1899	13th	Selwyn	Independent

Wason was elected to the House of Representatives in the 1876 election on 11 January for the electorate (constituency) of Coleridge, and was appointed as a government whip the following year. On 14 April 1879, he resigned his seat in Parliament, as well as his membership on the Ashburton County Council.

Wason stood for election in the newly formed Wakanui electorate in the 1881 general election. The 9 December election was contested by Wason, Joseph Ivess and Charles Purnell. Wason won by a small margin, and Ivess petitioned against the election on numerous grounds. The election petitions court started hearing the case in February 1882. Members were sworn into the 8th New Zealand Parliament on 18 May 1882 for its first session; Wason was not present. On the following day, the results of the various election petitions were read out, and the 1881 Wakanui election was declared void. Wason lost his seat in Parliament without having ever taken it. The resulting 16 June 1882 by-election was won by Ivess. In the 1884 election, Wason was narrowly defeated by William Walker in the Ashburton electorate.

Wason did not stand again until the 1893 general election, when he ran unsuccessfully in the Ashburton electorate. He was elected as MP for Selwyn in the 1896 election on 21 December. That parliamentary term finished on 15 November 1899 and that is when Wason retired from politics in New Zealand.

Politics ran in the Wason family. His father Rigby was an MP for Ipswich (1831–37) before Cathcart was born, and his brother Eugene represented two UK constituencies (South Ayrshire and Clackmannanshire and Kinross-shire) at various times between 1885 and 1918.

== Travel ==
Wason travelled overseas on several occasions, marrying Alice Seymour Bell, in Sydney, Australia, on 18 June 1873. In 1886, he was elected a fellow of the Royal Geographical Society in London, and in 1887 he followed his father and brother and was called to the Bar at the Middle Temple, but did not practise.

== Return to Scotland ==
Cathcart Wason

Wason sold his New Zealand estate in 1900 and returned to Scotland, where he was elected as Liberal Unionist MP for Orkney and Shetland in the 1900 general election, and bought a house in London and a property in Ayrshire not far from the original Corwar. He resigned his seat on 7 October 1902 and successfully stood for re-election in the 1902 by-election as an Independent Liberal. He was re-elected as a member of the Liberal Party in the subsequent general elections in 1906, January 1910, December 1910 and 1918. He continued to sit as MP for Orkney and Shetland until his death.

His brother Eugene was chairman of the Scottish Liberal MPs from 1908 to 1918.

Cathcart Wason lived at Grosvenor Road when in London. He was a member of the Viking Club. He died in London on 19 April 1921 aged 72, survived by his wife. He is believed to have had no children.

== Publications ==
- Wason, John Cathcart (1905). East Africa and Uganda: or, Our Last Land. preface by Sir Harry Johnston, G.C.M.G. London: Francis Griffiths.
- Wason, John Cathcart (1915). The Kaiser's Responsibility. Address given at the Congregational Church, West Hampstead, on May 2nd, 1915. London: P. S. King & Son.; later re-published in revised form as "The Beast".

== Notes ==
New Zealand Parliament
Preceded by William Bluett	Member of Parliament for Coleridge; 1876–1879	Succeeded by George Hart
New constituency	Member of Parliament for Wakanui; 1881–1882	Succeeded by Joseph Ivess
Preceded by Alfred Saunders	Member of Parliament for Selwyn; 1896–1899	Succeeded by Charles Hardy
Parliament of the United Kingdom
Preceded by Sir Leonard Lyell	Member of Parliament for Orkney and Shetland; 1900–1921	Succeeded by Sir Malcolm Smith
