= Coleridge (electorate) =

Coleridge is a former parliamentary electorate in the Canterbury region of New Zealand. The electorate existed from the 1866 election to 1887.

== Population centres ==
This electorate is in the rural part of the Canterbury Region. In the 1871 election, polling stations were in the Bealey settlement near Arthur's Pass and Ashburton, and one of the election meetings was held at Hororata. The electorate is named after Lake Coleridge.

== History ==
The electorate was established for the 1866 general election, when the 4th Parliament was determined. John Cracroft Wilson was its first elected representative. He was elected unopposed.

In the 1871 general election, John Karslake Karslake and George Hart contested the electorate. Both men had no prior political experience. Karslake and Hart received 35 and 27 votes, respectively. Karslake was thus returned. He resigned in 1872 to return to England.

The resulting 1872 by-election was contested by George Hart, William Bluett and John Jebson on 22 July 1872. Hart, Bluett and Jebson received 99, 106 and 48 votes, respectively, with Bluett thus being elected. He served until the end of the term in 1875.

The 6 January 1876 election was contested by four people; the incumbent Bluett, Cathcart Wason, William Tosswill, and John Jebson, who received 71, 167, 160 and 53 votes, respectively. Wason was thus elected, but he resigned his seat in Parliament in April 1879. George Hart was returned unopposed in the subsequent by-election on 8 May 1879.

=== Members of Parliament ===
The electorate was represented by seven Members of Parliament:

Key

Independent

Election	Winner
1866 election	John Cracroft Wilson
1871 election	John Karslake Karslake
1872 by-election	William Bluett
1876 election	Cathcart Wason
1879 by-election	George Hart
1879 election	Edward George Wright
1881 election	David McMillan
1884 election	David McMillan

== Election results ==
=== 1879 election ===
1879 general election: Coleridge
Party	Candidate	Votes	%	±%
Independent	Edward George Wright	487	56.30	
Independent	George Hart	378	43.70	
Majority		109	12.60	+11.05
Turnout		865	66.69	+0.61
Registered electors		1,297		

=== 1876 election ===
1876 general election: Coleridge
Party	Candidate	Votes	%	±%
Independent	Cathcart Wason	167	37.03	
Independent	William Browning Tosswill	160	35.48	
Independent	William Bluett	71	15.74	
Independent	John Jebson	53	11.75	
Majority		7	1.55	
Turnout		452	66.08	
Registered electors		684		

=== 1872 by-election ===
1872 Coleridge by-election
Party	Candidate	Votes	%	±%
Independent	William Bluett	106	41.90	
Independent	George Hart	99	39.13	
Independent	John Jebson	48	18.97	
Turnout		253		
Majority		7	2.77	
