= Edward George Wright =

New Zealand politician (1831–1902)

Edward George Wright (14 June 1831 – 12 August 1902) was an independent conservative Member of Parliament in New Zealand.

== Biography ==
New Zealand Parliament
Years	Term	Electorate	Party
1879–1881	7th	Coleridge	Independent
1881–1884	8th	Ashburton	Independent
1890–1893	11th	Ashburton	Independent
1896–1899	13th	Ashburton	Independent

Wright was born in Woolwich, Kent, England, in 1831. After an education in private schools, he worked for Fox, Henderson and Co. He was the engineer for the gasworks in Rome and then worked on the naval dockyards at Royal Arsenal in Woolwich and then Aldershot. He married in September 1854 at London and went to New Zealand with his wife and their first two sons in 1857, with another one born in their chosen country.

In Canterbury, he was responsible for many of the engineering works, especially bridges.

He represented the Coleridge electorate from 1879 to 1881, then the Ashburton electorate from 1881 to 16 May 1884, when he resigned. At this stage of his career he was a Greyite, supporting Sir George Grey. He unsuccessfully contested the 1885 by-election for Wakanui. In the 1887 election, he contested the Avon electorate, but was defeated by Edwin Blake.

He was successful again in the 1890 election in the Ashburton electorate. In the 1893 election, he was defeated in the Rangitata electorate. He was once again successful in the 1896 election in the Ashburton electorate. He retired at the end of the parliamentary term in 1899.

Wright was chairman of the Lyttelton Harbour Board for four periods.

Wright died at his homestead Windermere, after which a locality between Hinds and Winslow is named, on 12 August 1902. He was survived by his wife and five children. He was buried at Windermere Church.

New Zealand Parliament
Preceded by George Hart	Member of Parliament for Coleridge; 1879–1881	Succeeded by David McMillan
New constituency	Member of Parliament for Ashburton; 1881–1884 1890–1893 1896–1899	Succeeded by William Walker
Preceded by William Walker	Member of Parliament for Ashburton; 1881–1884 1890–1893 1896–1899	Succeeded by John McLachlan
Preceded by John McLachlan	Member of Parliament for Ashburton; 1881–1884 1890–1893 1896–1899	Succeeded by John McLachlan
Political offices
Preceded by John Thomas Peacock	Chairman of the Lyttelton Harbour Board; 1885–1886 1896–1898 1900–1901 1902	Succeeded by John Thomas Peacock
Preceded by John Joyce	Chairman of the Lyttelton Harbour Board; 1885–1886 1896–1898 1900–1901 1902	Succeeded by Frank Graham
Preceded by Isaac Gibbs	Chairman of the Lyttelton Harbour Board; 1885–1886 1896–1898 1900–1901 1902	Succeeded by Frederick Waymouth
Preceded by Frederick Waymouth	Chairman of the Lyttelton Harbour Board; 1885–1886 1896–1898 1900–1901 1902	Succeeded by Albert Kaye
