= John Grigg (New Zealand politician) =

New Zealand politician

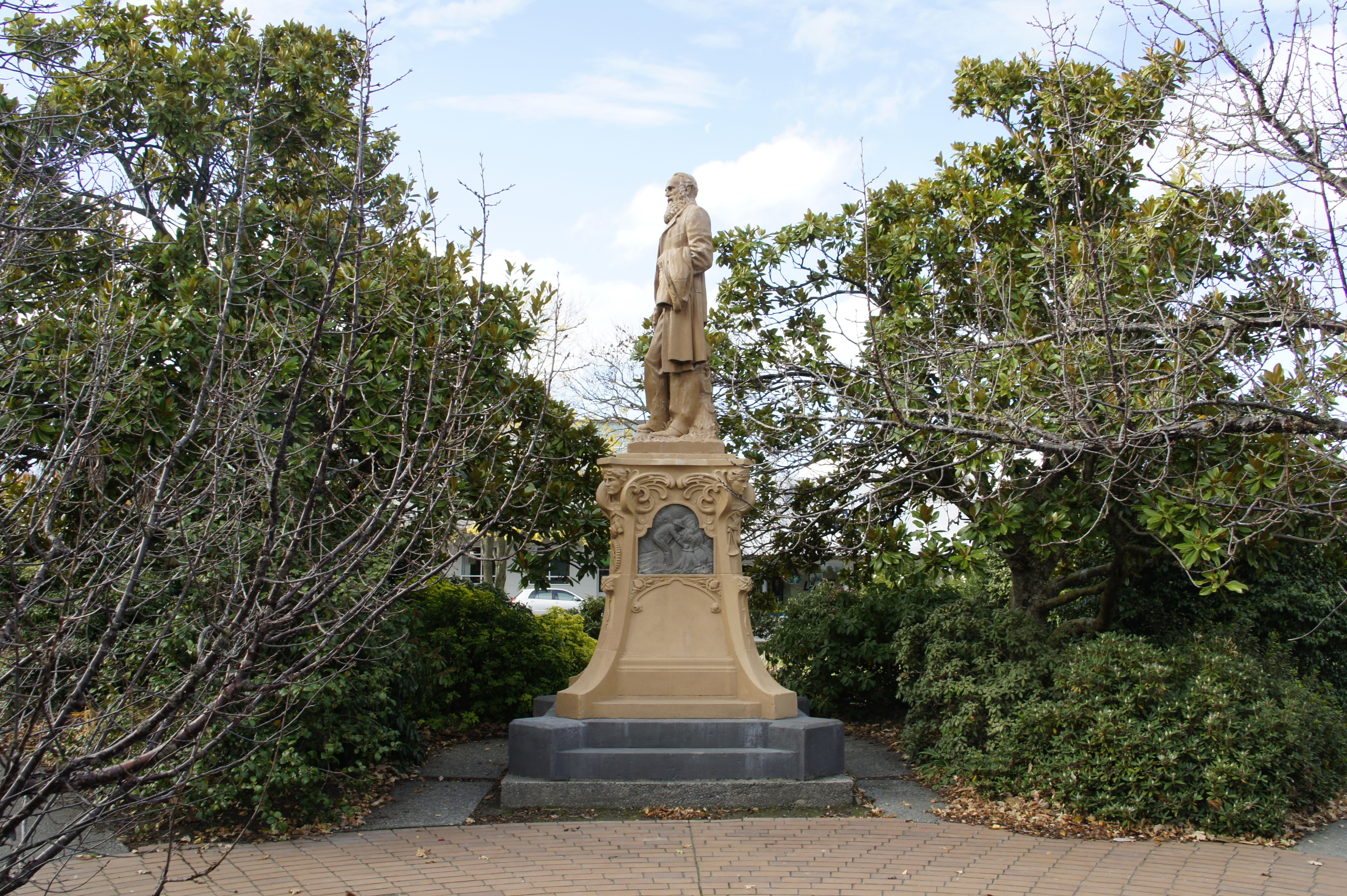
John Grigg Statue in Baring Square, Ashburton

New Zealand Parliament
Years	Term	Electorate	Party
1884–1885	9th	Wakanui	Independent

John Grigg (21 April 1828 – 5 November 1901) was a 19th-century Member of Parliament in Canterbury, New Zealand.

Grigg was born in Bodbrane, Cornwall, England, on 21 April 1828 and baptised in the nearby Duloe two days later.

He briefly represented the Wakanui electorate from 23 July 1884 to 4 June 1885, when he resigned.
