= Charles Purnell =

New Zealand writer

Charles William Purnell
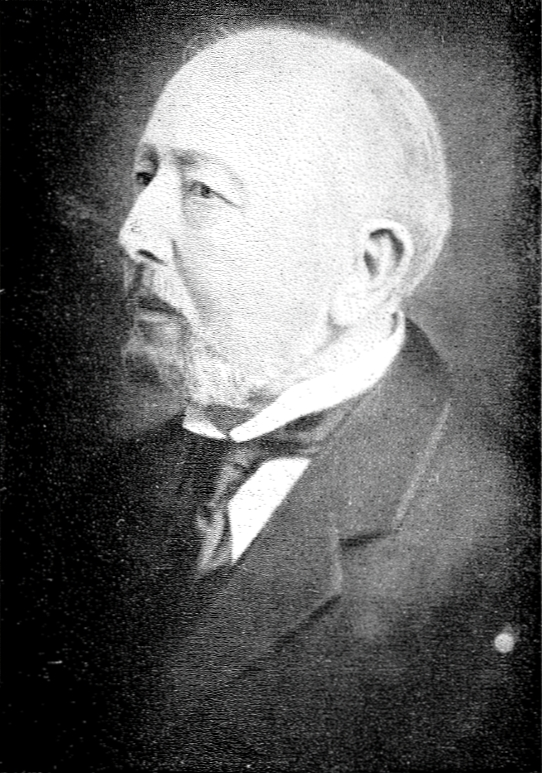
- Portrait of Charles Purnell (year unknown)
- Born: 1843; Lambeth, London, England
- Died: 7 December 1926 (aged 82–83); Ashburton, New Zealand
- Occupations: journalist, lawyer, publisher, poet
- Known for: publication of political and scientific texts

Charles William Purnell (1843 – 7 December 1926) was a New Zealand soldier, journalist, lawyer, and publisher of political and scientific texts.

== Early life and career ==
Purnell was born in Lambeth, London, England, where he received his education at private schools. He emigrated with his parents and five siblings to Taranaki, where they arrived on 19 May 1856 on the Chatham. In Taranaki, Purnell joined the militia. He is also said to have fought in the American Civil War for the Confederate States Army.

Purnell was apprenticed to the Taranaki Herald as a printer, and then went into journalism. He was on the staff of The Wellington Independent, and edited The Evening Post and the Wanganui Chronicle. Then in March 1868, he became editor of The Press in Christchurch after the previous editor, Joseph Colborne-Veel, left during a time a deep economic depression to be sub-editor of the Westland Observer. In an attempt to save the paper from financial ruin, its publication was changed from daily to three times a week a month later. Purnell was editor for eight months and during that time, the ownership structure was changed. With new capital injected, daily publication resumed in December 1868 and the price was dropped from three pence to one penny. Purnell moved on, and Colborne-Veel was attracted back as the newspaper's editor. In The Press centenary publication, Purnell is described as "a man of restless temperament".

Purnell changed from journalism to law in January 1878, when he was admitted to the bar in Dunedin by Justice Williams. He went to Ashburton, where he practised until his death. He was an agent for Chapman and Tripp based in Wellington. Purnell became one of the first captains of the Ashburton Guards.

In May 1878, he addressed the Otago branch of the New Zealand Institute with one of the earliest proposals for Antarctic exploration. He advocated for a joint expedition with Australia, but exploration did not start until the 1890s:

The physical characteristics of New Zealand have virtually shut its settlers out from the field of geographical exploration, so far as the country itself is concerned; but, on the other hand, it is the most convenient base for operations in the noble area of research which lies open for our enterprise in the South Polar Seas. No real obstacle stands in the way.

== Political ambitions ==
He was one of three candidates in the Wakanui electorate in the 1881 election, where he came last. He challenged the incumbent, William Campbell Walker, in the Ashburton electorate in the 1887 election, but was beaten by a substantial margin. He was one of four candidates in the Ashburton electorate in the 1893 election, where he came last.

== Family and death ==
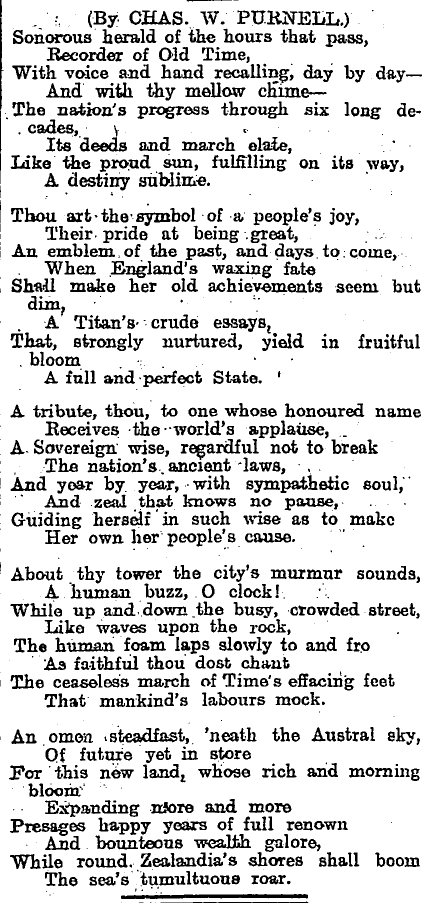
Poem by Purnell about the Jubilee Clock Tower in Christchurch, published in The Star on 27 May 1899

Purnell's parents remained in New Plymouth until their deaths. His father, Charles Purnell, had early in his life worked for David Napier before becoming self-employed, supervising the construction of boats for the Crimean War. In Taranaki, Charles Purnell Sr worked for Harry Atkinson. His mother, Sarah Ann Purnell (née Clegg) died on 28 June 1866 from bronchitis at the age of 52. His father died two years later on 3 May 1868 aged 67. Both are buried at Te Henui Cemetery in New Plymouth, in Block A, Row 12 No 177. A third family member, Ada Purnell, who died on 14 September 1960 aged 72, shares the family grave.

Charles Purnell Jr was the eldest child. The next born was James "Jim" Purnell (9 May 1844 – 15 January 1926), who became a major after the New Zealand Wars. He was a champion rifle shot in New Zealand, and was town clerk in Wanganui before retiring to Freemans Bay, Auckland, where he lived in Wood Street.

The next oldest brother was George Purnell (20 July 1846 – 20 July 1931), who, like James Purnell, lived in Wanganui. His son, George Proctor Purnell, set up a law firm in Christchurch in 1919 that still exists as Purnell Creighton Lawyers.

The next brother was Alfred Henry Purnell (February 1849 – 13 June 1908), who moved to Thames in 1874 for mining. He died at his home in Mary Street in Thames after a long illness.

His eldest sister was Sarah Ann Purnell (21 April 1852 – 8 August 1932), who married Charles Frederick Andrews at Thames on 16 October 1875. She retired to Grey Lynn, where she lived in Sussex Street not too far away from her brother James.

The youngest sister who made the journey from England to New Zealand was Jessie Eleanor Purnell (1855 – 23 May 1928). She married James Graham on 16 April 1887 at her brother James' house in Wanganui, in which town the couple lived until their deaths. She was prominent in the Methodist Church.

One more sister, Mary Caroline "Lucy" Purnell (13 January 1858 – 23 October 1945), was born after the family had arrived in New Zealand. She married Robert Pitkethley and they lived in Manly, Sydney.

On 2 June 1870, Purnell married Flavia Marie Hyde, the daughter of Herbert Wilson of Jersey, at St John the Baptist Church, Christchurch. Their eldest daughter married in November 1904. His wife died in 1924. Purnell died in Ashburton on 7 December 1926 after a very brief illness; he worked as a barrister up until his death.

== Bibliography ==
Purnell published books on political and scientific topics, and he wrote poetry. His publications include:

- Purnell, Charles (1874) An Agrarian Law for New Zealand : Addressed to the Young Men of the Colony
- Purnell, Charles (1876). Our Land Laws: what Should be their Basis?. Dunedin: Evening Star office.
- Purnell, Charles (1877). The New Zealand Confederation : An Enquiry into the Present State of Political Affairs, with Suggestions as to the Best Form of Government for the Colony. Dunedin: R. T. Wheeler.
- Purnell, Charles (1878) An Agrarian Law
- Purnell, Charles (1880) The Moa and the Maori
- Purnell, Charles (1893) The Intelligence of Animals
- Purnell, Charles (1912) The Modern Arthur and Other Poems
- Purnell, Charles (1922) The Serpent and Other Poems

== Notes ==
Business positions
Preceded by Joseph Colborne-Veel	Editor of The Press; 1868	Succeeded by Joseph Colborne-Veel
