= Mayor of Ashburton =

Head of a municipal government in New Zealand

- Coat of arms of Ashburton District Council
- Incumbent; Liz McMillan since 2025
- Style: His/Her Worship
- Term length: Three years
- Inaugural holder: Thomas Bullock
- Formation: 1888
- Deputy: Liz McMillan
- Salary: $132,690
- Website: Official website

The mayor of Ashburton is the elected head of local government in the Ashburton District of New Zealand's South Island; one of 67 mayors in the country. The mayor is based in the principal town (and namesake) of the district, Ashburton. The mayor presides over the Ashburton District Council and is directly elected using the first-past-the-post method.

From 1878 until the 1989 local government reforms, the area was administered by a borough council. Liz McMillan is the current mayor of Ashburton; she was first elected in the 2025 local elections.

== History ==
The Ashburton Borough Council was inaugurated in 1878. The first mayor was Thomas Bullock, who was elected on 2 September 1878. Nine borough councillors were elected on 5 September and the first council meeting was held on 9 September. Hugo Friedlander was the second mayor when he resigned in July 1892 as he had urgent business in England to attend to. Henry Davis was declared elected unopposed for 12 years in a row. The first time he had an opponent, in April 1915, he was defeated.

Methven farmer Angus McKay was mayor for two terms from the 2010 local elections to 2016. Donna Favel was the mayor of Ashburton between 2016 and 2019. Since 2019, the current mayor has been Neil Brown; he was sworn in on 24 October.

== List of mayors of Ashburton ==
	Photo	Name	Term
Ashburton Borough Council 1878–1989
1		Thomas Bullock	2 September 1878 – 17 December 1879
2		Hugo Friedlander	17 December 1879 – 21 December 1881
3		Donald Williamson	21 December 1881 – November 1884
4		Rudolph Friedlander	November 1884 – November 1886
5		Thomas Sealy	November 1886 – November 1887
6		Alfred Harrison	November 1887 – November 1888
7		David Thomas	November 1888 – 17 December 1890
(2)		Hugo Friedlander (2nd term)	17 December 1890 – July 1892
8		Richard Bird	28 July 1892 – November 1893
9		John Orr	November 1893 – November 1894
10		Joseph Sealy	November 1894 – November 1897
11		Charles Reid	November 1897 – 21 December 1898
(2)		Hugo Friedlander (3rd term)	21 December 1898 – 8 May 1901
12		William Henry Collins	8 May 1901 – April 1903
13		Henry Davis	April 1903 – April 1915
14		Robert Galbraith	5 May 1915 – 31 December 1930
15		Robert Kerr	12 January – 18 May 1931
16		William Woods	18 May 1931 – 18 May 1938
17		Dr. George Inglis Miller †	18 May 1938 – 7 November 1940
18		Dr. John Connor	13 November 1940 – 1 June 1944
19		Ernest Cook Bathurst	1 June 1944 – 1956
20		Archibald A. McDonald	1956–1959
21		John Davidson	1959–1968
22		George Glassey	1968–1971
23		Darcy O. Digby	1971–1977
24		Geoff Geering	1977–1989
Ashburton District Council 1989–present
(24)		Geoff Geering continued	1989–1995
25		Murray Anderson	1995–2004
26		Bede O'Malley	2004–2010
27		Angus McKay	2010–2016
28		Donna Favel	2016–2019
29		Neil Brown	2019–2025
30		Liz McMillan	2025–present
† died in office
