= 1884 Selwyn by-election =

New Zealand by-election

- 15 February 1884
- Turnout: 795
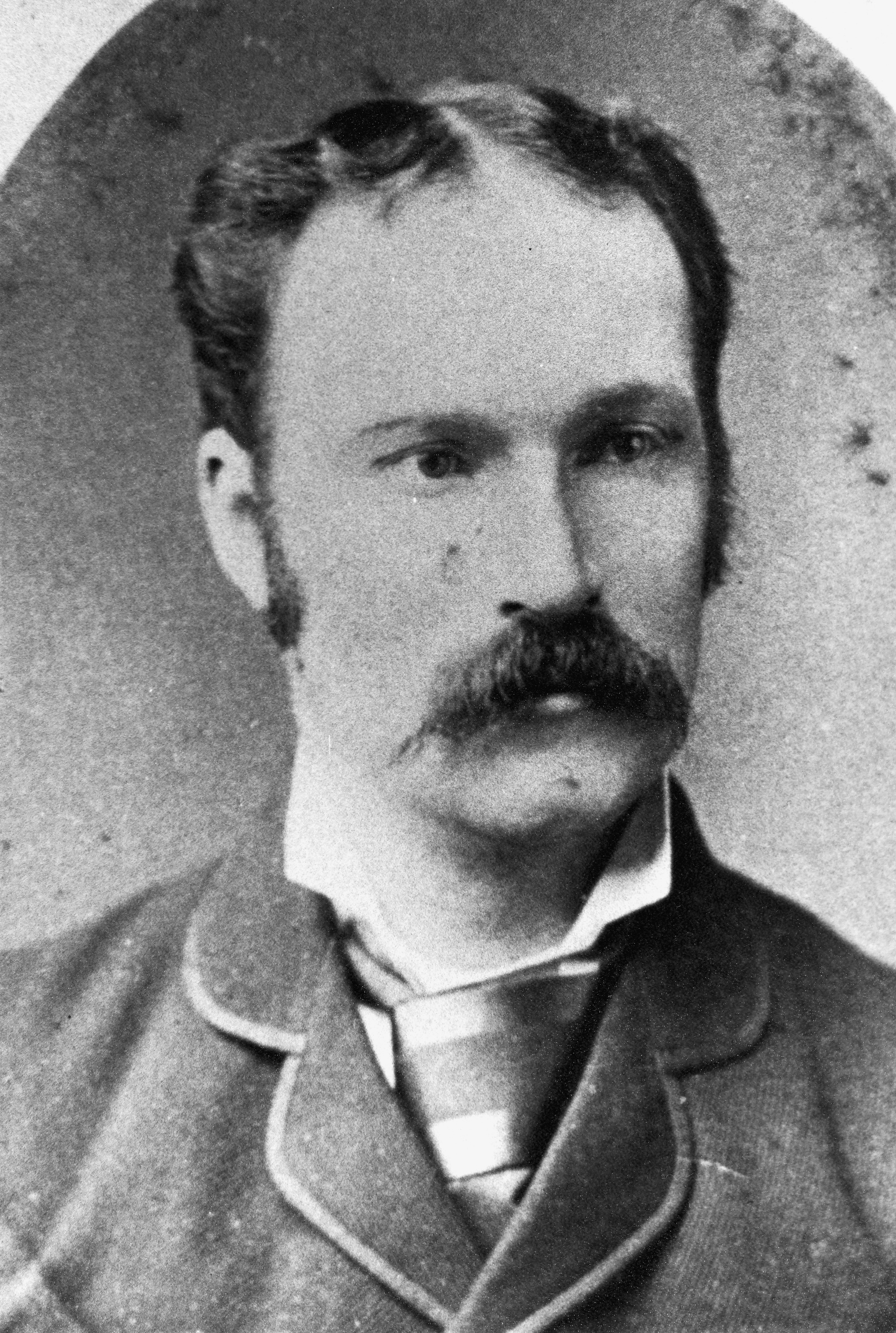

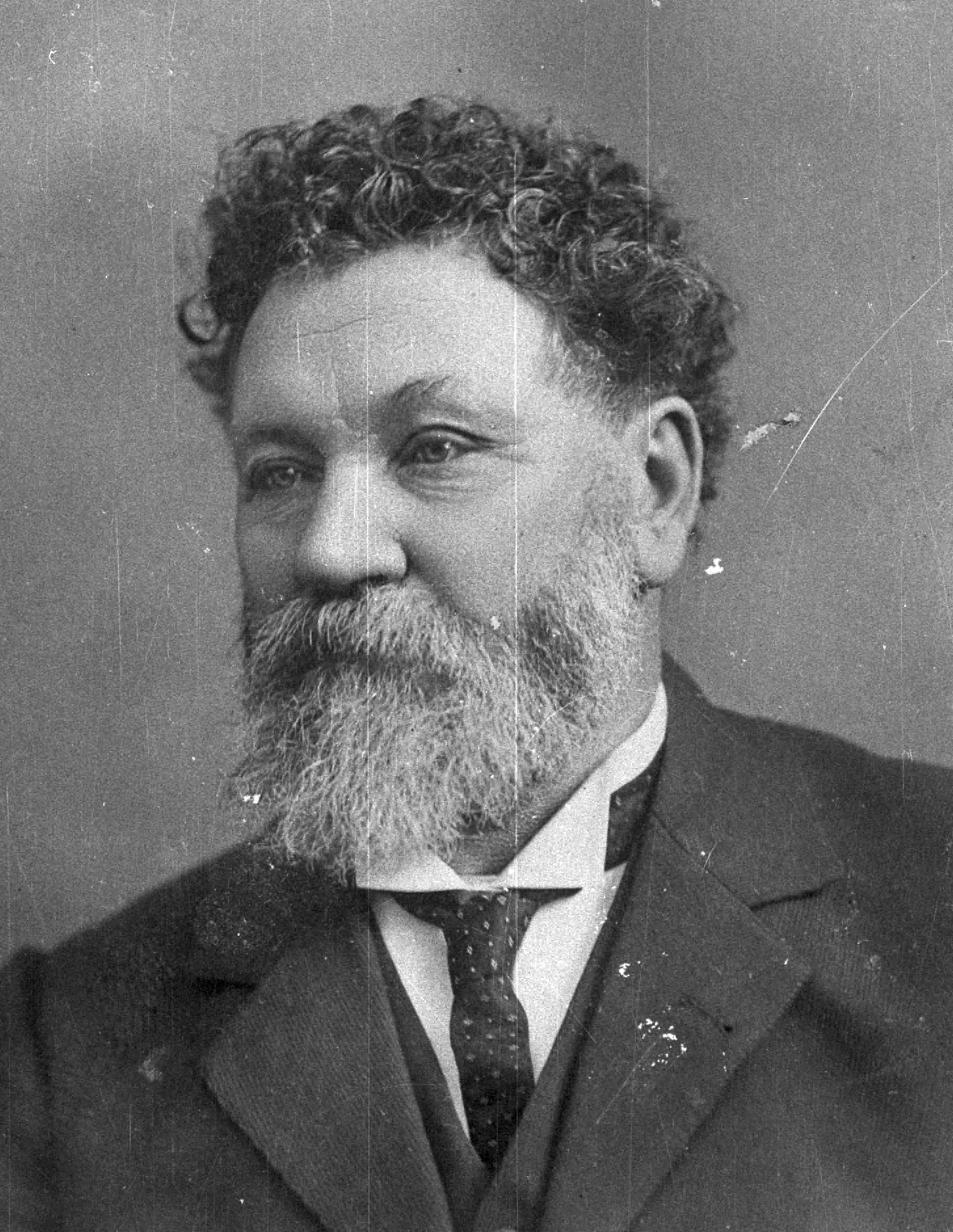
| Candidate | Edward Wakefield | John McLachlan |
| Party | Independent | Independent |
| Popular vote | 479 | 316 |
| Percentage | 60.25% | 39.75% |
MP before election
Edward Lee
Independent
Elected MP
Edward Wakefield
Independent

The Selwyn by-election of 1884 was a by-election held on 15 February 1884 during the 8th New Zealand Parliament in the rural Canterbury electorate of Selwyn.

The by-election was caused by the death, on 18 December 1883, of the previous member of parliament Edward Lee, who had won the previous by-election in April 1883.

The by-election was contested by John McLachlan and Edward Wakefield, the latter winning the show of hands at the nomination meeting. The election was won by Wakefield, with 479 votes to 316.

== Results ==
The following table gives the election results:

1884 Selwyn by-election
| Party | Candidate | Votes | % | ±% |
|---|---|---|---|---|
| Independent | Edward Wakefield | 479 | 60.25 | |
| Independent | John McLachlan | 316 | 39.75 | |
| Majority | | 163 | 20.50 | |
| Turnout | | 795 | | +177 |

McLachland won the polling booth at Leeston by one vote, but Wakefield won the other booths at Brookside, Southbridge and Dunsandel. At the 1884 general election on 22 July, Wakefield was returned unopposed in Selwyn.
