= Southbridge =

Southbridge or South Bridge may refer to:

== Locations ==
New Zealand

- Southbridge, New Zealand
  - Southbridge Branch, New Zealand, a railway line
  - Southbridge District High School
  - Southbridge Primary School

United Kingdom

- South Bridge, Edinburgh

United States

- Southbridge, Massachusetts
  - Southbridge Municipal Airport
- Southbridge, Virginia
- Southbridge Towers, Manhattan, New York
- John Harris Bridge, Harrisburg, Pennsylvania, known locally as "South Bridge"
- Gateway Bridge (Illinois–Iowa), Clinton, Iowa, also known as “South Bridge”

== Other uses ==
- Southbridge (computing), a chip that implements the "slower" capabilities of the motherboard
