= Dan Carter =

New Zealand international rugby union player

Dan Carter ONZM
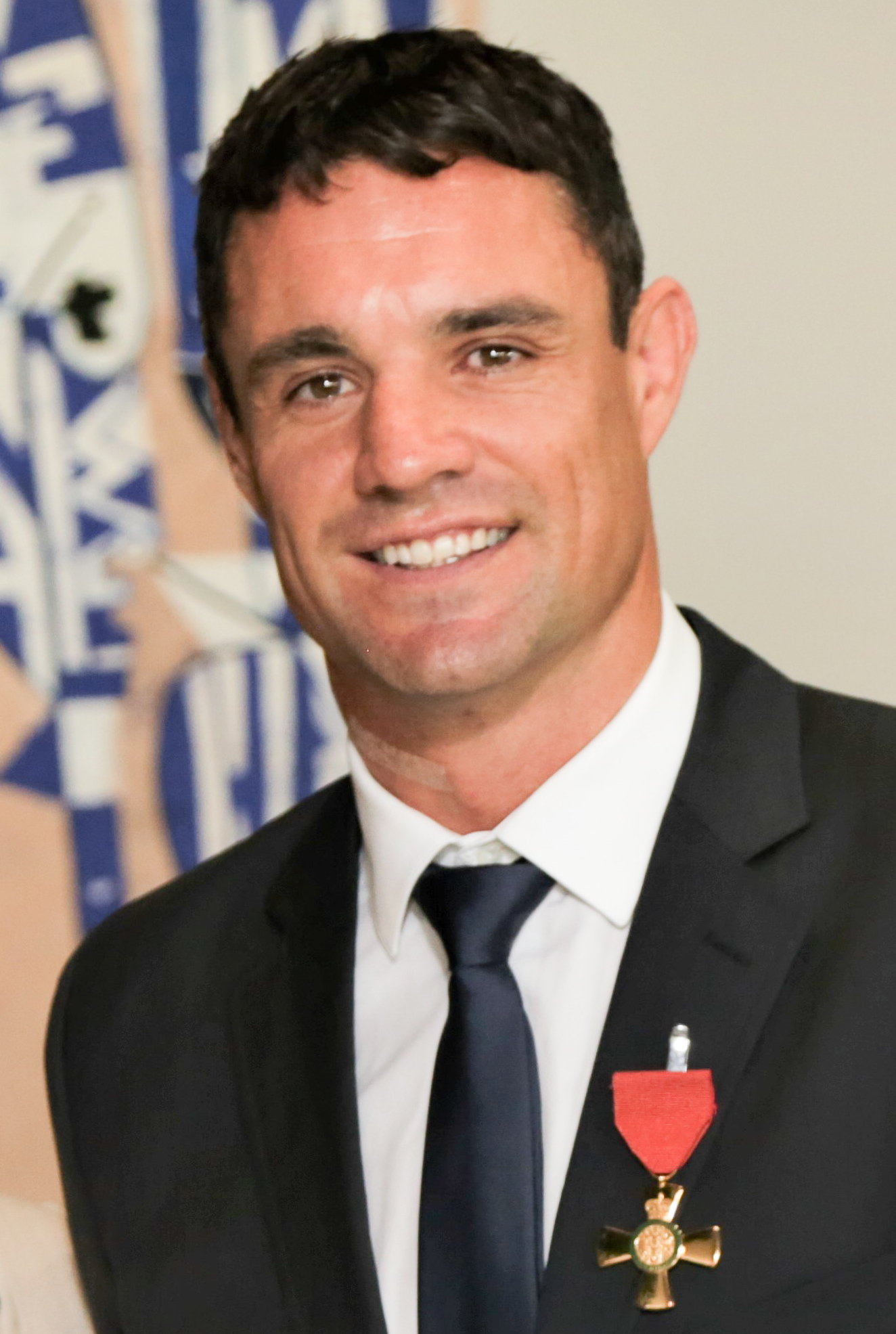
- Carter in 2019
- Born: Daniel William Carter; 5 March 1982 (age 44) Leeston, New Zealand
- Height: 178 cm (5 ft 10 in)
- Weight: 94 kg (207 lb; 14 st 11 lb)
- School: Ellesmere College
- Notable relative: Bill Dalley (great uncle)

Rugby union career
- Position(s): Fly-half; Centre
Senior career
Years	Team	Apps	(Points)
2002–2014	Canterbury	28	(300)
2003–2015	Crusaders	141	(1,708)
2008–2009	Perpignan	5	(45)
2015–2018	Racing 92	57	(445)
2018–2020	Kobelco Steelers	13	(229)
- Correct as of 4 June 2020
International career
Years	Team	Apps	(Points)
2002	New Zealand U21	5	(68)
2003–2015	New Zealand	112	(1,598)
- Correct as of 4 June 2020

Daniel William Carter ONZM (born 5 March 1982) is a New Zealand retired rugby union player. Carter played for the Crusaders in Super Rugby and for New Zealand's national team, the All Blacks. He is the highest point scorer in test match rugby, and is considered by many experts as the greatest ever first five-eighth (fly-half) in the history of the game. He was named the International Rugby Board Player of the Year in 2005, 2012 and 2015.

Carter played for the All Blacks in their Rugby World Cup winning teams in both 2011 and 2015, becoming one of 43 players to have won multiple Rugby World Cups. In 2011, he was due to captain against the Canadians, shortly before he suffered a groin injury during the pool stage; in 2015, he played during the entire tournament, including in the final against Australia, where he kicked four penalties, two conversions, and a drop goal, and was named the man of the match. He also won three Super Rugby titles with the Crusaders, and nine Tri-Nations and Rugby Championships with New Zealand.

== Early life ==
Carter was born in a small town 10 minutes drive from the Carter family home in Southbridge in the South Island of New Zealand, to Neville and Bev Carter and has one older sister, Sarah. From the age of 5, he played with Southbridge Rugby Club as a half back (scrum half) and would go on to make representative teams for Ellesmere & Canterbury Country. He attended Ellesmere College where he played mostly at first five-eighth, and then in his final year he transferred to Christchurch Boys' High School to further his chances of succeeding in rugby. Some have said he was a shy and quiet young man who kept grand aspirations to himself. His great uncle was Canterbury and New Zealand half back Bill Dalley, a member of the 1924–25 Invincibles and later a Canterbury rugby administrator.

== Domestic career ==
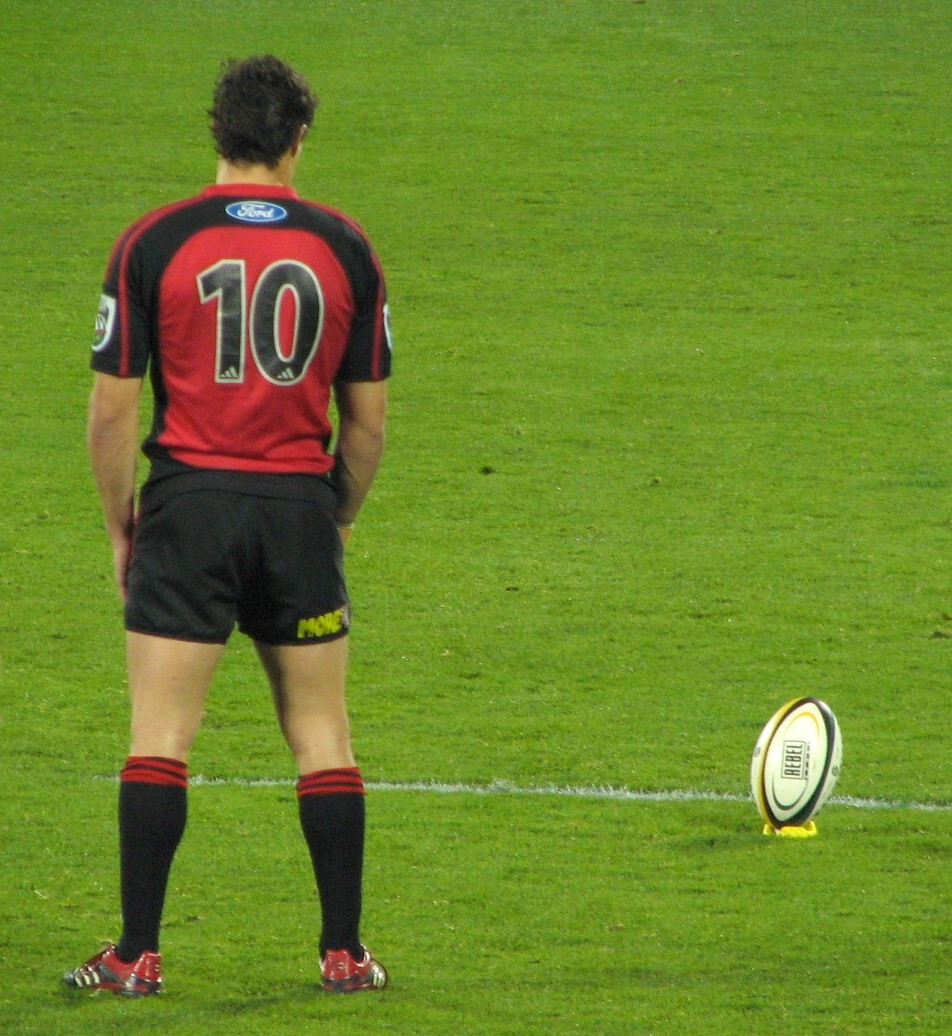
Carter kicking at goal for the Crusaders

Carter made his provincial debut for Canterbury in 2002, and in 2003 was signed by the Super Rugby side the Crusaders. Initially playing mainly at second five-eighth Carter reached the final of the Super 12 competition with the Crusaders in 2003, 2004, 2005 and 2006. Although they lost the 2003 and 2004 finals, in 2005 Carter had moved to first five-eighth. He regularly played with first-five eighth Andrew Mehrtens before Mehrtens left the team following their 2004 season. In 2005 and 2006 the Crusaders won the competition, and in the 2006 season Carter scored the most individual points for a player in one season with 221.

In April 2008, Carter was linked with several European clubs. In June 2008, Carter made the decision to sign a six-month contract with French club side Perpignan, who then paid Carter the equivalent of £30,000 per game, during his sabbatical season. On 31 January 2009 Carter ruptured his Achilles tendon playing for Perpignan against Stade Francais, but Perpignan still managed to win the Top 14 despite Carter being injured for the remainder of the season.

He recovered in time to play for his home provincial union, Canterbury, in the opening game of the 2009 Air New Zealand Cup. He then won selection to play for the All Blacks against Australia on 22 August 2009 after a few months of recovery. In May 2012, Carter was the top scorer in Super Rugby history, with 1301 points.

In December 2014 it was announced Carter would be joining Parisian club Racing Metro after the 2015 Rugby World Cup, on a three-year deal worth a reported €1,500,000 a season, making him the world's highest paid rugby player. In November 2015 Carter revealed that, while recovering from an Achilles tendon tear in 2013, he met with Robert Kraft, the owner of the New England Patriots of the National Football League about possibly joining the team as a kicker. On 24 June 2016, Carter helped Racing Metro win the 2016 Top 14 final with a 29–21 win against Toulon at Camp Nou, Barcelona scoring 15 points (5 penalties) and was named Man of the Match despite being down to 14 men 18 minutes into the game after teammate Maxime Machenaud got sent off for a dangerous tackle on Australian international Matt Giteau.

On 25 November 2017, Carter left Racing 92 in France at the end of the season.

On 16 July 2018, Carter joined Kobelco Steelers, a club in the Japanese Top League.

On 17 February 2019, it was announced that Dan Carter was returning to Racing 92 as injury cover after Patrick Lambie was forced to retire due to concussions.

On 4 June 2020, it was announced that Dan Carter was joining The Blues for Super Rugby Aotearoa. However he never made a professional appearance for the side.

On 20 February 2021, Dan Carter announced that he was retiring from professional rugby via his Instagram.

== International career ==
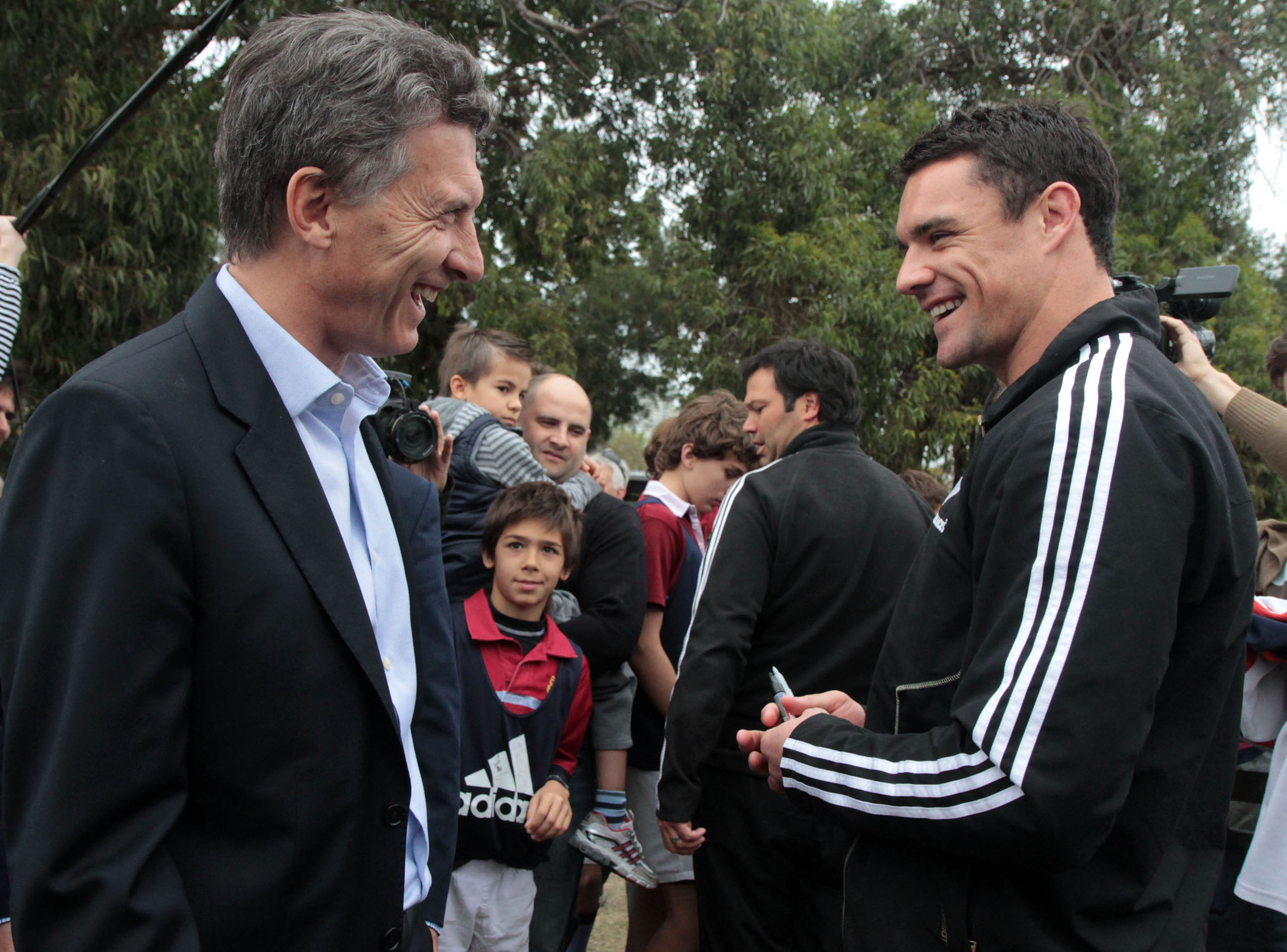
Carter with President Mauricio Macri in Argentina at a welcome for the All Blacks during the Rugby Championship.

In June 2003, Carter made his All Blacks debut at age 21 in Hamilton, New Zealand, scoring 20 points against Wales. He was then capped against France in Christchurch, which the All Blacks won 31–23. He was also a substitute in a match against Australia (the Wallabies) in Sydney, which the All Blacks won 50–21. Carter was then included in New Zealand's 2003 Rugby World Cup squad, where he first gained serious international attention. Carter spent much of the later stages of the tournament on the bench leaving New Zealand without a specialist goal-kicker. However, he did play in the games against Italy in Melbourne, which the All Blacks won 70–7, and the wins over Canada and Tonga. Although he has been an All Black since 2003 he only secured a permanent position as the first five-eighth in the team during the 2004 tour to the United Kingdom and France displacing Carlos Spencer. He had been playing as a second five-eighths up until the end of the 2004 Tri-Nations.

In 2005, Carter starred in the All Blacks 48–18 win over the British & Irish Lions. He scored two tries, five penalties, and four conversions. He ended the match with 33 points, passing the previous All Blacks record of 18 points in a Lions Test (Carter's second-half total of 22 points by itself was sufficient to top this). The performance was later described by The Guardian as "the definitive fly-half display of the modern era".

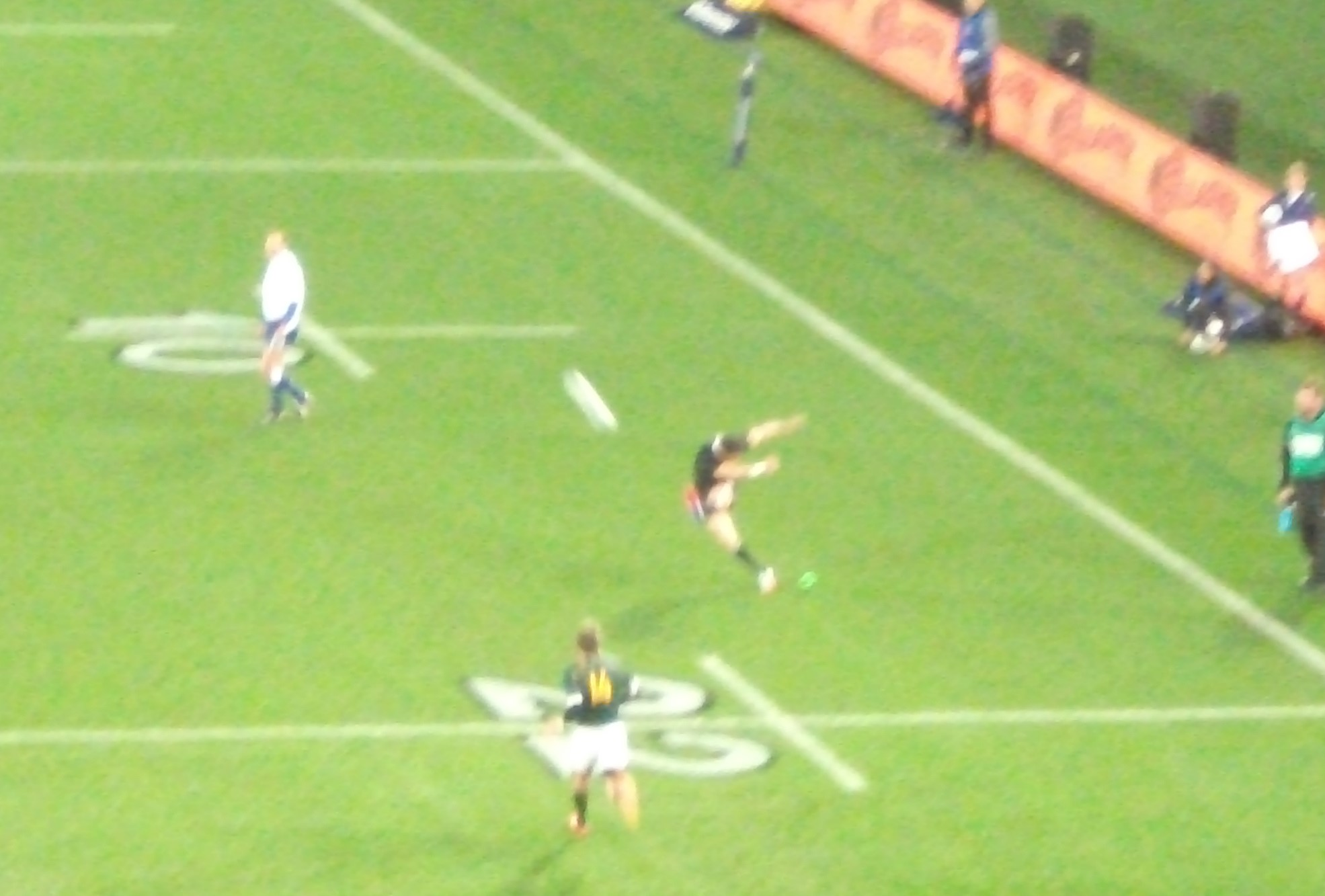
Dan Carter attempting a conversion during the All Blacks V Springboks game at Eden Park in 2013

Carter was named IRB Player of the Year in 2005, becoming the first New Zealander to win the award.

On 27 November 2010, after scoring a halfway penalty against Wales, Carter became the highest point scorer of all time, overtaking England's Jonny Wilkinson's previous record of 1,178 although Wilkinson took the record back on 26 February 2011 against France. Carter reclaimed the record on 30 July 2011 when he advanced to 1,204 points in the first tri-nations match of the 2011 series against South Africa. He has currently scored a total of 1,598 test points (29 tries, 293 conversions, 281 penalties, and 8 drop goals) in 112 tests, with an average of 14.27 points a game (the highest average for players who have scored more than 500 Test points). Along with Richie McCaw Carter earns 750,000 NZD a year being the joint highest paid player in New Zealand. This high paying contract by the New Zealand Rugby Union is not subject to form or fitness as both players are regarded as integral to the All Blacks 2011 Rugby World Cup plans. It was announced on 1 October that Carter would captain the All Blacks for the first time against Canada. However, it was later announced that Carter would miss the rest of the 2011 Rugby World Cup after tearing a groin tendon during the final training session before the match against Canada. Carter has signed a contract to re-sign with the NZRU until 2015.

Carter was named IRB Player of the Year in 2012, but eyebrows were raised when he missed out being named in the shortlist for New Zealand Player of the Year. On 16 November 2013, Carter became the fifth All Black to play 100 caps when New Zealand defeated England by 30–22 at Twickenham on their end of year tour.

On 17 July 2015, Carter and Richie McCaw played their final match in Christchurch together, after Carter took a deal to play for Racing Metro in France. On 15 August 2015 Carter played his final test in New Zealand in the Bledisloe Cup decider at Eden Park, a trophy he has never lost since his debut. He later appeared with McCaw in a Men In Black themed safety video for Air New Zealand.

In the 2015 Rugby World Cup final against Australia, Carter scored four penalties, converted two tries (with the final one taken with his right boot), and kicked a drop goal that gave the All Blacks the winning moment. Due to the performance, he was named the Man of the Match. Following the All Blacks' victory, he received the IRB Player of the Year award for the third time.

== International record ==
Carter is the only player in international rugby union test history to have scored more than 1,500 test points. He scored a total of 1,598, ahead of 1,271 by Owen Farrell and 1,246 by Jonny Wilkinson. Carter also holds the record for average points per match (for players who have scored more than 500 points) of 14.27.

Carter holds the world record for the total number of conversions (293) and also total number of penalties (281) in rugby. He also holds the record for test points scored against England (178), France (163) and South Africa (255).

Carter holds the all-time record for most conversions in World Cup matches at 58.

Test record overall:

Opposition	Played	Won	Drawn	Lost	Winning %	Tries	Conversions	Penalties	Drop goals	Points total
Argentina	5	5	0	0	100	1	13	12	0	67
Australia	27	20	1	6	74.1	3	48	82	3	366
British & Irish Lions	2	2	0	0	100	2	5	8	0	44
Canada	2	2	0	0	100	3	16	0	0	47
England	11	10	0	1	90.9	4	28	34	0	178
Fiji	2	2	0	0	100	1	8	0	0	21
France	12	11	0	1	91.7	2	33	28	1	163
Ireland	6	6	0	0	100	0	18	16	1	87
Italy	3	3	0	0	100	2	20	1	0	53
Japan	1	1	0	0	100	0	5	0	0	10
Pacific Islanders	1	1	0	0	100	0	4	1	0	11
Samoa	2	2	0	0	100	0	7	6	0	32
Scotland	5	5	0	0	100	2	14	8	0	62
South Africa	19	15	0	4	78.9	3	33	55	3	255
United States	1	1	0	0	100	0	3	0	0	6
Tonga	2	2	0	0	100	1	3	1	0	14
Wales	9	9	0	0	100	5	25	29	0	162
Total	112	99	1	12	88.4	29	293	281	8	1598

Test tries:

Tries	Opposition	Location	Venue	Competition	Date	Result
1	Wales	Hamilton, New Zealand	Waikato Stadium	Test match	21 June 2003	Won
1	Australia	Sydney, Australia	Stadium Australia	Tri Nations	26 July 2003	Won
1	Italy	Melbourne, Australia	Docklands Stadium	Rugby World Cup	11 October 2003	Won
1	Tonga	Brisbane, Australia	Lang Park	Rugby World Cup	24 October 2003	Won
1	England	Auckland, New Zealand	Eden Park	Test match	19 June 2004	Won
1	Italy	Rome, Italy	Stadio Flaminio	Test match	13 November 2004	Won
1	France	Paris, France	Stade de France	Test match	27 November 2004	Won
1	Fiji	North Shore City, New Zealand	North Harbour Stadium	Test match	10 June 2005	Won
2	British & Irish Lions	Wellington, New Zealand	Westpac Stadium	Test match	2 July 2005	Won
2	Wales	Cardiff, Wales	Millennium Stadium	Test match	5 November 2005	Won
1	Argentina	Buenos Aires, Argentina	Ferrocaril Oeste	Test match	24 June 2006	Won
1	South Africa	Rustenburg, South Africa	Royal Bafokeng Stadium	Tri Nations	2 September 2006	Lost
1	England	London, England	Twickenham	Test match	5 November 2006	Won
1	France	Lyon, France	Stade de Gerland	Test match	11 November 2006	Won
3	Canada	Hamilton, New Zealand	Waikato Stadium	Test match	16 June 2007	Won
1	South Africa	Christchurch, New Zealand	Lancaster Park	Tri Nations	14 July 2007	Won
1	Scotland	Edinburgh, Scotland	Murrayfield	Test match	23 September 2007	Won
1	England	Auckland, New Zealand	Eden Park	Test match	14 June 2008	Won
1	England	Christchurch, New Zealand	Lancaster Park	Test match	21 June 2008	Won
1	South Africa	Cape Town, South Africa	Newlands Stadium	Tri Nations	16 August 2008	Won
1	Australia	Brisbane, Australia	Lang Park	Tri Nations	13 September 2008	Won
2	Wales	Dunedin, New Zealand	Carisbrook	Test match	19 June 2010	Won
1	Australia	Melbourne, Australia	Docklands Stadium	Tri Nations	31 July 2010	Won
1	Scotland	Edinburgh, Scotland	Murrayfield	Test match	13 November 2010	Won

== Personal life ==
Carter became engaged to his longtime girlfriend and former Black Sticks striker Honor Dillon in October 2010 when she was a marketing manager at DB Breweries. The couple married on 9 December 2011, and have gone on to have four children. Wedding guests included Richie McCaw and All Blacks former coach Graham Henry.

Carter has modelled for Jockey underwear on billboards worldwide since 2003. In 2009, Carter's future wife joined him in one campaign. In 2004 and 2005, Carter was voted sexiest New Zealand male in a survey, receiving 35.7% of the vote in 2005. In 2008, American Cable Channel E! judged Carter to be 11th on its list of the world's sexiest men, and in 2010 E! voted him the world's 3rd sexiest male athlete.

Carter has also been a spokesmodel for Daikin heat pumps, and from mid-2011, Philips electric shavers. Both Dan and Honor Carter have been spokespeople for Chemist Warehouse since 2020. They are also shareholders for Farradays, a luxury department store and bar in Parnell.

In February 2017, Carter was caught driving in Paris with a blood alcohol level nearly twice the legal limit. He was subsequently dropped by his sponsor, Land Rover.

In May 2018, Carter stated that he declined an offer to switch to National Football League (NFL) as a kicker for New England Patriots after the Rugby World Cup in 2015.

== Honours ==
=== Canterbury ===
- NPC/Air New Zealand Cup Champion, 2001, 2004, 2008, 2009 and 2010
- Ranfurly Shield holder

=== Crusaders ===
- Super Rugby Champion 2005, 2006 and 2008
- NZ Conference Winner, 2011
- Super Rugby Centurion

=== Perpignan ===
- Top 14 Champion 2009

=== Racing 92 ===
- Top 14 Champion 2016

=== Kobelco Steelers ===
- Top League Champion 2018

=== New Zealand ===
- Rugby World Cup champion, 2011 and 2015
- Tri Nations/The Rugby Championship champion, 2003, 2005, 2006, 2007, 2008, 2010, 2012, 2013 and 2014
- Bledisloe Cup 2003 - 2015
- British & Irish Lions series victory, 2005
- Home Nations Grand Slam Tour, 2005, 2008 and 2010
- All Black test centurion

=== Personal accolades ===
- Kelvin Tremain Memorial Trophy (NZ Player of the Year) 2004 and 2005
- Rebel Sport Super 14 Player of the Year 2004 and 2006
- IRB Player of the Year 2005, 2012 and 2015 (Nominee in 2006 and 2008)
- BBC Overseas Sports Personality of the Year 2015
- Officer of the New Zealand Order of Merit for services to rugby, 2016 New Year Honours.
- Laureus World Sports Award for Comeback of the Year 2016
- All Time Super Rugby Leading Points Scorer
- All Time International Rugby Leading Point Scorer
- World Rugby Hall of Fame Inductee - Number 162 (2023)

== See also ==
- List of male underwear models

Awards
Preceded by (Portugal) Cristiano Ronaldo	BBC Overseas Sports Personality of the Year; 2015	Succeeded by (United States) Simone Biles
