= Cath Brown (artist) =

Māori master weaver and arts educator (1933–2004)

Cath Brown QSM
- Born: Catherine Elizabeth Brown; 24 October 1933
- Died: 7 August 2004 (aged 70)
- Education: Dunedin Teachers College
- Known for: weaving, ceramics, teaching and netball coaching
- Parents: Arnold Henley Rewi Brown (father); Winifred Freeman (mother)
- Awards: Queen's Service Medal; 1995; Sir Kingi Ihaka Award; 2000

Catherine Elizabeth Brown QSM (24 October 1933 – 7 August 2004) was a New Zealand Māori tohunga raranga (master weaver), ceramicist, educator and netball coach. She affiliated to the Ngāi Tahu iwi. Brown played a pivotal role during her lifetime in educating New Zealanders about Māori arts as well as organising workshops, hui, conventions, and exhibitions on Māori arts, particularly Māori weaving. As well as educating and organising, Brown was an acknowledged master weaver and artist whose work was exhibited both nationally and internationally. Brown was awarded a Queen's Service Medal in 1995 as well as the Ngā Tohu ā Tā Kingi Ihaka award in 2000 in recognition of her contribution to Māori arts.

== Early life ==
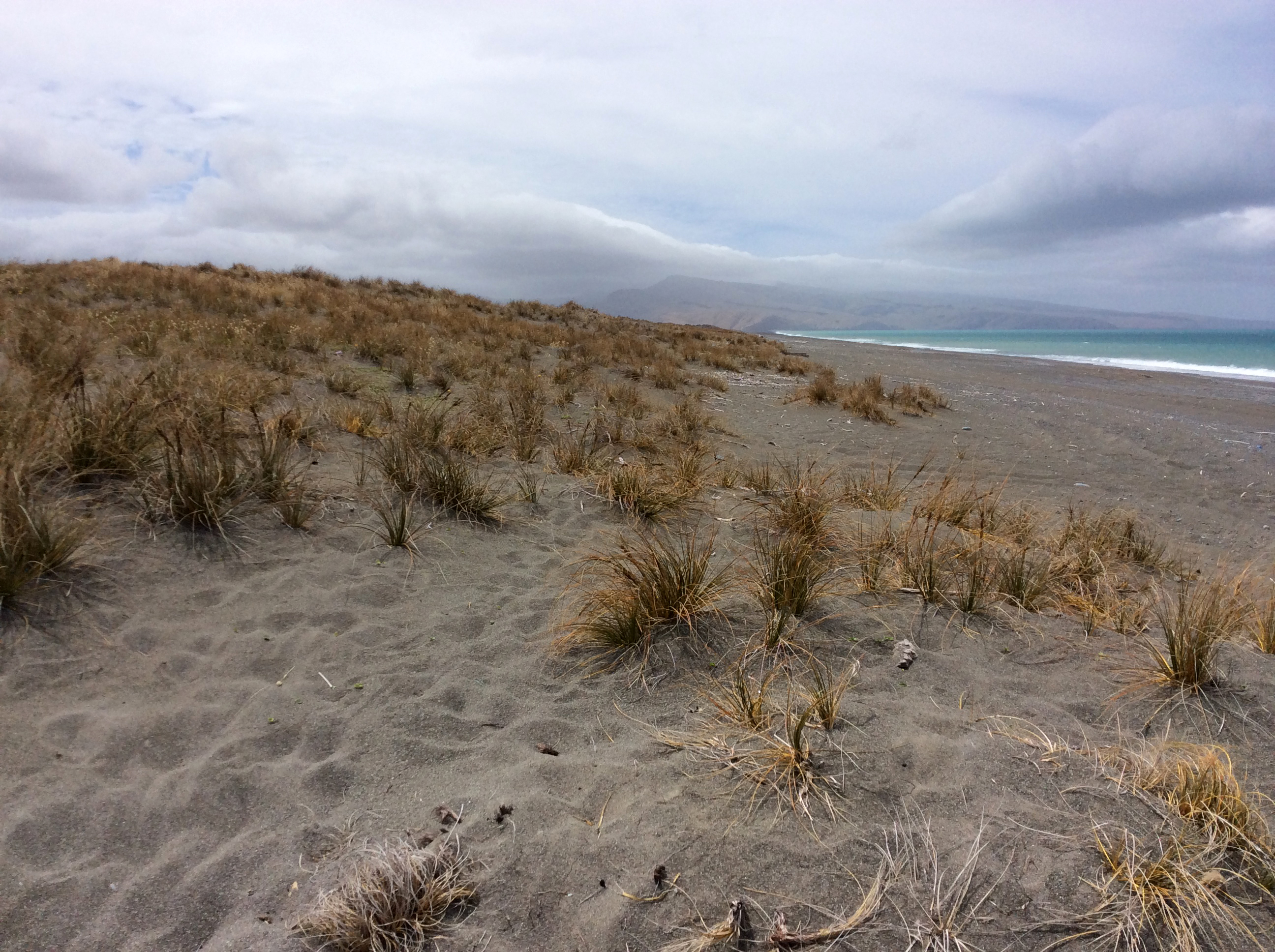
Kaitorete Spit showing the Pīngao plant, a well-known weaving material.

Brown was born to Winifred Freeman and Arnold Henley Rewi Brown on 24 October 1933 in Leeston. She was raised in the Ngāi Tahu settlement of Taumutu near Kaitorete Spit. Although there were weavers at her marae she didn't learn from them. It was her Pākehā mother who taught her basic weaving while Brown was young. She attended Sedgemere Primary School, Southbridge District High School, Christchurch Girls' High School and then Dunedin Teachers' College. She qualified with a Diploma in Teaching and specialised in art education. It was while at teachers college that she came under the influence of Arthur Gordon Tovey. Because of this association she became part of a group known as the 'Tovey generation'.

== Employment ==
In 1954, after completing her education, Brown returned to Christchurch having obtained a position with the Canterbury Education Board as an itinerant advisor to teachers. Brown advised them on how to deliver the arts curriculum to their students. While undertaking this work Brown, along with other art advisors, attended various courses to support and increase her knowledge in Māori arts. In 1960 she was taken, with other art advisors from around the country, to Ruatoria where they were all taught and influenced by Pine Taiapa. Brown then returned to Canterbury to pass on the knowledge she gained to primary and secondary school teachers. While teaching she was also learning as Brown, while travelled into local communities, encountered weavers who would be invited to participate in the weaving training being given to teachers.

Brown continued to work for the Canterbury Education Board for nearly 20 years. During that time she continued to regularly attended training courses in the North Island offered to the art and craft advisors, not just developing her own skills but also bringing that knowledge back to the teachers in her community. Brown specialised in passing on knowledge about weaving but also gained a background in teaching tukutuku and kowhaiwhai (Māori motifs and their meaning). Brown, along with other advisors, also worked with various Māori groups knowledgeable in Māori arts but who lacked teaching skills. In 1973 Brown was appointed as a lecturer in Art at the Christchurch College of Education. She was promoted to the Head of the Art Department in 1987 and retired in 1990.

== Influences ==
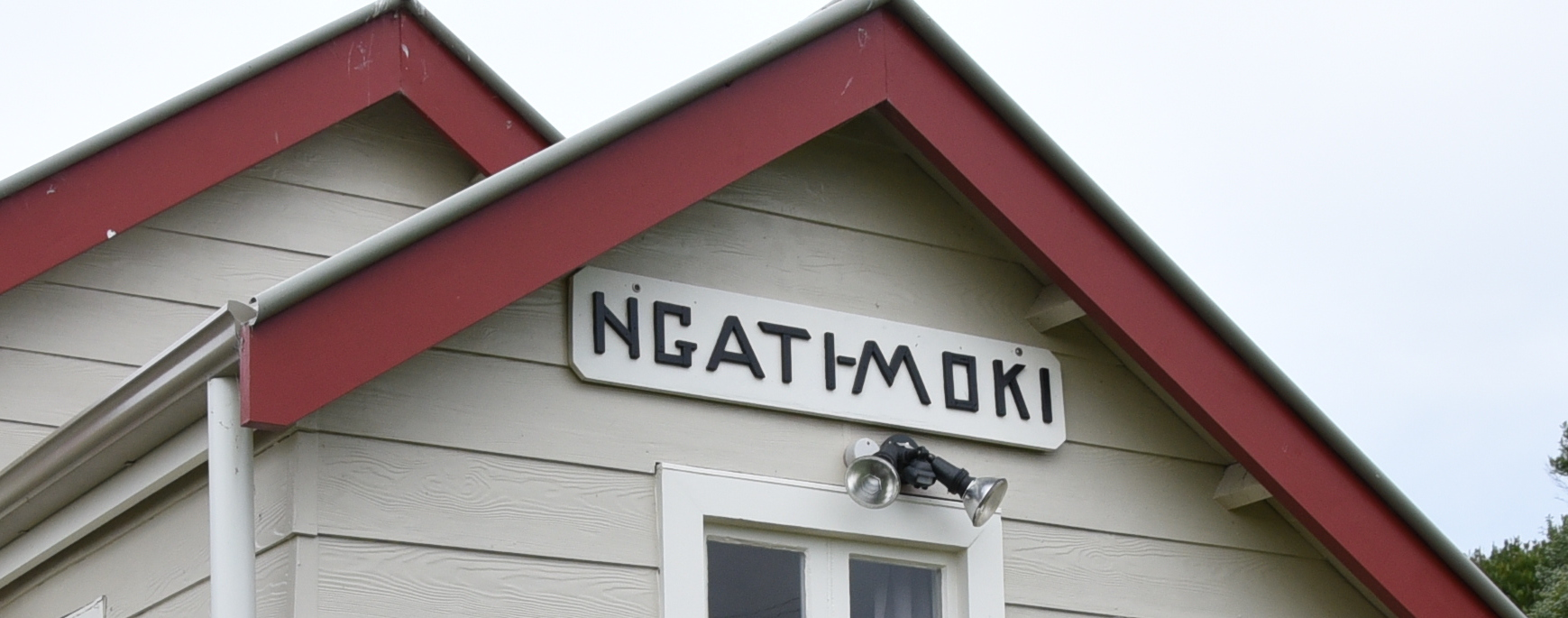
Ngāti Moki marae at Taumutu

Throughout her employment Brown would practice her art. While undertaking training courses as well as working with Māori groups as an itinerant art advisor, Brown learned from prestigious weavers from around the country including Raukura Erana Gillies, Marewa McConnell, Ngaropi White and Miriana Taylor. She lived most of her life in Southbridge, near the Taumutu marae Ngāti Moki. Brown dedicated time to the marae and was described as a kaumātua. Brown influenced the decoration of the new marae buildings with a mixture of traditional and modern elements.

Brown says of what she learnt in her life:

I know how lucky I am. The knowledge that I have had passed on to me is not mine. I am the kaitiaki (guardian) for it and have the responsibility to pass it on.

== Art ==
Brown is regarded as belonging to the Māori modernism movement. She was not only a master weaver but was also a ceramicist and combined those two disciplines to produce some of her works. Brown also illustrated several books and school journals. Pieces created by Brown are held in the University of Canterbury Art Collection. Part of her artistic work was leading teams of weavers to produce artwork for marae including her home marae Ngāti Moki.

== Netball ==
For many years Brown was the coach of the Canterbury region's netball team and coached Canterbury to 9 A-grade national titles up to 1983.

== Positions held ==
Brown was a founding member of Te Roopu Raranga Whatu o Aotearoa. Brown was the chairperson of her marae Ngati Moki at Taumutu as well as a member of the Ngāi Tahu tribal council (Te Runanga o Ngai Tahu). In 1987 Brown became a Justice of the Peace.

== Honours and awards ==
In 1995 Brown was awarded the Queen's Service Medal for Public Services. In 2000 she was awarded the Ngā Tohu ā Tā Kingi Ihaka (Sir Kingi Ihaka Award) in recognition of her lifetime contribution to Māori arts.

In 2005 after her death a community artwork was created by people who had been influenced by her each making a ceramic pātiki (flounder). This piece is named Moeka o te Pâtiki Mohoao (Sleeping Ground of the Flounder) and has over 100 individual pieces.

== Exhibitions ==
- 1966 Maori Culture and the Contemporary Scene Canterbury Art Gallery.
- 1986 Karanga Karanga Wellington City Art Gallery, the Fisher Gallery in Pakuranga, Auckland, and the Gisborne Museum.
- 1994 Aoraki/Hikurangi Canterbury Art Gallery.
- 2003 Te Puawai o Ngai Tahu Canterbury Art Gallery.
- 2004 Toi Māori: The Eternal Thread — Te Aho Mutunga Kore Pātaka Museum, and touring internationally for three years.
- 2020 Te Wheke Pathways Across Oceania Canterbury Art Gallery.
