= Edward Wakefield (New Zealand politician) =

New Zealand politician (1845–1924)

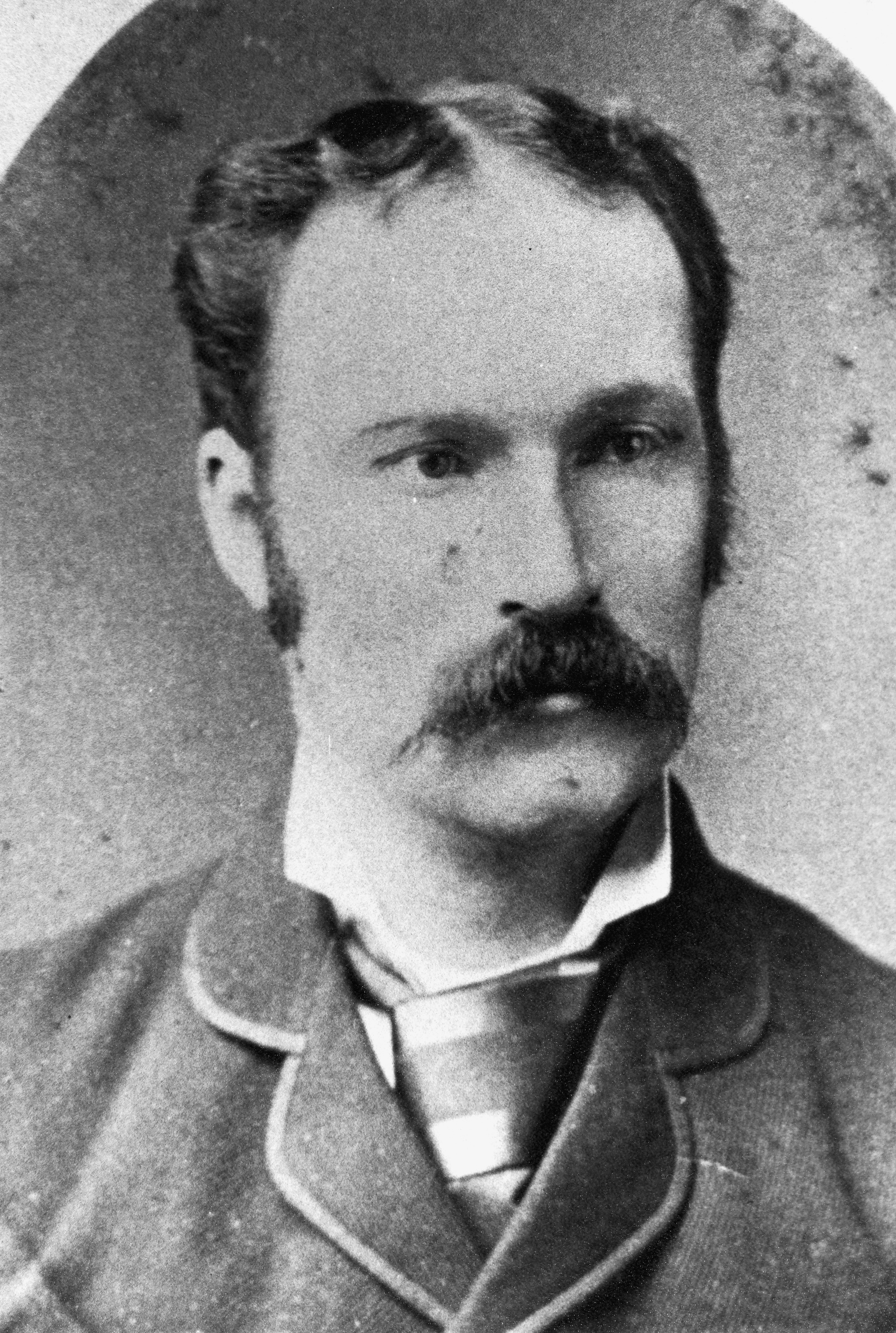
Wakefield, c. 1885

New Zealand Parliament
Years	Term	Electorate	Party
1875–1879	6th	Geraldine	Independent
1879–1881	7th	Geraldine	Independent
1884	8th	Selwyn	Independent
1884–1887	9th	Selwyn	Independent

Felix Edward Wakefield (22 May 1845 – 10 August 1924) was the son of Felix Wakefield, one of Edward Gibbon Wakefield’s younger brothers. Edward was born in Launceston, Tasmania, brought up in New Zealand, and educated in France and at King's College London.

He married Agnes Mildred Hall on 15 July 1874 at Christchurch. She was the daughter of George Williamson Hall, and John Hall was thus her uncle. Edward and Agnes had four children: Edward Howard St George Wakefield (1875); Gerald Seymour Wakefield (1877); Grace Josephine Wakefield (1879); and Mildred Wakefield (1881).

Wakefield was a journalist and then a colourful, volatile and ambitious politician in New Zealand, who showed considerable promise, though this was not quite fulfilled; "He was among the best parliamentary debaters of the time; admired for his wit and power of argument." Prior to entering politics he was a public servant and served as the second Cabinet Secretary for the Fox Ministry in 1869.

He was the Member of Parliament for Geraldine 1875–1881, then for Selwyn 1884–1887, when he resigned. He won an 1884 by-election against John McLachlan, and was then elected unopposed in 1884 general election some five months later. He served as Colonial Secretary in the short 1884 ministry of Harry Atkinson; from 28 August to 3 September 1884.

Wakefield subsequently concentrated on writing, producing New Zealand after Fifty Years (1889). Later he moved to America, then London. Having become blind in old age, he was made a brother of the Charterhouse in recognition of his service, and resided there at the almshouse; he died there in 1924.

New Zealand Parliament
New constituency	Member of Parliament for Geraldine; 1875–1881	Succeeded by William Postlethwaite
Preceded by Edward Lee	Member of Parliament for Selwyn; 1884–1887	Succeeded by John Hall
