= Mabel Wilson =

Mabel Wilson may refer to:

- Mabel O. Wilson (born 1963), American architect, designer, and scholar
- Mabel Rose Wilson (1883–1962), New Zealand domestic worker and community leader
