= Ellesmere College, Leeston =

Ellesmere College

Location
- 52 Leeston Dunsandel Road, Leeston; 43.7580°S 172.2925°E

Information
- Type: State, Co-educational, Secondary
- Motto: Growing Great People
- Established: 1981
- Ministry of Education Institution no.: 349
- Principal: Antony French
- Enrolment: 571 (July 2026)
- Socio-economic decile: 8P
- Website: ellesmere.school.nz

Ellesmere College is a co-educational high school, located in Leeston in the Canterbury Region of New Zealand, with close to 500 students ranging from ages eleven to eighteen. It encourages voluntary activities such as music lessons, drama, and sports. The founding principal of the college was Brian Devonshire.

== History ==
Ellesmere College was founded in 1981, with a roll of 380 students, replacing Southbridge District High School.

=== Significant events ===
- 1980 – Ellesmere College was built in Timaru and transported to the present site. One classroom was lost during transportation in the Rakaia River.
- 1981 – Ellesmere College opened in February with 380 students and 23 staff. The founding principal of the college was Brian Devonshire.
- 1983 – The gymnasium was completed.
- 1984 – The official opening of Ellesmere College was declared by Hon Merv Wellington.
- 1985 – More classrooms were built.
- 1986 – The gymnasium was enlarged and dedicated to Riki Ellison.
- 1987 – The library was extended.
- 1988 – The playground was opened.
- 1994 – Ken Dawson was declared the new principal.
- 1997 – The library was split to form a new classroom, L2l
- 2000 – The Health Education Centre opened.
- 2008 – The gym was extended and the Wilson room was opened.
- 2008 – The last founding staff member retired.
- 2009 – The new stage and seating areas were completed.
- 2009 – Ken Dawson announced his resignation.
- 2010 – Students, staff and guests welcomed Gavin Kidd into the role as principal.
- 2017 – Gavin Kidd announced his resignation.
- 2018 – Ronan Bass appointed as Principal.
- 2019 – $30M significant redevelopment of school announced by Prime Minister Jacinda Ardern.
- 2024 – Ronan Bass resigns as principal, and Antony French announced as acting principal.
- 2024 – Work began on the new school buildings, on the green site of the current school grounds.
- 2025 – Antony French was declared the new principal.

== Enrolment ==
As of July 2026, Ellesmere College has roll of 571 students, of which 107 (18.7%) identify as Māori.

As of 2026, the school has an Equity Index of 462, placing it amongst schools whose students have average socioeconomic barriers to achievement (roughly equivalent to deciles 5 and 6 under the former socio-economic decile system).

== Notable alumni ==
- Sam Broomhall – All Blacks
- Daniel Carter – All Blacks
