= Geraldine (electorate) =

Geraldine was a former parliamentary electorate in the South Canterbury region of New Zealand that existed three times from 1875 to 1911. It was represented by six Members of Parliament.

== Population centres ==
In December 1887, the House of Representatives voted to reduce its membership from general electorates from 91 to 70. The 1890 electoral redistribution used the same 1886 census data used for the 1887 electoral redistribution. In addition, three-member electorates were introduced in the four main centres. This resulted in a major restructuring of electorates, and Geraldine was one of eight electorates to be re-created for the 1890 election.

== History ==
The electorate was formed for the 1875–1876 election, which was held on 27 December 1875 in this electorate. Edward Wakefield, John Hayhurst and Alexander Wilson contested the election, and gained 102, 102 and 44 votes, respectively. The returning officer thus used his casting vote and returned Wakefield as elected. In the 1881 election, Wakefield was defeated by William Postlethwaite.

The electorate was abolished for the 1887 election and the town of Geraldine was covered by the Rangitata electorate.

Geraldine was re-established for the 1890 election, and replaced again for the 1893 election; this time by the Pareora electorate. At the 1893 general election Frederick Flatman won Pareora from Arthur Rhodes the former Geraldine MP.

Geraldine was established for the third time for the 1896 election. It existed until 1911.

=== Members of Parliament ===
Geraldine was represented by six Members of Parliament:

Key

Independent Conservative Liberal

Election	Winner
1875 election	Edward Wakefield
1879 election	Edward Wakefield
1881 election	William Postlethwaite
1884 election	William Rolleston
(Electorate abolished 1887–1890)
1890 election	Arthur Rhodes
(Electorate abolished 1893–1896)
1896 election	Frederick Flatman
1899 election	Frederick Flatman
1902 election	Frederick Flatman
1905 election	Frederick Flatman
1908 election	Thomas Buxton
(Electorate abolished 1911)

== Election results ==
=== 1899 election ===
1899 general election: Geraldine
Party	Candidate	Votes	%	±%
Liberal	Frederick Flatman	2,331	65.90	+12.95
Independent	Charles Nicholson MacIntosh	775	21.91	
Conservative	John Fraser	431	12.19	
Majority		1,556	43.99	+38.09
Turnout		3,537	81.44	−0.67
Registered electors		4,343		

=== 1896 election ===
1896 general election: Geraldine
Party	Candidate	Votes	%	±%
Liberal	Frederick Flatman	1,893	52.95	
Conservative	Arthur Rhodes	1,682	47.05	
Majority		211	5.90	
Turnout		3,575	82.11	
Registered electors		4,354		

=== 1890 election ===
1890 general election: Geraldine
Party	Candidate	Votes	%	±%
Conservative	Arthur Rhodes	994	59.70	
Liberal	Searby Buxton	671	40.30	
Majority		323	19.39	
Turnout		1,665	66.30	
Registered electors		2,511		

=== 1884 election ===
1884 general election: Geraldine
Party	Candidate	Votes	%	±%
Independent	William Rolleston	473	52.79	
Independent	Alfred Cox	403	44.98	
Independent	Francis Franks	20	2.23	
Majority		70	7.81	
Turnout		896	61.71	
Registered electors		1,452		
