= William Postlethwaite =

New Zealand politician (1829–1908)

The Honourable William Postlethwaite

Member of Parliament for Geraldine
- In office 1881–1884
- Preceded by: Edward Wakefield
- Succeeded by: William Rolleston

Personal details
- Born: 17 September 1829 Broughton, Lancashire, England
- Died: 9 April 1908 (aged 78) Bootle, Cumberland, England
- Spouse: Annie Camilla Brisco (m. 1859)
- Profession: Farmer

William Postlethwaite JP DL (17 September 1829 – 9 April 1908) was an English-born Member of Parliament representing the Canterbury region of New Zealand.

Postlethwaite was born in Broughton, Lancashire, the son of Robert and Agnes Postlethwaite. He was tutored by Branwell Brontë, brother to the Brontë sisters. He married Annie Camilla Brisco, daughter of Sir Robert Brisco, 3rd Baronet, in 1859. He succeeded to his uncle's Oaks estate in Millom, Cumberland, but in an unusual move for landed gentry, moved to New Zealand in 1878.

New Zealand Parliament
| Years | Term | Electorate | Party |
|---|---|---|---|
| 1881–1884 | 8th | Geraldine | Independent |

Postlethwaite represented the Geraldine electorate from 1881 to 1884, when he retired. He was an independent politician.

He then moved to California in 1891, living as a farmer in Lindsay, but returned to England, where he died in 1908.

New Zealand Parliament
| Preceded by Edward Wakefield | Member of Parliament for Geraldine; 1881–1884 | Succeeded by William Rolleston |
