= Selwyn (electorate) =

- Single-member general constituency for the New Zealand House of Representatives
- Interactive map of boundaries from the 2026 election
- Formation: 1866, 1946, 1978, 2008
- Region: Canterbury
- Character: Rural
- Term: 3 years

Member for Selwyn
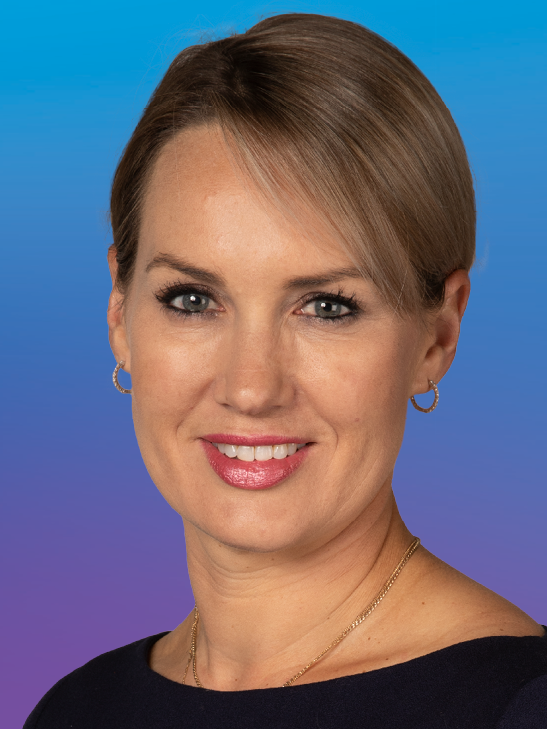
- Nicola Grigg since 17 October 2020
- Party: National
- Previous MP: Amy Adams (National)
Party vote distribution

Selwyn is a current electorate in the New Zealand House of Representatives, composed of towns on the outskirts of Christchurch city. The electorate was first formed for the 1866 election and has been abolished three times during its history. It was last re-established for the 2008 election and has been held by Nicola Grigg for the National Party since the 2020 election.

== Region and population centres ==
The electorate is mainly rural, stretching from the Southern Alps to the Banks Peninsula, its borders broadly defined by the Rakaia River in the south and the Waimakariri River in the north. Major towns include Rolleston, Lincoln, and Darfield, with smaller towns such as West Melton, Kirwee, Tai Tapu, Springfield, Castle Hill Village, Arthur's Pass, Leeston, Southbridge and Dunsandel. The electorate also includes parts of Christchurch city's territorial authority.

== History ==
=== Existence and changes to area ===
An electorate called Selwyn existed between 1866 and 1919. A Selwyn electorate also existed between 1946 and 1972 and again from 1978 until it was absorbed by Rakaia for the first MMP election in 1996. The latest version of the Selwyn electorate was created for the 2008 election. This followed a review of electoral boundaries conducted after the 2006 Census, because of a general northwards population movement in the South Island. Even though the number of South Island electorates is fixed, the decline in the population of electorates from Rakaia south has resulted in the boundaries of electorates from Invercargill north to Rakaia shifting further northwards.

Map of boundaries at the 2020 and 2023 general elections

Due to the rapid growth of Selwyn relative to Christchurch (which lost population after the earthquakes), the 2013 redistribution had Selwyn losing Halswell and Westmorland to Port Hills and Harewood to Waimakariri while regaining the towns of Rakaia and Chertsey back from Rangitata. Data from the 2018 census showed Selwyn's population had continued to grow – it had the largest discrepancy of any electorate – and so the electorate would need to lose further area for the 2020 boundaries. It shed an area around Hornby South to Wigram, the Banks Peninsula to the recreated Banks Peninsula, the area west of the Rakaia to Rangitata, and an area around Christchurch Airport to Ilam. Continued rapid growth in the electorate saw the towns of Prebbleton and Templeton transferred to Wigram in the 2025 boundary review.

=== Voting history ===
Edward Stevens was the electorate's first representative in 1866; he was returned elected unopposed.

The dominant topic for the 1875 election was the abolition of the Provinces. William Reeves, the incumbent, favoured the retention of the provincial system of government, while his opponent, Cecil Fitzroy, was an abolitionist. Fitzroy, who was 31 years old and 20 years Reeves' junior, narrowly won the election. Edward Lee acted as returning officer for the election.

In the 1879 election, John Hall was returned unopposed. In the 1881 election, Hall beat R. Lockhead by 467 to 169 votes.

In the 1890 election, Alfred Saunders, Thomas Hamilton Anson, and William Jerrington Popple received 536, 485 and 237 votes, respectively.

The electorate is one of the National Party's safest seats. National have held the seat, whenever it has existed since it was first recreated in 1946. In 2011, the candidate for the other major New Zealand party, Labour, received less than 11% of the electoral vote and came third, behind the Greens in the 2011 election. In that election, the only polling booths where Adams didn't receive the most votes were Arthur's Pass and Diamond Harbour.

=== Members of Parliament ===
Key:

Independent Conservative Reform Liberal National Green

Election	Winner
1866 election	Edward Stevens
1871 election	William Reeves
1875 election	Cecil Fitzroy
1879 election	John Hall
1881 election	John Hall
1883 by-election	Edward Lee
1884 by-election	Edward Wakefield
1884 election	Edward Wakefield
1887 election	John Hall
1890 election	Alfred Saunders
1893 election	Alfred Saunders
1896 election	Cathcart Wason
1899 election	Charles Hardy
1902 election	Charles Hardy
1905 election	Charles Hardy
1908 election	Charles Hardy
1911 election	William Dickie
1914 election	William Dickie
(Electorate abolished 1919–1946)
1946 election	John McAlpine
1949 election	John McAlpine
1951 election	John McAlpine
1954 election	John McAlpine
1957 election	John McAlpine
1960 election	John McAlpine
1963 election	John McAlpine
1966 election	Colin McLachlan
1969 election	Colin McLachlan
(Electorate abolished 1972–1978, see Rakaia)
1978 election	Colin McLachlan
1981 election	Ruth Richardson
1984 election	Ruth Richardson
1987 election	Ruth Richardson
1990 election	Ruth Richardson
1993 election	Ruth Richardson
1994 by-election	David Carter
(Electorate abolished 1996–2008, see Banks Peninsula & Rakaia)
2008 election	Amy Adams
2011 election	Amy Adams
2014 election	Amy Adams
2017 election	Amy Adams
2020 election	Nicola Grigg
2023 election	Nicola Grigg
2026 election	Nicola Grigg

=== List MPs ===
Members of Parliament elected from party lists in elections where that person also unsuccessfully contested the Selwyn electorate. Unless otherwise stated, all MPs terms began and ended at general elections.

Election	Winner
2011 election	Eugenie Sage

== Election results ==
=== 2026 election ===
The next election will be held on 7 November 2026. Candidates for Selwyn are listed at Candidates in the 2026 New Zealand general election by electorate § Selwyn. Official results will be available after 27 November 2026.

=== 2023 election ===
2023 general election results: Selwyn
Notes:	Blue background denotes the winner of the electorate vote. Pink background denotes a candidate elected from their party list. Yellow background denotes an electorate win by a list member, or other incumbent. A ✓ or ✗ denotes status of any incumbent, win or lose respectively.						
Party	Candidate	Votes	%	±%	Party votes	%	±%
National	✓ Nicola Grigg	31,504	65.42	+15.87	23,959	49.27	+15.26
Labour	Luke Jones	11,722	24.34	−13.48	8,805	18.10	−24.02
ACT	Ben Harvey	2,822	5.86	+1.40	5,895	12.12	−0.44
NZ Loyal	Logan Courtney	1,022	2.12		430	0.88	
New Conservatives	Abe Coulter	506	1.05	−1.10	136	0.28	−1.49
Green					4,340	8.93	+4.06
NZ First					2,633	5.42	+3.42
Opportunities					1,311	2.70	+1.38
Te Pāti Māori					235	0.48	+0.34
NewZeal					225	0.46	
Legalise Cannabis					184	0.38	+0.18
Animal Justice					91	0.19	
DemocracyNZ					89	0.18	
Freedoms NZ					62	0.13	
Leighton Baker Party					41	0.08	
Women's Rights					39	0.08	
New Nation					30	0.06	
Informal votes		578			119		
Total valid votes		48,154			48,624		
National hold	Majority	19,782	41.08	+29.35			

=== 2020 election ===
2020 general election: Selwyn
Notes:	Blue background denotes the winner of the electorate vote. Pink background denotes a candidate elected from their party list. Yellow background denotes an electorate win by a list member, or other incumbent. A ✓ or ✗ denotes status of any incumbent, win or lose respectively.						
Party	Candidate	Votes	%	±%	Party votes	%	±%
National	Nicola Grigg	20,986	49.55	−16.31	14,616	34.01	−25.00
Labour	Reuben Davidson	16,018	37.82	+17.05	18,102	42.12	+16.01
ACT	Stuart Armstrong	1,890	4.46	+4.01	5,396	12.56	+12.10
Green	Abe O'Donnell	1,749	4.13	−2.23	2,092	4.87	−0.44
New Conservative	Bronwyn Lyell	910	2.15	—	761	1.77	+1.57
Independent	Calvin Payne	436	1.03	—			
Advance NZ	Jerry Larason	362	0.85	—	306	0.71	—
NZ First					861	2.00	−3.53
Opportunities					564	1.31	−1.25
Legalise Cannabis					85	0.20	+0.02
Māori Party					59	0.14	−0.03
ONE					49	0.11	—
Outdoors					38	0.09	+0.01
Sustainable NZ					25	0.06	—
TEA					9	0.02	—
Vision NZ					5	0.01	—
Heartland					4	0.01	—
Social Credit					2	0.00	−0.00
Informal votes		654			219		
Total valid votes		42,351			42,975		
National hold	Majority	4,968	11.73	−33.36			

=== 2017 election ===
2017 general election: Selwyn
Notes:	Blue background denotes the winner of the electorate vote. Pink background denotes a candidate elected from their party list. Yellow background denotes an electorate win by a list member, or other incumbent. A ✓ or ✗ denotes status of any incumbent, win or lose respectively.						
Party	Candidate	Votes	%	±%	Party votes	%	±%
National	✓ Amy Adams	28,686	65.86	−4.11	26,003	59.00	−4.58
Labour	Tony Condon	9,047	20.77	+9.22	11,508	26.11	+13.14
Green	Chrys Horn	2,772	6.36	−5.19	2,339	5.30	−5.60
NZ First	Lindy Michelle Palmer	1,345	3.08	−2.15	2,440	5.53	−1.42
Opportunities	Nicky Snoyink	1,270	2.91	—	1,131	2.56	—
ACT	Brian Davidson	198	0.45	+0.21	201	0.45	+0.06
Conservative					87	0.2	−3.29
Legalise Cannabis					79	0.2	−0.13
Māori Party					75	0.17	−0.14
Ban 1080					41	0.09	−0.13
Outdoors					36	0.08	—
United Future					32	0.07	−0.17
People's Party					11	0.02	—
Internet					6	0.01	−0.5 (Note: 2017 Internet Party swing is relative to the votes for Internet-Mana in 2014; it shared a party list with Mana Party in the 2014 election)
Democrats					3	0.01	−0.02
Mana					2	0	−0.51 (Note: 2017 Mana Party swing is relative to the votes for Internet-Mana in 2014; it shared a party list with the Internet Party in the 2014 election)
Informal votes		235			74		
Total valid votes		43,553			44,068		
National hold	Majority	19,639	45.09	−13.33			

=== 2014 election ===
2014 general election: Selwyn
Notes:	Blue background denotes the winner of the electorate vote. Pink background denotes a candidate elected from their party list. Yellow background denotes an electorate win by a list member, or other incumbent. A ✓ or ✗ denotes status of any incumbent, win or lose respectively.						
Party	Candidate	Votes	%	±%	Party votes	%	±%
National	✓ Amy Adams	24,625	69.97	+0.83	22,809	63.58	+0.93
Green	Peter Selwyn Hill	4,064	11.55	+1.37	3,910	10.90	−0.54
Labour	Gordon John Dickson	3,835	10.90	−4.37	4,654	12.97	−3.15
NZ First	Bill Woods	1,841	5.23	+1.69	2,494	6.95	+2.20
Conservative	Roger Clibborn	619	1.76	−0.12	1,253	3.49	+1.03
Māori Party	Sheryl Gardyne	129	0.37	+0.37	111	0.31	−0.06
ACT	Paul Gilbert	83	0.24	+0.24	139	0.39	−0.52
Internet Mana					184	0.51	+0.37
Legalise Cannabis					120	0.33	+0.00
United Future					87	0.24	−0.45
Ban 1080					78	0.22	+0.22
Civilian					16	0.04	+0.04
Democrats					10	0.03	−0.01
Focus					5	0.01	+0.01
Independent Coalition					5	0.01	+0.01
Informal votes		182			65		
Total valid votes		35,196			35,875		
National hold	Majority	20,561	58.42	+4.54			

=== 2011 election ===
2011 general election: Selwyn
Notes:	Blue background denotes the winner of the electorate vote. Pink background denotes a candidate elected from their party list. Yellow background denotes an electorate win by a list member, or other incumbent. A ✓ or ✗ denotes status of any incumbent, win or lose respectively.						
Party	Candidate	Votes	%	±%	Party votes	%	±%
National	✓ Amy Adams	24,963	69.14	+8.65	23,086	62.65	+7.74
Labour	Jo McLean	5,512	15.27	−14.54	5,942	16.12	−9.49
Green	Eugenie Sage	3,674	10.18	+10.18	4,215	11.44	+3.91
NZ First	Bill Woods	1,277	3.54	+3.54	1,750	4.75	+1.71
Conservative	Wilton Gray	677	1.88	+1.88	906	2.46	+2.46
ACT					336	0.91	−2.77
United Future					256	0.69	−0.45
Māori Party					137	0.37	−0.04
Legalise Cannabis					123	0.33	+0.07
Mana					52	0.14	+0.14
Alliance					24	0.07	+0.02
Democrats					13	0.04	+0.02
Libertarianz					11	0.03	+0.01
Informal votes		526			192		
Total valid votes		36,103			36,851		
National hold	Majority	19,451	53.88	+23.20			

Electorate (as at 26 November 2011): 46,937

=== 2008 election ===
2008 general election: Selwyn
Notes:	Blue background denotes the winner of the electorate vote. Pink background denotes a candidate elected from their party list. Yellow background denotes an electorate win by a list member, or other incumbent. A ✓ or ✗ denotes status of any incumbent, win or lose respectively.						
Party	Candidate	Votes	%	±%	Party votes	%	±%
National	Amy Adams	21,836	60.49		20,141	54.91	
Labour	David Coates	10,761	29.81		9,395	25.61	
Progressive	Philippa Main	1,316	3.65		672	1.83	
Independent	Bill Woods	603	1.67				
ACT	Ivor Watson	539	1.49		1,350	3.68	
Family Party	Samuel Dennis	493	1.37		141	0.38	
Kiwi	Eleanor Williamson	296	0.82		191	0.52	
United Future	Victoria Norman	253	0.70		421	1.15	
Green					2,761	7.53	
NZ First					1,115	3.04	
Bill and Ben					201	0.55	
Māori Party					151	0.41	
Legalise Cannabis					97	0.26	
Alliance					17	0.05	
Libertarianz					8	0.02	
Democrats					7	0.02	
Workers Party					5	0.01	
RAM					3	0.01	
Pacific					2	0.01	
RONZ					1	0.00	
Informal votes		409			155		
Total valid votes		36,097			36,679		
National win new seat	Majority	11,075	30.68				

=== 1994 by-election ===
A by-election was held following the resignation of Ruth Richardson.

1994 Selwyn by-election
Party	Candidate	Votes	%	±%
National	David Carter	8,906	42.32	
Alliance	John Wright	8,488	40.33	
Labour	Marian Hobbs	2,173	10.33	
NZ First	Tim Shadbolt	1,165	5.54	
Christian Heritage	Rosemary Francis	182	0.86	
NORML	Warren Bryson	39	0.19	
Kiwis Against Further Immigration	Bruce Annan	29	0.14	
McGillicuddy Serious	Tim Owens	26	0.12	
Natural Law	Warwick Jones	22	0.10	
NZ Coalition	Kieron Daok	10	0.05	
Christ's Ambassadors Union	Victor Bryer	2	0.01	
Majority		418	1.99	
Turnout		21,042		

=== 1993 election ===
1993 general election: Selwyn
Party	Candidate	Votes	%	±%
National	Ruth Richardson	9,463	41.23	−12.89
Labour	Ron Mark	8,575	37.36	
Alliance	John McCaskey	2,898	12.62	
NZ First	Brooke McKenzie	1,496	6.51	
Christian Heritage	Gordon Dennis	425	1.85	+0.91
Natural Law	Russell Mack	92	0.40	
Majority		888	3.86	−22.47
Turnout		22,949	84.48	−0.14
Registered electors		27,162		

=== 1990 election ===
1990 general election: Selwyn
Party	Candidate	Votes	%	±%
National	Ruth Richardson	11,183	54.12	−0.88
Labour	Val Elley	5,742	27.79	
Green	Chris Newsom	1,693	8.19	
NewLabour	Maevis Watson	1,246	6.03	
Democrats	Jonathan Palmer	227	1.09	−2.19
McGillicuddy Serious	Steve Richards	225	1.08	
Independent National	Gordon Dennis	195	0.94	−0.05
Social Credit	Kieron Daok	151	0.73	
Majority		5,441	26.33	+11.14
Turnout		20,662	84.62	−3.32
Registered electors		24,416		

=== 1987 election ===
1987 general election: Selwyn
Party	Candidate	Votes	%	±%
National	Ruth Richardson	10,720	55.00	+5.02
Labour	Bill Woods	7,758	39.80	
Democrats	Jonathan Palmer	640	3.28	
Independent National	Gordon Dennis	194	0.99	
Wizard Party	Cyril Walker	177	0.90	
Majority		2,962	15.19	−3.80
Turnout		19,489	87.94	−10.61
Registered electors		22,160		

=== 1984 election ===
1984 general election: Selwyn
Party	Candidate	Votes	%	±%
National	Ruth Richardson	10,076	49.98	+2.55
Labour	Charles Manning	6,247	30.98	
NZ Party	Murray MacDonald	2,859	14.18	
Social Credit	James Gribben	977	4.84	−10.92
Majority		3,829	18.99	+8.36
Turnout		20,159	98.55	+8.75
Registered electors		20,455		

=== 1981 election ===
1981 general election: Selwyn
Party	Candidate	Votes	%	±%
National	Ruth Richardson	9,496	47.43	
Labour	Bill Woods	7,367	36.79	−1.84
Social Credit	James Gribben	3,157	15.76	+1.97
Majority		2,129	10.63	
Turnout		20,020	89.80	+23.86
Registered electors		22,293		

=== 1978 election ===
1978 general election: Selwyn
Party	Candidate	Votes	%	±%
National	Colin McLachlan	8,335	45.33	
Labour	Bill Woods	7,103	38.63	
Social Credit	James Gribben	2,537	13.79	
Values	A G Fairweather	411	2.23	
Majority		1,232	6.70	
Turnout		18,386	65.94	
Registered electors		27,882		

=== 1966 election ===
1966 general election: Selwyn
Party	Candidate	Votes	%	±%
National	Colin McLachlan	7,374	52.46	
Labour	Thomas Kelvin Campbell	4,777	33.99	
Social Credit	Maurice McConnell	1,903	13.54	
Majority		2,597	18.47	
Turnout		14,054	84.95	−2.57
Registered electors		16,542		

=== 1963 election ===
1963 general election: Selwyn
Party	Candidate	Votes	%	±%
National	John McAlpine	8,164	56.41	+0.17
Labour	Francis Edward Smith	4,793	33.12	
Social Credit	Ron Morton	942	6.50	−0.73
Liberal	Eric Lester May	572	3.95	
Majority		3,371	23.29	+3.57
Turnout		14,471	87.52	−2.03
Registered electors		16,534		

=== 1960 election ===
1960 general election: Selwyn
Party	Candidate	Votes	%	±%
National	John McAlpine	8,096	56.24	+3.05
Labour	John Palmer	5,257	36.51	
Social Credit	Ron Morton	1,042	7.23	+1.45
Majority		2,839	19.72	+7.55
Turnout		14,395	89.55	−2.18
Registered electors		16,074		

=== 1957 election ===
1957 general election: Selwyn
Party	Candidate	Votes	%	±%
National	John McAlpine	7,564	53.19	+2.27
Labour	Stanley Marshall Cook	5,833	41.01	
Social Credit	Ron Morton	823	5.78	
Majority		1,731	12.17	−7.66
Turnout		14,220	91.73	+4.74
Registered electors		15,501		

=== 1954 election ===
1954 general election: Selwyn
Party	Candidate	Votes	%	±%
National	John McAlpine	6,473	50.92	−4.94
Labour	Daniel Clinton	3,852	30.30	
Social Credit	Terence Ward	2,387	18.77	
Majority		2,521	19.83	+8.10
Turnout		12,712	86.99	−4.09
Registered electors		14,612		

=== 1951 election ===
1951 general election: Selwyn
Party	Candidate	Votes	%	±%
National	John McAlpine	8,738	55.86	+1.47
Labour	Jim Barclay	6,902	44.13	
Majority		1,836	11.73	+2.94
Turnout		15,640	91.08	−2.98
Registered electors		17,170		

=== 1949 election ===
1949 general election: Selwyn
Party	Candidate	Votes	%	±%
National	John McAlpine	8,205	54.39	+2.64
Labour	Alan Sharp	6,878	45.60	−2.65
Majority		1,327	8.79	+5.29
Turnout		15,083	94.06	−0.94
Registered electors		16,035		

=== 1946 election ===
1949 general election: Selwyn
Party	Candidate	Votes	%	±%
National	John McAlpine	6,970	51.75	
Labour	Alan Sharp	6,498	48.25	
Majority		472	3.50	
Turnout		13,468	93.12	
Registered electors		14,463		

=== 1899 election ===
1899 general election: Selwyn
Party	Candidate	Votes	%	±%
Conservative	Charles Hardy	1,308	38.96	
Liberal	John Rennie	1,168	34.79	
Liberal	John Barrett	454	13.52	
Liberal	Kenneth Wilson	427	12.72	
Majority		140	4.17	−1.57
Turnout		3,357	74.93	−10.05
Registered electors		4,480		

=== 1896 election ===
1896 general election: Selwyn
Party	Candidate	Votes	%	±%
Conservative	Cathcart Wason	1,676	52.87	
Independent	Alfred Saunders	1,494	47.13	
Majority		182	5.74	
Turnout		3,170	84.99	
Registered electors		3,730		

=== 1890 election ===
1890 general election: Selwyn
Party	Candidate	Votes	%	±%
Independent	Alfred Saunders	536	42.61	
Conservative	Thomas Hamilton Anson	485	38.55	
Liberal	William Jerrington Popple	237	18.84	
Majority		51	4.05	
Turnout		1,258	62.49	
Registered electors		2,013		

=== 1884 by-election ===
1884 Selwyn by-election
Party	Candidate	Votes	%	±%
Independent	Edward Wakefield	479	60.25	
Independent	John McLachlan	316	39.75	
Majority		163	20.50	
Turnout		795		+177

=== 1883 by-election ===
1883 Selwyn by-election
Party	Candidate	Votes	%	±%
Independent	Edward Lee	258	41.75	
Independent	Edward Richardson	220	35.60	
Independent	John McLachlan	140	22.65	
Turnout		618		
Majority		38	6.15	

=== 1875 election ===
1875 general election: Selwyn
Party	Candidate	Votes	%	±%
Independent	Cecil Fitzroy	244	51.48	
Independent	William Reeves	230	48.52	
Majority		14	2.95	
Turnout		474	68.30	
Registered electors		694		
