= Edward Lee (politician) =

New Zealand politician

New Zealand Parliament
| Years | Term | Electorate | Party |
|---|---|---|---|
| 1883 | 8th | Selwyn | Independent |

Edward James Lee (1822 – 18 December 1883) was a 19th-century Member of Parliament from the Canterbury region of New Zealand.

He was the returning officer for the 1875 election in Selwyn.

He represented the Selwyn electorate in 1883, from a by-election on 6 April to 18 December, when he died.

New Zealand Parliament
| Preceded by John Hall | Member of Parliament for Selwyn; 1883 | Succeeded by Edward Wakefield |
