= 1883 Selwyn by-election =

New Zealand by-election

The 1883 Selwyn by-election was a by-election held on 6 April 1883 during the 8th New Zealand Parliament in the Canterbury electorate of Selwyn.

The by-election was caused by the resignation of the incumbent MP John Hall.

The by-election was won by Edward Lee.

A government supporter, he was opposed by the Hon. Edward Richardson and John McLachlan.

== Results ==
The following table gives the election result:

1883 Selwyn by-election
Party	Candidate	Votes	%	±%
Independent	Edward Lee	258	41.75	
Independent	Edward Richardson	220	35.60	
Independent	John McLachlan	140	22.65	
Turnout		618		
Majority		38	6.15	
