= Southbridge District High School =

Secondary school in New Zealand

Coordinates: 43.8094°S 172.2531°E

The Southbridge District High School was a school in Southbridge, New Zealand until 1981.

== History ==
The Southbridge Primary School which is still in use today, based in Southbridge, New Zealand, was founded in 1868 with a roll of 20 students. The school was enlarged and reached its greatest number of students (389) in 1890. The Southbridge District High School was opened in 1903 and used some of the Primary School buildings. It continued with the Primary and High school merged until 23 October 1924 when the buildings were destroyed by a suspicious fire. The Southbridge District High School was rebuilt on the original site, whilst the Primary School rebuilt on the opposite side of the street. While the Southbridge Primary School continued, the Southbridge District High School was replaced by Ellesmere College in Leeston by 1981.

== Notable alumni ==
- Cath Brown – artist
- Nigel Hampton – lawyer
