= Mabel Rose Wilson =

Mabel Rose Wilson (1883–1962) was a notable New Zealand domestic worker and community leader. She was born in Southbridge, North Canterbury, New Zealand in 1883.
