= Southbridge Primary School =

Location
- 25 Hastings Street, Southbridge, Canterbury, New Zealand; 43.8086°S 172.2528°E

Information
- Type: State Co-educational Primary, Years 1-6
- Established: 1868
- Ministry of Education Institution no.: 3509
- Principal: Peter Verstappen
- Enrolment: 124 (July 2026)
- Socio-economic decile: 9
- Website: www.southbridge.school.nz

Southbridge Primary School is a co-educational school based in Southbridge, New Zealand, for 5 to 11-year-old children. The school is divided into eight communities: Community 7 for year one students through to Community 1 for year six students. Community 8 is for new entrants in terms three and four.

== History ==
Southbridge School was founded in November 1868 with a roll of 20 students, and in 1890 reached a peak of 389 students. From 1903 to 1924 the school buildings were shared by the Southbridge District High School, until they were destroyed by fire on 23 October 1924. The school was rebuilt on the opposite side of the street from the original site.
