= Bill Dalley =

NZ international rugby union player

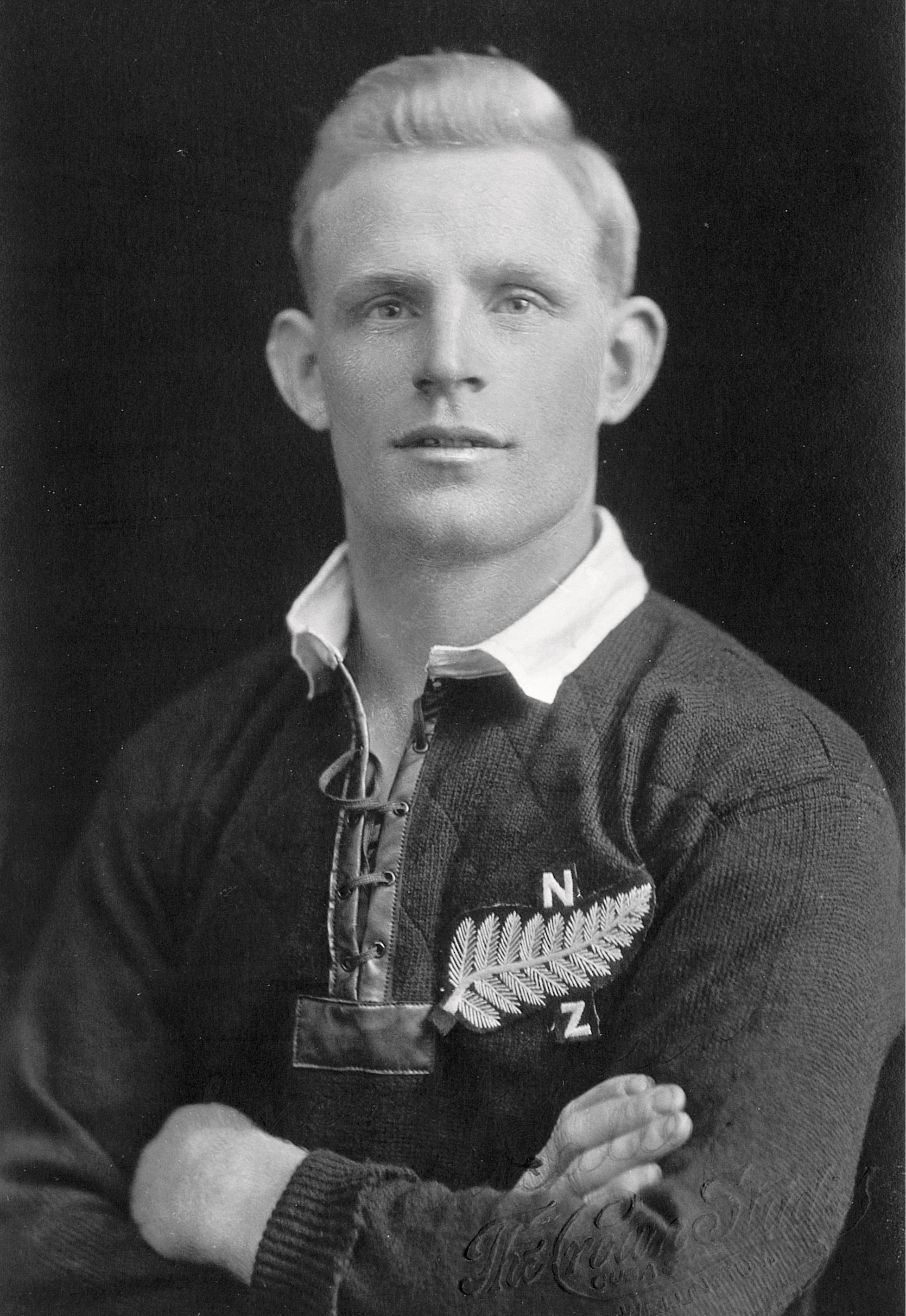
- Dalley in 1924
- Born: William Charles Dalley; 18 November 1901 Lyttelton, New Zealand
- Died: 9 February 1989 (aged 87) Christchurch, New Zealand
- Height: 1.63 m (5 ft 4 in)
- Weight: 63 kg (139 lb)
- School: Christchurch Boys' High School

Rugby union career
- Position: Halfback
Provincial / State sides
| Years | Team | Apps | (Points) |
| 1921–30 | Canterbury | 25 | |
International career
| Years | Team | Apps | (Points) |
| 1924–29 | New Zealand | 5 | (0) |

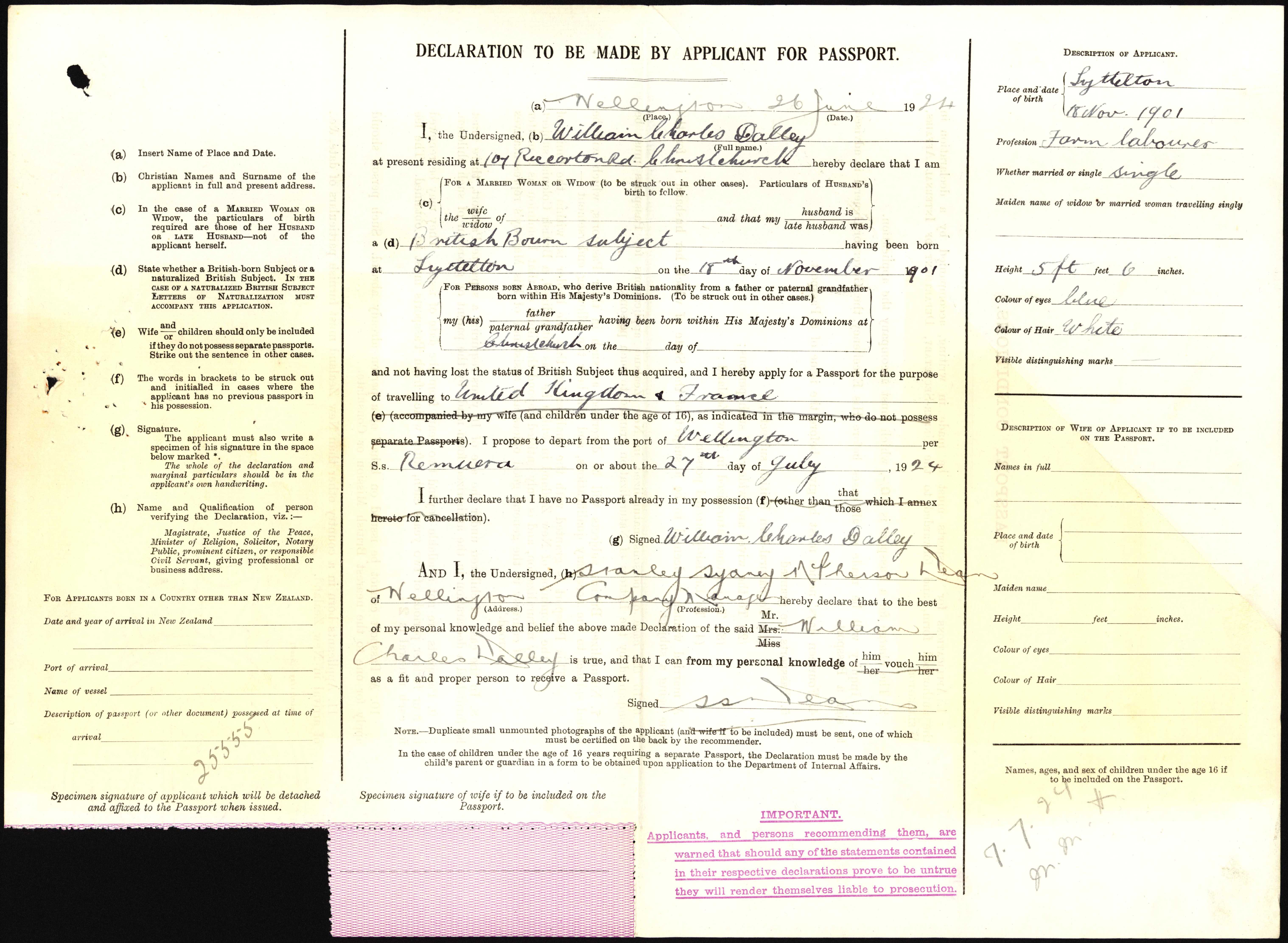
William Dalley passport application (1924)

William Charles Dalley (18 November 1901 – 9 February 1989) was a New Zealand rugby union player. Starting out as a utility back, Dalley made his debut at a provincial level for Canterbury in 1921. He became a specialist halfback in 1924, and was quickly selected for the New Zealand national side, the All Blacks, that year. Between then and 1929 he played 35 matches for the All Blacks including five internationals. He captained the side in his final two appearances in 1929. In all he scored five tries for the All Blacks. After retiring as a player, Dalley served as a member of the Canterbury Rugby Union's management committee from 1932 to 1955, the last three years as chairman.
