= Southbridge, New Zealand =

Town in Canterbury, New Zealand

Southbridge
- Rural settlement
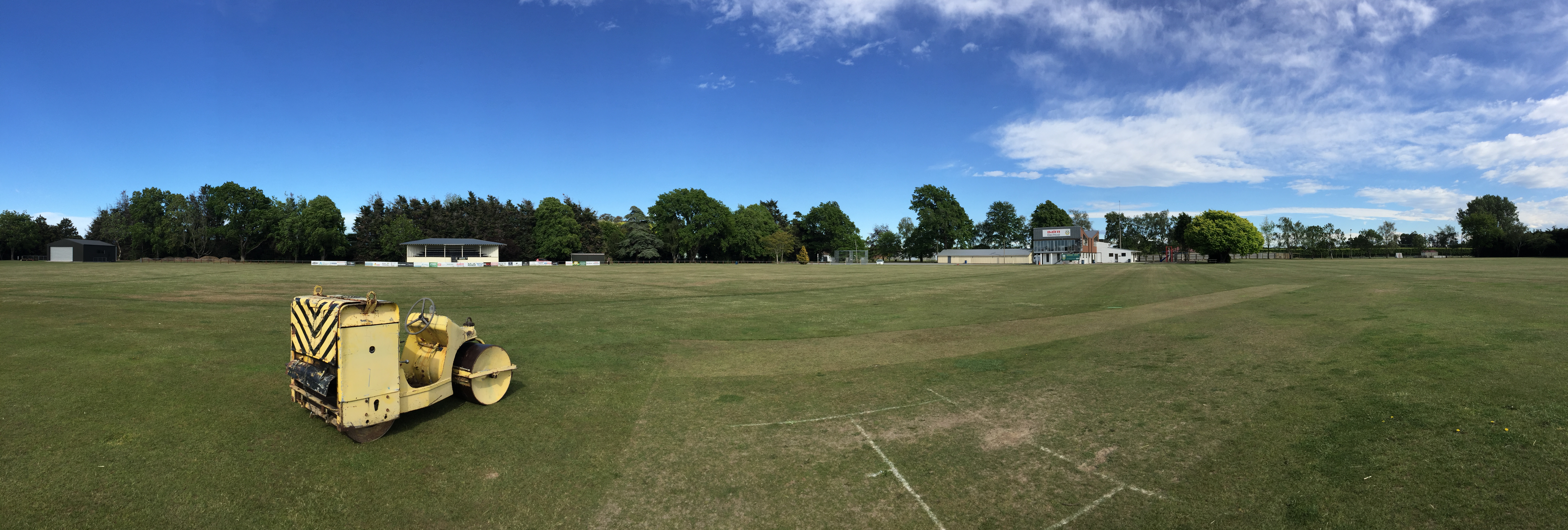
- Southbridge RFC cricket pitch
- Interactive map of Southbridge
- Coordinates: 43°49′S 172°15′E
- Country: New Zealand
- Region: Canterbury
- Territorial authority: Selwyn District
- Ward: Ellesmere
- Electorates: Selwyn; Te Tai Tonga (Māori)

Government
  - Territorial authority: Selwyn District Council
  - Regional council: Environment Canterbury
  - Mayor of Selwyn: Lydia Gliddon
  - Selwyn MP: Nicola Grigg
  - Te Tai Tonga MP: Mananui Ramsden

Area
  - Total: 2.22 km^{2} (0.86 sq mi)

Population (June 2025)
  - Total: 1,090
  - Density: 491/km^{2} (1,270/sq mi)
- Time zone: UTC+12 (NZST)
  - Summer (DST): UTC+13 (NZDT)

Southbridge is a small town on the Canterbury Plains in the South Island of New Zealand. It is located 45 kilometres (28 mi) southwest of Christchurch, between Leeston, Dunsandel and the Rakaia River.

The town serves mainly as a centre for agricultural services, but also has nearly 70 small to medium-sized businesses, a swimming pool, tennis courts, Southbridge Primary School, and many other attractions.

On 13 July 1875, a branch line railway was opened from Christchurch to Southbridge. Despite proposals to extend it further to Longbeach and Waterton, the line's terminus remained in Southbridge and it was thus known as the Southbridge Branch. Traffic was strong in the line's early decades; in 1914, two mixed trains and a goods-only train ran each way daily. However, the line entered into decline after the late 1920s. Passenger services to Southbridge were cancelled on 14 April 1951, and the line closed entirely on 30 June 1962. Few remnants of the line remain, though locations of level crossings can be discerned.

Ngāti Moki marae, a marae (tribal meeting ground) of Ngāi Tahu and its Te Taumutu Rūnanga branch, is located in Southbridge. It includes Ngāti Moki wharenui (meeting house).

== Demographics ==
Southbridge is described by Statistics New Zealand as a rural settlement. It covers 2.22 km^{2} (0.86 sq mi). It had an estimated population of 1,090 as of June 2025, with a population density of 491 people per km^{2}. It is part of the larger Southbridge statistical area.

Historical population for the Southbridge settlement
Year	Pop.	±% p.a.
2006	738	—
2013	861	+2.23%
2018	906	+1.02%
2023	999	+1.97%

The settlement had a population of 999 in the 2023 New Zealand census, an increase of 93 people (10.3%) since the 2018 census, and an increase of 138 people (16.0%) since the 2013 census. There were 495 males, 501 females, and 3 people of other genders in 369 dwellings. 2.7% of people identified as LGBTIQ+. The median age was 41.1 years (compared with 38.1 years nationally). There were 207 people (20.7%) aged under 15 years, 153 (15.3%) aged 15 to 29, 465 (46.5%) aged 30 to 64, and 174 (17.4%) aged 65 or older.

People could identify as more than one ethnicity. The results were 93.7% European (Pākehā); 12.3% Māori; 2.1% Pasifika; 2.1% Asian; 0.9% Middle Eastern, Latin American and African New Zealanders (MELAA); and 3.6% other, which includes people giving their ethnicity as "New Zealander". English was spoken by 98.2%, Māori by 1.2%, Samoan by 0.3%, and other languages by 4.5%. No language could be spoken by 1.8% (e.g. too young to talk). New Zealand Sign Language was known by 1.2%. The percentage of people born overseas was 16.8, compared with 28.8% nationally.

Religious affiliations were 23.4% Christian, 0.3% Hindu, 0.3% Māori religious beliefs, 0.3% New Age, and 1.2% other religions. People who answered that they had no religion were 64.9%, and 9.6% of people did not answer the census question.

Of those at least 15 years old, 129 (16.3%) people had a bachelor's or higher degree, 450 (56.8%) had a post-high school certificate or diploma, and 219 (27.7%) people exclusively held high school qualifications. The median income was $45,500, compared with $41,500 nationally. 57 people (7.2%) earned over $100,000 compared to 12.1% nationally. The employment status of those at least 15 was 432 (54.5%) full-time, 123 (15.5%) part-time, and 18 (2.3%) unemployed.

=== Southbridge statistical area ===
Southbridge statistical area surrounds and includes the settlement and covers 361.56 km^{2} (139.60 sq mi). It had an estimated population of 2,680 as of June 2025, with a population density of 7.4 people per km^{2}.

Historical population for the statistical area
Year	Pop.	±% p.a.
2006	2,163	—
2013	2,430	+1.68%
2018	2,490	+0.49%
2023	2,523	+0.26%

The statistical area had a population of 2,523 in the 2023 New Zealand census, an increase of 33 people (1.3%) since the 2018 census, and an increase of 93 people (3.8%) since the 2013 census. There were 1,305 males, 1,209 females, and 9 people of other genders in 969 dwellings. 2.6% of people identified as LGBTIQ+. The median age was 40.4 years (compared with 38.1 years nationally). There were 468 people (18.5%) aged under 15 years, 414 (16.4%) aged 15 to 29, 1,233 (48.9%) aged 30 to 64, and 408 (16.2%) aged 65 or older.

People could identify as more than one ethnicity. The results were 88.7% European (Pākehā); 11.4% Māori; 3.2% Pasifika; 5.2% Asian; 1.3% Middle Eastern, Latin American and African New Zealanders (MELAA); and 2.7% other, which includes people giving their ethnicity as "New Zealander". English was spoken by 97.0%, Māori by 1.7%, Samoan by 0.5%, and other languages by 6.8%. No language could be spoken by 2.4% (e.g. too young to talk). New Zealand Sign Language was known by 0.8%. The percentage of people born overseas was 17.7, compared with 28.8% nationally.

Religious affiliations were 28.5% Christian, 0.7% Hindu, 0.5% Islam, 0.2% Māori religious beliefs, 0.4% Buddhist, 0.5% New Age, 0.1% Jewish, and 1.1% other religions. People who answered that they had no religion were 57.7%, and 10.3% of people did not answer the census question.

Of those at least 15 years old, 351 (17.1%) people had a bachelor's or higher degree, 1,149 (55.9%) had a post-high school certificate or diploma, and 546 (26.6%) people exclusively held high school qualifications. The median income was $46,800, compared with $41,500 nationally. 198 people (9.6%) earned over $100,000 compared to 12.1% nationally. The employment status of those at least 15 was 1,179 (57.4%) full-time, 306 (14.9%) part-time, and 30 (1.5%) unemployed.

== Education ==
Southbridge School is a contributing primary school catering for years 1 to 6. It had a roll of 124 as of July 2026. The school was established in 1868.

Southbridge District High School opened in 1903 and shared space with the primary school until a fire in 1924 destroyed the buildings. It was rebuilt on the same site, while the primary school moved across the road. The high school closed in 1981.

== Notable people ==
- Colonel Allen Bell (1870–1936), politician born in Southbridge
- Dan Carter (born 1982), rugby union player born Leeston
- George Howes (1879–1946), entomologist born in Southbridge
- Pat McEvedy (1880–1935), rugby union player and administrator born in Southbridge
- Francie Turner (born 1992), coxswain who grew up in Southbridge
- Mabel Rose Wilson (1883–1962), domestic worker and community leader
