= John McLachlan (politician) =

New Zealand politician

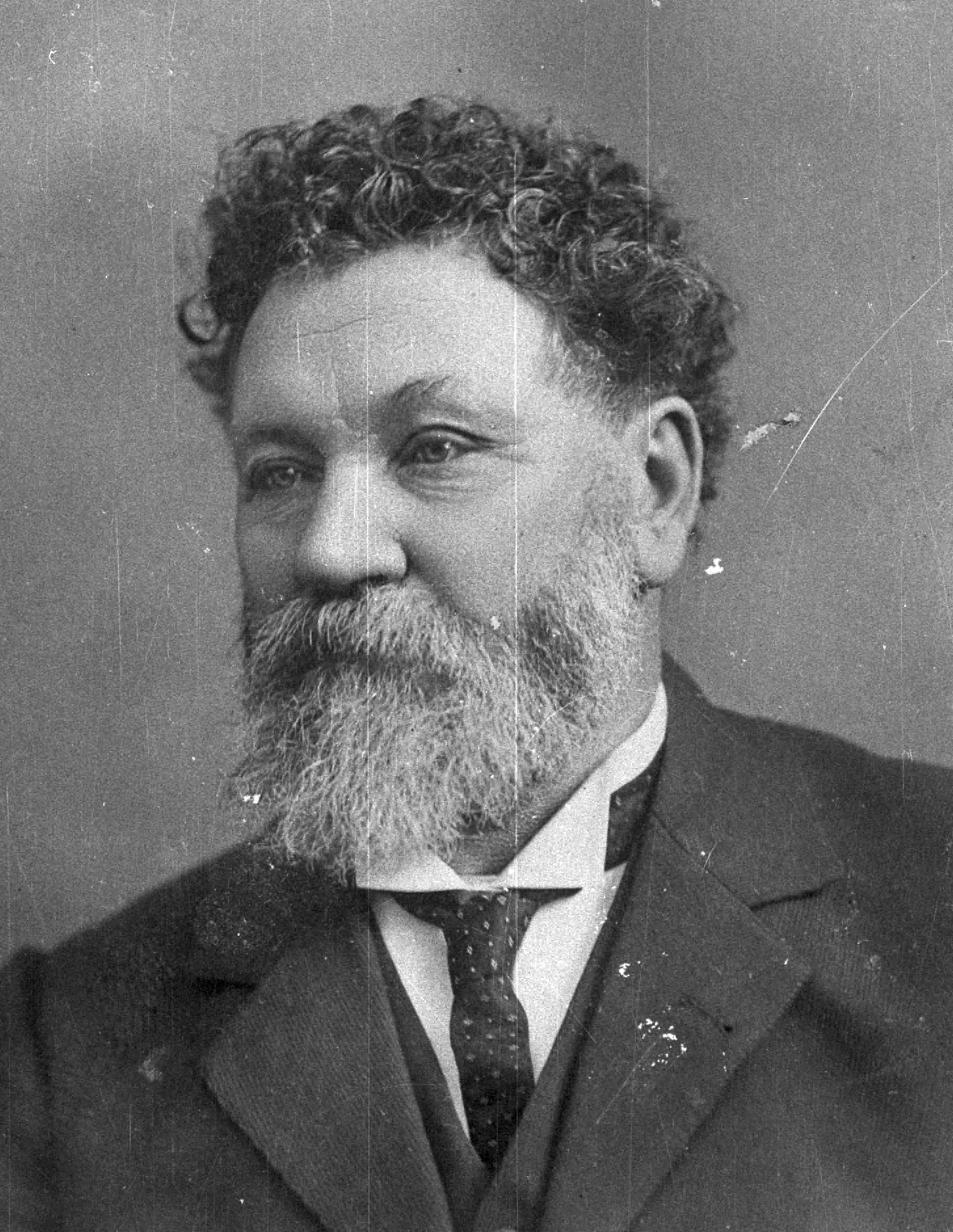

Member of the New Zealand Parliament for Ashburton
- In office 6 December 1899 – 2 December 1908
- Preceded by: Edward George Wright
- Succeeded by: William Nosworthy
- In office 28 November 1893 – 4 December 1896
- Preceded by: Edward George Wright
- Succeeded by: Edward George Wright

Personal details
- Born: 1840 Ardrossan, Ayrshire, Scotland
- Died: 11 September 1915 (aged 74–75) Ashburton, New Zealand
- Party: Liberal

John McLachlan (1840 – 11 September 1915) was a New Zealand Member of Parliament for Ashburton in the South Island.

== Early life ==
McLachlan was born in Ardrossan, Ayrshire, Scotland, in 1840. He learned his father's trade as a plasterer. He came to New Zealand in 1863 by the ship Sebastopol and arrived at Lyttelton. After some time spent in looking around the country, he chose land near Lake Ellesmere / Te Waihora and became a farmer.

His brothers, sister and his mother followed him to New Zealand.

== Member of Parliament ==
New Zealand Parliament
Years	Term	Electorate	Party
1893–1896	12th	Ashburton	Liberal
1899–1902	14th	Ashburton	Liberal
1902–1905	15th	Ashburton	Liberal
1905–1908	16th	Ashburton	Liberal

McLachlan stood for election in the Selwyn electorate for the Canterbury Provincial Council, but lost to Edward Jollie.

McLachlan unsuccessfully contested the 1883 by-election for Selwyn, coming third. He then unsuccessfully contested the Ellesmere electorate in the 1890 election, coming second and being beaten by John Hall.

He represented the Ashburton electorate in the House of Representatives for twelve years (1893–1896; 1899–1908). He came second to Edward George Wright in the 1896 election, but Wright retired in 1899.

He was a colourful character in Parliament.

"The representative of Ashburton", wrote a newspaper reporter, "is about the wildest looking specimen in the Parliamentary collection. But if he is in the rough to gaze on, he can give 'points' to some more ornamental members in the matter of ability and originality of thought and expression. He is a sturdily built, carelessly dressed man, with a large head, made to look larger by the wild disorder of a huge shock of curly hair. He is a farmer and might have stepped out of his market trap into his place in the House. He is, as a rule, a breezy, happy-go-lucky sort of member with a good sense of humour and a fine stock of anecdotes and a great admiration for and acquaintance with the writings of Robert Burns."

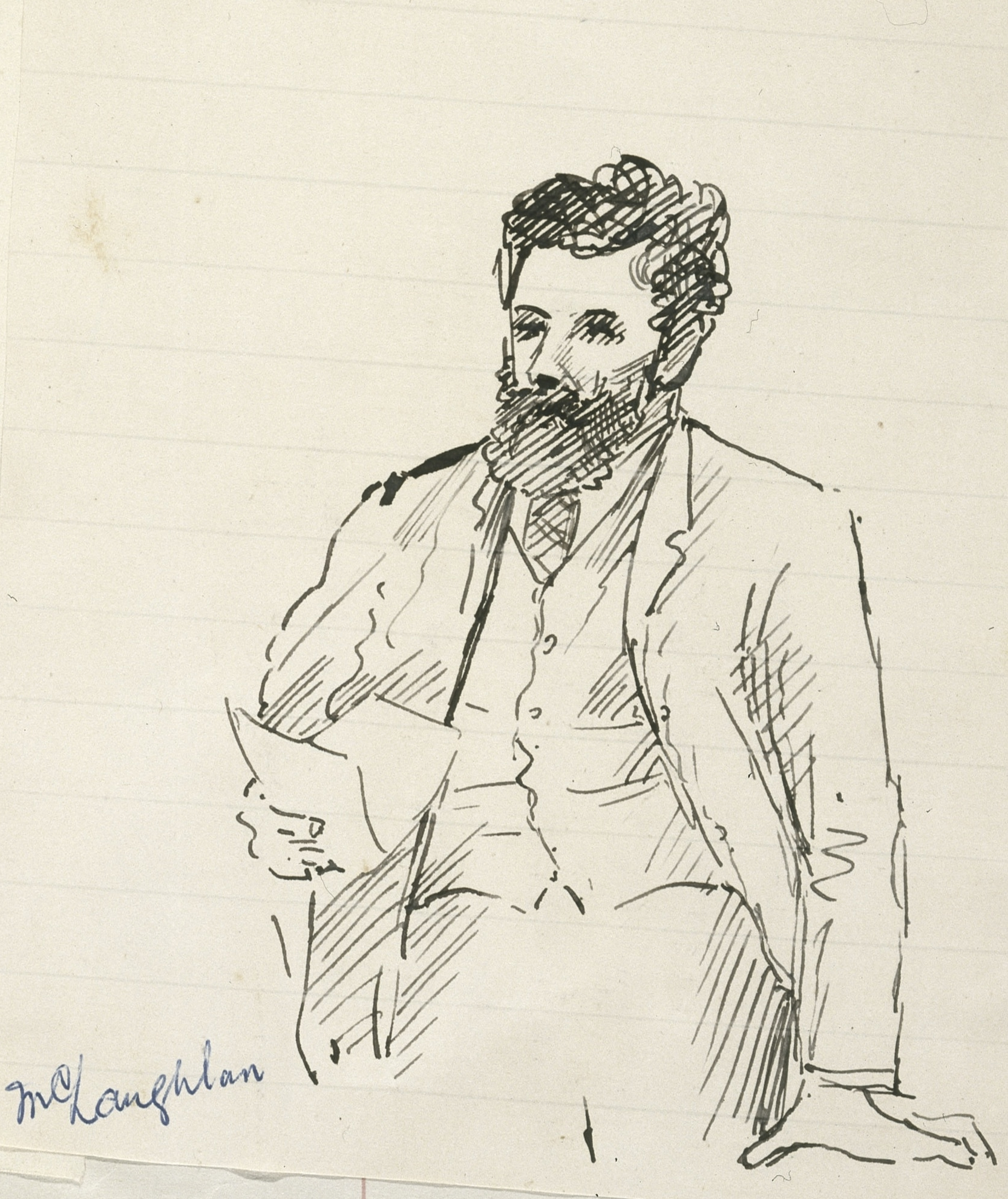
John McLachlan caricature, 1896

He was a leading Canterbury Presbyterian, and was known for his love of whisky. On occasions he spoke on the platform or in the house while intoxicated and made a fool of himself, and in 1894 he fell into Wellington Harbour when he mistook the lights of a ship for the lights outside a chemist's shop where he had lodgings. In 1907 he was 'almost certainly' the subject of a complaint by J. T. Marryat Hornsby to the Speaker about his language and his intoxicated condition in the house, which the Premier promised to have put right.

== Family and death ==
John McLachlan died on 11 September 1915. His son Alexander McLachlan (1870–1945) was a farmer and mill owner and Labour candidate for Mataura at the 1919 election. Archibald Albany McLachlan (1898–1961), a solicitor from Christchurch, was a grandson of John McLachlan. Archibald McLachlan stood in the 1928 election in the Riccarton electorate for the United Party, coming second to Bert Kyle. Kyle was the official candidate of the United–Reform Coalition for the 1931 election, and McLachlan opposed him in Riccarton as an Independent, again coming second. McLachlan stood in the 1935 election as an Independent in the Kaiapoi electorate and came third.

== Notes ==
New Zealand Parliament
Preceded by Edward George Wright	Member of Parliament for Ashburton; 1893–1896 1899–1908	Succeeded by Edward George Wright
Preceded by Edward George Wright	Member of Parliament for Ashburton; 1893–1896 1899–1908	Succeeded by William Nosworthy
