= Leeston =

- Town
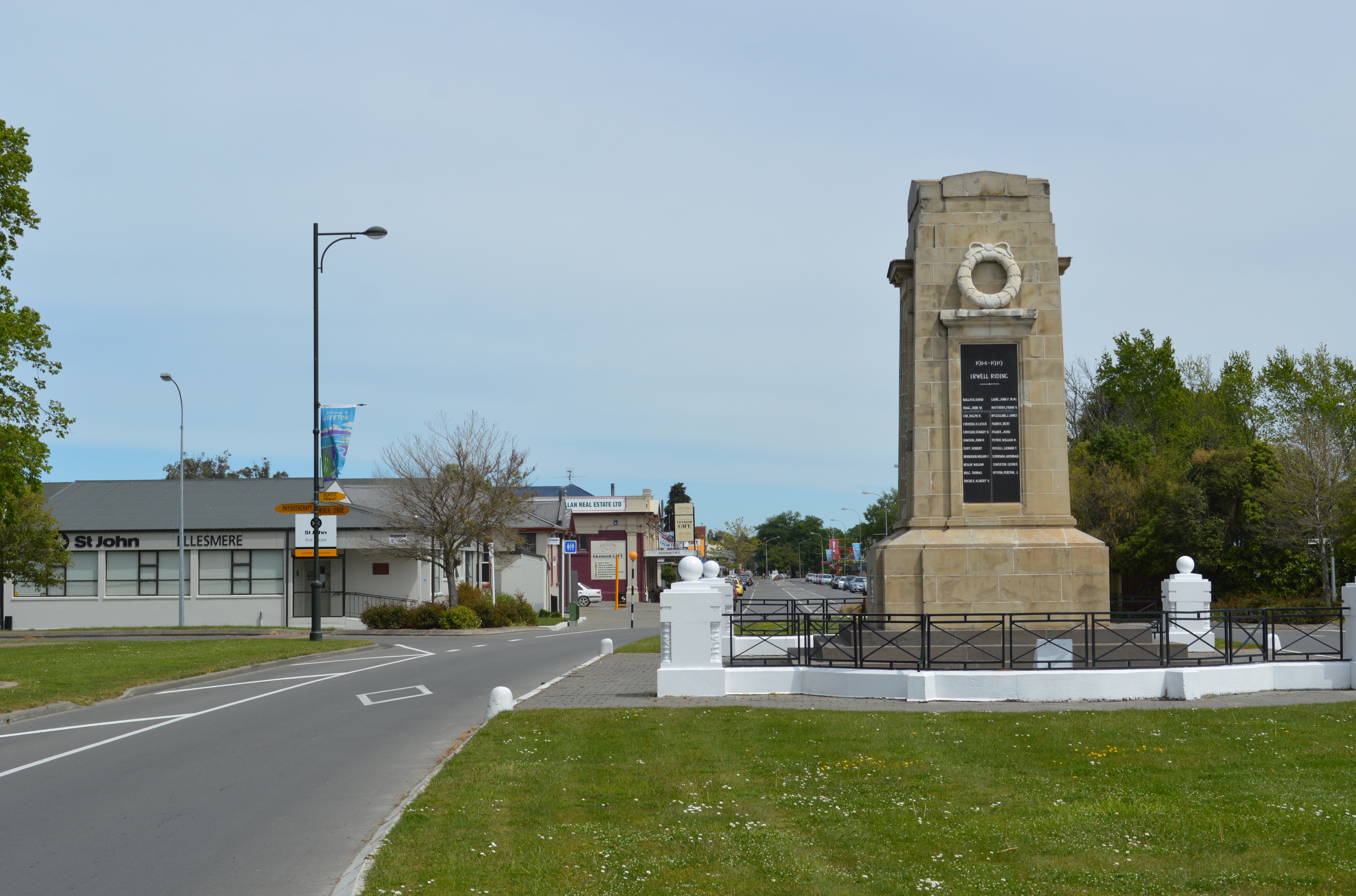
- Interactive map of Leeston
- Coordinates: 43°46′S 172°18′E
- Country: New Zealand
- Island: South Island
- Region: Canterbury
- Territorial authority: Selwyn District
- Ward: Ellesmere
- Electorates: Selwyn; Te Tai Tonga (Māori)

Government
  - Territorial authority: Selwyn District Council
  - Regional council: Environment Canterbury
  - Mayor of Selwyn: Lydia Gliddon
  - Selwyn MP: Nicola Grigg
  - Te Tai Tonga MP: Tākuta Ferris

Area
  - Total: 2.44 km^{2} (0.94 sq mi)

Population (June 2025)
  - Total: 2,470
  - Density: 1,010/km^{2} (2,620/sq mi)
- Time zone: UTC+12 (NZST)
  - Summer (DST): UTC+13 (NZDT)
- Postcode(s): 7632
- Local iwi: Ngāi Tahu

Leeston (Māori: Karumata) is a town on the Canterbury Plains in the South Island of New Zealand. It is located 30 kilometres southwest of Christchurch, between the shore of Lake Ellesmere / Te Waihora and the mouth of the Rakaia River. The town is home to a growing number of services which have increased and diversified along with the population. Leeston has a supermarket, schools (pre-school, primary school and high school), churches, hospital (for the elderly only), gym, cafes, restaurants, medical centre, pharmacy and post office. The Selwyn District Council currently has a service office in Leeston, after the headquarters was shifted to Rolleston.

== Demographics ==
Leeston is described by Statistics New Zealand as a small urban area, and covers 2.44 km^{2} (0.94 sq mi). It had an estimated population of 2,470 as of June 2025, with a population density of 1,012 people per km^{2}.

Historical population
Year	Pop.	±% p.a.
2006	1,326	—
2013	1,539	+2.15%
2018	2,208	+7.49%
2023	2,271	+0.56%

Leeston had a population of 2,271 in the 2023 New Zealand census, an increase of 63 people (2.9%) since the 2018 census, and an increase of 732 people (47.6%) since the 2013 census. There were 1,110 males, 1,158 females, and 3 people of other genders in 873 dwellings. 2.5% of people identified as LGBTIQ+. The median age was 39.9 years (compared with 38.1 years nationally). There were 471 people (20.7%) aged under 15 years, 333 (14.7%) aged 15 to 29, 1,032 (45.4%) aged 30 to 64, and 432 (19.0%) aged 65 or older.

People could identify as more than one ethnicity. The results were 90.9% European (Pākehā); 11.8% Māori; 1.6% Pasifika; 3.4% Asian; 0.9% Middle Eastern, Latin American and African New Zealanders (MELAA); and 3.4% other, which includes people giving their ethnicity as "New Zealander". English was spoken by 97.1%, Māori by 1.5%, Samoan by 0.1%, and other languages by 6.3%. No language could be spoken by 2.4% (e.g. too young to talk). New Zealand Sign Language was known by 0.9%. The percentage of people born overseas was 17.4, compared with 28.8% nationally.

Religious affiliations were 30.9% Christian, 0.4% Hindu, 0.4% Islam, 0.1% Māori religious beliefs, 0.3% Buddhist, 0.7% New Age, and 1.1% other religions. People who answered that they had no religion were 59.6%, and 6.5% of people did not answer the census question.

Of those at least 15 years old, 288 (16.0%) people had a bachelor's or higher degree, 1,044 (58.0%) had a post-high school certificate or diploma, and 462 (25.7%) people exclusively held high school qualifications. The median income was $44,000, compared with $41,500 nationally. 168 people (9.3%) earned over $100,000 compared to 12.1% nationally. The employment status of those at least 15 was 984 (54.7%) full-time, 228 (12.7%) part-time, and 24 (1.3%) unemployed.

== Leisure and entertainment ==
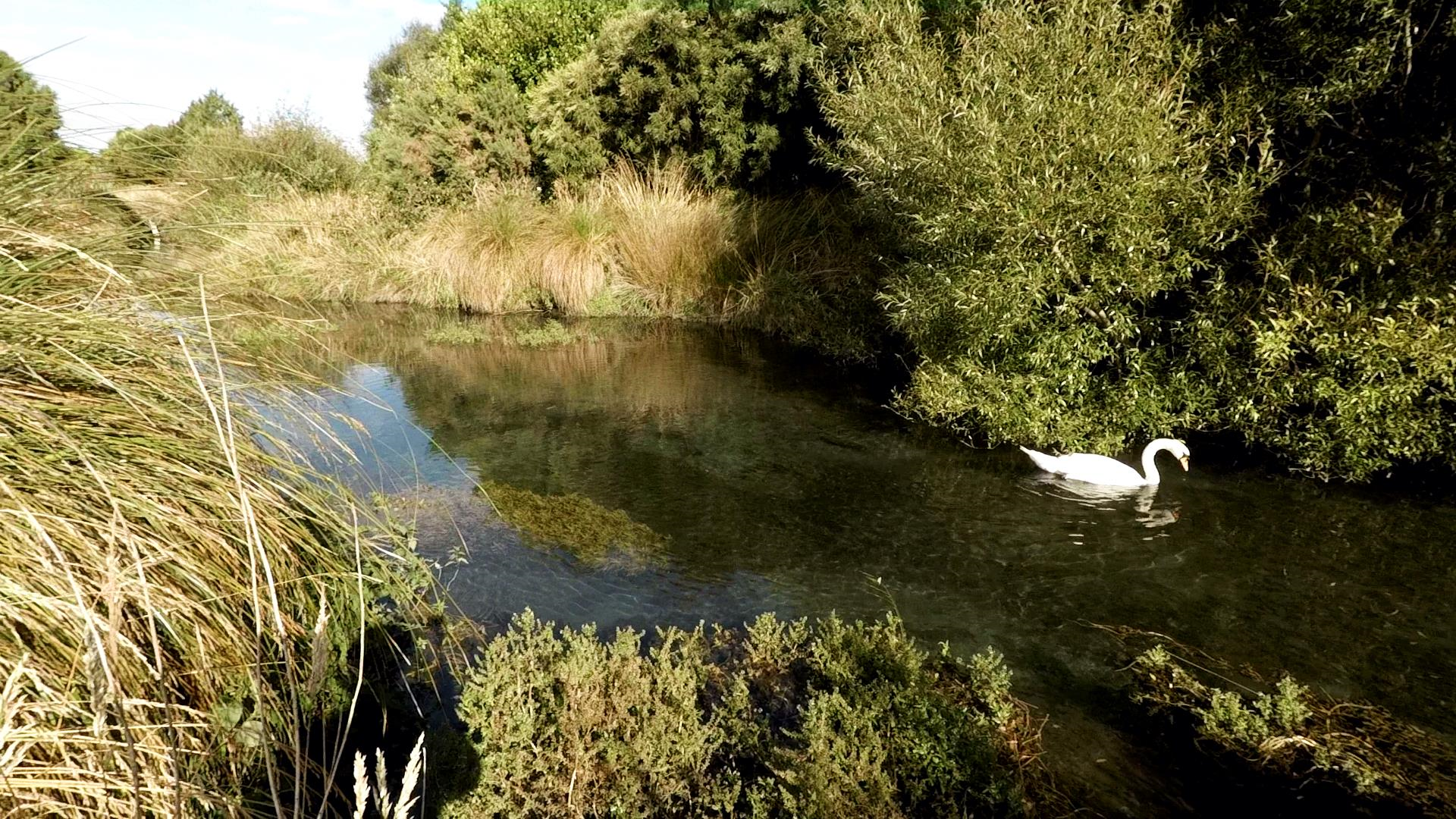
A rare White Swan feeding at Harts Creek

=== Harts Creek ===
Harts creek is a spring-fed creek and wildlife reserve located 7 minutes drive from Leeston and is a popular place for short walks, picnics, fly fishing and bird watching. Restoration projects have resulted in a wildlife reserve with some of the clearest waters in the Ellesmere District.

Bird life includes:

- mute swans
- black swans
- pūkeko
- parekareka/spotted shag
- Canada geese
- several species of duck
- kōtuku/white heron
- kakī/pied stilts
- kamana/crested grebe
- matuku/Australasian bittern

=== Ellesmere A&P Show ===
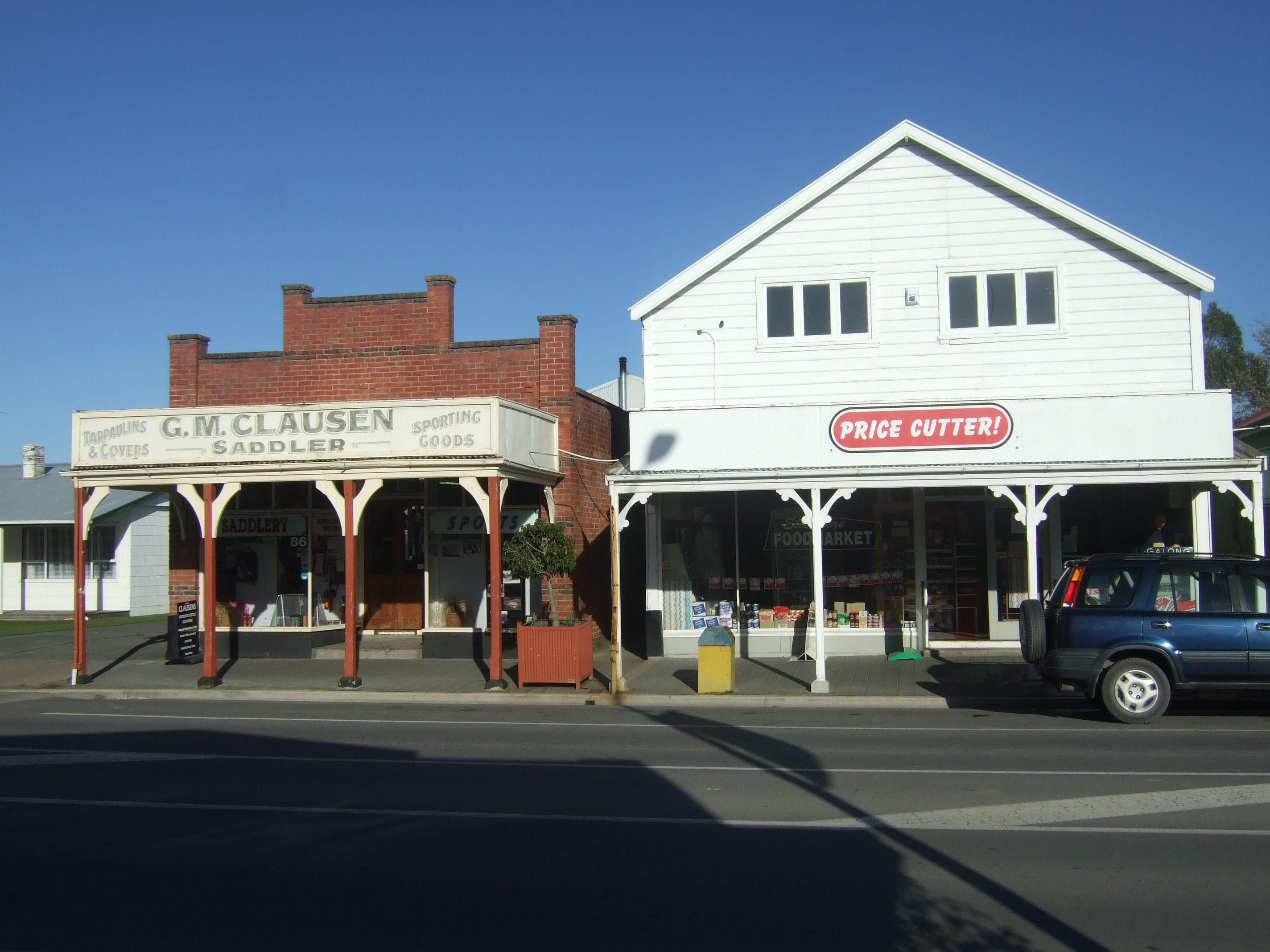
Shops on the main street

The Ellesmere A&P show is currently in its 147th year. It is held annually at the Leeston Agricultural and Pastoral Showgrounds. It is typically held in October and is one of the Selwyn Districts biggest events, attracting tens of thousands of visitors each year. Typical attractions include: farmyard displays, photography displays, craft stalls, sheep and wool displays, horse showing and jumping, dairy and beef cattle, wood chopping, trade displays, live music, vintage and modern machinery, dog trials, face painting, pony rides, shearing competitions, fair-ground rides, wine tasting, wearable arts and many more.

=== Camping ===
The Leeston District is home to three campsites, two situated on the banks of the Selwyn River, and one on the shores of Lake Ellesmere.

- Coes Ford Camp Ground: Camping is permitted for a maximum of 28 days and is free of charge. Coes Ford is a good spot for camping, fishing, picnics, casual recreation and conservation. Toilets are available but there is no drinking water. Coes Ford is available for camping all year round.
- Chamberlains Ford Camp Ground: This is a Selwyn District Council designated camping ground. Camping here is free – has a good waterhole for swimming. Toilets are available but there is no drinking water. Chamberlains Ford Camp Ground is available for camping all year round.
- Lakeside Domain Camp Ground: This camp site is situated on the shores of Lake Ellesmere, New Zealand's 5th largest lake. A spot for bird watching and recreational water sports. This is a free camp ground. Toilets are available but there is no drinking water.

=== Other activities ===
In May 2017, a community art gallery was opened in Leeston. It is Leeston's first art gallery.

Leeston is home to a variety of different sporting clubs and has a weekly running club each Wednesday evening. Sporting clubs in Leeston include: Rugby, Netball, Tennis, Lawn Bowls, Soccer, Cricket and Running. Leeston also has a fully equipped gym, which is open seven days a week from 4 a.m. to 11 p.m.

== Schools ==
Ellesmere College is a co-educational secondary school catering for years 7 to 13. It has a roll of 571 students as of July 2026. The school opened in 1981 to replace Southbridge District High School.

Leeston Consolidated School is a co-educational contributing primary school catering for years 1 to 6. It has a roll of 309 students (July 2026). It opened in 1865, and gained the name "Consolidated" in recognition of primary schools in Lakeside, Irwell, Doyleston and Brookside with which it amalgamated in the 1930s.

== Climate ==
Climate data for Leeston (1991–2020)
Month	Jan	Feb	Mar	Apr	May	Jun	Jul	Aug	Sep	Oct	Nov	Dec	Year
Mean daily maximum °C (°F)	23.7 (74.7)	23.7 (74.7)	21.1 (70.0)	18.0 (64.4)	15.4 (59.7)	12.2 (54.0)	11.9 (53.4)	13.2 (55.8)	15.6 (60.1)	18.1 (64.6)	20.1 (68.2)	22.2 (72.0)	17.9 (64.3)
Daily mean °C (°F)	17.6 (63.7)	17.6 (63.7)	15.5 (59.9)	12.5 (54.5)	10.1 (50.2)	7.1 (44.8)	6.7 (44.1)	8.0 (46.4)	10.1 (50.2)	12.2 (54.0)	14.0 (57.2)	16.3 (61.3)	12.3 (54.2)
Mean daily minimum °C (°F)	11.6 (52.9)	11.4 (52.5)	9.9 (49.8)	7.1 (44.8)	4.8 (40.6)	2.0 (35.6)	1.5 (34.7)	2.7 (36.9)	4.6 (40.3)	6.3 (43.3)	7.9 (46.2)	10.3 (50.5)	6.7 (44.0)
Average rainfall mm (inches)	45.8 (1.80)	39.2 (1.54)	46.7 (1.84)	55.5 (2.19)	63.7 (2.51)	68.2 (2.69)	52.3 (2.06)	55.5 (2.19)	43.9 (1.73)	45.3 (1.78)	42.7 (1.68)	51.3 (2.02)	610.1 (24.03)
Source: NIWA
