= George Ross (farmer) =

New Zealand farmer and local politician

Canterbury Provincial treasurer
- In office 1 April 1865 – January 1867
- Preceded by: George Sale

Canterbury Provincial Council (Rakaia electorate)
- In office 20 July 1858 – 24 July 1861
- Preceded by: Charles Haslewood
- Succeeded by: John Studholme
- In office 28 April 1862 – 1 April 1865
- Preceded by: John Studholme
- Succeeded by: Francis Stewart

Personal details
- Born: George Arthur Emilius Ross; 1829 England
- Died: 23 November 1876 (aged 48) Montreal Street, Christchurch Central City
- Resting place: St Peter's Church graveyard
- Spouse: Sibella Ross (née Wilson)
- Children: eight
- Occupation: Farmer, politician
- Portfolio: Provincial treasurer

George Arthur Emilius Ross (some sources say Aemilius, Æmilius, or Emileus; (Note: When Ross advertised using his full name, the spelling was "Emilius") 1829 – 23 November 1876) was a New Zealand farmer and provincial politician. A cultured and well-educated man, he suffered a breakdown while at Oxford University and relocated to Christchurch for health reasons before he finished his degree. After a short period as a cadet to learn the basics of sheep farming, he became a major land owner. He was an elected member of the Canterbury Provincial Council (1858–1861; 1862–1865) for the rural Rakaia electorate and was on the Canterbury Provincial Executive Council on a number of occasions (1859; 1863–1867) including nearly two years as provincial treasurer. Well-liked as an individual, he was chaotic as a businessman and went bankrupt after a harsh winter in 1867 that caused great loss of stock. He suffered a mental breakdown and disappeared from public life thereafter, with his young wife, Sibella, sustaining the family by running a school that her parents had financed for them. Ross died young aged 48 and his wife outlived him by five decades, bringing up a family of eight children by herself. The West Coast town of Ross was named after him during his lifetime.

== Early life ==
Ross was born in 1829 and baptised on 17 May of that year in Dorchester, Dorset, England. His parents were Edward Dalhousie Ross and Euphemia (née Fell). Ross studied at Oxford University but had a breakdown before he obtained his degree. To improve his health, he emigrated to Canterbury, New Zealand, on the Fatima and arrived at Lyttelton on 27 December 1851. He chose Canterbury as his mother's cousin, Rev. James Wilson, had emigrated to Christchurch earlier in 1851.

== Professional career ==
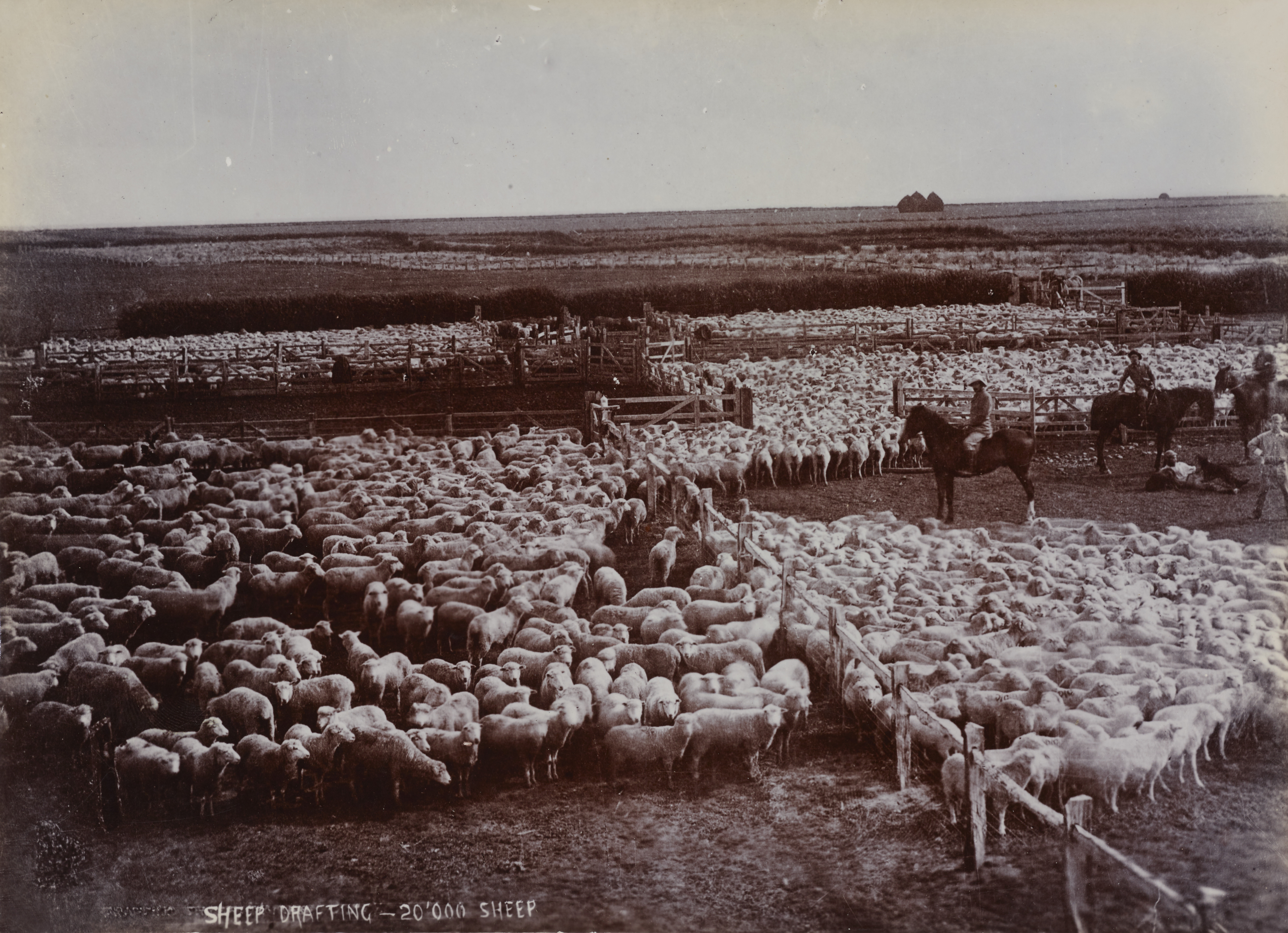
Sheep-drafting at Waireka Station in c. 1880

Ross went to Henry Tancred's Malvern Hills sheep station as a cadet. He soon became interested in local politics and in 1853 became the first clerk of the Canterbury Provincial Council. He held the position for five years until he became an elected member in July 1858. Ross was an original member of the Christchurch Club and stayed there (and used the club's address) when he was in Christchurch. Ross was well liked by others.

In 1854, Ross purchased his own station—Waireka Station—from the Macdonald brothers (William, Allen and Angus). A successful breeder, he increased sheep numbers from 1,300 in 1856 to 2,000 in 1858. Charles Harper (1838–1920), a son of bishop Henry Harper, became his business partner some time after 1860. Ross became the Canterbury Provincial Council's first clerk and Harper later managed Waireka Station by himself. They sold the station in c. 1862 to John Karslake Karslake and Thomas Anson. Ross also owned 700 acres (280 ha) of land at West Melton. From c. 1860, Ross and Harper bought the Lake Coleridge Station from Dr Alfred Barker and in 1864, they relocated the homestead that belonged to that run. Ross and Harper leased the Mt Fourpeaks and the Clayton stations and the associated sheep from Edward Louis Clogstoun and the Walker brothers (Lancelot and Sherbroke). A hard winter in 1867 ruined the leaseholders and they had to return the land to its owners. Ross and Harper lost much capital through their land speculation.

Ross's case was at court between October 1867 (for "sequestrating the estate of Mr Ross") and January 1868 (to resolve an injunction obtained by Ross's trustee). Ross was bankrupted in November 1867 and a trustee (James Edwin Graham) put in place to look after Ross's estates. Ross's homestead (Stoneycroft) and land near the Riccarton Race Course and his West Melton property were put up for auction by the mortgagee in October 1867. Ross had a mental breakdown and was too ill to attend the court hearings from November 1867 onwards. The partnership between Ross and Harper was dissolved in 1868. Peter Halkett, a fellow runholder and cousin who sometimes had business dealings with Ross wrote that he was "unbusinesslike and kept no books but trusted to notes and to his good memory".

After his bankruptcy, he and his family moved to his parents-in-law's property in Christchurch and his wife Sibella opened a boys' school to support the family. The land for the school, first a section on the corner of Peterborough and Montreal streets, and later a more central site on the corner of Gloucester and Montreal streets, was given to them by her parents. Ross had previously conducted the French examinations at Christ's College Grammar School. After his mental breakdown, nothing more was heard of Ross apart from some preaching. The family was supported by Sibella Ross through running the school.

== Political career ==
Waireka Station was located in the Rakaia electorate. On 22 May 1858, the incumbent—Charles Haslewood—died from an accident. Two weeks later on 5 June, Ross first advertised announcing himself as a candidate for the upcoming by-election, with the Lyttelton Times stating a week later that the election would be unlikely to be contested. As clerk of the provincial council, Ross was their returning officer and in that function, he advertised on 10 July officially announcing the by-election, with the nomination of candidates set for 20 July and, if needed, an election to be held the following day, with the woolshed of his station as the venue for the nomination meeting and as one of two polling booths. Ross was returned unopposed (Note: The Parliamentary Record records 20 July as the election date, which matches the day of the nomination meeting.) and it fell to the deputy returning officer—Theodore Blunt Keele—to announce the official result. Keele also succeeded Ross as clerk for the provincial council.

Ross was appointed to the tenth Canterbury Provincial Executive Council led by Richard James Strachan Harman on 8 November 1858, with his roles as Provincial Secretary and Keeper of the Public Records. The provincial secretary and provincial solicitor (taken by Charles Wyatt) were paid positions and as such, Ross and Wyatt had to resign with effect of 8 November, but they could stand for re-election. Before this by-election could proceed, the Executive Council resigned on 15 November. John Ollivier formed the eleventh Executive Council on 21 November 1859 and Ross was again appointed to it but without taking a formal office. This executive council lasted for one month until its resignation on 21 December 1859, triggered by Ross's resignation from the executive over a policy issue. Ross was not appointed to the twelfth executive council, but was re-elected. The nomination meeting was on 3 December 1859 at Waireka Station and a vote, if needed, was to be held two days later. A result of this by-election was not reported by the Lyttelton Times, but Guy Scholefield records Ross's re-election date as 26 December 1859. Ross remained a member of the provincial council until the end of the term on 24 July 1861, but did not stand in the next election in September 1861; he was succeeded in the Rakaia electorate by John Studholme.

Studholme retired at the end of the term in March 1862 and Ross stood for re-election to the fourth council in the Rakaia electorate. This time, the nomination meeting was held at another homestead—that of Richard Westenra—and Ross was returned unopposed on 28 April 1862. On 4 December 1863, the fifteenth Canterbury Provincial Executive Council was formed and Ross was appointed without office. With the West Coast gold rush underway, the existing treasurer of the provincial council—George Sale—was appointed warden for the West Coast. Ross was appointed his successor as treasurer effective 1 April 1865 and, given that it was a paid role, he resigned his membership of the provincial council on the same day. The representation of the Rakaia electorate was contested in the resulting by-election, with Francis Stewart defeating Edward Cephas John Stevens. The resignation of Ross as provincial treasurer was gazetted on 7 January 1867. (Note: Both standard works for the Canterbury Provincial Executive Council record the wrong end date for Ross. Scholefield, in his Parliamentary Record, records 1 April 1865, but that is when Ross resigned his council membership so that he could take on the role as treasurer for the executive. Wigram, in The Story of Christchurch, New Zealand, records Ross as last resigning from the executive council on 22 February 1865)

From January 1864, Ross was an original member of the West Avon Road Board. He was chairman of the East Rakaia (also known as Courtenay) Road Board until his resignation in mid-1865.

== Family ==
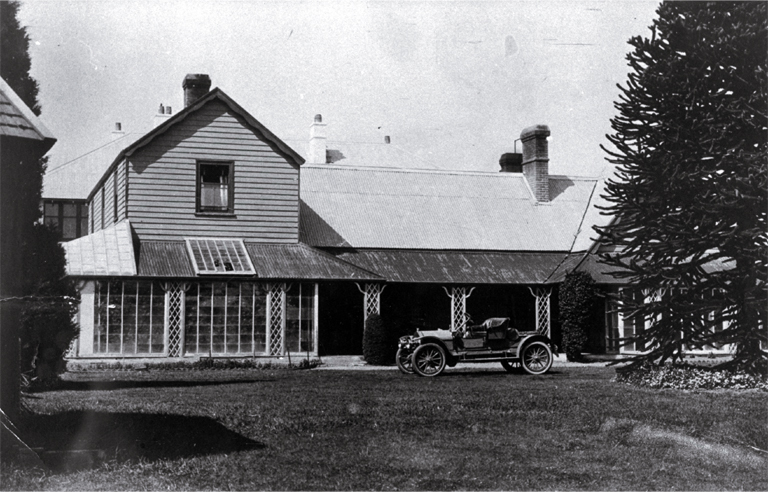
Stoneycroft in 1910

In December 1857 or December 1858 (sources differ), Ross became engaged to Sibella Wilson. Ross's mother and Sibella Wilson's paternal grandmother were sisters, and as Ross was recuperating from an illness the family had invited him to stay with them. Wilson's father was Rev. James Wilson (he became Archdeacon of Christchurch, from 1871 to 1874). On 2 March 1859, the couple were married at the Church of St Michael and All Angels in Christchurch. Ross was 30 years old and Wilson was 18. Charles Bowen (a member of the Provincial Council) and Cecilia Wilson (Sibella's younger sister) were witnesses. The newlyweds first lived at Waireka Station. The couple had eight children, four sons and four daughters. In 1863, Ross had a 13-room house built in what is now Hei Hei; he named the property Stoneycroft. After his bankruptcy, Halkett leased the house.

Cecilia Wilson married Charles Harper in July 1861, which made the business partners Harper and Ross brothers-in-law. Cecilia Harper died a little over a year later, aged 20, at Waireka from tuberculosis (then known as consumption). Sibella Euphemia Ross, one of his daughters, married Rev. Walter Harper in 1919; he was a younger brother of Charles Harper.

Ross died in central Christchurch on 23 November 1876; he was 48. He was buried in the cemetery of St Peter's Church in Upper Riccarton. His wife survived him by five decades and died in September 1929, still living in the building at 322 Montreal Street that used to be her school. The site is now occupied by the Christchurch Art Gallery. His wife is buried next to him; the adjacent grave is that of her parents.

== Commemoration ==
On 5 September 1866, the West Coast Times reported that the gold digging town previously known as Totara (itself named after the Totara River) had been renamed 'Ross' "for what reason we are not aware". In Place Names of New Zealand it is stated that the naming was done by James Mackay in honour of the then-treasurer of the Canterbury Province, George Ross. It was originally named as 'Rosstown' but this was soon shortened to 'Ross'.

Waireka Station homestead still exists and its location is marked on maps as "Waireka". It is located at 308 Waireka Road in Darfield adjacent to the Waianiwaniwa River, which during Ross's lifetime was known as the Waireka River. Stoneycroft homestead also still exists, but it is no longer the original house and the property is also known under other names (most commonly Hornby Lodge but also Morley's). Stoneycroft Lane is nearby.
