= Christina Gregg =

Christina Gregg may refer to:

- Christina Gregg (farmer) (1814 or 1815 – 1882), New Zealand farmer known for her involvement in a murder case
- Christina Gregg (actress) (born 1939), British actress and model
