= Nurse Maude =

Hospital matron, district nurse, social worker (1862–1935)

Nurse Maude OBE
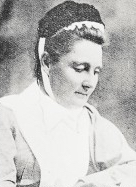
- Born: Sibylla Emily Maude; 11 August 1862; Christchurch, New Zealand
- Died: 12 July 1935 (aged 72); Christchurch, New Zealand
- Occupation: Nurse
- Known for: Establishment of district nursing service in Christchurch
- Parent: Emily Brown Thomas Maude

Sibylla Emily Maude OBE (11 August 1862 – 12 July 1935), known as Nurse Maude, was the founder of district nursing in New Zealand. She was loved for her selfless work for the poor, walking many miles each day in every kind of weather to treat those who could afford no medical help.

== Early life ==
Maude was born in Christchurch New Zealand, on 11 August 1862. She was the eldest of eight children born to Thomas Maude and Emily Brown. At the time of her birth, Thomas was a member of the provincial government, the Canterbury Provincial Council. In 1876, the family went to England and Maude attended Linden School in Blackheath, London for three years until their return to Christchurch in 1879.

As a child of a deeply religious family deeply involved with charitable work, she visited the poor and sick, and decided then that becoming a nurse would be the best way to help others.

== Career ==
In 1899, as most professional nurses in New Zealand at the time, Maude went to England to train as a nurse. She became a fee-paying "lady probationer" at Middlesex Hospital, England, where she spent four years. She returned to Christchurch in 1893 and took up the position of matron of Christchurch Hospital. During her time she oversaw the opening of a new nurses' home and the introduction of nursing training programmes. However Maude was frequently involved in debates with the hospital board and in 1895 a commission of inquiry was set up into her management of the hospital. She was cleared of all charges, but the experience left Maude convinced that she was not suited to institutional management.

In November 1896 Maude began her district nursing work. She based her work on the English model of providing nursing services to the sick poor in their own homes, but was also inspired by the sisters of the recently established Deaconess Institution, who combined nursing services with in-home parish visits. She worked from premises in Durham Street, dispensing medicines and treating those who were able to travel to see her. In her first year, she also made over 1,100 home visits, all on foot, often carrying pans for her patients to use for cooking or washing. Funding was provided by local philanthropist Lady Heaton Rhodes.

In March 1901, the Nurse Maude District Nursing Association was formed, and a committee of volunteers took over the task of organising financial support. Some local parishes contributed funds, and street appeals were held to raise money for substantial projects such as a new building. As funding allowed, more nurses were employed, and services were extended. Local business people provided the service with horses and buggies and bicycles for the nurses' rounds, and Nurse Maude was given a car.

Nurse Maude's services went beyond physical nursing. Nurses provided clothing and food as needed, and visits began with prayers. She also believed in the importance of education, and in 1917 began a series of lectures on home nursing and childcare in collaboration with the local branch of the Mothers' Union. In addition, she responded to epidemics as needed – with two camps for tuberculosis patients in 1904 and 1905, and by organising services for influenza victims in the 1918 flu pandemic. In 1908, she extended her services to the recently deceased, agreeing to prepare bodies at the public morgue for burial.

In 1919, a two-storey building was built on Madras Street for the association by Sir Heaton and Lady Rhodes. Nurse Maude moved into the upstairs flat and lived there til her death, and the association used the building until 1973.

Shortly before she died Maude accepted a small recognition of her life's work and was appointed Officer of the Order of the British Empire (OBE) in the 1934 New Year Honours, for services in connection with district nursing. At her request, the award was presented in a private ceremony.

== Death ==
On her death, Maude's body lay in state at Christ Church Cathedral, where her memorial service was held. City streets were lined with hundreds of mourners as her funeral procession passed by on its way to St. Peter's Church in Upper Riccarton. She was buried in the churchyard there, in her nurse's uniform.

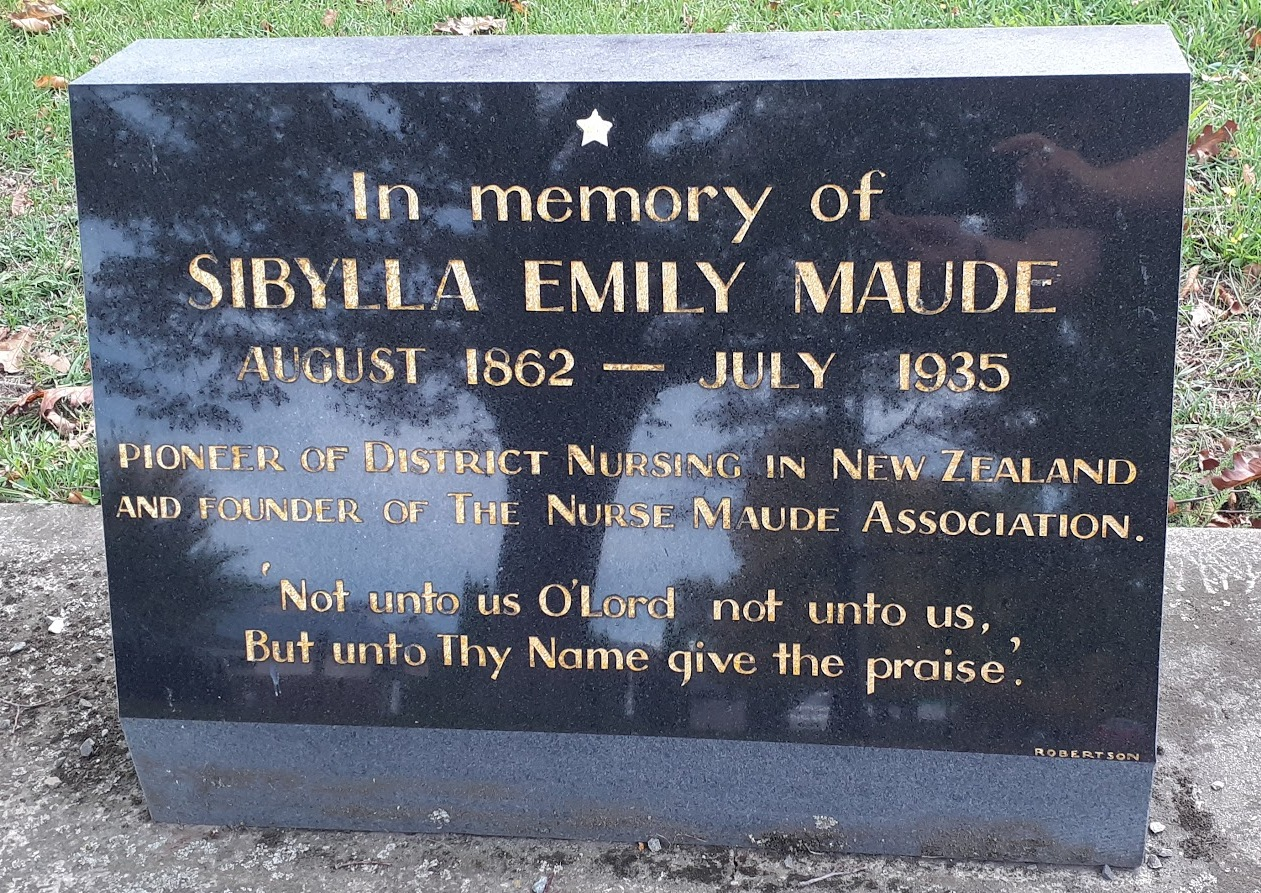
Gravestone of Nurse Maude, St Peter's Church, Riccarton

== Legacy ==
The nursing organisation she established is still in operation. It is staffed by 1,500 people, paid and unpaid, and provides district nursing, in-home care and palliative hospice care in the Canterbury, Kaikoura and West Coast regions of New Zealand's South Island.

There are two stained glass windows which commemorate Maude's life and work – one in the former chapel of Christchurch Hospital (now the Christchurch Nurses' Memorial Chapel), and one in the chapel of the Community of the Sacred Name (formerly the Deaconess Institution).

A marble bust of Maude stands in the foyer of the Nurse Maude Hospital.
