= Sibella Ross =

New Zealand schoolteacher and businesswoman

Sibella Mary Ross (née Wilson; 1840 – 7 September 1929) was a New Zealand schoolteacher and businesswoman. She established Ross House, a preparatory school for boys, in Christchurch in 1869.

== Biography ==
Ross was the eldest of five daughters of Reverend (later Archdeacon) James Wilson and Sibella Anne Wilson (née Morison). She was born in England and baptised at Ashton-on-Ribble, Lancashire, on 31 May 1840. The family emigrated to New Zealand in 1851, arriving at Lyttelton on the Isabella Hercules in March. Her parents established a farm at St Martins in Christchurch.

When she was 18 years old she met George Ross, a Canterbury provincial councillor. George's mother and Sibella's father were cousins, and as George was recuperating from an illness the family had invited him to stay with them. George and Sibella became engaged in December 1858. They were married on 2 March 1859 at Christchurch, and moved to George's rural property, Waireka Station, a six-hour ride west of Christchurch. In 1862 they sold the property and bought Lake Coleridge Station, and also took over the leases of three other stations.

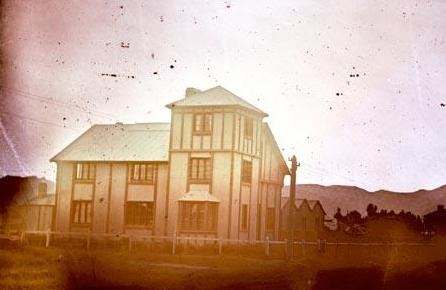
Ross House, the school and boarding house operated by Sibella Ross; this is now the site of the Christchurch Art Gallery

In 1867, a massive snowstorm ruined the farming stations that the Rosses owned and leased. George Ross was declared bankrupt and had a mental and physical breakdown; at the time, the couple had seven children aged under 10 years old. The family moved to live with Ross' parents at their property in Upper Riccarton, Christchurch. Her father purchased land on the corner of Montreal and Peterborough Streets and built a small building which Ross used to establish a boys' school. In February 1869, she opened Ross House, a boys' preparatory school (most boys went on to Christ's College), enrolling both day pupils and boarders, and also took in boarders attending other schools. The school was successful and in 1871 Ross' father purchased a larger plot of land and re-located the school and dormitories to the corner of Montreal and Gloucester Streets. One of her pupils was the mountaineer Guy Mannering.

George Ross died in November 1876, leaving Ross with four sons and four daughters, all adolescents. She continued to manage the school and retired in 1883. After retirement, she continued to earn an income by taking in boarders.

Ross died at her home on 7 September 1929, aged 89. She was buried at St Peter's Church, Riccarton. Ross House was sold to Canterbury College, as the university wanted to build a new art school. When the university decided to move to a new campus at Ilam, those plans fell through and the site became tennis courts for Christchurch Girls' High School instead; the girls' school was diagonally opposite on Montreal Street at the time. These days, the site of Ross House is occupied by the Christchurch Art Gallery.
