= Ellesmere, New Zealand =

Coordinates: 43°39′50″S 172°21′24″E

Ellesmere is a locality in the Selwyn District of New Zealand.

Located south of Rolleston, the locality has given its names to a number of features. Ellesmere ward is a large rural area within Selwyn District; two of Selwyn's ten district councillors are elected in that ward. Lake Ellesmere / Te Waihora, Canterbury's largest lake, is located south of Ellesmere. The Anglican Church has a parish called Ellesmere, and Walter Harper was its vicar from 1876 to 1882. The parliamentary Ellesmere electorate existed from 1861 to 1928.
