= Walter Harper (priest) =

Walter Harper (12 January 1848 – 6 January 1930) was Dean of Christchurch from 1901 until 1913.

Harper was born on 12 January 1848 at Stratfield Mortimer, Berkshire, England. He was the fourteenth child of Henry Harper, a former Bishop of Christchurch, and Emily Harper (née Wooldridge). His parents emigrated to Christchurch in New Zealand on the Egmont, arriving in Lyttelton on 23 December 1856. Harper received his education at Christ's College, Christchurch (1857–1868) in Christchurch, and Trinity College, Oxford; and ordained in 1873. After a curacy in Bebington he was Vicar of Ellesmere then Christchurch. He was principal of the Upper Department at Christ's College, Christchurch and sub-dean of Christchurch Cathedral from 1893 until 1900.

On 13 July 1875, Harper married Emily Hope at St Andrew's Church in Bebington, Merseyside, England. They had a son and a daughter. His wife died on 27 September 1880 at the parsonage in Southbridge aged 35. On 23 January 1919, Harper married Sibella Ross at St John the Baptist Church in Christchurch. She was the daughter of George Ross.

Harper died on 6 January 1930 at Christchurch and was buried at Barbadoes Street Cemetery. His second wife died in 1934. His daughter Emily first married Hugh Maude Reeves and, after Reeves' death, she married his business partner Leopold George Dyke Acland.
