= William Sinclair-Burgess =

Senior officer in the New Zealand Military Forces

Sir William Sinclair-Burgess
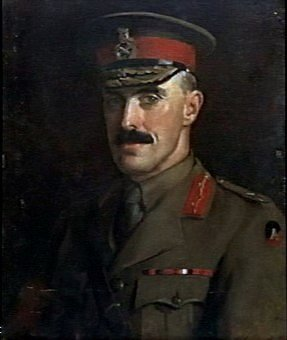
- Major General Sir William Livingston Hatchwell Sinclair-Burgess
- Born: 18 February 1880; Longsight, England
- Died: 3 April 1964 (aged 84); Wellington, New Zealand
- Military career
- Allegiance: New Zealand
- Branch: New Zealand Military Forces; Australian Imperial Force
- Service years: 1898–1937
- Rank: Major General
- Commands: New Zealand Military Forces (1931–37); Commander, Royal Artillery 4th Australian Division (1917–18); 3rd Australian Field Artillery Brigade (1916–17); 9th (Tasmanian) Battery (1915)
- Conflicts: First World War; Gallipoli campaign; Western Front
- Awards: Knight Commander of the Order of the British Empire; Knight Bachelor; Companion of the Order of the Bath; Companion of the Order of St Michael and St George; Distinguished Service Order; Mentioned in Despatches (6); Legion of Honour (France); Distinguished Service Medal (United States)

Major General Sir William Livingston Hatchwell Sinclair-Burgess, KBE, CB, CMG, DSO (18 February 1880 – 3 April 1964) was a senior officer in the New Zealand Military Forces.

Born in England, his family moved to New Zealand in the 1890s. He became a professional soldier in the New Zealand Military Forces in 1911. In Australia on an exchange with the Australian Army when the First World War broke out, he was attached to the Australian Imperial Force. He served in the Gallipoli campaign and on the Western Front in a series of artillery commands. During the war, he was awarded the Distinguished Service Order, mentioned in despatches six times and was one of only 14 personnel of the New Zealand Military Forces to receive the French Legion of Honour. Returning to New Zealand after the war, he later served as Commandant of the New Zealand Military Forces from 1931 until his retirement in 1937. He died in 1964 at the age of 84.

== Early life ==
William Livingston Hatchwell Sinclair was born on 18 February 1880 in Longsight, Manchester, England, to a shipping merchant, Archibald Sinclair, and his wife, Eliza Maria née Sandford. His parents divorced when he was a child, and when his mother remarried, he took on his stepfather's surname, Burgess. His stepfather, George Burgess, was a minister of a Congregational church and immigrated to New Zealand with his family in the 1890s.

== Military career ==
Burgess joined the New Zealand Volunteer Forces in 1898. He initially served with the South Canterbury Mounted Rifles in Timaru and then in 1902 was transferred the New Zealand Regiment of Field Artillery Volunteers, based in Auckland. He was commissioned in 1906, and was promoted to captain three years later. In 1911, he joined the New Zealand Permanent Forces, the precursor to the New Zealand Military Forces. As one of the first officers in the newly formed New Zealand Staff Corps, he served as adjutant of the 16th (Waikato) Regiment. He also commanded No. 4 Area Group in Hamilton.

=== World War I ===
In late 1913 Burgess was sent to Tasmania on exchange with the Australian Military Forces. When the First World War broke out in August 1914, he joined the Australian Imperial Force (AIF) rather than returning to New Zealand to volunteer for the New Zealand Expeditionary Force. He embarked for the Middle East with the 3rd Australian Field Artillery Brigade on 20 October 1914 aboard the P&O liner Geelong.

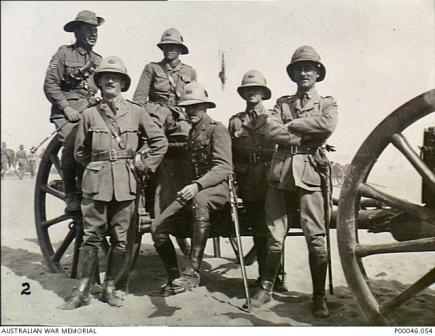
Group portrait of officers of the 9th Battery, 3rd Field Artillery Brigade, including Major Burgess, seated in centre. Middle East, March 1915

During the Gallipoli campaign, Burgess, now a major, commanded the 9th (Tasmanian) Battery. However, the guns of his battery were not landed until early May 1915. He and his men took over the guns of 7th Battery, allowing its personnel some rest. On 5 May, while reporting the location of Turkish artillery positions to his commander, Colonel Charles Rosenthal, he was wounded by shelling. His injuries required hospital treatment but he returned to the front on 17 May. Eventually poor health led to his evacuation from Gallipoli in October 1915. For his services during the campaign, he was awarded the Distinguished Service Order. Promoted to lieutenant colonel in March 1916 and given command of the 3rd Australian Field Artillery Brigade, he served on the Western Front.

Burgess particularly distinguished himself in action from July to September 1916 during the Battle of the Somme and was awarded the Croix de Officier of France's highest order, the Légion d’honneur (Legion of Honour) in May 1917. Burgess was one of only 14 members of the New Zealand Military Forces to be decorated with the Legion of Honour during the war.

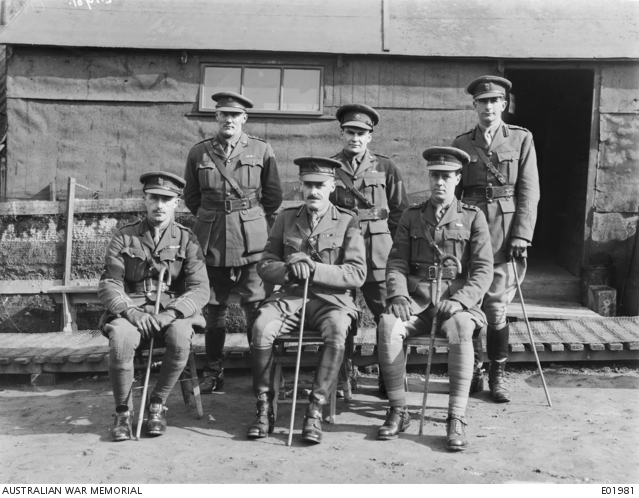
Group portrait of headquarters details of the 4th Australian Divisional Field Artillery, Belgium, March 1918. Seated in the centre of the front row is Brigadier General W. L. H. Burgess, the divisional artillery commander.

In 1917, Burgess was promoted to temporary brigadier general and appointed Commander, Royal Artillery of the 4th Australian Division. He served in this capacity for the remainder of the war, by the end of which he had been mentioned in despatches six times. He received a number of honours, including being made a Companion of the Order of the Bath and a Companion of the Order of St Michael and St George. He also received the Distinguished Service Medal from the government of the United States, having been attached to the 27th Division for a time. He was discharged from the AIF on 18 July 1919.

=== Post-war career ===
Burgess returned to New Zealand, and resumed his career with the New Zealand military with the rank of lieutenant colonel. He was an artillery officer at the Wellington Military District headquarters, in Palmerston North. He married in 1921, which was when he first adopted the additional surname Sinclair, his biological father's name. However, he did not begin formally using his new surname until 1926. In 1922, Burgess was posted to New Zealand Military Forces headquarters in Wellington as a staff officer. Two years later, he became director of 'Military intelligence and training' for three months before being promoted to colonel and appointed Chief of the General Staff.

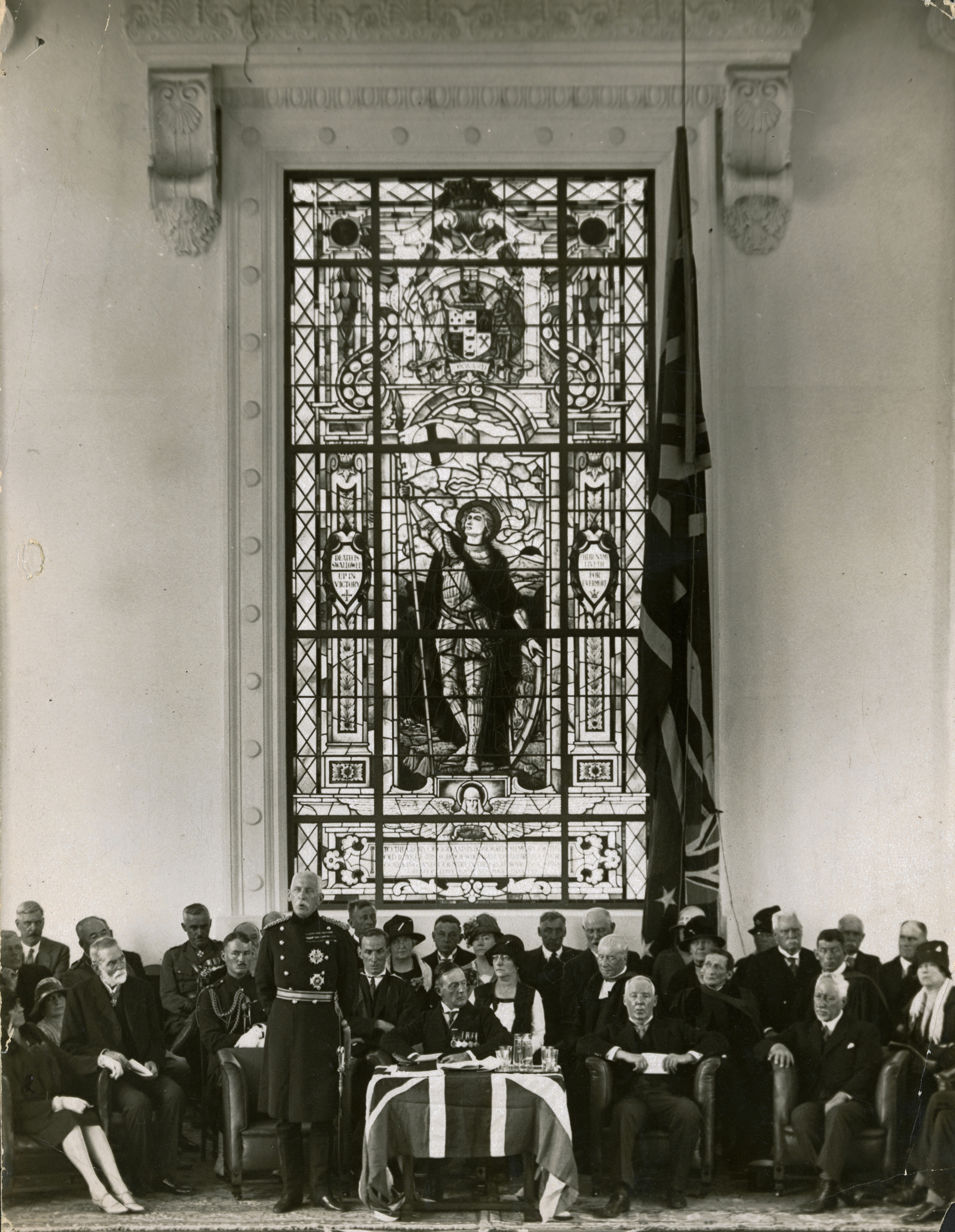
Sinclair-Burgess (3rd from left back row) at the opening of the Memorial Hall, Wellington College 1928

Promoted to brigadier in 1928, Burgess became Commandant of the New Zealand Military Forces, a position now known as the Chief of Army, in 1931 for a four-year term. The country's economic difficulties made his appointment a difficult one. The depression had resulted in New Zealand's compulsory military training scheme being abolished and the Territorial Force needed to be reorganised accordingly.

Burgess, now a major general, also implemented a rearmament program in response to increased aggression by the Empire of Japan in China and made a number of recommendations to the New Zealand government. Some recommendations, such as the purchase of aircraft (which led to the establishment of the Royal New Zealand Air Force) and artillery for harbour defences, were enacted. Others, such as the proposal for an infantry battalion and artillery battery be formed for service in British India, were not. He was also an advocate for the mechanisation of the New Zealand Military Forces. He was made a Knight Bachelor in the 1934 New Year Honours, and a Knight Commander of the Order of the British Empire in the 1935 King's Birthday Honours, the same year his term as Commandant of the New Zealand Military Forces was extended for two years. In 1935, he was also awarded the King George V Silver Jubilee Medal.

== Later life ==
Sinclair-Burgess retired from the military in 1937, having served six years as Commandant of the New Zealand Military Forces. On his retirement, the position was abolished. Following the outbreak of the Second World War he offered his services to the New Zealand government but this was turned down despite the enthusiasm of Edward Puttick, the Chief of Staff at the time. A carpenter in his youth, he built a house for himself at Mahina Bay, near Wellington. It was destroyed in a fire in 1959, along with all his belongings. Army officers raised the money to replace his medals and insignia.

He died at Eastborne, Wellington, on 3 April 1964. His marriage had ended in divorce several years earlier, and he had no children. He is buried in the servicemen's section of Wellington's Karori Cemetery.

== Notes ==
Military offices
Preceded by Major General Robert Young	Commandant of New Zealand Military Forces; April 1931 – March 1937	Succeeded by Major General Sir John Duigan; As Chief of the General Staff
