= Mount Mannering (New Zealand) =

Mountain in New Zealand

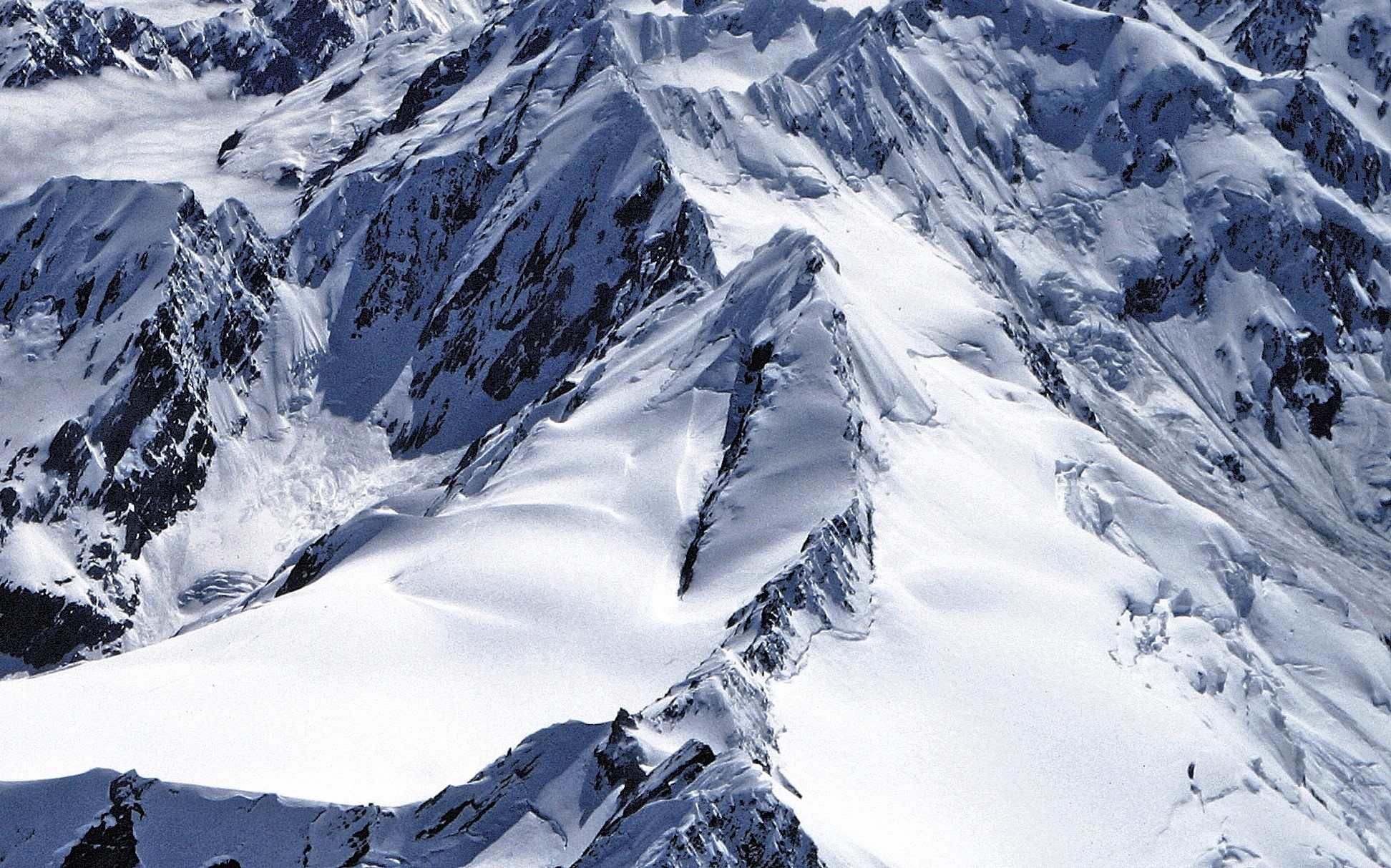
- Southwest aspect, centred

Highest point
- Elevation: 2,669 m (8,757 ft)
- Prominence: 446 m (1,463 ft)
- Isolation: 4.61 km (2.86 mi)
- Listing: New Zealand #26
- Coordinates: 43°29′13″S 170°24′40″E

Naming
- Etymology: Guy Mannering

Geography
- Location within New Zealand
- Interactive map of Mount Mannering
- Location: South Island
- Country: New Zealand
- Region: Canterbury / West Coast
- Protected area: Aoraki / Mount Cook National Park
- Parent range: Southern Alps
- Topo map(s): NZMS260 I35; Topo50 BX16

Climbing
- First ascent: 1914

Mount Mannering is a 2,669-metre-elevation (8,757-foot) mountain in New Zealand.

== Description ==
Mount Mannering is situated on the crest or Main Divide of the Southern Alps and on the boundary of Aoraki / Mount Cook National Park. It is located 193 kilometres (120 mi) west of the city of Christchurch and set on the common boundary shared by the Canterbury and West Coast Regions of the South Island. Precipitation runoff from the mountain drains west into the Whataroa River and east to the Godley River. Topographic relief is significant as the summit rises 1,270 metres (4,167 feet) above the Classen Glacier in one kilometre. The nearest higher neighbour is Mount Aylmer, four kilometres to the southwest. This mountain's toponym honours the well-known New Zealand mountaineer Guy Mannering (1862–1947), who began climbing in the mountains about 1883. The first ascent of the summit was made on 7 March 1914 by Otto Frind and Conrad Kain.

== Climbing ==
Climbing routes on Mount Mannering:

- South West Ridge – Otto Frind, Conrad Kain – (1914)
- East Rib – Keith McNaughton, John Gamlen – (1967)
- West Face – Dave Bamford, John Nankervis, Grant Stotter, Richard Hancock – (1977)

== Climate ==
Based on the Köppen climate classification, Mount Mannering is located in a marine west coast (Cfb) climate zone, with a tundra climate at the summit. Prevailing westerly winds blow moist air from the Tasman Sea onto the mountains, where the air is forced upward by the mountains (orographic lift), causing moisture to drop in the form of rain or snow. This climate supports the Classen Glacier and small unnamed glaciers on this mountain's slopes. The months of December through February offer the most favourable weather for viewing or climbing this peak.

== See also ==
- List of mountains of New Zealand by height

== Gallery ==
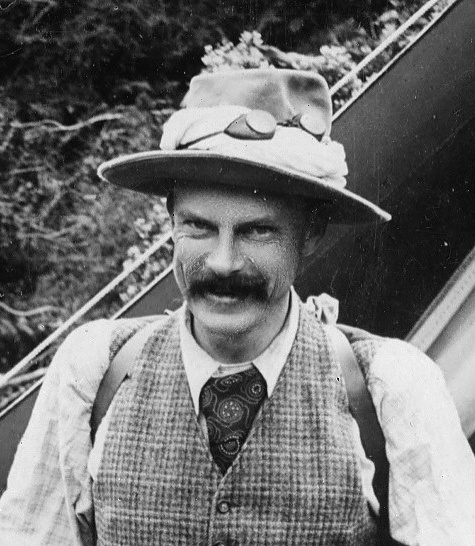
George Edward "Guy" Mannering in 1895

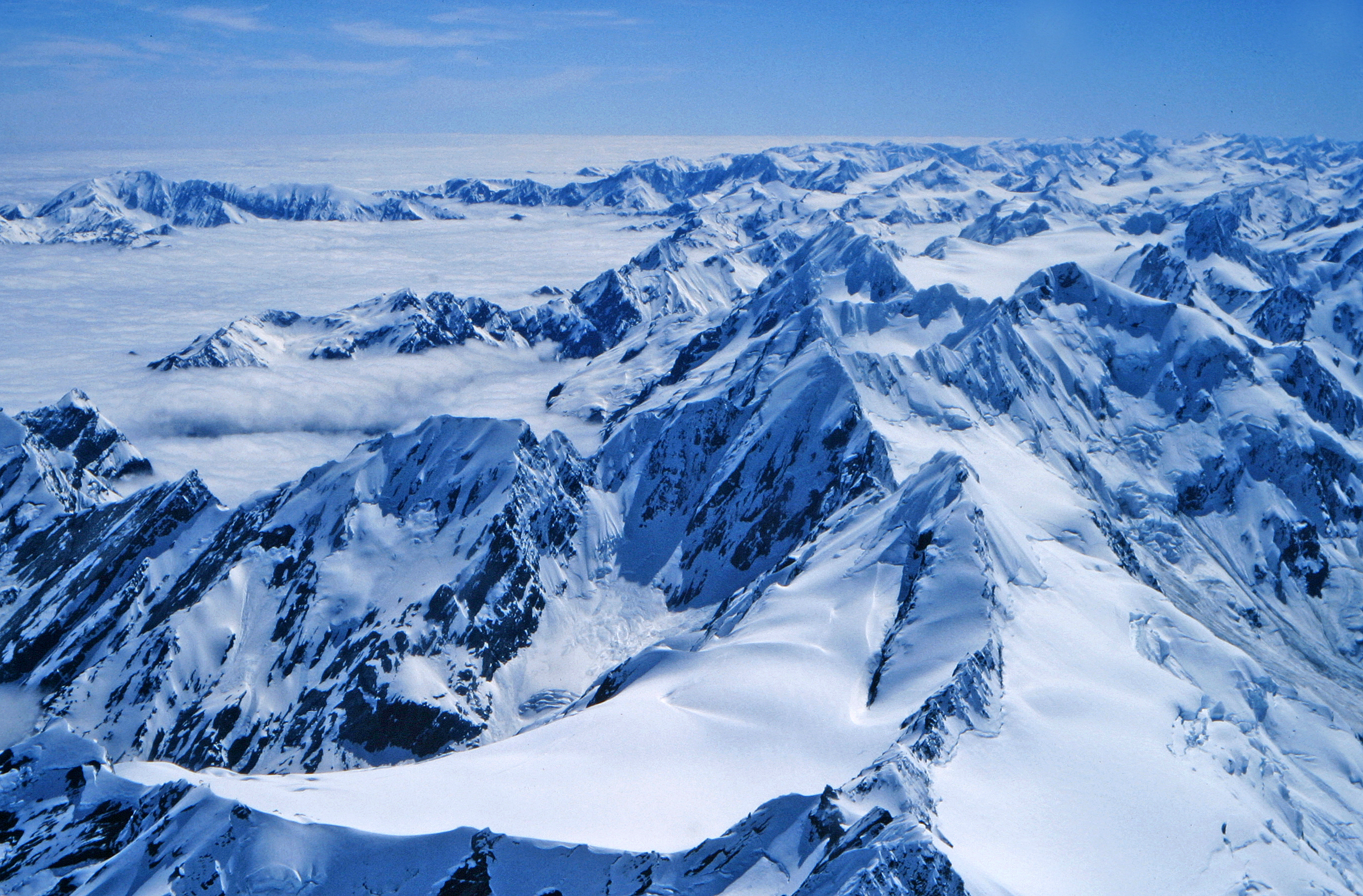
Mount Mannering at lower right

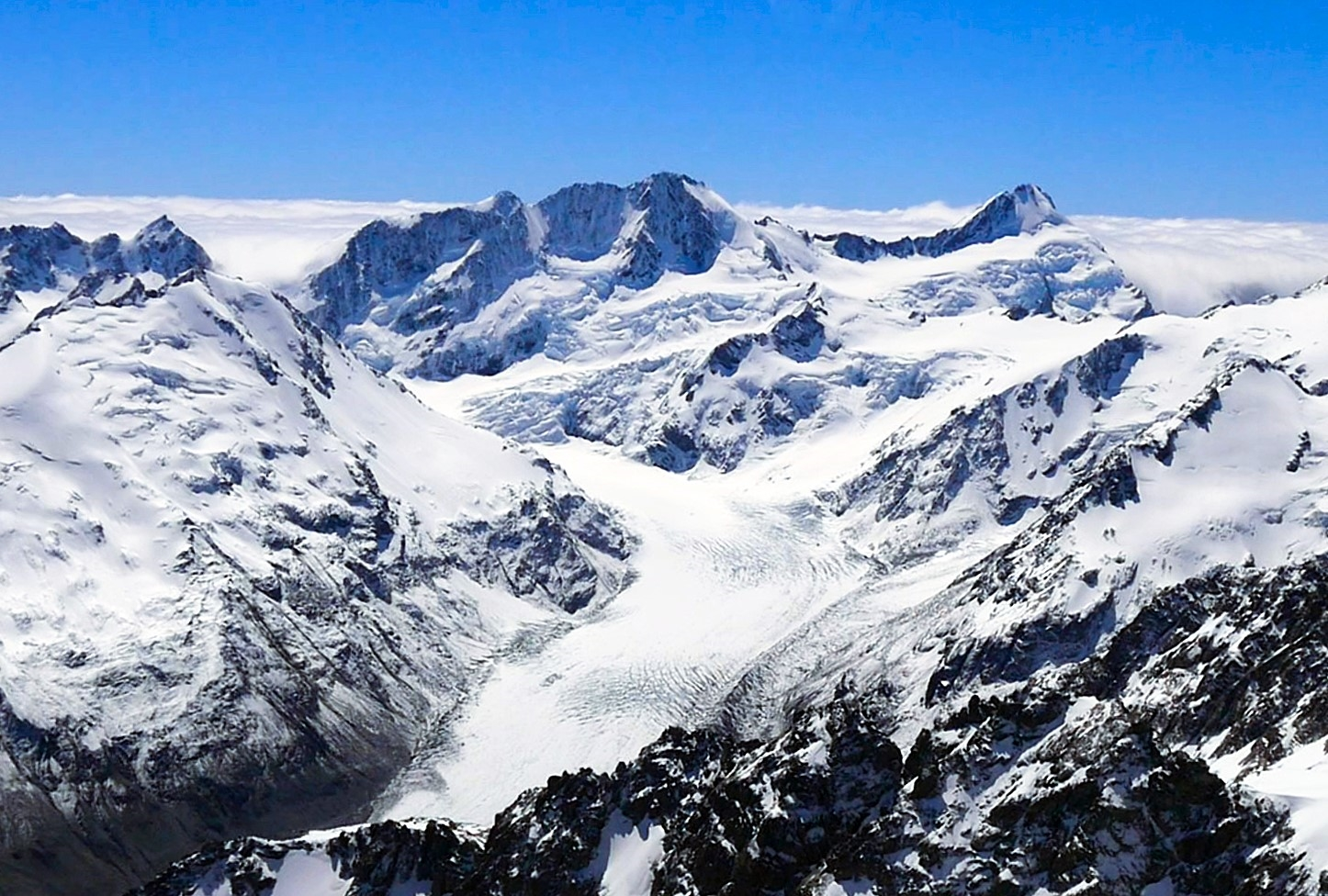
South aspect of Brodrick Peak centred, Mount Mannering to right
