= 1934 New Year Honours (New Zealand) =

Annual awards for New Zealanders

The 1934 New Year Honours in New Zealand were appointments by King George V to various orders and honours to reward and highlight good works by New Zealanders. The awards celebrated the passing of 1933 and the beginning of 1934, and were announced on 1 January 1934.

The recipients of honours are displayed here as they were styled before their new honour.

== Knight Bachelor ==
- James Trevilly Grose – of Wellington; general manager of the National Bank of New Zealand. For public services.
- Major-General William Livingstone Hatchwell Sinclair-Burgess CB CMG DSO ADC – general officer commanding New Zealand Military Forces.
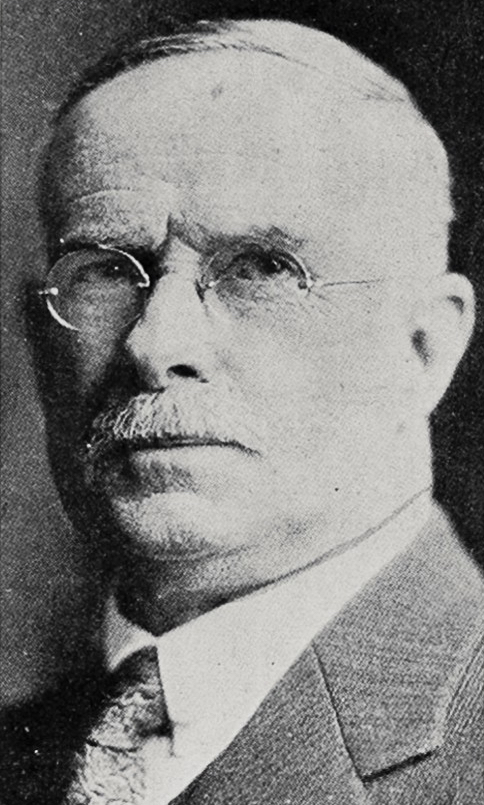
Sir James Grose

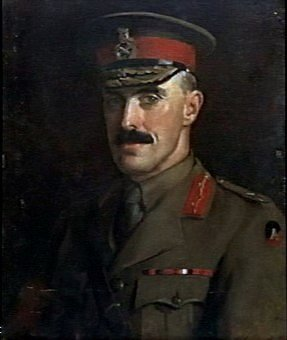
Sir William Sinclair-Burgess

== Order of Saint Michael and Saint George ==
=== Companion (CMG) ===
- Professor Robert Edward Alexander – director of Canterbury Agricultural College, Lincoln.
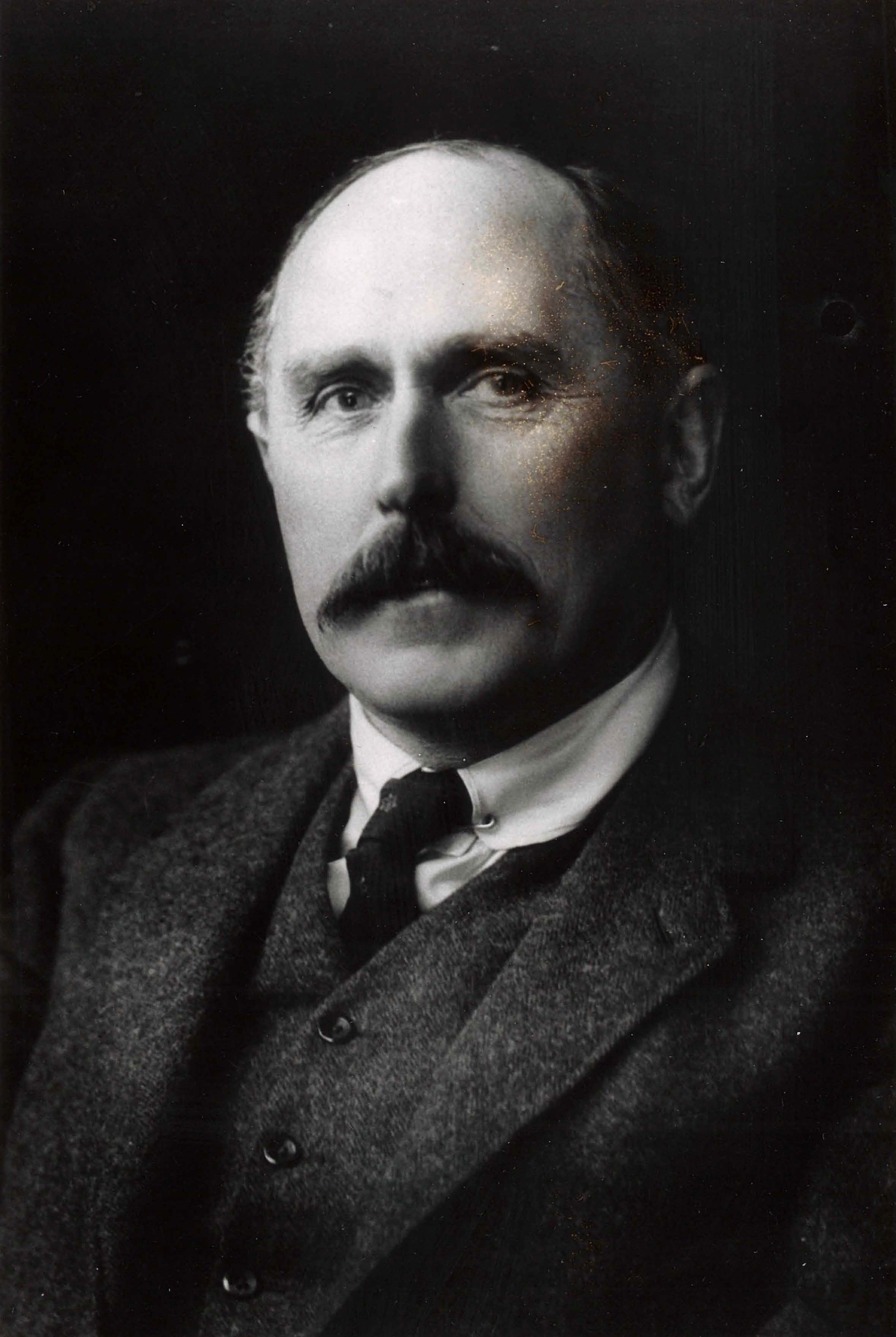
Robert Alexander

== Order of the British Empire ==
=== Commander (CBE) ===
Civil division

- Charles Albert Knowles – private secretary to successive high commissioners for New Zealand in London.

=== Officer (OBE) ===
Civil division

- Sibylla Emily Maude – of Christchurch. For services in connection with district nursing.
- Jane Anna Mowbray – of Auckland; president of the Auckland branch of the Victoria League.
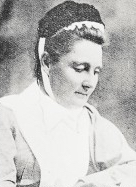
Nurse Maude
