= Christchurch Club =

New Zealand historic private members' club

Coordinates: 43°31′52.23″S 172°38′29.65″E

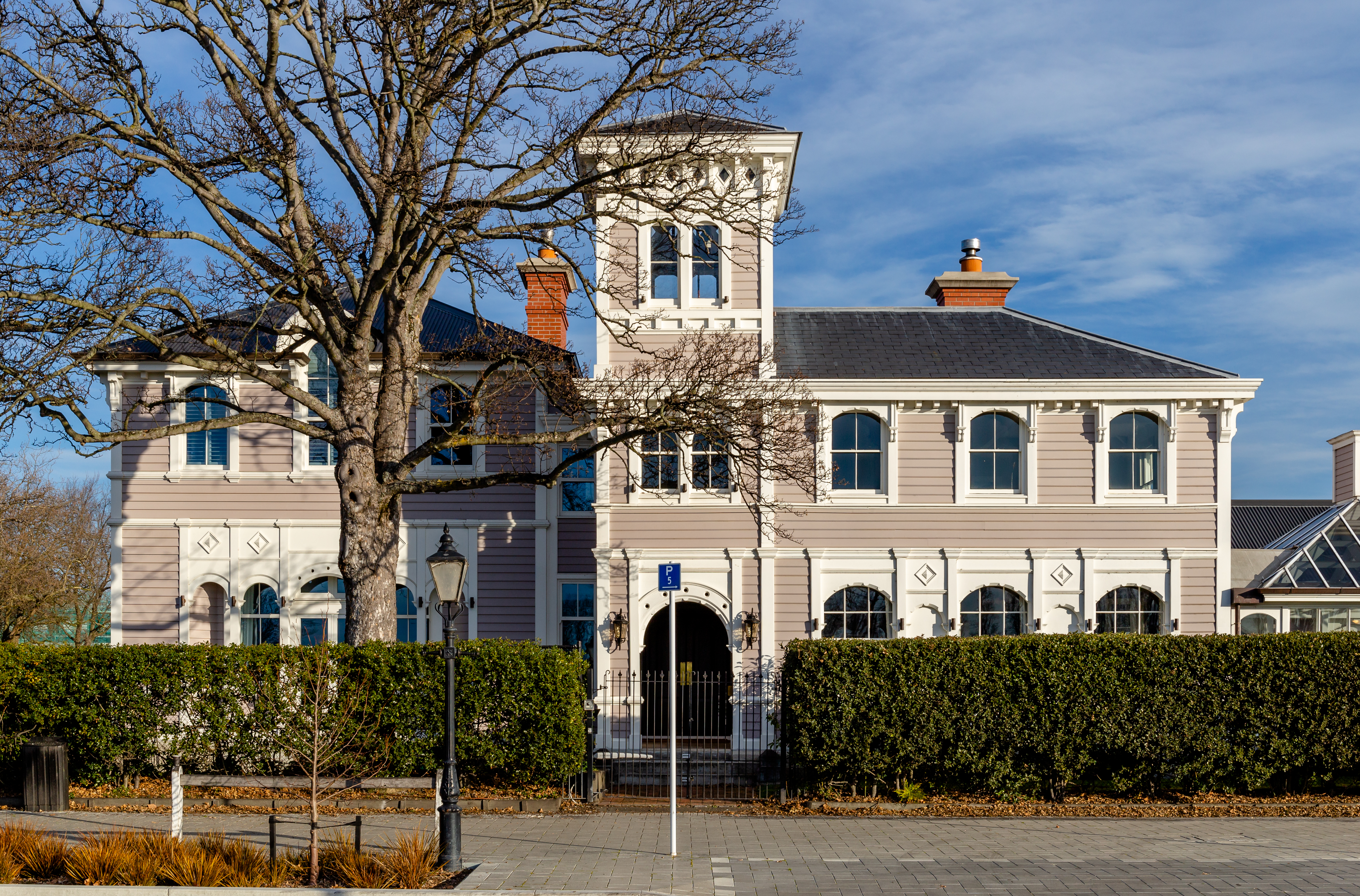
The Christchurch Club building in 2019

The Christchurch Club is a historic private members' club in the central city of Christchurch, New Zealand. The older of the two Christchurch clubs, it was founded by rural landholders in 1856; the rival organisation, the Canterbury Club, was a breakaway that was founded by urban professionals in 1872.

The Christchurch Club, originally simply known as The Club, was founded by wealthy runholders in 1856. George Ross was one of the founding members. At first, premises were rented in Durham Street for members who were visiting Christchurch to use. Benjamin Mountfort, Christchurch's pre-eminent architect, was engaged to design the club's building for the site adjacent to Latimer Square on Worcester Street. The design is unusual and unique for Mountfort, and is thought to be a compromise between an Italian Palazzo architecture preferred by the club members that can be found in the Travellers and Reform Clubs in London, and Mountfort's preference for a Gothic architecture. The chosen Italian Villa style was seen as relatively informal yet elegant and rural. The building was erected in 1861–62. Due to the composition of its membership, the Christchurch Club was "an informal seat of power in nineteenth century Canterbury". The building was registered by the New Zealand Historic Places Trust (since renamed to Heritage New Zealand) on 2 April 1985 as a Category I historic place.

The Christchurch Club building suffered significant damage in the 2010 and 2011 earthquakes, and as of April 2016 operates out of the George Hotel while the historic premises are under repair. There have been a number of attempts over the decades for the two Christchurch clubs to merge again, and the last such proposal was discussed in 2013.

== See also ==
- List of oldest buildings in Christchurch
