= Christina Gregg (farmer) =

Christina Gregg (née Ferguson) was a New Zealand farmer known for her involvement in a murder case. She was born in Scotland in 1814 or 1815. She was the daughter of John Ferguson, a carpenter, and his wife, Helen. She married quarryman James Gregg on 8 October 1834, in the parish of East Kilbride, Lanarkshire, Scotland.

== Emigration to New Zealand ==
On 4 November 1842 Christina and James Gregg arrived in Nelson, New Zealand. Nothing is known of their life in New Zealand until 1849, by which time they had travelled to Canterbury and were living in Lyttelton. Their only son, James, was born two years later. In 1857 James Gregg began farming land he had purchased at Riccarton, and by the following year was employing a farm labourer, Edmund Langstreth. James Gregg was described as "a singular specimen of a colonist; shrewd, industrious, comical, and extremely independent".

== James Gregg's death ==
James Gregg died at his Riccarton farm on 11 October 1859 after a brief but violent illness. An inquest held at the Plough Inn, Riccarton, heard that Gregg had been in good health on the evening of 10 October but during the night was seized with "violent vomiting and purging". Christina Gregg called on Langstreth, who lived in the farmhouse with the family, for assistance, and he went to fetch the doctor from Christchurch. On his arrival the doctor considered the case to be hopeless. A post-mortem analysis of the contents of Gregg's stomach showed the presence of arsenic in sufficient quantity to cause death. At the inquest Christina Gregg stated that her husband had told her he had drunk some beer which disagreed with him.

Langstreth made a written statement in which he acknowledged a "criminal intimacy" with Christina Gregg. The coroner's jury also heard evidence that two months before, James Gregg had complained that he "suffered from pain in his inside very much; that he believed something wrong had been given him, and that "his missus" had done it". The jury found Christina Gregg guilty of wilful murder. She was arrested and committed for trial. Edmund Langstreth, although not charged, was also detained. At the Supreme Court trial in Christchurch on 5–6 December 1859, Christina Gregg pleaded not guilty to the charge of murdering her husband. The jury retired for 30 minutes and returned a verdict of not guilty.

== Later life ==
Despite the notoriety of "The Riccarton Poisoning Case", Christina Gregg continued to live on the farm at Riccarton. She married Edmund Langstreth, some 20 years her junior, on 14 December 1862 at St Peter's Church, Riccarton. Under the terms of James Gregg's will his estate was to pass to his son, James, on Christina's death or remarriage. Eventually James Gregg brought a court action against his mother and stepfather, claiming the profits of the estate accrued since their marriage. The Langstreths owned over 500 acres of land at Templeton. Langstreth sold 133 acres and paid James Gregg £730.

By the end of the 1870s whatever had bound Edmund and Christina Langstreth to each other through criminal and civil proceedings had evidently lost its power. Edmund Langstreth left his wife and went to England. Christina continued farming at Riccarton, where she died on 17 November 1882. Edmund Langstreth remarried in England shortly after her death and did not return to New Zealand.
