= Guy Mannering (mountaineer) =

New Zealand banker, mountaineer and writer

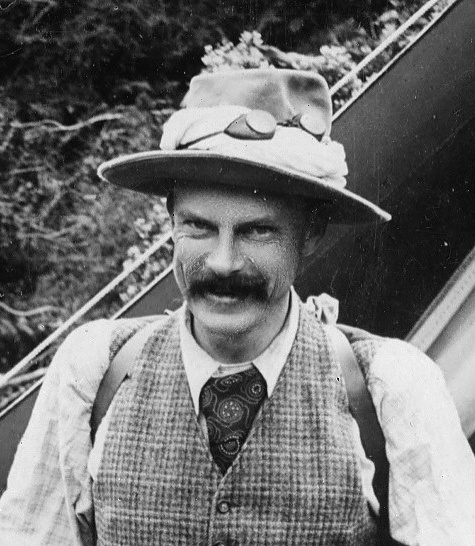
George Edward Mannering in the Tasman Valley of New Zealand in 1895

George Edward Mannering (31 July 1862 – 29 October 1947), known as Guy Mannering, was a New Zealand banker, mountaineer, sportsman, and writer. He was born in Birch Hill Station, North Canterbury, New Zealand on 31 July 1862. He attended the prep school of Sibella Ross before attending Christ's College. Mount Mannering in Aoraki / Mount Cook National Park is named in his honour.

== Bibliography ==
- Mannering, George Edward (1891). With axe and rope in the New Zealand Alps . London and New York: Longmans, Green and Co. OCLC 5296112 (all editions) – via Wikisource.
