= Upper Riccarton =

Suburb of Christchurch, New Zealand

- Suburb
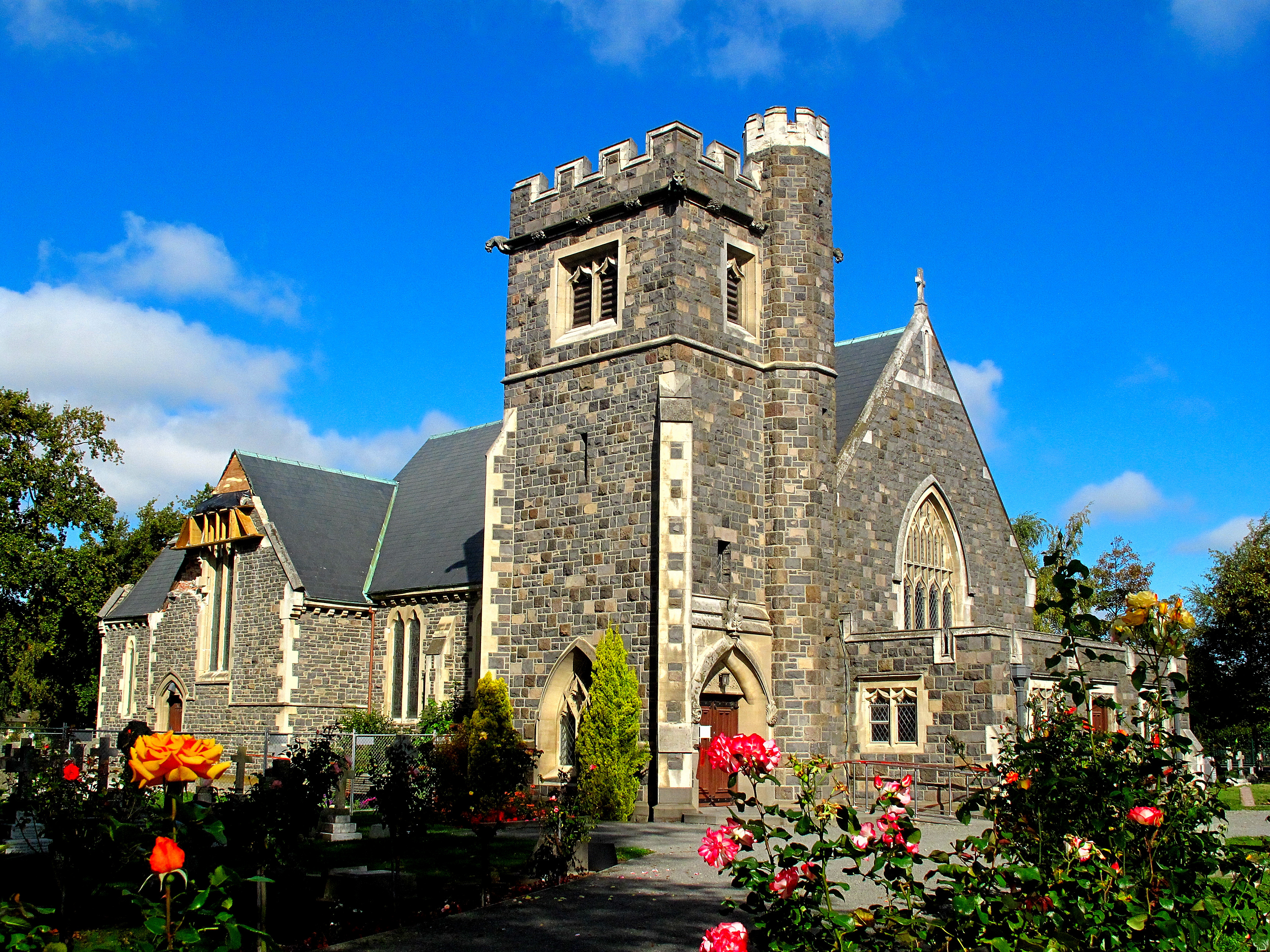
- St Peter's Anglican Church, a landmark of Upper Riccarton, showing damage from the 2011 Christchurch earthquake
- Interactive map of Upper Riccarton
- Coordinates: 43.53178°S 172.57427°E
- Country: New Zealand
- City: Christchurch
- Local authority: Christchurch City Council
- Electoral ward: Riccarton; Waimairi
- Community board: Waipuna Halswell-Hornby-Riccarton; Waimāero Fendalton-Waimairi-Harewood

Area
  - Land: 220 ha (540 acres)

Population (June 2025)
  - Total: 8,190
  - Density: 3,700/km^{2} (9,600/sq mi)

Avonhead	Ilam	Fendalton
Sockburn	Upper Riccarton	Riccarton
Wigram	Middleton	Addington

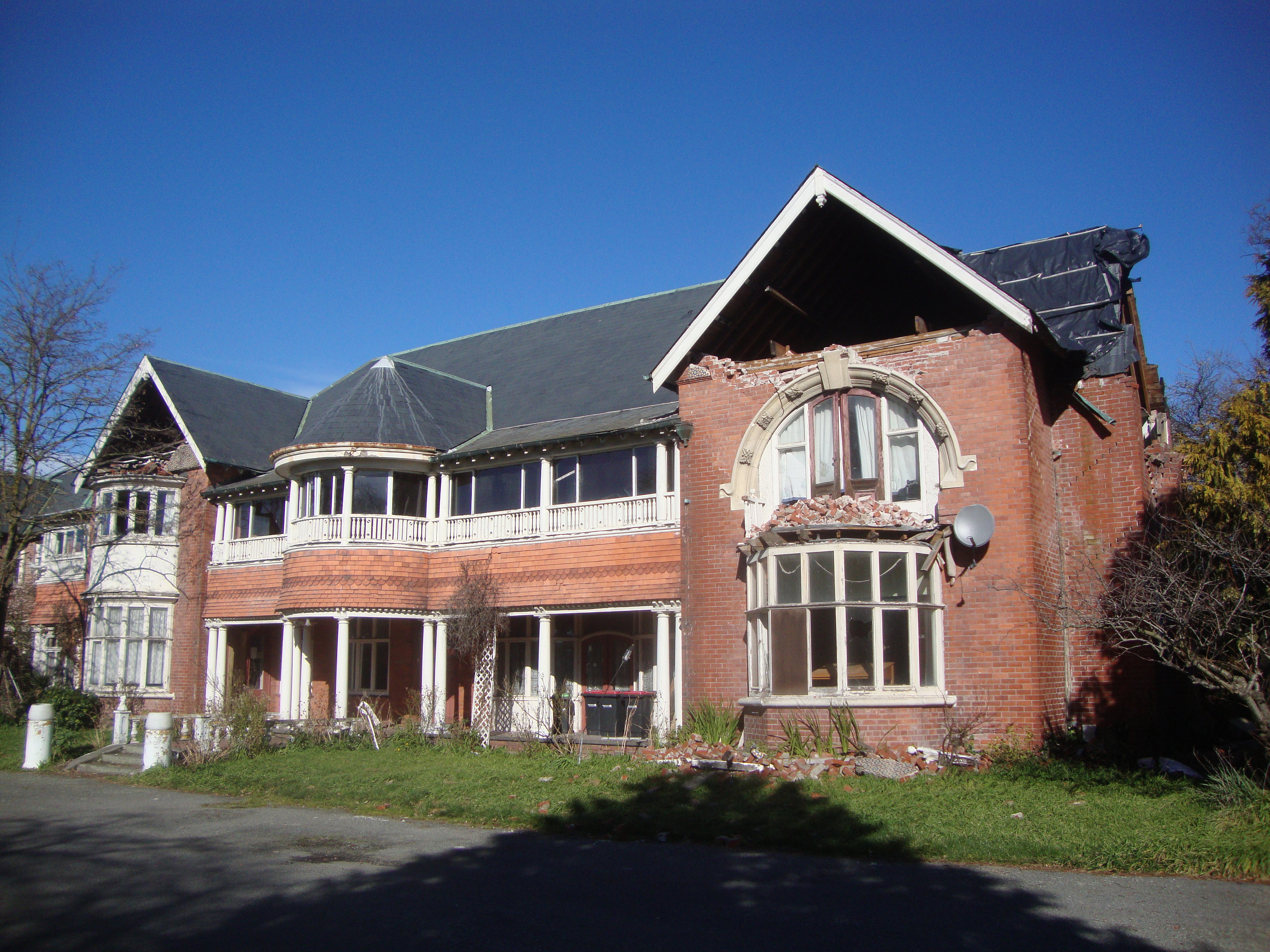
Antonio House, a heritage property built in 1909

Upper Riccarton is a suburb of Christchurch. It is due west of Riccarton. (Note: Riccarton was originally referred to as Lower Riccarton, the whole area being known as Riccarton.)

Upper Riccarton is made up of residential, retail and education areas. It includes a major intersection known as "Church Corner" (the intersection of Riccarton, Main South and Yaldhurst Roads), as well as the Bush Inn Shopping Centre and multiple schools.

A local landmark is St Peter's Church. The original wooden church, consecrated in 1858, was built by Isaac Luck. The later stone church was built between 1876 and 1929, with Benjamin Mountfort the architect for the initial work, but Cecil Wood undertaken most of the architectural design. The old Māori name for Upper Riccarton is Rakipaoa.

== Demographics ==
Upper Riccarton, comprising the statistical areas of Upper Riccarton, Bush Inn and Wharenui, covers 2.20 km^{2} (0.85 sq mi). It had an estimated population of 8,190 as of June 2025, with a population density of 3,723 people per km^{2}.

Historical population
Year	Pop.	±% p.a.
2006	6,183	—
2013	6,903	+1.59%
2018	7,536	+1.77%
2023	7,641	+0.28%

Upper Riccarton had a population of 7,641 in the 2023 New Zealand census, an increase of 105 people (1.4%) since the 2018 census, and an increase of 738 people (10.7%) since the 2013 census. There were 3,927 males, 3,651 females, and 63 people of other genders in 2,442 dwellings. 6.4% of people identified as LGBTIQ+. The median age was 27.7 years (compared with 38.1 years nationally). There were 735 people (9.6%) aged under 15 years, 3,333 (43.6%) aged 15 to 29, 2,364 (30.9%) aged 30 to 64, and 1,203 (15.7%) aged 65 or older.

People could identify as more than one ethnicity. The results were 60.0% European (Pākehā); 9.2% Māori; 4.8% Pasifika; 32.3% Asian; 2.6% Middle Eastern, Latin American and African New Zealanders (MELAA); and 1.1% other, which includes people giving their ethnicity as "New Zealander". English was spoken by 93.6%, Māori by 2.2%, Samoan by 1.6%, and other languages by 26.5%. No language could be spoken by 1.4% (e.g. too young to talk). New Zealand Sign Language was known by 0.4%. The percentage of people born overseas was 39.4, compared with 28.8% nationally.

Religious affiliations were 36.3% Christian, 3.3% Hindu, 2.2% Islam, 0.4% Māori religious beliefs, 1.5% Buddhist, 0.3% New Age, 0.1% Jewish, and 2.8% other religions. People who answered that they had no religion were 48.1%, and 5.1% of people did not answer the census question.

Of those at least 15 years old, 1,500 (21.7%) people had a bachelor's or higher degree, 3,651 (52.9%) had a post-high school certificate or diploma, and 1,752 (25.4%) people exclusively held high school qualifications. The median income was $22,600, compared with $41,500 nationally. 174 people (2.5%) earned over $100,000 compared to 12.1% nationally. The employment status of those at least 15 was 2,355 (34.1%) full-time, 1,278 (18.5%) part-time, and 297 (4.3%) unemployed.

Individual statistical areas
Name	Area (km^{2})	Population	Density (per km^{2})	Dwellings	Median age	Median income
Upper Riccarton	0.52	1,521	2,925	486	26.8 years	$22,400
Bush Inn	0.84	3,279	3,904	1,071	26.4 years	$21,500
Wharenui	0.84	2,841	3,382	888	29.4 years	$24,100
New Zealand					38.1 years	$41,500

== Economy ==
Bush Inn Centre is located in Upper Riccarton and has 45 stores. In June 2023, it was reported that the mall had low foot traffic and several sites were vacant. The mall manager and some shop owners spoke of tough trading conditions.

== Education ==
Riccarton High School is a secondary school for years 9 to 13. It has a roll of 1,103 students. It opened in 1958.

Kirkwood Intermediate is an intermediate school for years 7 to 8, with a roll of 285 students. It opened in 1959.

Te Kāpehu Riccarton School is a full primary school catering for years 1 to 8. It has a roll of 367 students. The school opened in 1859 as Riccarton Church School, and became Riccarton District School in 1864, and later Riccarton Primary School.

Middleton Grange School is a state-integrated composite school for years 1 to 13. It has a roll of 1,385 students. It started as a private Christian school in 1964 and became state-integrated in 1996.

Villa Maria College is a Catholic state-integrated girls' secondary school for years 7 to 13. It has a roll of 829 students. The school opened in 1918, and became state-integrated in 1981. The corresponding Catholic primary and boys' schools, Our Lady of Victories and St Thomas of Canterbury College, are in Sockburn.

Schools are coeducational and state operated unless otherwise noted. Rolls are as of July 2026.

The Upper Riccarton Library is operated as a joint community and school library with Riccarton High. This began with the signing of an agreement in 2004 and was opened on 23 January 2006. The library features a café, meeting rooms and multiple other community resources.
