= St Peter's Church, Riccarton =

St Peter's Church
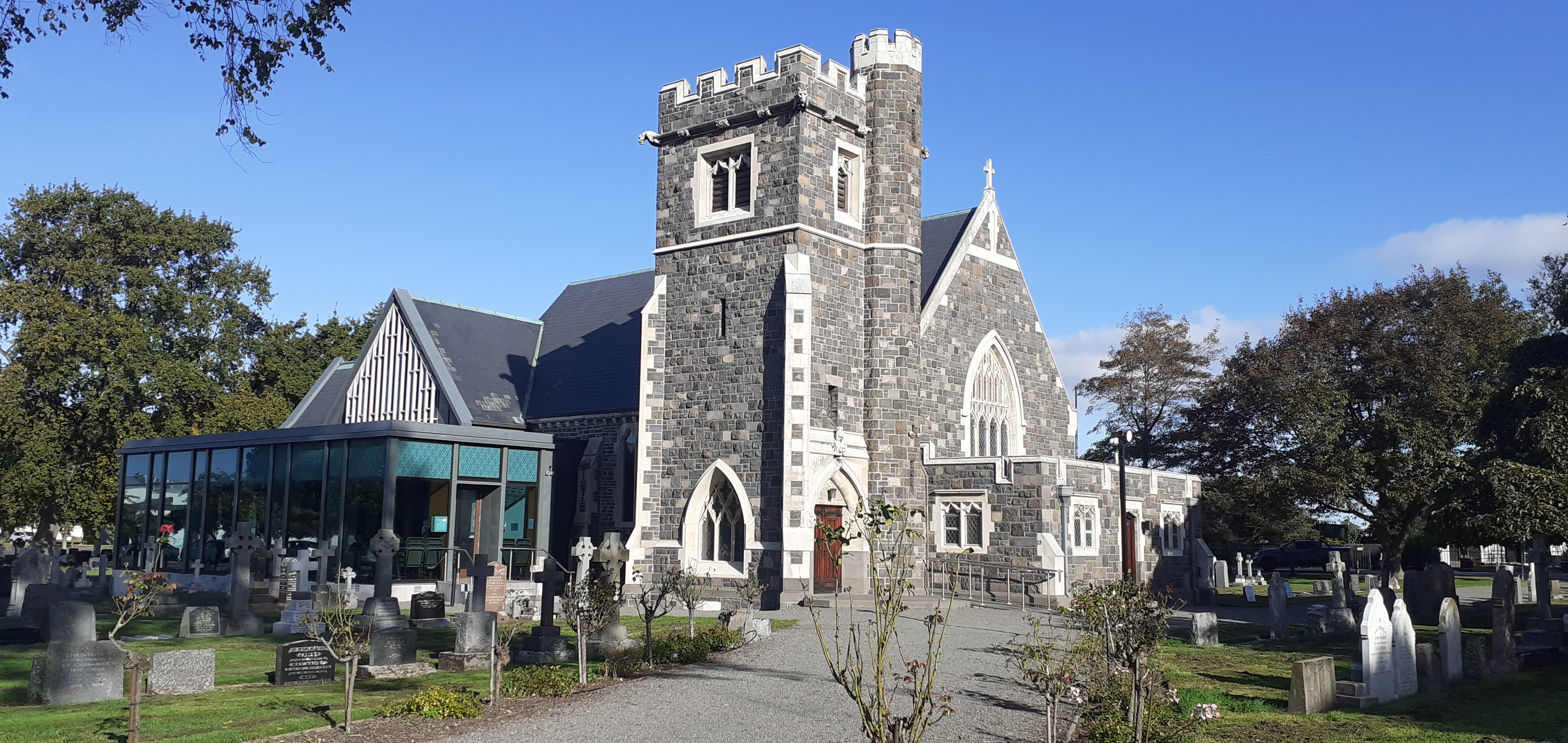
- St Peter's Church in 2023
- St Peter's Church
- 43.5317393°S 172.5701104°E
- Location: 22 Main South Road, Christchurch
- Country: New Zealand
- Denomination: Anglican

Architecture
- Architect(s): Benjamin Mountfort and Cecil Wood
- Style: Arts and Crafts
- Years built: 1876–1929

Administration
- Diocese: Christchurch

Clergy
- Vicar: Nick Mountfort

Heritage New Zealand – Category 2
- Designated: 23 June 1983
- Reference no.: 1792

St Peter's Church is an Anglican church in Riccarton, Christchurch, New Zealand. It is registered as Category II by Heritage New Zealand.

== History ==
The Parish of Riccarton was formed in 1855 when the Parish of Christchurch was subdivided. The graveyard in the grounds of St Peter's was used for burials before a church was constructed on the site. The first church on the site of St Peter's was a wooden church designed by Benjamin Mountfort. The current stone church was built over 40 years in different stages. The first stone addition was the chancel. The chancel was built in 1876 and it was also designed by Mountfort. In 1900 the transepts, additions to the nave and an organ chamber were added, again to the design of Mountfort. In 1928 the final part of the original wooden church was replaced with a new west end and a stone tower both designed by Cecil Wood.

== Canterbury earthquakes and restoration ==
The church sustained damage during the September 2010 Christchurch earthquake and also in the February 2011 Christchurch earthquake. The architectural firm Tennent Brown were engaged to restore and restrengthen St Peter's. The church was restored and strengthened up to 100% of the national building standard and reopened in February 2021.

== Burials ==
- George Ross (1829–1876), farmer and local politician
- Sibella Ross (1840–1929), schoolteacher and businesswoman
- Sibylla Maude (1862–1935), known as Nurse Maude

== See also ==
- List of oldest buildings in Christchurch
