= Valetta, New Zealand =

Locality in Ashburton District, Canterbury Region, New Zealand

Valetta
- Locality
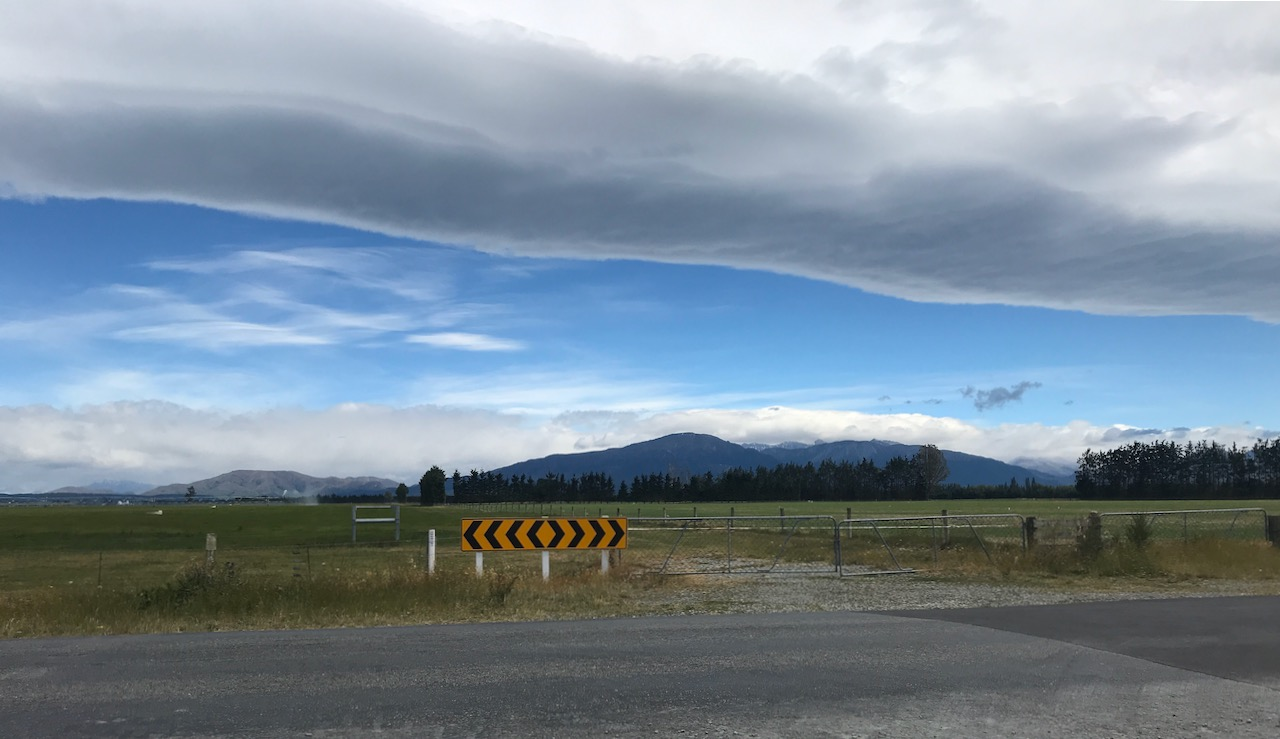
- Intersection at Valetta, with Mount Somers / Te Kiekie in the distance
- Interactive map of Valetta
- Coordinates: 43°46′S 171°29′E
- Country: New Zealand
- Region: Canterbury
- Territorial authority: Ashburton District
- Ward: Western
- Electorates: Rangitata; Te Tai Tonga (Māori)

Government
  - Territorial authority: Ashburton District Council
  - Regional council: Environment Canterbury
  - Mayor of Ashburton: Liz McMillan
  - Rangitata MP: James Meager
  - Te Tai Tonga MP: Tākuta Ferris

Area
  - Total: 70.72 km^{2} (27.31 sq mi)

Population (2023 census)
  - Total: 162
  - Density: 2.29/km^{2} (5.93/sq mi)

Valetta is a lightly populated locality in the mid-Canterbury region of New Zealand's South Island. It is located in an agricultural area on the southern side of the Ashburton River / Hakatere. Another river, the Hinds River, is to Valetta's southwest. Nearby settlements include Mount Somers to the northwest, Anama to the west, Mayfield to the southwest, and Punawai to the southeast. Its name is a misspelling of Valletta, the capital of Malta.

Valetta was formerly served by the Mount Somers Branch, a branch line railway that diverged from the Main South Line at Tinwald, New Zealand, just south of Ashburton. On 3 October 1882, the Westerfield to Anama section of the line opened with a station in Valetta. Passengers ceased to be served by the railway on 9 January 1933 due to declining patronage as a result of increased private ownership of motor vehicles, but freight traffic stayed steady until after World War II. It then declined to the point where the line was no longer profitable and it officially closed on 1 January 1968, though wheat was railed from Valetta until April 1968. Some remnants of the railway still exist in and around Valetta: the station's goods shed, minor bridge abutments, and some of the line's formation.

Valetta has been identified as potentially at risk in the event of a major flood. Construction of flood protection stopbanks along the southern branch of the Ashburton River is proposed but currently on hold.

== Demographics ==
Valetta locality covers 70.72 km^{2} (27.31 sq mi). It is part of the Ashburton Forks statistical area.

Historical population
Year	Pop.	±% p.a.
2006	87	—
2013	135	+6.48%
2018	162	+3.71%
2023	162	+0.00%

Valetta had a population of 162 in the 2023 New Zealand census, unchanged since the 2018 census, and an increase of 27 people (20.0%) since the 2013 census. There were 90 males, 66 females, and 3 people of other genders in 60 dwellings. 3.7% of people identified as LGBTIQ+. The median age was 29.2 years (compared with 38.1 years nationally). There were 42 people (25.9%) aged under 15 years, 42 (25.9%) aged 15 to 29, 69 (42.6%) aged 30 to 64, and 9 (5.6%) aged 65 or older.

People could identify as more than one ethnicity. The results were 75.9% European (Pākehā); 7.4% Māori; 3.7% Pasifika; 14.8% Asian; 1.9% Middle Eastern, Latin American and African New Zealanders (MELAA); and 3.7% other, which includes people giving their ethnicity as "New Zealander". English was spoken by 96.3%, Māori by 1.9%, and other languages by 9.3%. No language could be spoken by 1.9% (e.g. too young to talk). New Zealand Sign Language was known by 1.9%. The percentage of people born overseas was 20.4, compared with 28.8% nationally.

Religious affiliations were 35.2% Christian, 1.9% Islam, and 1.9% New Age. People who answered that they had no religion were 55.6%, and 5.6% of people did not answer the census question.

Of those at least 15 years old, 18 (15.0%) people had a bachelor's or higher degree, 69 (57.5%) had a post-high school certificate or diploma, and 30 (25.0%) people exclusively held high school qualifications. The median income was $57,600, compared with $41,500 nationally. 12 people (10.0%) earned over $100,000 compared to 12.1% nationally. The employment status of those at least 15 was 72 (60.0%) full-time and 24 (20.0%) part-time.
