= Anama, New Zealand =

Coordinates: 43°46′41″S 171°23′24″E

Anama is a sparsely populated locality in the Canterbury region of New Zealand's South Island. It is on the Hinds River, with the Ashburton River / Hakatere not far to the north in nearby Mount Somers. Other nearby settlements include Valetta to the east, Mayfield to the south, and Montalto to the west. Anama School opened in 1902 and closed in 1987. It celebrated its centenary in March 2002.

Anama, an Aboriginal Australian word, owes its naming to W.S. Peter, through being the name of Anama Station, a pastoral property in South Australia owned by Peter's brother-in-law.

Anama was briefly a railway terminus. On 3 October 1882, a 30.9 km long branch line opened to Anama from a junction with the Main South Line at Tinwald, just south of Ashburton. This line, later known as the Mount Somers Branch, was extended to Cavendish on 1 March 1884. Passengers were primarily served by mixed trains, and due to the declining patronage caused by increased usage of the motor car, passengers were no longer carried after 9 January 1933. Freight traffic remained steady for some years but declined after World War II to the point that the railway was no longer economic. It closed on 1 January 1968. Some of the formation can be seen in the area around Anama, and Anama station's platform and loading bank survive.
