= Branxholme locomotive dump =

Railroad facility

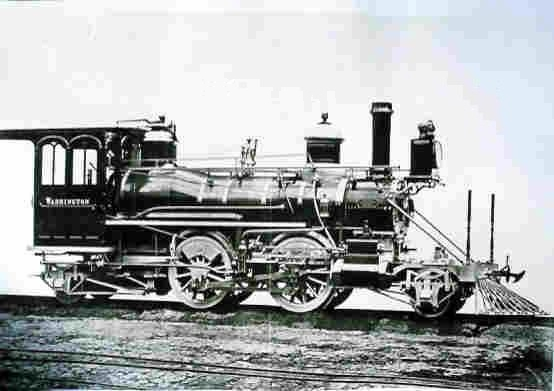
K88 was dumped at Branxholme in 1927. She was retrieved in 1974 and returned to service in 1982 at Plains Vintage Railway.

Branxholme locomotive dump is a steam locomotive and wagon (rail car/vehicle) dump located on the eastern bank of the Ōreti River adjacent and just to the north of Southland's Wairio Branch Line in New Zealand. Locomotives and rolling stock have been dumped here for river protection since the 1920s. In the time since numerous items have been recovered for preservation purposes.

== History ==
During the history of New Zealand Railways, all locomotives and rolling stock have reached or will reach a state of obsolescence. When the cost of scrap metal drops below an economic level, other uses for locomotives and rolling stock are found. Some were dumped in locomotive dumps to aid protection of the railway against erosion or soft ground.

The geology of the Southland Plains is built upon the loose rock which has washed down from the Southern Alps over many centuries. The loose rock and surrounding mud at the Ōreti River crossing at Branxholme provided an unstable formation for the railway lines running west of Invercargill to Ohai, Riverton and Tuatapere.

Initially large amounts of rock and other debris were tipped at Branxholme to stabilise the line, however, this did not stay in place, particularly after heavy rains and subsequent flooding. In 1927, when scrap steel was an uneconomic proposition, New Zealand Railways started dumping obsolete steam locomotives at Branxholme to arrest erosion.

Branxholme is located along the-then Wairio Branch (now the Ohai Industrial Branch) at the point where the railway crosses the Ōreti River. Due to the river coming alongside the railway in an S-bend before passing under the railway bridge, the railway embankment was prone to erosion caused by the flow of the Ōreti. Initial attempts to control this using large quantities of rock and other debris were unsuccessful, and so NZR decided to use old steam locomotives which had been withdrawn as a bulwark against this erosion.

In 1927, NZR sent the hulks of fifteen stripped locomotives to Branxholme for erosion control purposes. The locomotives were moved into position and then were tipped by a steam crane into the river. The first to be tipped into the river was the hulk of P 133, which subsequently lodged on the bank above the river and had to be further tipped by the crane to fall into the river. During the tipping operations, the boiler of P 60 came loose from its frames, as this boiler had been taken from another locomotive but not secured in place as P 60 had been withdrawn from service and was to be stripped prior to dumping. The dumping also exploited a key weakness in the V class locomotives, causing their frames to break just to the rear of the cylinders.

Boilers from a number of classes of locomotives were also dumped, at the Invercargill end of the site. In the early 1950s, parts from several U class locomotives were dumped there, some of which have tentatively been identified as belonging to U 194. A number of old small-firebox boilers from the B^{A} class 4-8-0 tender locomotives and a 1,700-gallon tender was dumped here at some time between 1927 and 1955, by which time there are no further indications of any dumpings taking place.

It is known that scrap-metal hunters have found the dumpsite previously as many of the locomotives have been partially gas-cut to allow access to their copper inner fireboxes and bronze bearings. This has often dictated what engines can be salvaged from the dumpsite. Since the final dumpings took place, the Invercargill city council has constructed a stop-bank near the dumpsite, allowing easier access by enthusiasts to the locomotives.

== Initial locomotive salvage ==
Although enthusiasts were well aware of the Branxholme dumpsite, no salvage attempts were made until 1974 when the Southland Vintage Car Club, with the help of NZR and the Invercargill City Council, exhumed the remains of Rogers K 88 Washington, which was taken to the Plains Vintage Railway at Tinwald Domain near Ashburton for restoration. Twelve years later, the remains of K 94 were salvaged on the behalf of a private owner for restoration to working order at the Plains Railway.

In 1997, railway enthusiast Tony Bachelor decided to salvage and restore a steam locomotive, leading to his salvage of V 35 from the dumpsite with the permission of Tranz Rail and the Invercargill City Council, whose waterworks include the dumpsite. Due to the damage caused by the dumping and subsequent exposure to the elements, the locomotive's cylinders, pony trucks, and driving wheels were salvaged before the frame and boiler were scrapped. In 1999, Bachelor returned and discovered the remains of V 125 and V 136, both of which were salvaged although their frames and boilers were beyond repair. One of the small-firebox B^{A} boilers was also salvaged as a means to restore one of the locomotives.

In 2003, the Ohai Railway Board Heritage Trust decided to salvage the remains of the two P class locomotives dumped at Omoto, P 60 and P 133. Both locomotives placed in storage at group's Wairio base, pending eventual restoration which did not happen. The remains of P 133 were noted in storage in the Dunedin area in 2014, while the frame of P 60, which was salvaged without its boiler, was placed on display beside State Highway 6 at the southern end of Lumsden in late 2014.

The remains of K 95 were also removed from the graveyard during 1998, although it was not preserved but instead taken for parts, while the under-frame and boiler were left in situ.

In January 2020, an 1885 V class locomotive was removed by the Lumsden Heritage Trust. They initially had hoped to removed two locomotives, but decided that it would be too difficult to remove the other. But they were successful in removing it in February. The trust planned on cleaning and displaying them, but not restoring them. Preparations for this removal began in 2018.

== Locomotives dumped at Branxholme ==
Class and Road Number	Type	Builder	Builder's Number	Removed	Notes
J 61	2-6-0	Vulcan Foundry	1004		
K 88	2-4-2	Rogers	2454	1974	Restored to operation at The Plains Railway.
K 94	2-4-2	Rogers	2470	1986	In storage at The Plains Railway.
K 95	2-4-2	Rogers	2471		Parts recovered 1998.
K 97	2-4-2	Rogers	2474		
P 60	2-8-0	Nasmyth Wilson	279	2003	On static display at Lumsden.
P 133	2-8-0	Nasmyth Wilson	280	2003	Stored in the Dunedin area.
U 194	4-6-0	NZR Addington Workshops	22	2003 (frame only)	Moved to Waitara, remains later scrapped.
V 35	2-6-2	Nasmyth Wilson	259	1998	Remains later scrapped.
V 63	2-6-2	Nasmyth Wilson	260		
V 114	2-6-2	Nasmyth Wilson	256		
V 125	2-6-2	Nasmyth Wilson	257	1999	Remains later scrapped.
V 136	2-6-2	Nasmyth Wilson	252	1999	Remains later scrapped.

To this point, researchers cannot find any evidence to support claims that there may be additional locomotives at Branxholme, and such claims have yet to produce any physical or photographic evidence to support them.

== Other locomotive dump sites ==
- Westfield, Auckland
- Oamaru
- Beaumont
- Omoto
- Mararoa
- Bealey River
- Waimakariri River
