= Tinwald Domain =

Park in New Zealand

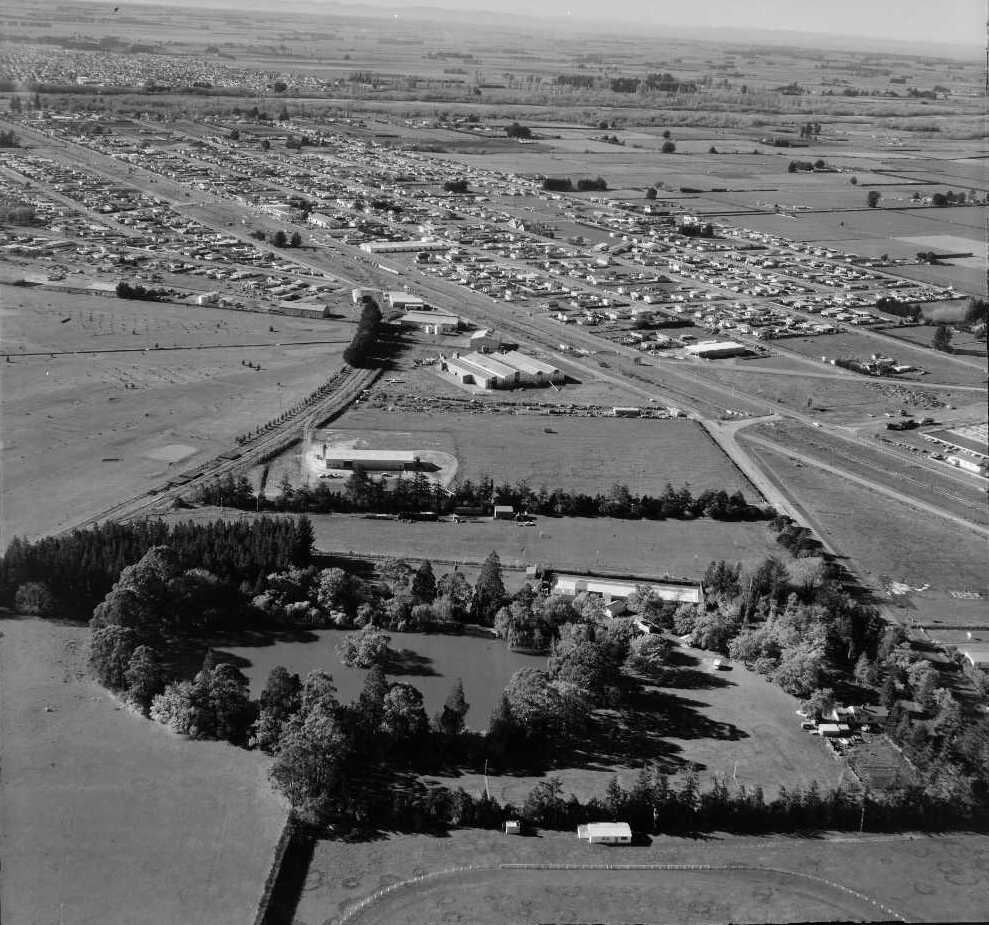
- Aerial view of Tinwald Domain (May 1974)
- Interactive map of Tinwald Domain
- Location: Tinwald, New Zealand
- Coordinates: 43°55′27″S 171°42′22″E
- Area: 98.4 ha (243 acres)
- Operator: Ashburton District Council

Tinwald Domain is a recreation reserve in Tinwald, a suburb of Ashburton, in the South Island of New Zealand. The domain is located to the west of the main settlement of Tinwald and to the north of State Highway 1, and has road frontages on Maronan Road and Frasers Road. The Plains Vintage Railway & Historical Museum is located in the domain, and uses a section of the historic Mount Somers Branch railway line that passes through the reserve. The Tinwald Golf Club has an 18 hole golf course in the reserve that lies between the Mount Somers Branch railway line and Frasers Road. The southern part of the domain, with its boundary along Maronan Road includes a lake and picnic areas, a camp ground, the Plains Historic Village, and buildings occupied by community organisations.

The domain, including the land occupied by the Tinwald Golf Club, is designated as a Recreation Reserve and is governed by the Tinwald Reserve Board, with administration provided by Ashburton District Council. The total area of Recreation Reserve land is just under 100 ha (250 acres). (Note: The ADC Reserve Management Plan Vol 3 reports the area of the Tinwald Domain reserve land as approximately 98.38 ha, but the LINZ Data Service shows the Tinwald Domain Recreation Reserve land has an area of 96.9224 ha.) However, in common usage the Tinwald Domain typically means only the park land in the southern part of the reserve that includes the lake and picnic areas.

== History ==
In 1878, the Ashburton County Council asked Government for a recreation reserve of 24 ha (59 acres). When the grant was made, a larger area of 97 ha (239 acres) was designated under the Public Domains Act 1860. Governance was established with the appointments of members of a Domain Board in January 1879. Fencing of the reserve was underway by September 1879, and an ornamental lake and island were constructed. The lake was excavated using a horse-drawn dredge and is supplied from the Mt Somers Willoughby stock water race which runs through the reserve. By 1891, ornamental iron gates had been fitted at the entrance to the domain, and the lake had been fenced and surrounded with plantings of shrubs and trees.

The domain grounds have been used for organised sport since the 1880s, including horse racing from 1889, when the Tinwald Racing Club moved to the domain, and built a grandstand. Tennis was played in the domain from 1906, swimming from 1912, rugby and hockey.

== Plains Vintage Railway & Historical Museum ==
The Plains Vintage Railway & Historical Museum is a heritage railway and recreated historic village in the Tinwald Domain, owned and operated by the Ashburton Railway & Preservation Society. The railway operates on approximately 3 km (1.9 mi) of rural railway line that was once part of the Mount Somers Branch. The village and railway are open regularly to the public. The railway operates restored locomotives and rolling stock previously in service on New Zealand's national railway network, while the village shows visitors how life was lived in New Zealand's pioneering past.

== Tinwald Golf Club ==
The Tinwald Golf Club was established in 1967, and has an 18 hole golf course on reserve land to the north of the railway line running through the domain.
