= NZR K class =

NZR K class could refer to one of these classes of locomotives operated by New Zealand Railways:

- NZR K class (1877)
- NZR K class (1932)
