= The Plains Vintage Railway & Historical Museum =

Museum in Tinwald, New Zealand

Ashburton Railway & Preservation Society

The Plains Vintage Railway & Historical Museum
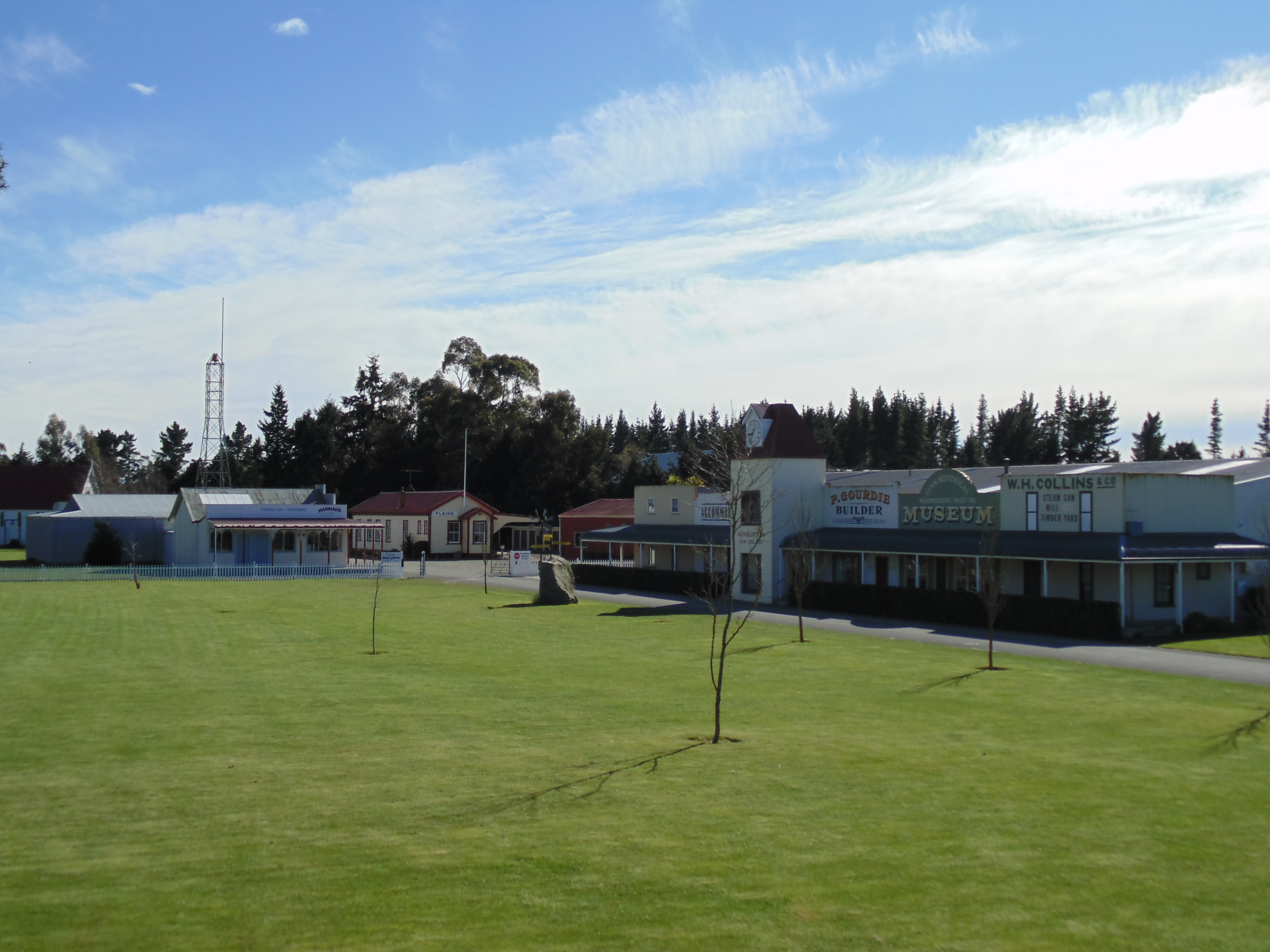
- Entrance road and parking lot for the railway and museum
- Locale: Tinwald, Ashburton, Canterbury, New Zealand
- Terminus: The Plains Museum
- Coordinates: 43.923267°S 171.708422°E
- Connections: KiwiRail Main South Line

Commercial operations
- Name: Mount Somers Branchline
- Built by: New Zealand Government Railways
- Original gauge: 1,067 mm (3 ft 6 in)

Preserved operations
- Owned by: Ashburton Railway & Preservation Society
- Operated by: Ashburton Railway & Preservation Society
- Stations: One
- Length: 2.5km
- Preserved gauge: 1,067 mm (3 ft 6 in)

Commercial history
- Opened: 4 October 1885
- Closed: 1 January 1968

Preservation history
- 1971: Formation of Society
- 1973: First Operation of Trains
- 1981: First Operation of K 88
- 2011: 40th Anniversary Event
- 2016: 45th Anniversary Event

Website
- www.plainsrailway.co.nz

The Plains Vintage Railway & Historical Museum is a heritage railway and recreated historic village in the Tinwald Domain, Tinwald, New Zealand. The railway (operating as The Plains Railway) runs on approximately three kilometres (1.9 mi) of rural railway line that was once part of the Mount Somers Branch. The village and railway are open regularly to the public. The railway utilises preserved and restored locomotives and rolling stock once used on New Zealand's national railway network, while the village shows visitors how life was lived in New Zealand's pioneering past.

== Overview ==
The Ashburton Railway & Preservation Society Inc. (AR&PS) was founded in August 1971 with the goal of purchasing a section of the former Mount Somers Branch railway on which to run restored locomotives alongside preserving heritage farm machinery fast disappearing from the surrounding district. To meet the goal the AR&PS founded The Plains Vintage Railway & Historical Museum and began to acquire exhibits – of both railway, agricultural and other locally historical items – and to erect buildings for storage and display purposes. The museum also acquired three of its most significant buildings, namely the cottage, church and railway station, by relocating existing buildings to the site of The Plains Vintage Railway & Historical Museum.

== K 88 Trust Board ==
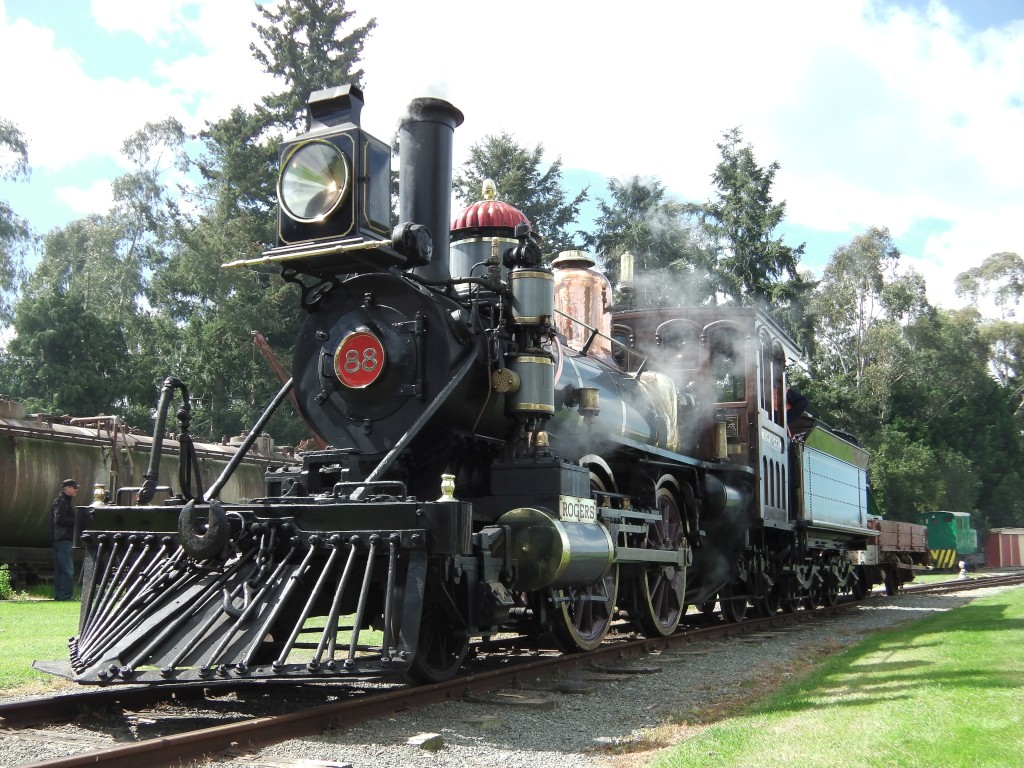
K 88 in operation at The Plains Railway on 28 October 2013.

The K 88 Trust Board was formed on 23 May 1995 and ceased to exist on 3 November 2015. Their overarching goal was to restore and overhaul K's 88 and, perhaps, 94 to operating condition. It was a charitable trust, along with The Friends of K 88 (a parallel support group).

The plan was to:

- Lease K's 88 and 94 from the Ashburton Railway & Preservation Society
- Construct a shed as a base and where 88 will be restored
- Restore K 88 to working order
- Raise funds needed
- Promote the research and recordings in Mid-Canterbury.

On 10 April 1996, the locomotives were formally leased to the K 88 Trust from the Ashburton Railway & Preservation Society, the K 88 Trust Board had purchased the former Ashburton Countdown Supermarket in January 1996 for the restoration base for the locomotives and the trust as a whole.

Fundraising was well under-way before September 1996, and the first goal of restoring K 88 was achieved in 1997 with the construction of its new tender water tank well under-way.

After being in storage for many years at The Plains Railway with a condemned boiler, K 88 was leased to the Trust Board for restoration to working order. This restoration included a new boiler and tender tank. The 1903 Belpaire boiler was condemned on 24 September 1987 due to thinness in the firebox. The original tender tank was badly rusted out. Restoration commenced in 1997 with the new tender water tank being built at Helmack Engineering in Ashburton. The tender tank was copied from its original water tank. The building of the newly welded Belpaire boiler was planned from the 1903 boiler. Funds were made for $100,000. The new boiler was built by Lyttelton Engineering Limited and cost $151,000. In December 1998, K 95's tender frame and bogies were recovered from the Branxholme locomotive dump in the Ōreti River. K 88's original tender frame was badly bent, and the bogies were ex-NZR wagon bogies. The building of the new boiler took a year and four months to complete. The boiler was fitted to the frame of K 88 on 1 July 2000, and the tender tank was fitted to the tender frame not long after that. A new funnel was made by a local engineer. It was first steamed on 14 November 2001 in the same year. K 88 was recommissioned on 30 March 2002 where it showed off her new kaleidoscope that she had worn when she arrived in February 1878. Today K 88 is in active service at The Plains Railway and still is notable for hauling the first inter city express in New Zealand between Christchurch and Dunedin, being one of the original Kingston Flyer locomotives, the first ever locomotive in the world to be restored from a river bed and the oldest ex-NZR tender locomotive in New Zealand.

=== Restoration of K 94 ===
The restoration of K 94 commenced in April 1986, but it was put off. Parts that were in good order were used to replace others on K 88. K 94 later sat behind the carriage shed at The Plains Vintage Railway & Historical Museum acould be used for comparison purposes with K 88.

== 2015 arson attack ==
On the morning of 17 January 2015, the old workshop building was destroyed by an arsonist. The fire destroyed most things contained within the shed (mainly tools, parts, nuts and bolts, boxes, potato equipment, etc.), with only very few of the contents able to be recovered. The fire was reported at around 5:00 am that morning. Five fire engines and a water tanker attended the blaze to bring it under control. The fire was labelled suspicious. The locomotive shed alongside the workshop was damaged, but has been made safe with minor repairs to secure the building.

== Locomotives, Railcars and Rolling Stock ==
The Plains Railway came to world attention when a member of the Rogers K class, K 88, was recovered on 19 January 1974 from the Branxholme Locomotive Dump in the Ōreti River in Southland. Transported by truck to The Plains Railway in July 1974 and restored to a fully operational condition on 27 November 1982. This has set a pattern for other railway enthusiasts recovering a number of locomotives of various classes from where they were dumped, including two other K's. One of them being K 94 was recovered by a private owner and transported by truck to The Plains Railway. Restoration commenced in April 1986 but was later cancelled. It is presently in storage in an unrestored condition and is used as a comparison as it vividly illustrates the condition in which K 88 was recovered and the work required to bring the locomotive to running condition. K 88 received a second restoration beginning in 1997 by the K 88 Trust Board. It was completed on 30 March 2002. The second restoration saw her receive a brand new Belpaire boiler and tender tank.

The museum's rail rolling stock contains several historically important items. These are A 64 which is currently the second oldest operating steam locomotive in New Zealand; J^{A} 1260 which was the last steam locomotive to haul the last night train out of Invercargill and the last steam locomotive to haul trains out of Christchurch; K 88 Washington – which hauled the first inter city express in New Zealand between Christchurch and Dunedin, being one of the original Kingston Flyer locomotives, the first ever locomotive in the world to be restored from a river bed and the oldest ex-NZR tender locomotive in New Zealand; Vulcan Railcar RM 50 which holds the official New Zealand Railways speed record of 78 mph and T^{R} 38 which is the first petrol locomotive in New Zealand.

In addition:

- B 10 from the Oamaru Steam and Rail Restoration Society for the NZ Rail 150 celebrations in October 2013. It also hosted a running day at the railway on 3 November in the same year.
- Rail Heritage Trust of New Zealand's F 163 "Ivanhoe" visited the railway in February 1979 for display in a festival; the locomotive did not run on the Railway.
- K 92 from The Waimea Plains Railway Trust came to the railway in early 2004, where it regularly operated on their open days, including on several occasions with K 88 until 2007, when it was transferred to Oamaru Steam and Rail
- Another RHTNZ locomotive, W 192, visited the railway on a number of occasions from 1992 to 2001.
- F 150, of the Ocean Beach Railway, was stored in a dismantled condition at The Plains Railway from 1986 until 2019, when it was transferred to Invercargill for restoration.

=== NZR Steam locomotives ===
Key:	In service	In service, Mainline Certified	Under overhaul/restoration/repair	Stored	Static display	Scrapped

Original Class and Number	Names	Builder	Builders Number	Year built	Arrived	Notes
A 64		Dubs and Co.	651	1873	1972	Entered NZR service in on 1 January 1875 for branch line duties. Withdrawn in November 1890 and was sold to Canterbury Frozen Meats (CFM), Fairton. Replaced by a Ruston & Hornsby shunter No. 458956 in 1961 and kept as a stand-by locomotive until 1965, when it was donated to the Ashburton Steam and Model Engineers Club and displayed at the Tinwald Domain. In 1971 it was leased to the AR&PS for restoration. The A was the main workhorse from 25 November 1973 until the completion of the first restoration of K 88 and again once the K was out of service pending a new boiler. In 1988 the locomotive received new firebars, and in October of the same year it participated in the Ferrymead 125 cavalcade. In 1991 it was removed from service for a 10-Year Overhaul to take place, during which some tubes were replaced. In the summer of 1997 A 64 was taken out of service for a second restoration where it was repainted into a pleasant green livery with the wooden side tanks (fitted while at CFM) replaced by steel round-ended tanks, the locomotive returned to service on 7 May 2000. In 2012 after K 88's 10-year boiler survey was completed A 64 was taken out of service and put through its first 10-year boiler inspection/general overhaul since re-entering service in 2000. It returned to service in time for the New Zealand Rail 150 celebrations on 26 October 2013, and as such was the oldest operating steam locomotive in the country for the event. From 24 September 2014 until 28 January 2015, it was placed on loan to the Canterbury Railway Society for operation on their Ferrymead Heritage Park until the restoration of their locomotive, F 13 was completed. It is now the second-oldest operating locomotive in New Zealand, after F 13 of the Canterbury Railway Society (built in 1872).
J^{A} 1260		NZR Hillside Workshops	383	1952	February 1973	Entered service in November 1952 for the NZR where it hauled passenger and freight trains until 1971 when it hauled the last steam-hauled express out of Dunedin and hauled the last steam-hauled express's out of Christchurch. In August of that year was withdrawn from service. Sold to the AR&PS on 10 May 1972 Ja 1260 was originally stored in Ashburton in the locomotive shed until such time as the AR&PS could take possession. In February 1973 where it was towed to The Plains Railway where it was returned to operational condition and used from December 1975. In September 1986 it was leased to the Weka Pass Railway until 1988 where it was returned to the Plains. In 1990 full restoration commenced. After a long hiatus restoration work began again in earnest in 2007, re-entering service on 25 April 2008. The Ja was removed from service in 2013 requiring new tubes and fire-bar replacement and returned to service in March 2018.
K 88	Washington	Rogers Locomotive Works	2454	1877	July 1974	Entering service on 18 March 1878, K 88 is famous for having hauled the first 'Express Passenger' train between Christchurch and Dunedin on 6 September that year. In November 1926 K 88 was withdrawn and dumped in the Branxholme locomotive dump in the Ōreti River on 5 June 1927. The locomotive was removed from the mud at Branxholme on 19 and 20 January 1974 and trucked to The Plains Railway in July that year. This is where restoration began by members at The Plains Railway led by the late Mr. Bob Anderson. It moved under its own power, for the first time since November 1926, on 7 November 1981 before re-entering service 27 November 1982. The K was used extensively in the filming of "Hanlon: In Defence of Minnie Dean" a TV mini-series filmed in 1984. The K was used to promote Monteith's Beer between May and October 1986, running extensively on the mainline around Christchurch and Dunedin and was again used on film January 1987 when it was hired for filming of the New Zealand film "Starlight Hotel". K 88's boiler, which was the boiler the locomotive was recovered from the Ōreti River with, was condemned on 24 September 1987 removing the locomotive from service. The K was then stored until 1998 when the second restoration began with the construction of a new boiler and tender tank, the locomotive was re-commissioned on 30 March 2002. K 88's first 10-year boiler inspection of its new boiler took place on 19 May 2012, out of action for just a few months it was back in service on 14 September 2012. The locomotive went out of service for a ten-year boiler inspection and returned to working order for the railway's 50th anniversary.
K 94		Rogers Locomotive Works	2470	1878	21 April 1986	Entered service in December 1878. K 94 was withdrawn in November 1926 and dumped in the Branxholme locomotive dump in the Ōreti River on 5 June the same year. Recovered privately and transported to The Plains Railway on 21 April 1986 for restoration. Work commenced by the late Mr. Bob Anderson, but ceased after his death and later the locomotives owner's death. Stored in a partially dismantled state since with a number of parts removed for use on the other preserved K class locomotives.

=== NZR Diesel locomotives ===
Key:	In service	In service, Mainline Certified	Under overhaul/restoration/repair	Stored	Static display	Scrapped

Original Class and Number	TMS/Reclassified Class and Number	Builder	Builders Number	Year built	Arrived	Notes
D^{SA} 218	DSA 224	Drewry	2416	1953	4 April 2014	Entered NZR service in December 1953 for shunting duties. Withdrawn in August 1982 and sold to the Ohai Railway Board, Ohai for shunting use for coal trains. Used until July 1989 when it was sold to the Oamaru Steam and Rail Restoration Society. Swapped for Hudswell Clarke built B 10 from the Pukeuri Alliance Freezing Works, Pukeuri in November the same year. Used there since then until the arrival of DSC 2067 in 2007. Purchased by the AR&PS in January 2014 and was transported to The Plains Railway on 4 April 2014. D^{SA} 218 is now under short to mid-term restoration.
T^{R} 38	W^{W} 4048	A & G Price	144	1939	February 1982	Entered service in 1938 as W^{W} 4048 for the NZRs Ways and Works Department. Later it was reclassified T^{R} 38. The T^{R} was the first diesel rail tractor in New Zealand. Withdrawn in 1974 and was purchased by the West Coast Historical and Mechanical Society and transported to the Shantytown Heritage Park. T^{R} 38 was purchased by the AR&PS on 4 January 1982 and transported to The Plains Railway in February the same year. Whilst in an operable state, T^{R} 38 awaits an engine overhaul.

=== Industrial Diesel locomotives ===
Key:	In service	In service, Mainline Certified	Under overhaul/restoration/repair	Stored	Static display	Scrapped

Type	Plains Railway Identity	Builder	Builders Number	Year built	Arrived	Notes
Ruston		Ruston & Hornsby	458956	1961	2003	Entered service in on 7 September 1961 to replace A 64 at the Canterbury Frozen Meats (now the Fairton Silver Fern Farms), Fairfield (now Fairton). The Ruston is now on long-term lease to The Plains Railway and sees use shunting light locomotives and rolling stock as well as regular use on work trains.
Howard	T^{R} 12	J & F Howard, England	976	1930	28 March 1986	It entered service for the Department of Public Works in 1930, later transferred to the Smithfield Freezing Works in Timaru. Donated to the AR&PS in 1986 and was used for shunting purposes for many years until the arrival of the Price. Since arrival it has been reclassified as T^{R} 12. It entered active restoration in early 2012.
Price	T^{R} 119	A & G Price	198	1960	12 September 1995	The Price entered service in 1960 for Kempthorne Prosser & Co. of Hornby, Christchurch for shunting their private sidings. Sold to the Weka Pass Railway in 1985 and later sold to the AR&PS in August 1995. It arrived on 12 September the same month and restoration commenced in the same month. Restoration was completed in 1996 and was repainted into the 'Midland Red' livery and reclassified as T^{R} 119. In 1997 the locomotive won the annual A & G Price Restoration Award at that year's Federation of Rail Organisations of New Zealand conference. 119 now sees use shunting J^{A} 1260 and other rolling stock, as well as semi-regular use on works trains.

=== Railcars ===
Key:	In service	In service, Mainline Certified	Under overhaul/restoration/repair	Stored	Static display	Scrapped

Original Class and Number	Builder	Builders Number	Year built	Arrived	Notes
RM 50	Vulcan Foundry	4845	1940	March 1979	Entered NZR service in October 1940. RM 50 achieved a speed of 125.5 km/h (78 mph) on a section of the Midland Line east of Springfield on 25 the same month. This remains the fastest speed officially attained on New Zealands railway network. RM 50 was involved in a runaway in the Otira Tunnel on 23 April 1957 alongside RM 58 which left both units damaged in the resulting derailment and lead to alterations of the railcars including the fitting of a second air compressor. Taken out of service in July 1978 and written off in September 1978 RM 50 was sold to The Ashburton Railway & Preservation Society in February 1979 – it arrived at The Plains Railway the next month. It usually sees regular use in the summer months, however it is currently the railways main motive power.

In addition:

- Spare power bogies and engines for the railcar are currently in outside storage.

=== Carriages ===
Key:	In service	In service, Mainline Certified	Under overhaul/restoration	Stored	Static display	Scrapped

Original class and number	Builder	Type	Year built	Arrived	Notes
A 184	NZR Addington Workshops	47' 6" wooden body, passenger coach	1913	1971	Entered NZR service on 21 June 1913. Withdrawn on 20 June 1970. It took part in the Hanlon: In Defence of Minnie Dean TV mini-series in 1984. It participated in the Ferrymead 125 celebration being used on shuttle trains from Christchurch to Rangiora. It was repaired and repainted in the "Midland Red" livery in October 2004.
A 475	NZR Addington Workshops	43' 9" wooden body, passenger coach	1900	2 December 1988	Entered NZR service in 1900. Withdrawn on 26 June 1954. Kept on a farm in Mount Somers. Stored outside bogie less until 2018 moved under-cover.
A 784	NZR Addington Workshops	47' 6" wooden body, passenger coach	1903	2003	Entered service in 1903. Withdrawn on 15 October 1955 and kept on a private property. In outside storage.
A 1429	NZR Addington Workshops	47' 6" wooden body, passenger coach	1915	1970s	Entered NZR service on 13 November 1915. Withdrawn on 18 June 1977 and was originally allocated to Invercargill. It was also used in the Hanlon: In Defence of Minnie Dean TV mini-series in 1984. It also participated in the Ferrymead 125 celebration being used on shuttle trains from Christchurch to Rangiora. In 1991 it was repainted in a lighter shade of red and was repaired and again repainted in 2002 in the "Midland Red" livery.
A^{A} 1024	NZR Petone Workshops	50' 0" wooden body, passenger coach	1908	1974	Entered NZR service on 10 October 1908. Worked in the North Island until July 1950 when it was moved to the South Island. Purchased by the AR&PS on 22 February 1974. Withdrawn on 30 March 1974. Used occasionally prior to withdrawal from active service and being placed into storage. Restoration commenced in 1988, but was later cancelled due to other projects. Although it was repainted in a protective coat of dull red/brown 'roof paint' to seal the timber from moisture. Active restoration commenced on 17 September 2008.

In addition:

- A 222 Formerly owned by the Tranz Rails heritage fleet. In 2002 it was leased to the society. It was later donated to the Canterbury Railway Society.

=== Guards and Brake vans ===
Key:	In service	In service, Mainline Certified	Under overhaul/restoration	Stored	Static display	Scrapped

Original class and number	TMS class and number	Builder	Type	Year built	Arrived	Notes
F 322	F 151	NZR Hillside Workshops	30 ft (9.1 m) wooden body, guards' van	1907	1979	Entered NZR service in March 1907. Withdrawn on 10 November 1979. In 1984, F 322 was restored and repainted. Also in that year it was used in the Hanlon: In Defence of Minnie Dean TV mini-series. It participated in the Ferrymead 125 being used on shuttle trains from Christchurch to Rangiora.
F 532	F 1212	NZR Addington Workshops	50 ft (15 m) wooden body, guards' van	1931	N/A	Entered NZR service on 31 March 1931. Withdrawn in 1988. Scrapped due to an arson attack in April 2007 whilst under restoration. Its frame and bogies are now stored and used for a supply of parts. Formerly owned by the Ocean Beach Railway, and then privately, the van has since fallen into the ownership of the AR&PS.

=== Wagons ===
Key:	In service	In service, Mainline Certified	Under overhaul/restoration	Stored	Static display	Scrapped

Original class and number	TMS class and number	Type	Builder	Year built	Arrived	Notes
E 852		Tank	N/A	1880s	1974	Entered NZR service prior to the 1890 renumbering programme as an N class wagon, it was renumbered as N 212 in 1890. Reclassified and renumbered as E 852 on 8 January 1938 when it was fitted with the tank it now carries. Withdrawn on 9 November 1974 and sold to The Plains not long after. It worked as a water supply for the neighbouring farm paddocks and as a platform for tree pruning until the 1990s. In January 2011 restoration work started for The Plains Railway's 40th Anniversary. E 852 is now back in service and sees occasional use on public running days. Won the 2012 FRONZ Goods or Service Vehicle Restoration Award.
L^{A} 13498		High Side	NZR Petone Workshops	1922	N/A	NZR service from 14 October 1922 to 24 February 1973. The L^{A} is used to store coal.
L^{B} 9579		High Side	NZR Petone Workshops	1911	1972	Formerly used a passenger wagon when there was no carriages available. It is now used to store parts and also awaiting restoration.
M 173		Low Side	N/A	N/A	1972	Withdrawn on 22 May 1971. Overhauled in 1995. It has sometimes been used as a runner wagon for A 64 on public running days, but is now stored out of service due to its condition.
N^{A} 1875	NA 4647 NAK 6622	Flat Deck	NZR Addington Workshops	1977	N/A	Entered NZR service in 1977 as N^{A} 1875. Renumbered as NA 4647 circa 1978. Reclassified in 1983 as NAK 6622. Sees regular use on work trains. Owned by the Rail Heritage Trust of New Zealand.
U^{CT} 1603	UCT 170	Tank	NZR Hillside Workshops	1970	N/A	Entered NZR service on 18 July 1970. Renumbered as UCT 170 in 1978. Used for the transportation of Tallow. U^{CT} 1603 is the only one of its class to be preserved. Owned by the Rail Heritage Trust of New Zealand.
V 76		Insulated Meat	Hillside Workshops	1903	2 October 2015	Entered NZR service on 31 March 1903. It received an A-Grade overhaul in May 1970 and its Westinghouse brakes overhauled in January 1973. Written off on 21 June 1975 and was sold to the Tinwald Ravensdown Fertilizer plant. Donated to the Plains in 2014, and arrived on site on 2 October a year later.
V^{S} 863	VS 898	Insulated Meat	Commonwealth Engineering, Australia (erected by NZR Addington Workshops)	1958	1979	Entered NZR service in 1958. Renumbered as VS 898 in 1978. Withdrawn on 19 September 1979. Used for transportation of chilled meats. Arrived with spares for Vulcan Railcar RM 50. It is used also to store other locomotive and railway equipment parts.
Y^{B} 138	YB 375	Ballast	N/A	1921	N/A	Renumbered as YB 375. Withdrawn on 22 June 1985. In the past the Y^{B} has been used for ballast trains, but is at present out of service waiting for an overhaul.
Y^{C} 890	YC 2272	Ballast	NZR Addington Workshops	1961	N/A	Entered NZR service in May 1961. Renumbered as YC 2272 in 1978. Used for ballast trains. Owned by the Rail Heritage Trust of New Zealand.

=== Cranes ===
Key:	In service	In service, Mainline Certified	Under overhaul/restoration	Stored	Static display	Scrapped

Type	Number	Builder	Builder's number	Year built	Arrived	Notes
2-ton Hand Crane	N/A	Ransomes and Rapier	N/A	1877	1972	Formerly used by the NZ Electricity Department for their Islington siding. Purchased by the Canterbury Railway Society, mid-1960s. On long-term loan to the AR&PS.
Wheelset Crane	360	N/A	N/A	1911/1926	1987	Originally constructed as crane 301 in 1911 the crane was written off as damaged in 1925. However, it was rebuilt and renumbered as 360 and was back in service in 1926 and seems to have spent most of its life at Invercargill. It is currently under restoration.
5 Ton Lift Steam Crane	N/A	Whitticker	N/A	N/A	1978	Used by the Oamaru Harbour Board, sold to The Plains Railway and used for re-laying track and other lifting work. Retubed in 1990 and 1993. Now stored, out of service since the 1990s after part of the slewing gear became seized

=== Jiggers ===
The society has in their care 3 four-wheel motor jiggers, a three-wheel motor jigger, 2 four-wheel hand jiggers and a three-wheel hand jigger. They also have four trailers also in their care.

== Traction Engines ==
The society has three traction engines and one portable engine in their collection. The traction engines consist of a 1/3 scale Burrell Traction Engine built by a local engineer the late Hughey Rainey, a McLaren N^{O}. 1718 (owned by the Ashburton District Council) and a Marshall N^{O}. 59534. In the past, some AR&PS members have loaned their engines to the museum for extended periods, but these have since gone elsewhere.

The Society has a Portable Engine of Marshall, Sons & Co. in its collection, which is currently privately owned.

=== Traction Engines ===
Key:	Operational	Under overhaul/restoration	Stored	Stored, Serviceable Condition	Static display	Scrapped

Type	Builder	Builder's number	Year built	Arrived at The Plains Railway	Notes
Burrell	Hughey Rainey	n/a	1963	1963	Built by the late Hughey Rainey in 1963 and is used on open days.
Marshall	Marshall, Sons & Co.	59534	1910 or 1912	N/A	Donated to the AR&PS by Dennis Gordon. Used until 2006.
McLaren	J&H McLaren & Co.	1718	1925	1990s	Owned by Ashburton District Council. On long-term loan to the AR&PS. Used on open days and rallies. "The Mac", as the engine is commonly referred to as, is the only engine remaining in New Zealand to still be owned by the original purchaser – the Ashburton County Council (since renamed the Ashburton District Council).

=== Portables ===
Key:	Operational	Under overhaul/restoration	Stored	Stored, Serviceable Condition	Static display	Scrapped

Type	Builder	Builder's number	Year built	Arrived at The Plains Railway	Notes
Marshall	Marshall, Sons & Co.	4483	1879	N/A	Stored in an operational condition, Owned by Alan Bowis and Sons.

Also:

- The AR&PS also have a boiler from a Garrett Portable Traction Engine in their care.

== Machinery ==
=== Binders ===
Key:	Operational	Under overhaul/restoration	Stored	Stored, Serviceable Condition	Static display	Scrapped

Builder	Year built	Arrived at The Plains Railway	Notes
Massey Harris	N/A	N/A	Used to harvest oats.
N/A	N/A	N/A	Stored.

=== Home media ===
The restoration of the Rogers Locomotive and Machine Works locomotive K88 "Washington" was covered by three films, on VHS and DVD, produced by the White Bus Family Productions of New Zealand:

- Out of the Mud
- A Dream Completed
- From Dream to Reality

=== Gallery ===
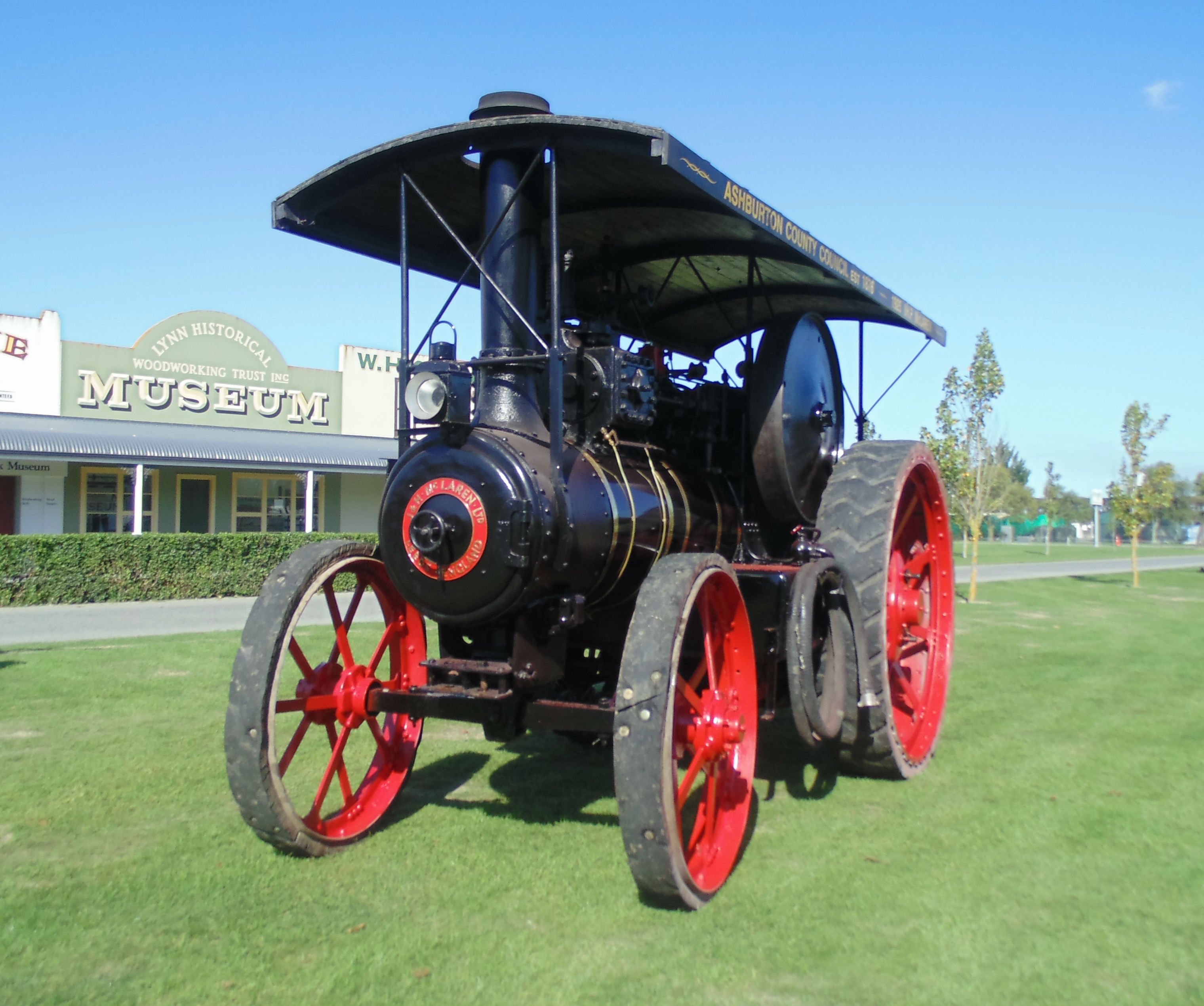
McLaren Traction Engine No. 1718 in the afternoon sun after some touch had been made to its wheels after receiving a full repaint, 22 March 2014.

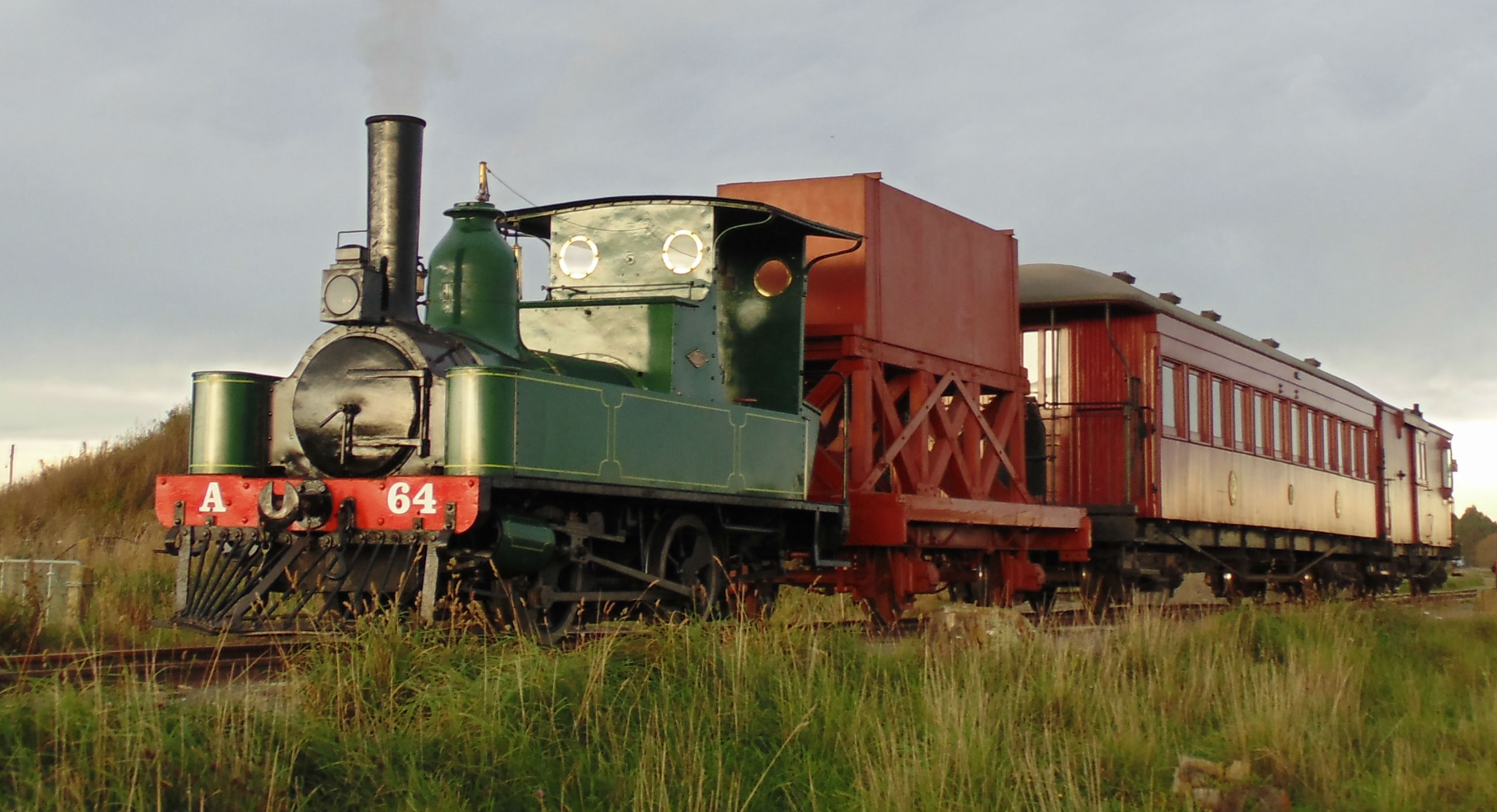
A 64 at the photo stand, 27 April 2014.

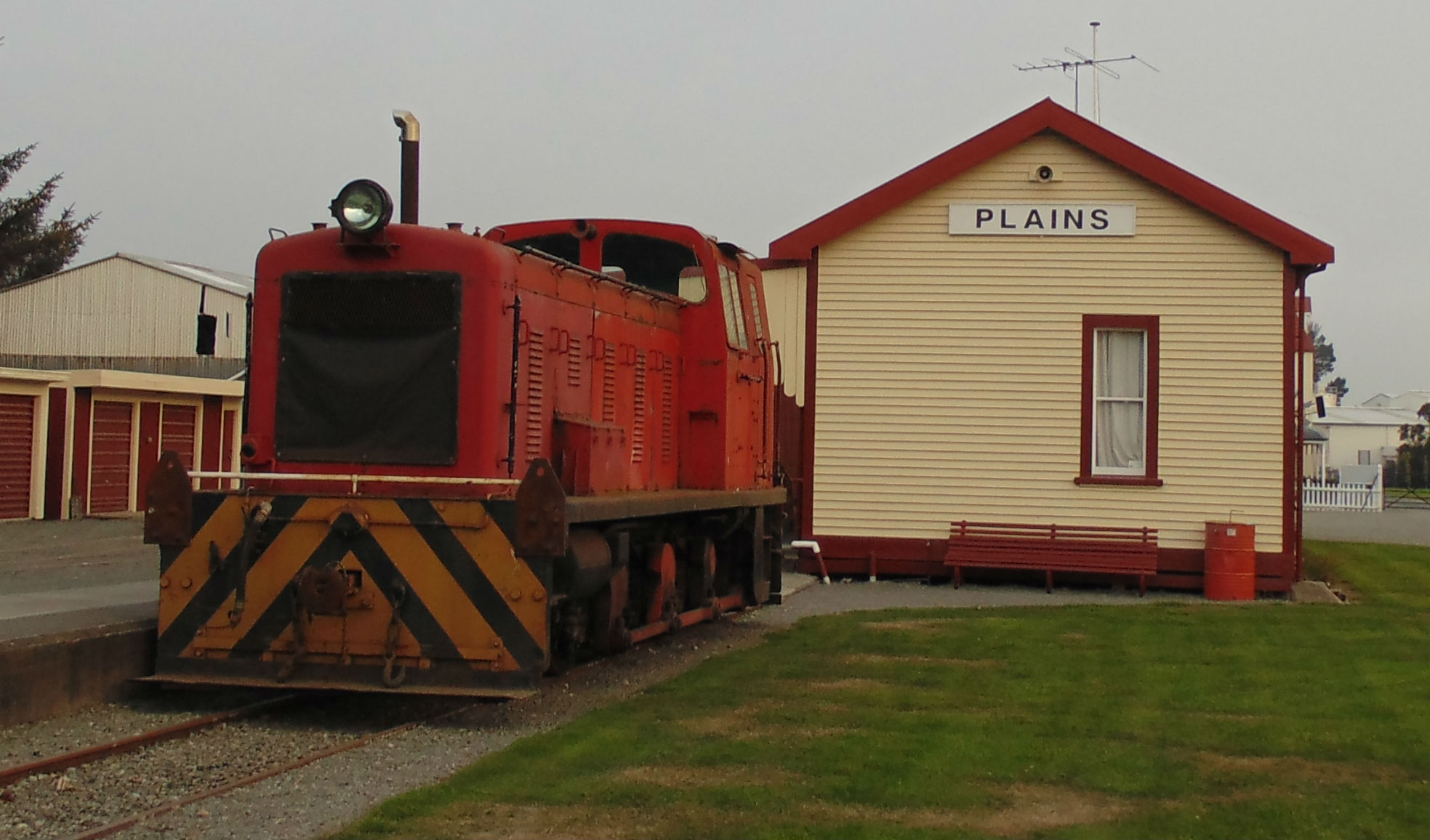
D^{SA} 218 not long after arriving at the museum, 4 April 2014.

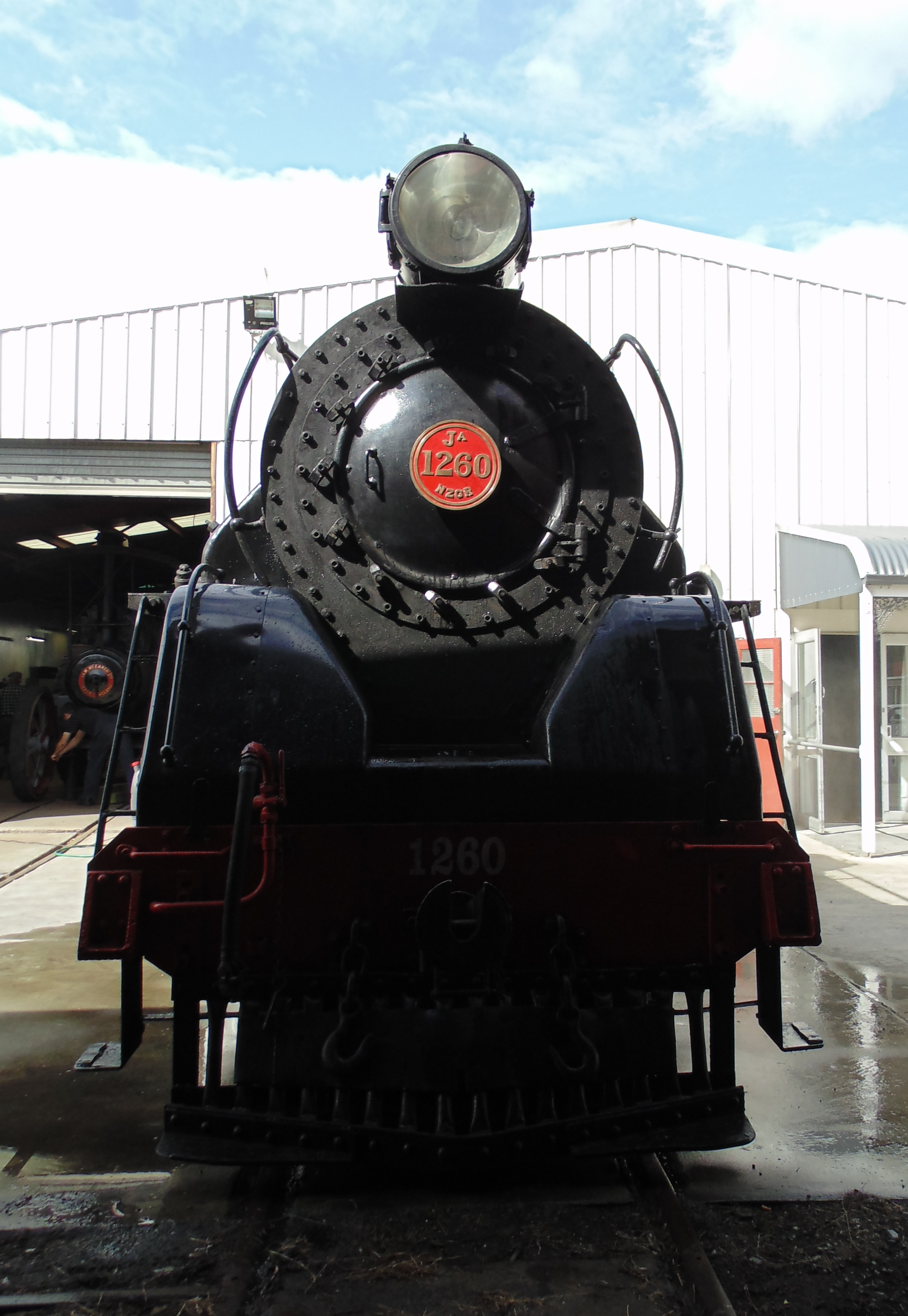
J^{A} 1260 after having a wash, 8 March 2014.

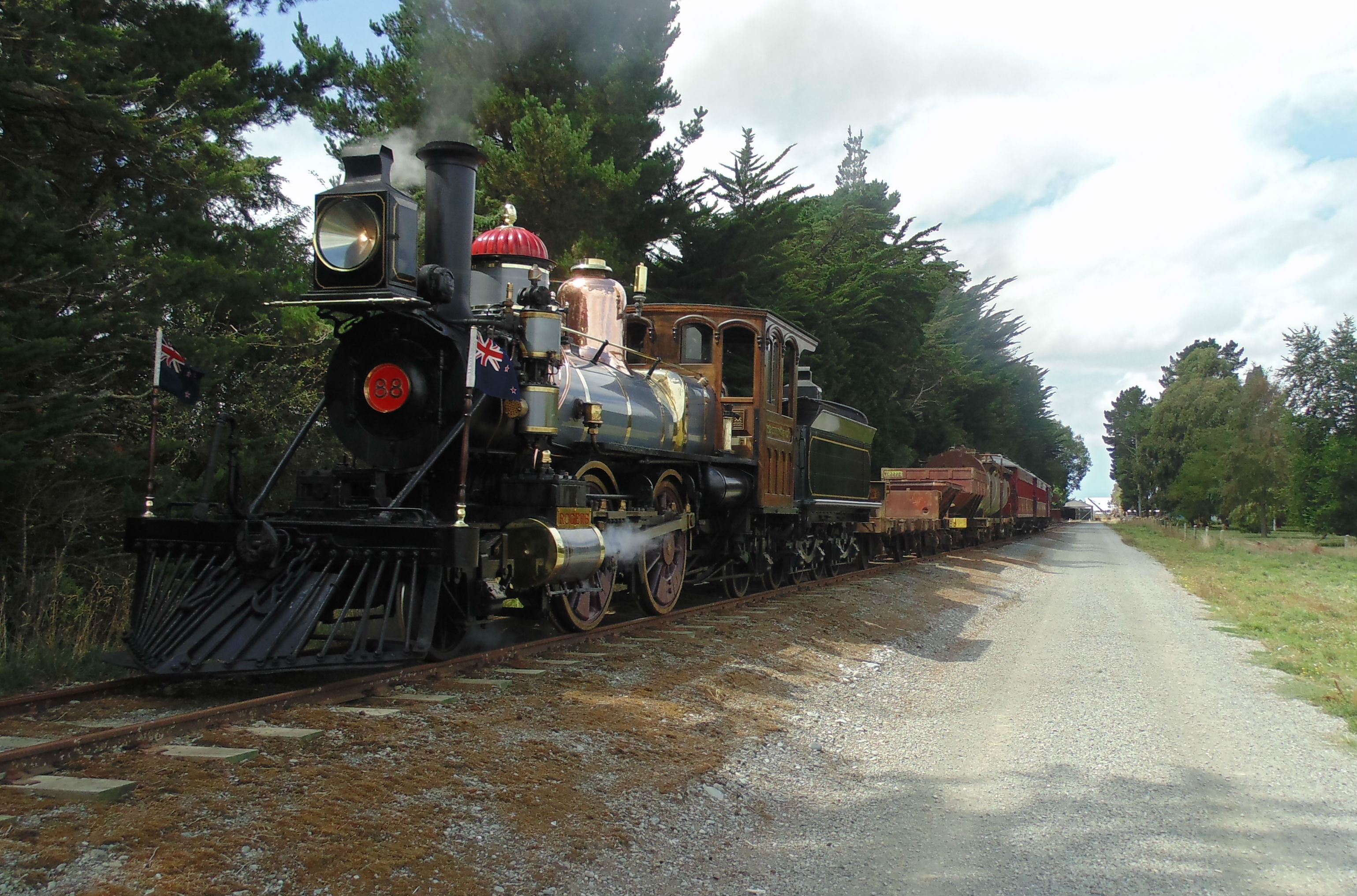
K 88 with a mixed train, 16 February 2014.

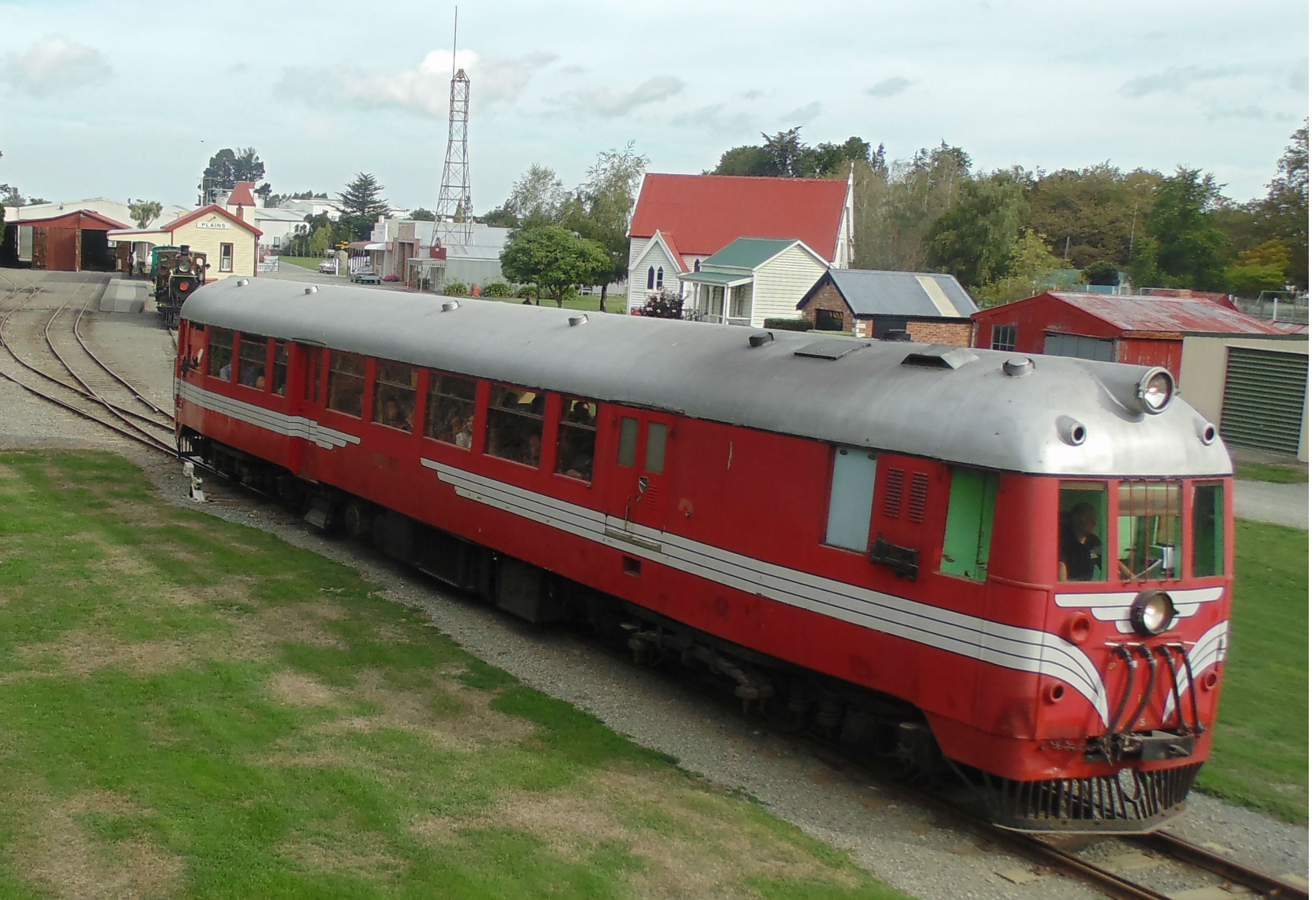
RM 50 leaving the station, 15 March 2014.
