= Oamaru Steam and Rail Restoration Society =

Railway preservation society in New Zealand

Coordinates: 45°6′7.73″S 170°58′11″E

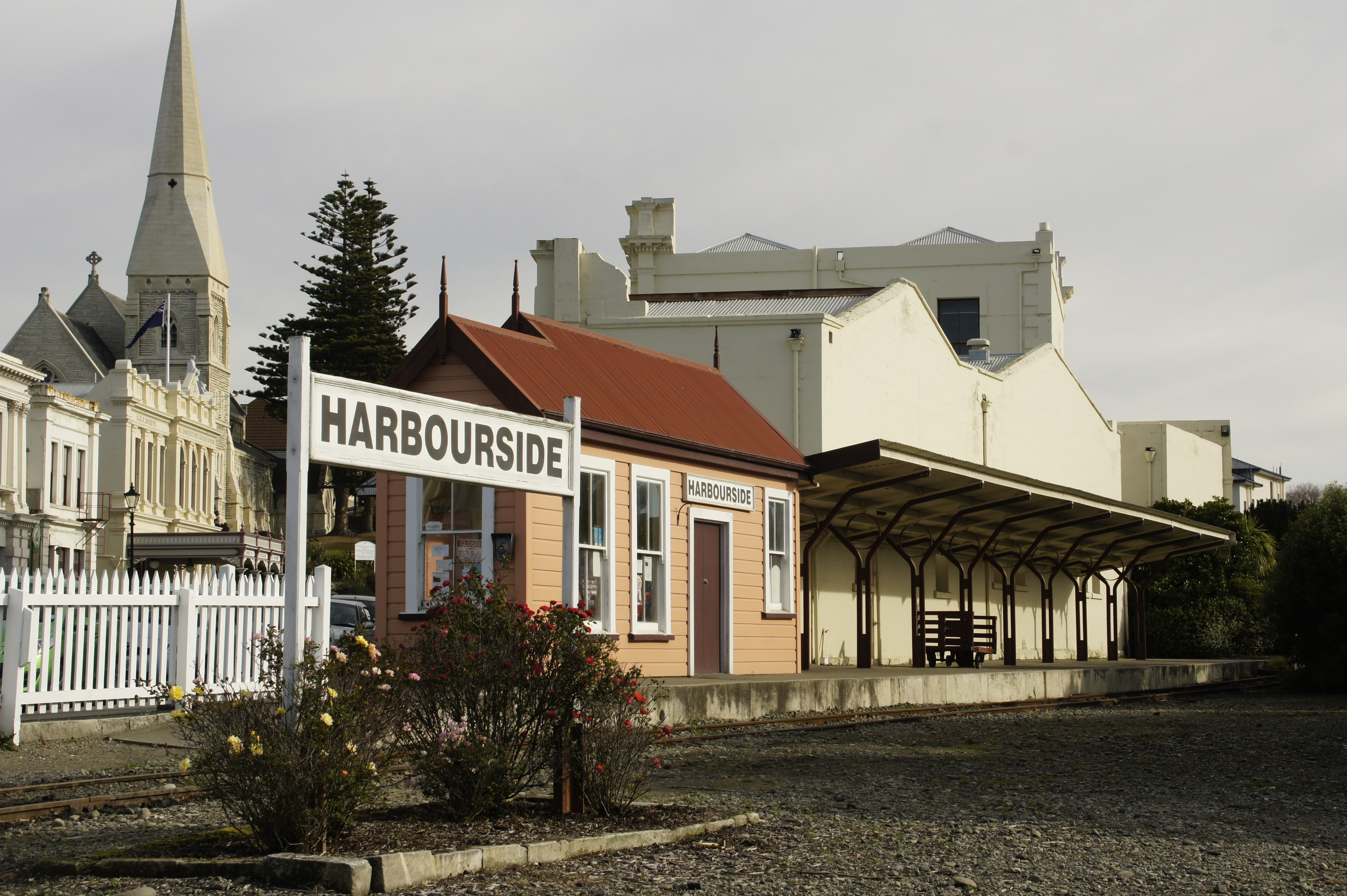
Oamaru Harbourside Station

The Oamaru Steam and Rail Restoration Society was formed in 1985 to preserve PWD 535. Since establishment the Society has acquired and preserved Hudswell Clarke built 0-4-0ST B10 of 1924 from the Pukeuri Alliance Freezing Works, a Robert Stephenson & Hawthorns shunter No.7908 of 1962 from the Pukeuri Alliance Freezing Works and T^{R} 35 of 1939 from the New Zealand Railways Corporation. The society also currently has D^{SA} 234 on loan to them by one of their members. The railway is located in Oamaru's Historic Precinct, utilising a portion of the former New Zealand Railways Oamaru yard. Train travels every Sunday from Harbourside Station to Quarry Siding (1.7km) located by the Oamaru Blue Penguin Colony, alongside Oamaru's Victorian Harbour.

== Locomotives and rolling stock ==
=== Locomotives ===
Key:	In service	Under overhaul/restoration	Stored	Static display

Number	Builder	Builder's number	Year built	Arrived at OSRRS	Notes
B10	Hudswell Clarke	1542	1924	1989	B10 was built for Sir W. G. Armstrong, Whitworth and Company, whose New Zealand office was in Tauranga, for the construction of the Waihi to Tauranga section of the North Island East Coast Main Trunk Railway. In 1930 it was sold to Milburn Cement for work on their siding with A 67. In 1967 the locomotive was sold to the Waitaki NZ's (now Alliance) Pukeuri Freezing Works for $1500. In 1988 it was leased to the Weka Pass Railway, but ended up being no use. In 1989 the OS&RRS provided D^{SA}s 218 and 234 on long-term loan to the freezing works and B10 was on loan to the society. The ownership changed in 2000 for the three locomotives. In 2007 B10 was taken out of service for its 10-year overhaul was due. The boiler as repaired at Scott's Engineering in Christchurch while its frame and other major parts were overhauled and reassembled. B10 returned to active service in May 2013 and in October the same year it was loaned to the Ashburton Railway & Preservation Society for the Rail 150 celebrations at The Plains Vintage Railway & Historical Museum. It has since returned to Oamaru and is used on passenger trains.
D^{SA} 234	Drewry	2432	1953	1989	TMS: DSA 387. Entered NZR service in June 1954 for shunting duties. Withdrawn in March 1981 and sold to the Ohai Railway Board, Ohai for shunting use for coal trains. It was later used as a source of parts as it was inoperable due to running without water in its engine. Used until July 1989 when it was for D^{SA} 218. It was sold to the OS&RRS in March 1989. Swapped for Hudswell Clarke built B10 from the Waitaki NZ's (now Alliance) Pukeuri Freezing Works, Pukeuri in October the same year. Used as spare parts for D^{SA} 218. Purchased by OS&RRS member Harry Andrew in 1999 and was transported back to the Oamaru railway in the same year. It was restored from 2004 to 2008 with major parts from D^{S} 214. D^{SA} 234 is in occasional service at Oamaru Steam & Rail.
PWD 535	John Fowler & Co.	15909	1921	1986	PWD 535 was built for the Department of Public Works in 1921. It was used until 1935 when it was purchased by Addison Corp Goldmine. Purchased again by the Oamaru Harbour Board in 1938 and used into the 1960s and was put up for display in the Oamaru Gardens. It was acquired in 1986 by the OS&RRS. Funding for restoration commenced in December 2013 with it being on static display on flat-deck wagon N^{F} 2075. Restoration has commenced with smaller parts being overhauled.
'Husky'	RSH	7908	1962	2009	'Husky' was built for the Wellington Meat Export Company in 1962. It was sold to Waitaki NZ's (now Alliance) Pukeuri Freezing Works, Pukeuri in 1975 and used until 2009. It was acquired by the OS&RRS in the same year. After arrival at Oamaru Steam and Rail, Husky received a full overhaul and is now used on passenger trains when B10 is not in use, and also as the main workshop shunter.
T^{R} 35	Drewry	2144	1939	1988	TMS: TR 223. It entered service for the New Zealand Railways Department in September 1939, was withdrawn in February 1988. T^{R} 35 was long used on passenger trains when B10 was not in use and as the main workshop shunter, but after the restoration of Husky it is now on standby as a backup and awaiting a full overhaul.
U^{C} 366	Sharp, Stewart & Co.	4750	1901	2009	Entered service in 1901 for the New Zealand Railways Department. Withdrawn and dumped in 1936 at the Oamaru locomotive dump. It was recovered by the OS&RRS in 2009 and is currently on Static Display.

In addition:

- The Ocean Beach Railway leased to the OS&RRS in 2009 their locomotive A 67 as a stand in for B10 while B10 was sidelined for its ten-year survey. It has since returned to the OBR.
- The OS&RRS had purchased D^{SA} 218 in 1989 and it arrived the same year and hauled trains on the line. It was swapped for B10 along with D^{SA} 234 in November the same year to the Waitaki NZ's (now Alliance) Pukeuri Freezing Works, Pukeuri. D^{SA} 218 is now owned by the Ashburton Railway & Preservation Society and is awaiting restoration at The Plains Vintage Railway & Historical Museum.
- K 92 from the Waimea Plains Railway came to Oamaru Steam & Rail in early 2007 where it regularly operated on their open days as another stand in for B10. It was moved to the Kingston Flyer in 2008.
- B10's former Pukeuri stablemate, D16, briefly visited Oamaru Steam and Rail in December 2017 for the filming of an episode of the BBC TV series 'Coast New Zealand' with Neil Oliver, and to run public trains around the harbour. D16 is now a resident at the Pleasant Point Railway.
- On the 18th of January 2024, DM 216 arrived there after a recent purchase from [The National Railway Museum of New Zealand]. They are going to convert it to diesel-electric.
