= Harold Purchas =

New Zealand archdeacon

Harold Purchas was Archdeacon of Timaru from 1928 to 1930.

He was educated at the University of New Zealand and ordained in 1896. After a curacy in Mount Somers he held incumbencies in Christchurch and Geraldine before his appointment as Archdeacon.
