= NZR Q class (1878) =

NZR Q Class (1878)
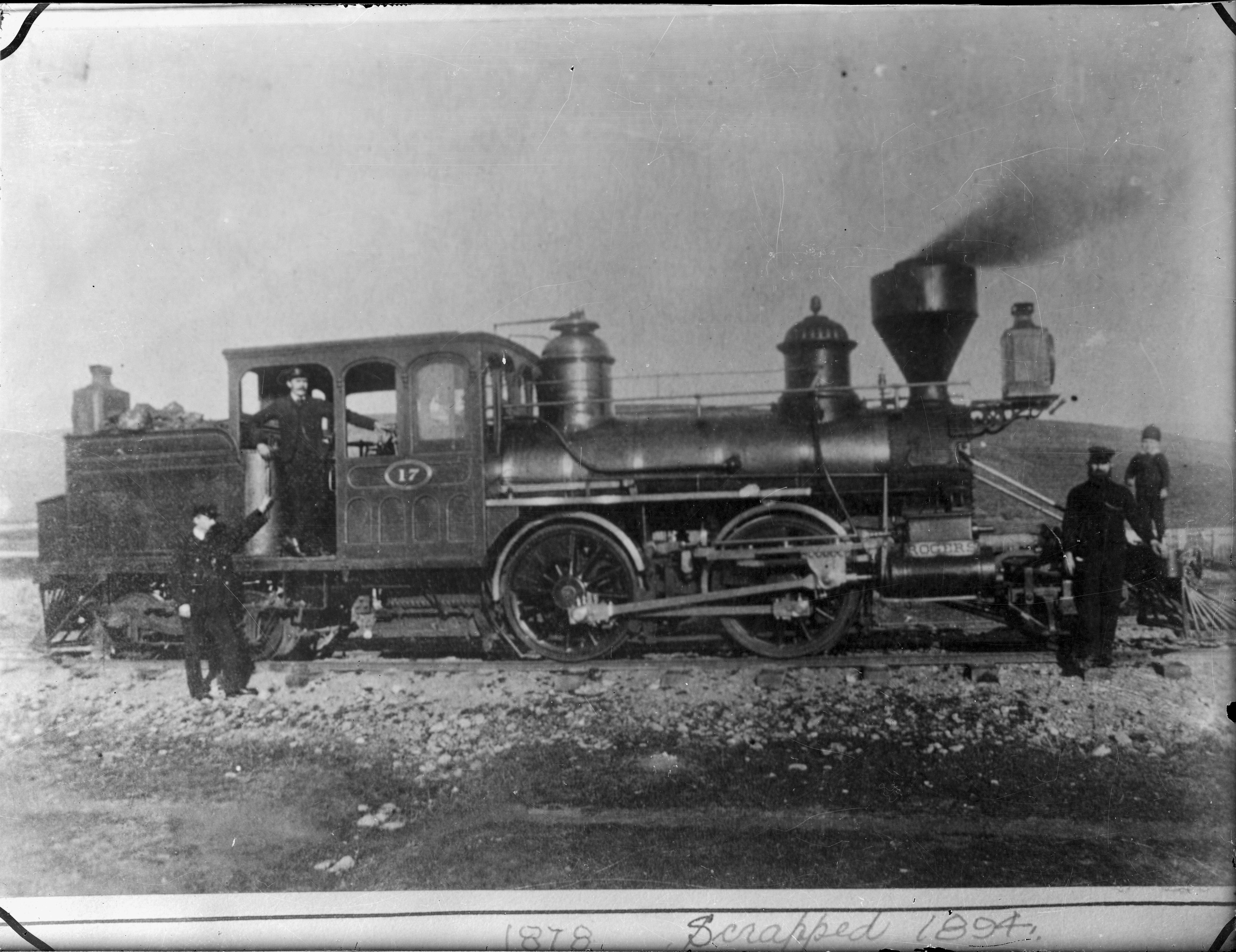
Type and origin
- Builder: Rogers
- Build date: 1878
- Total produced: 2
Specifications
- Configuration
  - Whyte: 2-4-4T
- Gauge: 3 ft 6 in (1,067 mm)
- Driver dia.: 48 in (1.219 m)
- Adhesive weight: 14.2 long tons (14.4 t; 15.9 short tons)
- Loco weight: 29 long tons (29.5 tonnes; 32.5 short tons)
- Fuel type: Coal
- Firebox
  - Grate area: 8 sq ft (0.74 m^{2})
- Boiler pressure: 130 lbf/in^{2} (896 kPa)
- Heating surface: 424 sq ft (39.4 m^{2})
- Cylinders: Two, outside
- Cylinder size: 11 in × 158 in (279 mm × 4,013 mm)
Performance figures
- Tractive effort: 4,062 lbf (18.07 kN)
Career
- Operators: Rakaia & Ashburton Forks Railway, NZR
- Class: Q
- Number in class: 2
- Numbers: 17, 51
- First run: August 1879
- Last run: March 31st 1897 (51) March 31st 1901 (17)
- Disposition: Both scrapped

The NZR Q class were a pair of 2-4-4T type tank engines built by Rogers Locomotive and Machine Works in New Jersey. They were similar, in appearance, to the earlier K class of the same manufacturer and were purchased by the Rakaia & Ashburton Forks Railway Company for working their newly constructed railway to Methven from Rakaia, which later became the Methven Branch. Q 51 was withdrawn in 1897 while Q 17 lasted until March 1901 with its number used for a UB class locomotive in April.

Table of withdrawals
Year	Quantity in service at start of year	Quantity withdrawn	Locomotive numbers	Notes
1897	1	1	51	
1901	2	2	17	

== See also ==
- NZR Q class (1901)
- NZR K class (1877)
- Locomotives of New Zealand
