= Bealey River =

River in South Island, New Zealand

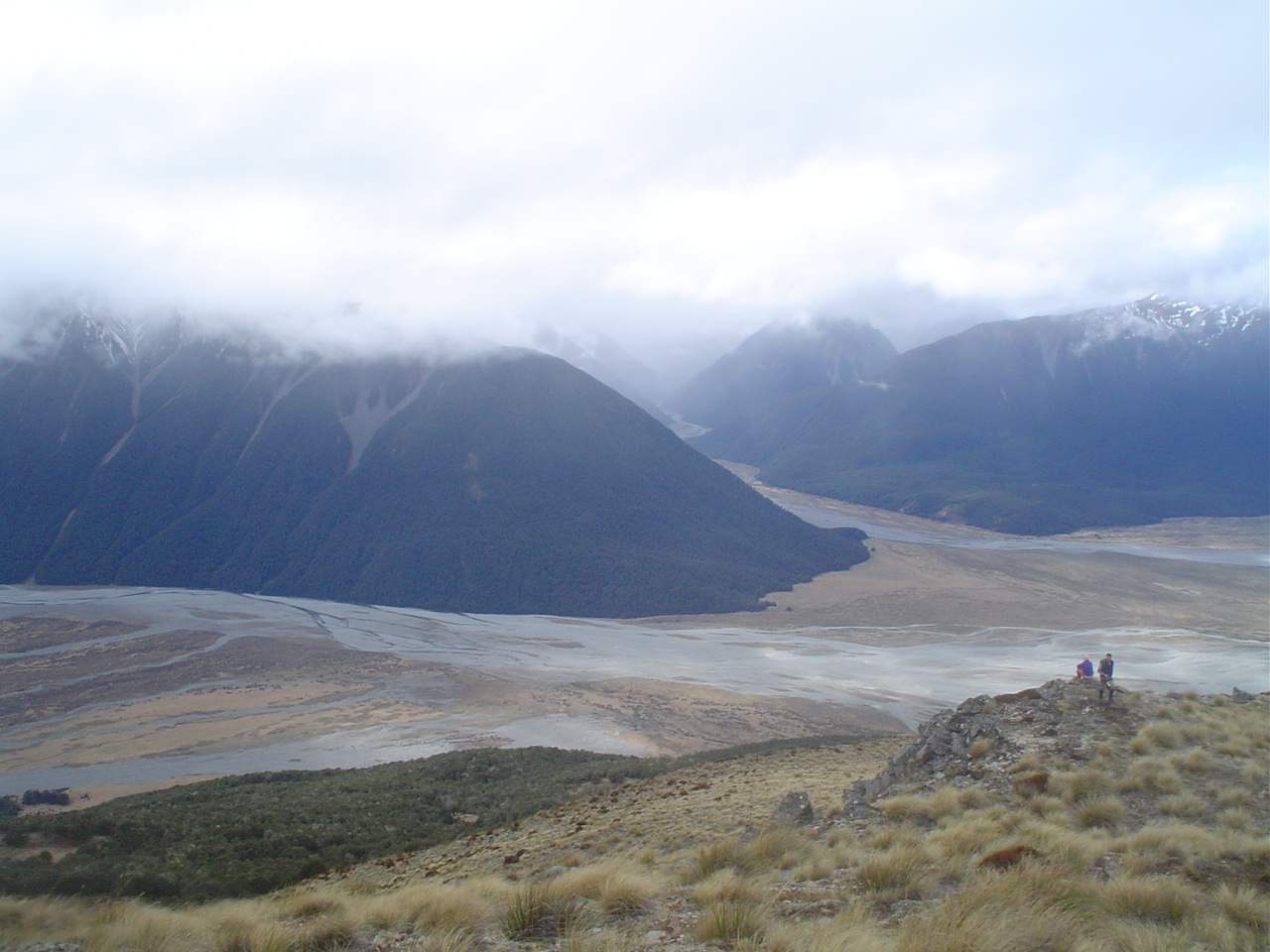
- The Bealey River runs towards the top of the photo in the centre. The Waimakariri River runs from left to right
- Route of the Bealey River
- Mouth of the Bealey River Bealey River (South Island)

Location
- Country: New Zealand

Physical characteristics
- Source
  - location: Goldney Glacier
  - coordinates: 42°54′59″S 171°31′44″E
- Mouth
  - location: Waimakariri River
  - coordinates: 43°00′13″S 171°35′37″E

Basin features
- Progression: Bealey River → Waimakariri River → Pegasus Bay → Pacific Ocean
- Tributaries
  - left: Twin Creek, Bridal Veil Creek, Devils Punchbowl Creek, Graham Stream, Bretts Stream, Mingha River
  - right: Margarets Tarn, McGrath Creek, Wardens Creek, Avalanche Creek, Rough Creek, Snow Creek, Halpin Creek, Greyneys Creek
- Bridges: White Bridge

The Bealey River is a small river located in the Southern Alps of New Zealand. It is a tributary of the Waimakariri River. Its valley forms the eastern approach to Arthur's Pass. The river and the Bealey settlement are named for Samuel Bealey, a 19th-century Superintendent of Canterbury Province and pastoralist.

== Locomotive dumpsite ==
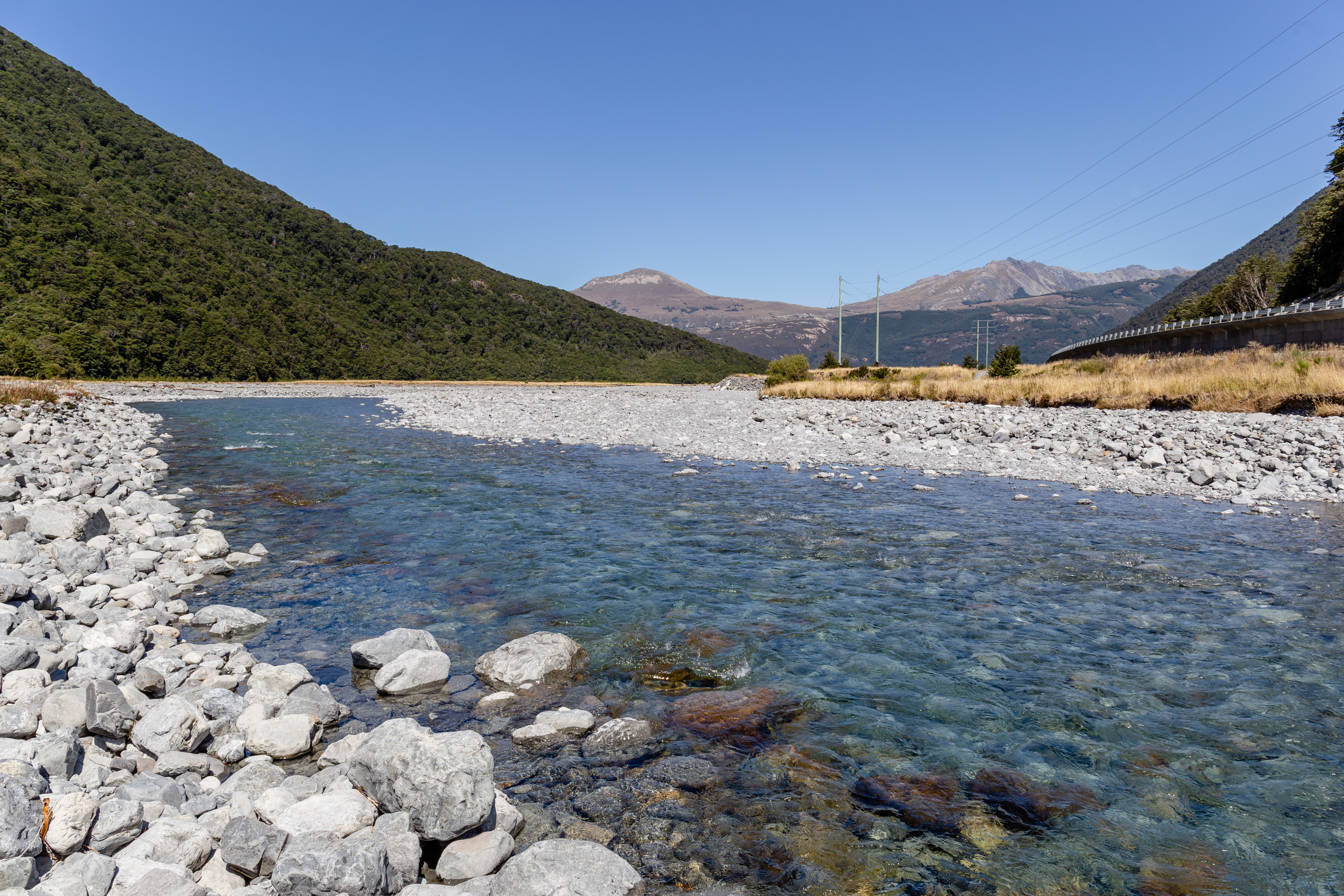
The Bealey River close to the township of Arthur's Pass

In the first half of the 20th century, the New Zealand Railways Department (NZR) dumped a number of withdrawn locomotives and wagons in the river to stabilise its banks and prevent erosion, particularly near the railway bridge across the Bealey River. Some of these locomotives and wagons have been recovered by heritage groups with the aim of restoring them to operating condition, including WMR No. 9 (later NZR N 453) by the Wellington and Manawatu Railway Trust in 2003. Most of the other locomotives and components have since been either buried or scrapped. The more substantially complete remains of ex-WMR No. 10 (later NZR N 454) are believed to be buried in the river bed near Cora Lynn, further up the river.

During the early 1920s, NZR used a former quarry near Cora Lynn station as an open-air workshop to strip locomotives of useful parts before they were dumped. This quarry was host to a number of locomotive parts including the frame of V 132, which had been retrofitted with Walschaerts valve gear in 1898 as an experiment by NZR. Shortly after this frame was salvaged in 1997–98, Tranz Rail and the Department of Conservation initiated a clean-up operation in the old quarry, burying many of the locomotive parts there into the access embankment.

Similarly, NZR used the Bealey River as a place to scrap old wooden passenger coaches in the 1950s and 1960s. These carriages would be brought from Addington Railway Workshops in Christchurch, shunted into the riverbed, and then burnt to recover their metal parts for scrap or as spares for other operating vehicles.

=== Other locomotive dumps ===
- Branxholme
- Mōkihinui River
- Oamaru
- Omoto
- Waimakariri River
- Westfield
- Mararoa

== Climate ==
Climate data for Bealey (1867–1880)
Month	Jan	Feb	Mar	Apr	May	Jun	Jul	Aug	Sep	Oct	Nov	Dec	Year
Record high °C (°F)	28.3 (82.9)	29.3 (84.7)	29.2 (84.6)	23.1 (73.6)	18.3 (64.9)	14.9 (58.8)	12.4 (54.3)	14.4 (57.9)	20.6 (69.1)	23.7 (74.7)	26.3 (79.3)	29.0 (84.2)	29.3 (84.7)
Mean maximum °C (°F)	26.5 (79.7)	25.9 (78.6)	23.0 (73.4)	19.1 (66.4)	15.1 (59.2)	12.3 (54.1)	10.2 (50.4)	10.8 (51.4)	16.0 (60.8)	19.6 (67.3)	22.3 (72.1)	24.3 (75.7)	27.5 (81.5)
Mean daily maximum °C (°F)	19.2 (66.6)	18.7 (65.7)	16.9 (62.4)	13.6 (56.5)	9.6 (49.3)	6.5 (43.7)	5.6 (42.1)	6.9 (44.4)	10.5 (50.9)	12.9 (55.2)	15.0 (59.0)	17.5 (63.5)	12.7 (54.9)
Daily mean °C (°F)	13.9 (57.0)	13.5 (56.3)	12.2 (54.0)	9.3 (48.7)	5.7 (42.3)	2.8 (37.0)	1.8 (35.2)	3.0 (37.4)	6.0 (42.8)	8.3 (46.9)	10.2 (50.4)	12.7 (54.9)	8.3 (46.9)
Mean daily minimum °C (°F)	8.6 (47.5)	8.3 (46.9)	7.5 (45.5)	5.0 (41.0)	1.9 (35.4)	−0.8 (30.6)	−2.0 (28.4)	−0.7 (30.7)	1.6 (34.9)	3.7 (38.7)	5.4 (41.7)	8.0 (46.4)	3.9 (39.0)
Mean minimum °C (°F)	2.7 (36.9)	2.1 (35.8)	0.3 (32.5)	−1.8 (28.8)	−4.7 (23.5)	−8.6 (16.5)	−9.9 (14.2)	−7.1 (19.2)	−3.9 (25.0)	−2.7 (27.1)	−0.5 (31.1)	0.9 (33.6)	−11.8 (10.8)
Record low °C (°F)	0.6 (33.1)	−0.6 (30.9)	−1.7 (28.9)	−3.6 (25.5)	−10.6 (12.9)	−15.1 (4.8)	−18.9 (−2.0)	−10.3 (13.5)	−5.6 (21.9)	−9.6 (14.7)	−2.2 (28.0)	−3.9 (25.0)	−18.9 (−2.0)
Average rainfall mm (inches)	114.6 (4.51)	112.6 (4.43)	149.1 (5.87)	131.2 (5.17)	169.4 (6.67)	142.9 (5.63)	147.3 (5.80)	166.8 (6.57)	185.8 (7.31)	193.5 (7.62)	163.0 (6.42)	168.0 (6.61)	1,844.2 (72.61)
Source: NIWA (rainfall 1871-1900)
