= Oamaru locomotive dump =

Reuse of obsolete locomotives in New Zealand

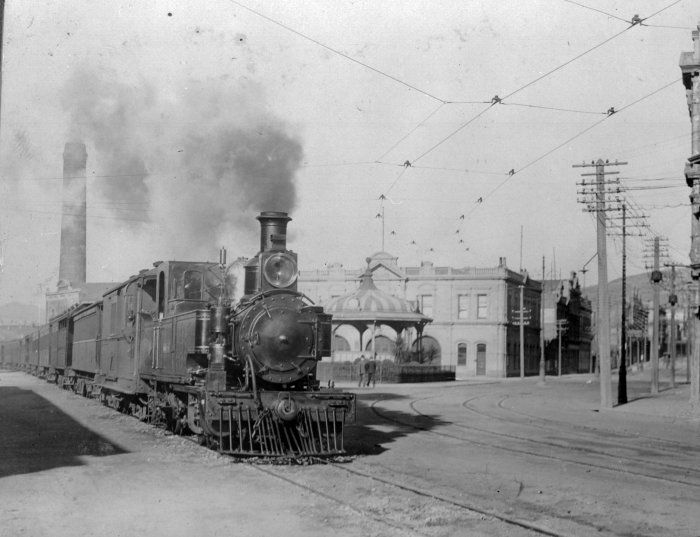
At least one NZR R class Fairlie locomotive, R 271, was dumped at Oamaru in 1930.

Oamaru locomotive dump was created in New Zealand so that obsolete locomotives and rolling stock could be used to stabilise loose ground where rivers and the coast were eroding the ground where the railway lines were built. This was done at a time when scrap steel was an uneconomic proposition. It was located on the coastline in the North Otago town of Oamaru to stabilise land used by New Zealand Railways for their freight yards. Here the coastline of the Pacific Ocean pounded heavily against the land causing major erosion.

== Oamaru locomotive dumpsite ==
By 1930, New Zealand Railways was facing issues with erosion of the Oamaru railway yard by breakers from the Pacific Ocean. Despite the construction of a mole to make the Oamaru harbour more suitable for shipping, this provided no protection for the railway land. As NZR had withdrawn a number of obsolete steam locomotives and scrap prices were low, the decision was made to dump some of these locomotives at Oamaru as erosion control.

The dumpsite was well known to railway enthusiasts, who would visit the site at low tide to view the remains of the locomotives. In 2002, enthusiast Tony Bachelor salvaged the remains of Brooks U^{B} 17 and 1898-built Baldwin U^{B} 282 for his Hooterville Charitable Steam Trust. Due to Hooterville's closure in 2005, the locomotives have since languished on the site of the old Waitara railway yards and are visible from Johnstone Street, Waitara.

In 2008 the dumpsite was threatened again by the sea, and OnTrack began work in June of that year to shore the bank back up. As a part of this, most of the remains of the dump site were removed from the foreshore with some handed over to the Oamaru Steam and Rail Restoration Society for safekeeping. Today the dump site is largely non-existent although the remains of at least 1 Canterbury J Class engine is still in place on the foreshore, having never been recovered for an unknown reason.

== Locomotives dumped at Oamaru ==
The following is a list of locomotives known to have been dumped at Oamaru - in addition, many miscellaneous parts were also dumped at the site.

Class and Road number	Type	Builder	Builder's number	Notes
F 156	0-6-0	Vulcan Foundry	1181	Fell onto foreshore in 1937 during shunting accident. Recovered, but deemed irreparable and dumped permanently on foreshore.
J 15	2-6-0	Vulcan Foundry	1000	
J 82	2-6-0	Avonside Engine Company	1040	
J 83	2-6-0	Avonside Engine Company	1039	
J 117	2-6-0	Neilson and Company	2462	
J 121	2-6-0	Robert Stephenson and Company	2368	
R 271	0-6-4T	Avonside Engine Company	1219	Single Fairlie Driving bogie recovered.
RM 6	Bo-Bo	Edison	unknown	Battery-Electric railcar, bogies only dumped. Bogie remains are stored at Ferrymead Railway
U^{A} 175	4-6-0	Sharp, Stewart and Company	4506	
U^{B} 17	4-6-0	Brooks Locomotive Works	3925	Retrieved (minus tender); on display at Waitara
U^{B} 282	4-6-0	Baldwin Locomotive Works	16046	Retrieved (minus tender); on display at Waitara
U^{C} 366	4-6-0	Sharp, Stewart and Company	4750	Retrieved; on display at Oamaru.
W^{A} 120	2-6-2T	Robert Stephenson and Company	2367	Only known survivor of the J class tank locomotive conversions

Not all of the above existed on the foreshore by the time OnTrack removed the remains in 2008 - some locomotives had been destroyed by wave and rust action, or in at least one case believed to have been sucked out to sea (F 156). None of the locomotives that remained on the foreshore were in a state suitable for restoration due to the harsh salt environment.

== Other locomotive dump sites ==
- Westfield, Auckland
- Omoto
- Beaumont
- Branxholme
- Mararoa
- Bealey River
- Waimakariri River
- Mōkihinui River
