= Tinwald, New Zealand =

Tinwald
- Suburb
- Interactive map of Tinwald
- Coordinates: 43°55′S 171°43′E
- Country: New Zealand
- City: Ashburton
- Local authority: Ashburton District Council
- Electoral ward: Ashburton

Area
  - Land: 470 ha (1,200 acres)

Population (June 2025)
  - Total: 4,000
  - Density: 850/km^{2} (2,200/sq mi)

| Lagmhor | | Ashburton Central |
| Maronan | Tinwald | Hampstead |
| Willowby | | Huntingdon |

Tinwald is a town in Canterbury, New Zealand, located approximately 3 kilometres (1.9 miles) south of Ashburton, from which it is separated by the Ashburton River / Hakatere. The town was named after Tinwald Downs in Scotland, birthplace of an early European resident and owner of much of the land, Robert Wilkin.

Prominent former citizens of Tinwald include William Massey, who was Prime Minister of New Zealand from 1912 to 1925.

The Main South Line section of the South Island Main Trunk Railway runs through Tinwald, and from 1878 until 1968, the town acted as the junction for the Mount Somers Branch. The first 2.5 kilometres (1.6 miles) of the branch line at the Tinwald end are now preserved by The Plains Vintage Railway & Historical Museum, who regularly operate public open days. The Railway is particularly notable for K 88, a locomotive recovered in 19 and 20 January 1974 from where it was dumped in the Ōreti River and returned to full operating condition in 1982. It still operates services on The Plains Railway today.

Tinwald has several shops spanning its main road including several cafés, a pub and a supermarket.

== History ==
European settlement of the area began in 1873 when Robert Wilkin purchased 900 acres as a base for dealing in stock throughout the area. He named it Tinwald Downs after his Scottish birthplace.

== Demographics ==
Tinwald covers 4.70 km^{2} (1.81 sq mi). It had an estimated population of 4,000 as of June 2025, with a population density of 851 people per km^{2}.

Historical population
| Year | Pop. | ±% p.a. |
|---|---|---|
| 2006 | 2,994 | — |
| 2013 | 3,246 | +1.16% |
| 2018 | 3,558 | +1.85% |
| 2023 | 3,756 | +1.09% |

Tinwald had a population of 3,756 in the 2023 New Zealand census, an increase of 198 people (5.6%) since the 2018 census, and an increase of 510 people (15.7%) since the 2013 census. There were 1,857 males, 1,893 females, and 9 people of other genders in 1,476 dwellings. 2.2% of people identified as LGBTIQ+. The median age was 41.2 years (compared with 38.1 years nationally). There were 693 people (18.5%) aged under 15 years, 585 (15.6%) aged 15 to 29, 1,671 (44.5%) aged 30 to 64, and 807 (21.5%) aged 65 or older.

People could identify as more than one ethnicity. The results were 85.2% European (Pākehā); 8.6% Māori; 5.1% Pasifika; 6.7% Asian; 1.4% Middle Eastern, Latin American and African New Zealanders (MELAA); and 1.9% other, which includes people giving their ethnicity as "New Zealander". English was spoken by 97.0%, Māori by 1.2%, Samoan by 1.5%, and other languages by 6.8%. No language could be spoken by 2.1% (e.g. too young to talk). New Zealand Sign Language was known by 0.4%. The percentage of people born overseas was 15.7, compared with 28.8% nationally.

Religious affiliations were 34.2% Christian, 0.7% Hindu, 1.0% Islam, 0.4% Māori religious beliefs, 0.6% Buddhist, 0.4% New Age, and 0.9% other religions. People who answered that they had no religion were 53.6%, and 8.3% of people did not answer the census question.

Of those at least 15 years old, 297 (9.7%) people had a bachelor's or higher degree, 1,764 (57.6%) had a post-high school certificate or diploma, and 1,005 (32.8%) people exclusively held high school qualifications. The median income was $40,000, compared with $41,500 nationally. 195 people (6.4%) earned over $100,000 compared to 12.1% nationally. The employment status of those at least 15 was 1,557 (50.8%) full-time, 438 (14.3%) part-time, and 60 (2.0%) unemployed.

Individual statistical areas
| Name | Area (km^{2}) | Population | Density (per km^{2}) | Dwellings | Median age | Median income |
|---|---|---|---|---|---|---|
| Tinwald North | 1.90 | 1,461 | 769 | 582 | 40.9 years | $46,500 |
| Tinwald South | 2.79 | 2,295 | 823 | 894 | 41.4 years | $36,800 |
| New Zealand | | | | | 38.1 years | $41,500 |

== Education ==
Tinwald School is a coeducational state contributing primary school (years 1-6). It has a roll of 263 students as of .July 2026 It first opened in 1879.
