= Mount Somers Branch =

Overview
- Other name(s): Springburn Branch
- Status: Closed
- Owner: NZ Railways Department
- Locale: Canterbury, New Zealand
- Termini: Tinwald; Mount Somers
- Stations: 10

Service
- Type: Heavy rail
- System: New Zealand Government Railways (NZGR)
- Operator(s): NZ Railways Department

History
- Opened: 1878
- Opened to Springburn: 1889
- Closed beyond Mount Somers: 1957
- Closed: 1968

Technical
- Line length: 35.6 kilometres (22.1 mi)
- Number of tracks: Single
- Character: Rural
- Track gauge: 3 ft 6 in (1,067 mm)

Map

The Mount Somers Branch, sometimes known as the Springburn Branch, was a branch line railway in the region of Canterbury, New Zealand. The line was built in stages from 1878, reaching Mount Somers in 1885. A further section to Springburn was added in 1889; this closed in 1957, followed by the rest of the line in 1968. A portion has been preserved as the Plains Vintage Railway.

== Construction ==
Unlike many other rural branch lines in New Zealand, this line was not built for the sole purpose of opening up land for agriculture, as there were significant deposits of lignite coal and limestone in the hills behind the town of Mount Somers. Construction commenced in May 1878, with the line leaving the Main South Line at Tinwald, the southernmost suburb of Ashburton. With the onset of the Long Depression looming, the construction work on the line provided valuable employment, and as it was built, it was progressively opened. The first 13.39 km to Westerfield were opened on 15 April 1880, followed by Anama, 30.9 km from the junction, on 3 October 1882, and then Cavendish on 1 March 1884, 35.02 km from Tinwald.

Although it had been decided to terminate the line on the south bank of the South Ashburton River, another 2.58 km was built to Mount Somers, opening on 4 October 1885. An extension of 5.57 km to Springburn was opened on 9 September 1889, bringing the line to its full length to 43.17 km.

In 1886, a privately owned narrow-gauge bush tramway was built into the hills behind Mount Somers to serve coal mines and a limeworks. This line operated until 1963, though after 1943 it was closed beyond the limeworks.

== Stations ==
The following stations were on the Mount Somers Branch (in brackets is the distance from the junction at Tinwald):

- Lagmhor (8.13 km)
- Westerfield (13.39 km)
- Hackthorne (17.92 km)
- Punawai (21.69 km)
- Valetta (26.56 km)
- Anama (30.9 km)
- Cavendish (35.02 km)
- Mount Somers (37.6 km)
- Buccleugh (?? km)
- Springburn (43.17 km)

== Operation ==
For roughly half a century a daily mixed train operated on the line. Besides coal and limestone, important commodities on the line were grain, livestock, and silica sand that was railed to a glassworks in the Christchurch suburb of Hornby, served by the Southbridge Branch. At one point in the 19th century, as tractors displaced horses on farms in the area, substantial traffic came from the transport of horses to the North Island, where the terrain was too steep for tractors of the era to handle.

As road transportation improved in the 20th century, the line's importance slipped. Passenger traffic, in particular, had markedly declined from a peak of 18,000-25,000 passengers per annum in the late 19th century, and as it was no longer viable the passenger service was withdrawn on 9 January 1933. World War II generated increased traffic for the line, especially as there was a military camp located in Westerfield, but after the war ended conditions returned to their pre-war status. In 1951, the freight trains were reduced to twice a week and they now commenced in Ashburton rather than at the branch's terminus. Closure of the short section to Springburn had been suggested as early as 1930 and this finally occurred on 29 March 1957, with full closure of the line on 1 January 1968. Wheat was railed from Valetta until April 1968.

The first 2.5 kilometres of the line from the junction at Tinwald to the Frasers Road crossing survive as The Plains Vintage Railway & Historical Museum.

== The branch today ==
Some of the formation, including embankments and cuttings, survive, while in other places it has been obliterated, often by farming activity. Goods sheds survive at Mount Somers, along with a couple of loading banks, and at Valetta, where some ballast is still in place on the formation of a siding. The site of the Westerfield yard retains a couple of loading banks, there are bridge abutments at various points, and about a kilometre from Westerfield School a couple of sleepers can be found.
