= Mount Somers =

- Rural settlement
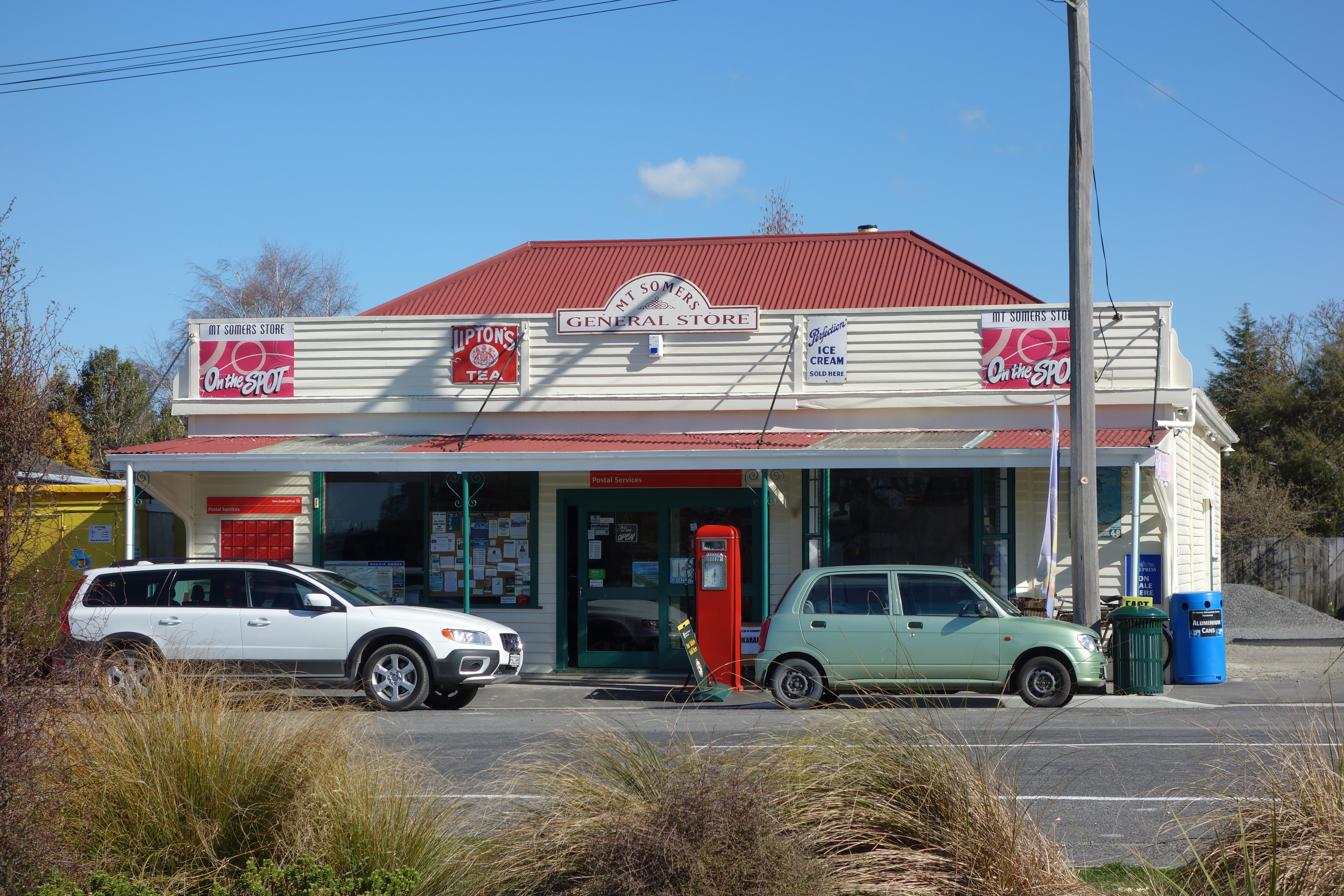
- Mount Somers General Store
- Interactive map of Mount Somers
- Coordinates: 43°43′32″S 171°24′0″E
- Country: New Zealand
- Region: Canterbury
- Territorial authority: Ashburton District
- Ward: Western
- Electorates: Rangitata; Te Tai Tonga (Māori)

Government
  - Territorial authority: Ashburton District Council
  - Regional council: Environment Canterbury
  - Mayor of Ashburton: Liz McMillan
  - Rangitata MP: James Meager
  - Te Tai Tonga MP: Tākuta Ferris

Area
  - Total: 2.60 km^{2} (1.00 sq mi)

Population (June 2025)
  - Total: 250
  - Density: 96/km^{2} (250/sq mi)

Mount Somers (Māori: Te Kiekie) is a small town in Canterbury, New Zealand, nestled in the foothills of the Southern Alps. The population in the 2021 census was 160. Due to its scenic location, it has seen growth in the number of holiday homes.

Unlike many country towns in New Zealand, Mount Somers' economy has not been solely agricultural. Coal, clay, sand, and limestone have been mined in the hills behind the town, and from 1885 until 1968 the community and its industries were served by the Mount Somers Branch railway from the Main South Line. From 1889 to 1957 an extension ran to Springburn, and the branch was sometimes known as the Springburn Branch. From Mount Somers railway station a private bush tramway ran into the hills behind the town, providing access to the various industrial operations there. Relics of both the railway and tramway are still visible today.

Mount Somers is famous amongst the international experimental and underground music communities as it is the home of Peter King and his lathe cut record business. Peter hand cuts records onto polycarbonate plastic one at a time using an old BBC lathe and also home made record cutting heads.

== Demographics ==
Mount Somers is described by Statistics New Zealand as a rural settlement, and covers 2.60 km^{2} (1.0 sq mi). It had an estimated population of 250 as of June 2025, with a population density of 96 people per km^{2}. It is part of the Ashburton Forks statistical area.

Historical population
Year	Pop.	±% p.a.
2006	117	—
2013	135	+2.07%
2018	147	+1.72%
2023	207	+7.09%

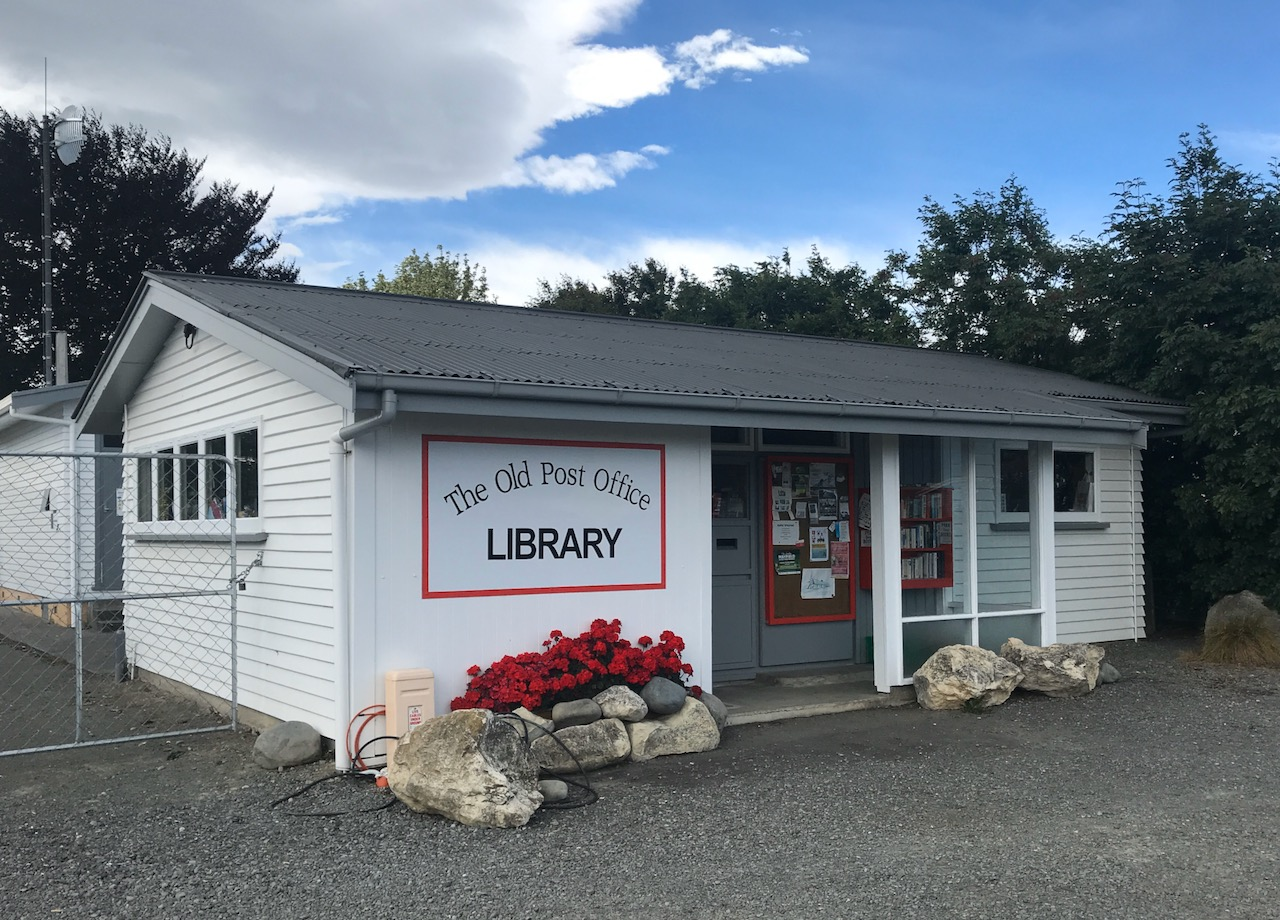
Mount Somers Library

Mount Somers had a population of 207 in the 2023 New Zealand census, an increase of 60 people (40.8%) since the 2018 census, and an increase of 72 people (53.3%) since the 2013 census. There were 108 males and 96 females in 93 dwellings. 2.9% of people identified as LGBTIQ+. The median age was 43.2 years (compared with 38.1 years nationally). There were 42 people (20.3%) aged under 15 years, 24 (11.6%) aged 15 to 29, 102 (49.3%) aged 30 to 64, and 39 (18.8%) aged 65 or older.

People could identify as more than one ethnicity. The results were 92.8% European (Pākehā), 8.7% Māori, 4.3% Pasifika, 2.9% Asian, and 5.8% other, which includes people giving their ethnicity as "New Zealander". English was spoken by 100.0%, Māori by 1.4%, Samoan by 1.4%, and other languages by 4.3%. The percentage of people born overseas was 15.9, compared with 28.8% nationally.

Religious affiliations were 36.2% Christian, and 1.4% New Age. People who answered that they had no religion were 53.6%, and 8.7% of people did not answer the census question.

Of those at least 15 years old, 33 (20.0%) people had a bachelor's or higher degree, 90 (54.5%) had a post-high school certificate or diploma, and 45 (27.3%) people exclusively held high school qualifications. The median income was $40,800, compared with $41,500 nationally. 15 people (9.1%) earned over $100,000 compared to 12.1% nationally. The employment status of those at least 15 was 93 (56.4%) full-time, 33 (20.0%) part-time, and 3 (1.8%) unemployed.

== Education ==
Mt Somers Springburn School is a full primary school catering for years 1 to 8. It has 78 students as of July 2026. The school opened in 1876.
