= NZR K class (1877) =

Class of 2-4-2 steam locomotives

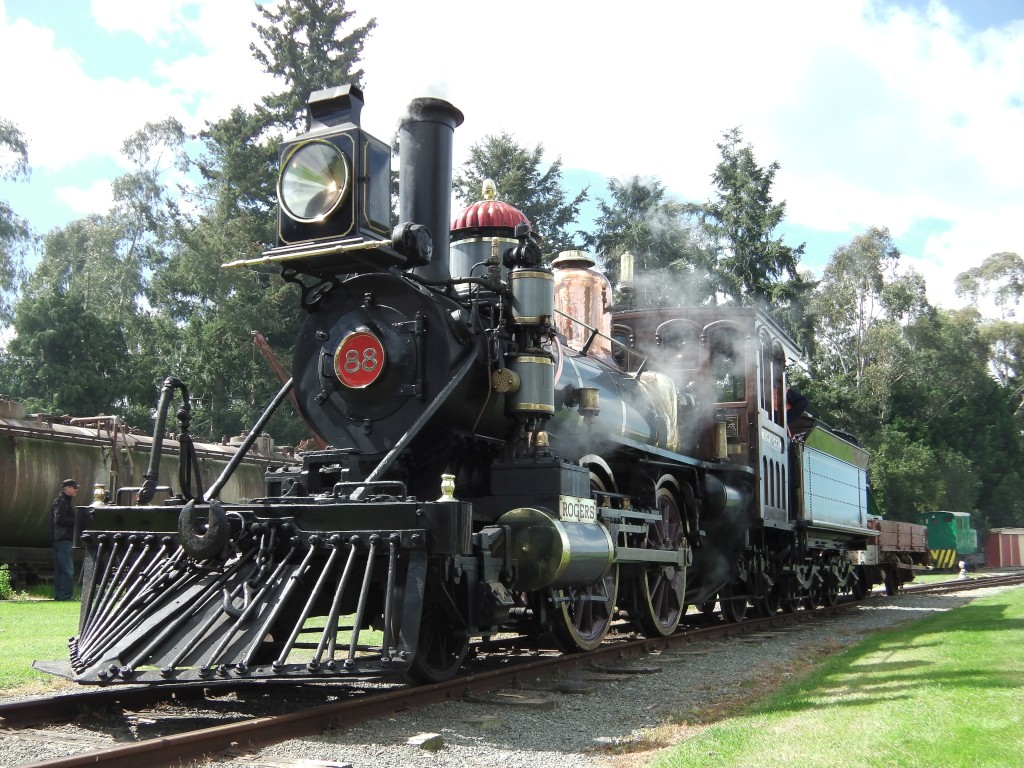
- K 88 at The Plains Railway in 2013.
Type and origin
- Power type: Steam
- Builder: Rogers Locomotive Works, New Jersey, USA
- Serial number: 2454–2455; 2469 – 2474
- Build date: 1877–1878
- Total produced: 8
Specifications
- Configuration
  - Whyte: 2-4-2
  - UIC: 1′B1′ n2
- Gauge: 3 ft 6 in (1,067 mm)
- Leading dia.: 30.25 in (768 mm)
- Driver dia.: 48 in (1,219 mm)
- Trailing dia.: 30.25 in (768 mm)
- Length: 45 ft 7 in (13.89 m)
- Adhesive weight: 14.8 long tons (15.0 t; 16.6 short tons)
- Loco weight: 23.3 long tons (23.7 t; 26.1 short tons)
- Tender weight: 19.2 long tons (19.5 t; 21.5 short tons)
- Total weight: 42.5 long tons (43.2 t; 47.6 short tons)
- Fuel type: Coal
- Fuel capacity: 2.2 long tons (2.24 t; 2.46 short tons)
- Water cap.: 1,250 imp gal (5,700 L; 1,500 US gal)
- Firebox
  - Grate area: 8.8 sq ft (0.82 m^{2}) (Original) 10.2 sq ft (0.95 m^{2}) (Re-boilered)
- Boiler pressure: 130 psi (896 kPa) (Original) 160 psi (1,103 kPa) (Re-boilered)
- Heating surface: 589 sq ft (54.7 m^{2})
- Cylinders: Two
- Cylinder size: 12 in × 20 in (305 mm × 508 mm)
- Valve gear: Stephenson link motion
- Valve type: Slide valves
- Valve travel: 4 in (102 mm)
- Valve lap: 0.9375 in (24 mm)
- Valve lead: 0.09375 in (2 mm)
Performance figures
- Tractive effort: 6,240 lbf (27.8 kN) (Original) 7,500 lbf (33 kN) (Re-boilered)
Career
- Class: K
- Numbers: 87–88; 92 – 97
- First run: 9 March 1878
- Last run: June 1927
- Preserved: 3
- Disposition: 3 preserved, 5 scrapped

The NZR K class of 1877 was the first example of American-built locomotives to be used on New Zealand's rail network. Their success coloured locomotive development in New Zealand until the end of steam.

== History ==
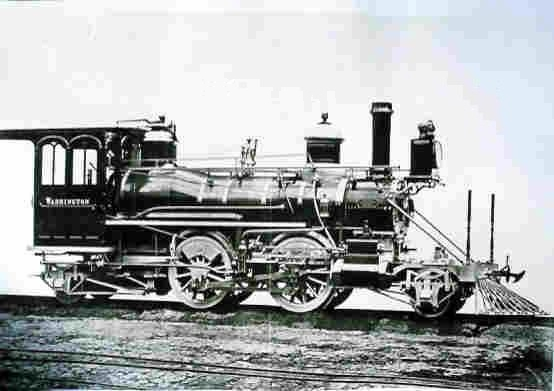
Builders photo of K 88 without tender.

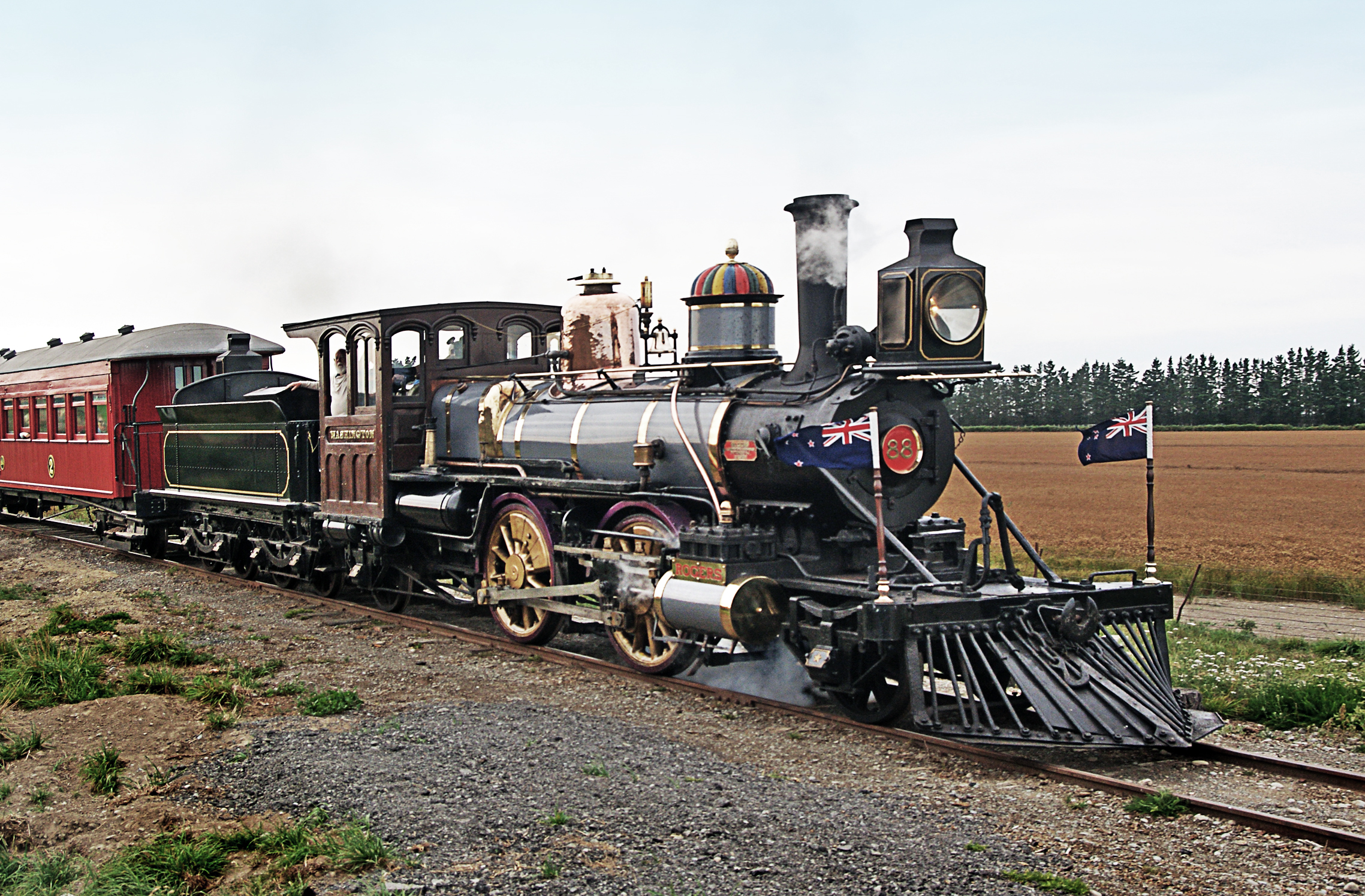
Rogers K 88

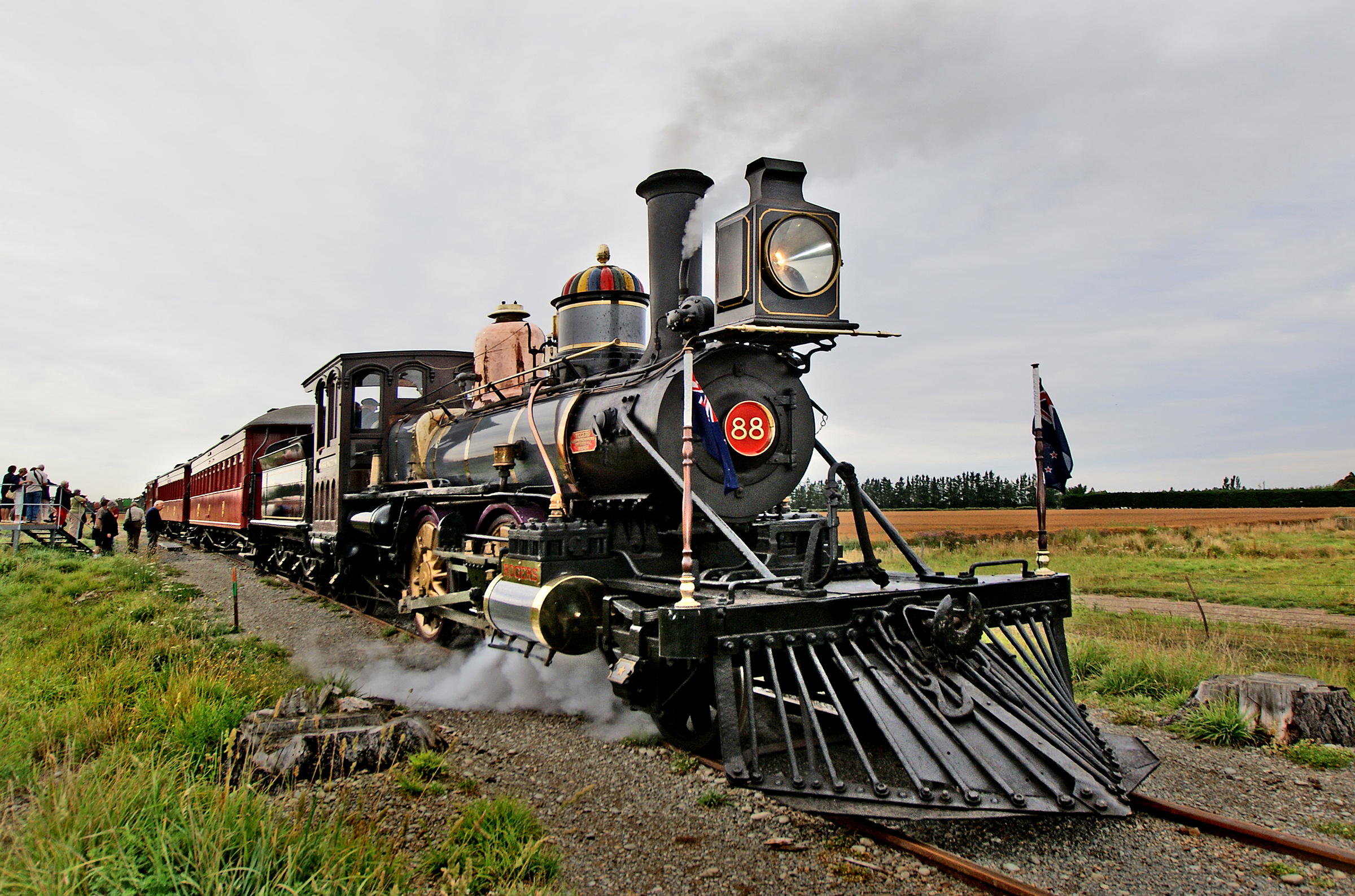
Washington K88

In 1877, the new Chief Mechanical Engineer of the NZR, Allison D. Smith, required additional motive power for the fledgling Government system. It had been intended to order more J Class locomotives that were of English design. American civil engineer Walton W. Evans had been promoting the advantages of United States-built engines to railways of South America and further abroad. His efforts, having secured an order of two locomotives for Australia's Victorian Railways the previous year, had enticed Smith (see Vogel railways), and an order was placed with the Rogers Locomotive Works of New Jersey, for two tender locomotives with a 2-4-2 wheel arrangement. The initial two Rogers locomotives were ordered prior to Smith's appointment as Locomotive Engineer on 10 April 1877 (he had been manager of the Wellington section), and were ordered through Evans. The locomotives were described by R.D. Grant as having the design hallmarks of Roger's Superintendent William H. Hudson, with his truck design innovations and his patented compensated springing throughout from the front bissel truck to the driving wheel springs and to the rear swinging truck.

Upon their arrival to New Zealand, the locomotives attracted attention with their bar frames, Gothic-style wooden cabs, locomotive bell, ornate embellishments and rakish appearances, which were at odds with the traditional English locomotive appearance in New Zealand at the time and were described by journalist Charles Rous-Marten as "a watch with all its works outside". One Christchurch paper suggested that they needed a glass case to protect them from the weather. They looked flimsy because of the bar frames rather than the heavier plate frames of the J's. In addition, this first pair, K 87 "Lincoln" and K 88 "Washington", reputedly wore a brightly coloured livery of green, blue, yellow, red, purple, and gold in addition to their Russian Iron boiler jackets. The Baldwin and Rogers locomotives reflected the styling adopted in the 1870s by American builders with elements from the Renaissance Revival and Neo-Baroque architectural styles, and with Islamic Moorish (from Alhambra) influences. Bold colours and painted decorations were used.

== In service ==
After arrival in the South Island at Lyttelton, the locomotives were quickly put into service. K 87 "Lincoln" quickly distinguished itself by hauling the first bogie-carriage passenger train, and both the locomotives soon earned a reputation as fast and free runners with mild coal consumption. K 88 "Washington" hauled the first train between Christchurch and Dunedin in 1878 on the newly opened Main South Line, assisted by the Double Fairlie "Josephine" south of Oamaru until "Josephine" had to be taken off the train due to mechanical issues – caused by how K 88 was being driven. Six more of the class was ordered from the Rogers Locomotive Works, numbered 92 to 97 before K's 87 and 88 had entered service – the former being ordered in January 1878 while the latter entered service in March that year, such was Allison Smith's faith in the class he had ordered.

The railway authorities regarded the first two K's as "infinitely superior to the English locomotives" operating at the same time. The second batch of locomotives entered service in the South Island and were almost identical to the first two engines, albeit with no names and a more conventional livery (it is likely K 87 and K 88 had been repainted by this time as well). In 1883, the K class was the only engine class officially permitted to run at 35 mph (56 km/h) in ordinary service.

As more powerful locomotives arrived on the railway system, increasingly from the American Baldwin Locomotive Works, the K class became relegated from the top expresses down to express trains on secondary lines. Two of the K's, K 93 and K 96, were transferred to the North Island during this time. Starting after 1900 the class received new NZR-built boilers to replace their Rogers-built wagon-top boiler. The South Island locomotives gained boilers with a Belpaire firebox, while the North Island pair received round-top boilers. All new boilers were pressed to 160 psi (1,100 kPa), compared to their original 130 psi (900 kPa). By this time, the class had also received Westinghouse brake equipment. It was during this time that some of the K class, having been relegated to the Kingston-Gore branch, gained a reputation for the Kingston-Invercargill express train which earned the name "Kingston Flyer".

== Withdrawal and disposal ==
The K class was gradually withdrawn from service in the early 1920s. Both the North Island examples, plus K 87 "Lincoln" had been withdrawn as early as 1922. The others remained in operation for a few more years, with K 92 and K 95 not withdrawn until 1927. As was customary at the same time, the locomotives were not immediately scrapped but set aside for disposal. All remaining South Island engines lasted long enough to be dumped as embankment protection starting in 1926.

== Preservation ==
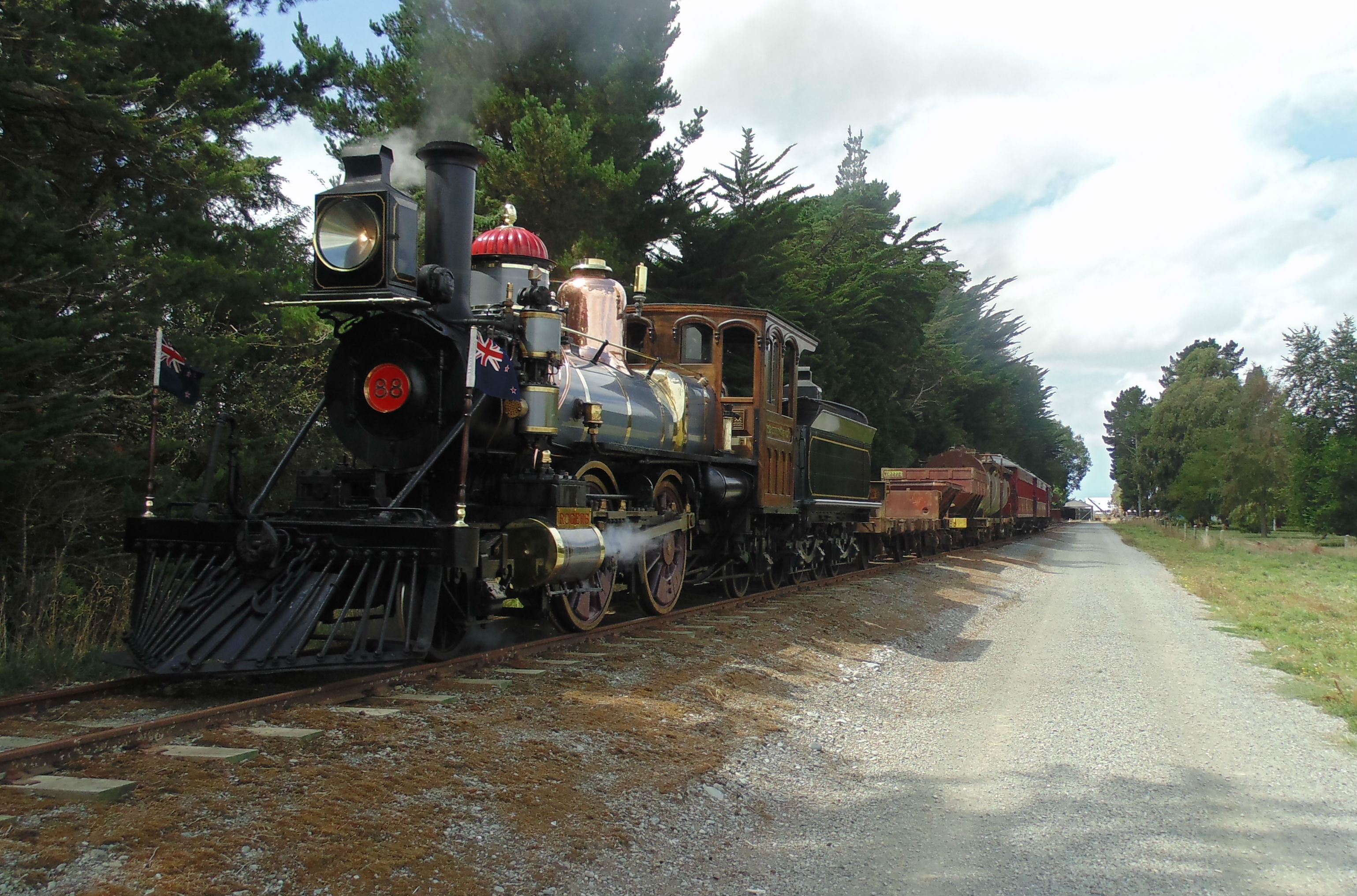
Rogers K 88 at The Plains Vintage Railway & Historical Museum

Three of the Rogers K class have so far been exhumed and entered into preservation. The first and most notable of these locomotives is K 88 Washington, which was removed from the river by the Southland Vintage Car Club on 19 and 20 January 1974. There were a number of loose plans regarding the locomotive's future but these came to nothing. The locomotive wreck was nearly put back into the riverbank until The Plains Vintage Railway & Historical Museum proposed to restore it back to working order.

Starting in July 1974 they completed restoration on the 7 November 1981, proving that restoring other buried locomotive was feasible. It was recommissioned on the 25 November the following year. However on 24 September 1987 K 88's boiler (which was recovered from the Oreti River) was condemned, and it was not until 30 March 2002 that K 88 was once again in working order, this time with a new Belpaire-style all-welded boiler and wearing an approximation of the original colourful livery.

The other two locomotives also unearthed are K 94, removed by a private owner and moved to The Plains Railway on 21 April 1986 (currently unrestored in storage with no active plans for restoration) and K 92, recovered in 1985 by the Fiordland Vintage Machinery Club for their Museum's railway on the shores of Lake Te Anau. Partially restored in Te Anau, the venture fell through before the locomotive had been fully completed and it was subsequently put up for sale, with the restoration being completed in Dunedin. Purchased by Colin Smith in 1998, the K 92's restoration was completed with intent to recreate the old "Kingston Flyer" trains of the early 1900s at the Waimea Plains Railway. While waiting for the railway to be completed, K 92 visited a number of railways in the South Island, with some of the more notable visits being those to the Kingston Flyer route, where it triple headed with the two A^{B} class locomotives present there. It also visited K 88 at the Plains Railway, where both locomotives were used together extensively.

== See also ==
- NZR Q class of 1877
- NZR K class of 1932
- NZR KA class
- NZR KB class
- Locomotives of New Zealand
