= Ashburton District Council =

Coordinates: 43.9025642°S 171.7455007°E

Type
- Term limits: None

History
- Founded: 6 March 1989

Leadership
- Mayor: Liz McMillan

Structure
- Seats: 10 (1 mayor, 9 ward seats)
- Length of term: 3 years

Website
- ashburtondc.govt.nz

Ashburton District Council is the territorial authority for the Ashburton District of New Zealand. The council consists of the mayor of Ashburton and nine ward councillors.

The current mayor is Liz McMillan.

== Composition ==
The councillors are elected from three wards: five from the Ashburton ward, and two each from the Eastern and Western wards. The mayor is elected at-large.

=== Councillors ===
- Mayor Liz McMillan
- Western Ward: Deputy Mayor Liz McMillan, Rodger Letham
- Eastern Ward: Lynette Lovett, Stuart Wilson
- Ashburton Ward: Leen Braam, Carolyn Cameron, John Falloon, Angus McKay, Diane Rawlinson

=== Community boards ===
- Methven Community Board: Dan McLaughlin, Sonia McAlpine, Kelvin Holmes, Rodger Letham, Liz McMillan, Ron Smith

== History ==
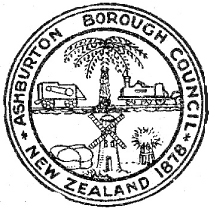
Original Ashburton Borough Council seal (1878–1966)

The council was formed in 1989, replacing the Ashburton County Council established in 1878.

In 2020, the council had 307 staff, including 43 earning more than $100,000. According to the right-wing Taxpayers' Union lobby group, residential rates averaged $2,336.
