= Ashburton Domain =

Park in New Zealand

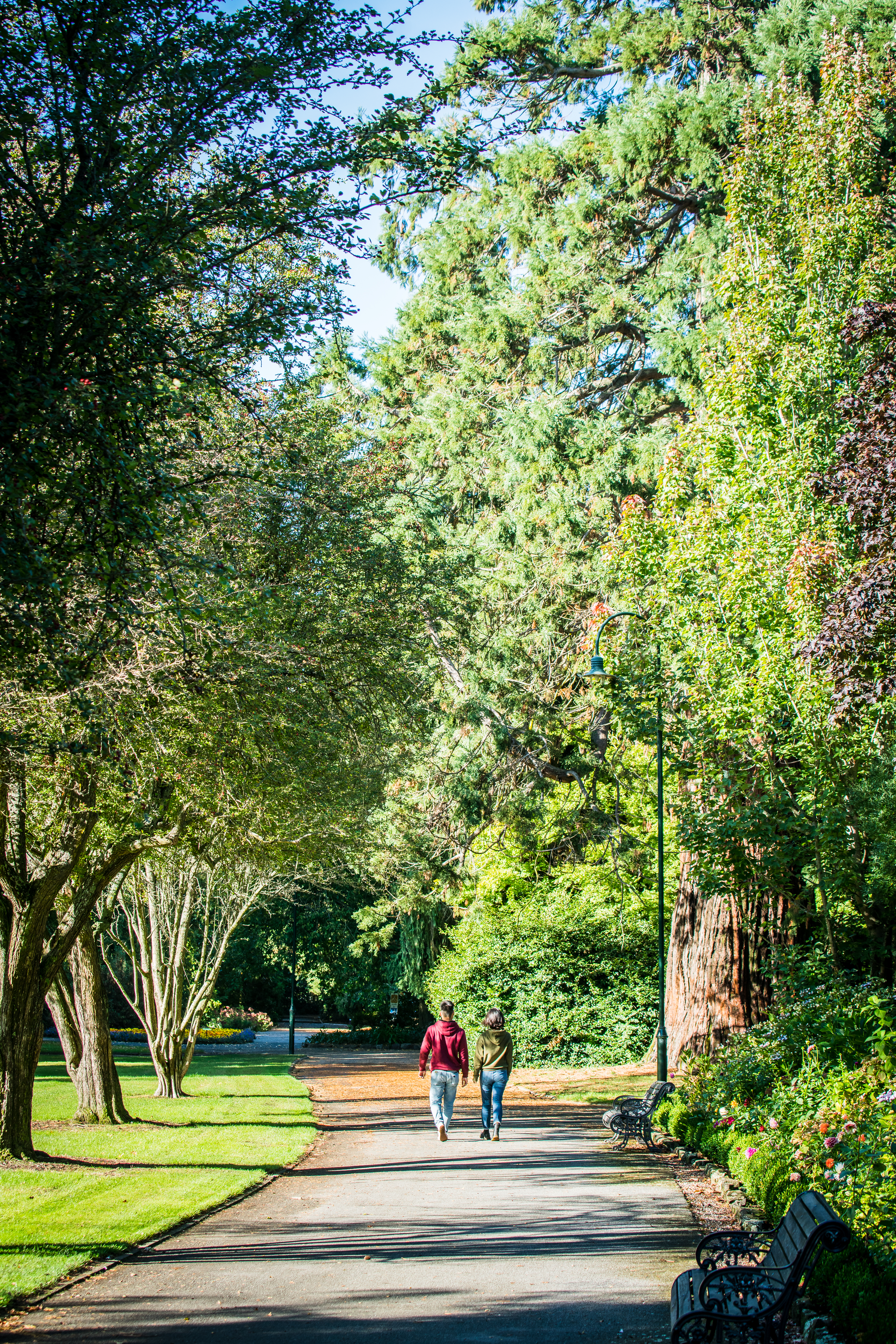
- Interactive map of Ashburton Domain
- Location: Ashburton, New Zealand
- Coordinates: 43°53′51″S 171°45′04″E
- Area: 37 ha (91 acres)
- Operator: Ashburton District Council

Ashburton Domain is a park in the centre of Ashburton, Mid Canterbury, New Zealand. The park was developed from the 1870s and covers 37 hectares (91 acres), including gardens, a lake, a cricket ground and other sporting facilities. Ashburton District Council calls it "the jewel in Ashburton's crown".

== History ==
Ashburton was surveyed by Robert Park in 1864. The town is laid out around two central squares either side of the railway line and main highway, Baring Square East and Baring Square West. The Ashburton Domain was included in the plans for the purposes of gardens and recreation. The 40 ha (100 acres) of land that was identified for the domain was described at the time a "miserable wildness" of spear grass, broom, and tussock.

=== Establishment ===
A Domain Board was established in 1874. However, the land allocated for the domain was not developed until 1877, when the Domain Board appointed a gardener to begin work on systematic planting, with funding that had been provided by the Canterbury Provincial Council, shortly before it was dis-established in 1876. In 1878, the Ashburton Road Board made a grant of £250 to the domain, and the cricket club obtained a further £100 from the Ashburton County Council, enabling the layout and sowing of a cricket field in the southeast of the domain. In 1880, water was diverted from the nearby Mill Creek into an old river channel and in 1886 two dams were built, forming lakes including a horseshoe bend and an island.

The County Council built a hospital for Ashburton in a corner of the domain reserve from 1879. It was a brick building with white stone facings, larger, more costly and of better appearance than most other buildings in the town at the time.

In 1889, responsibility for the control of the domain was transferred to the Ashburton Borough Council to enable more security of funding. From 1889, a small lake in the domain was converted to a swimming pool, in response to the increasing popularity of swimming. In 1892, a swimming carnival at the domain attracted 59 entrants and 2,000 spectators. By 1895, the domain was being used by organisations for holding picnics. During the particularly cold winters of 1886, 1889 and 1895, ice skating carnivals were held in the swimming pool area. The swimming pool was used during summer seasons until 1948 when the pool was permanently closed because of public health concerns.

=== 1894–1904 ===
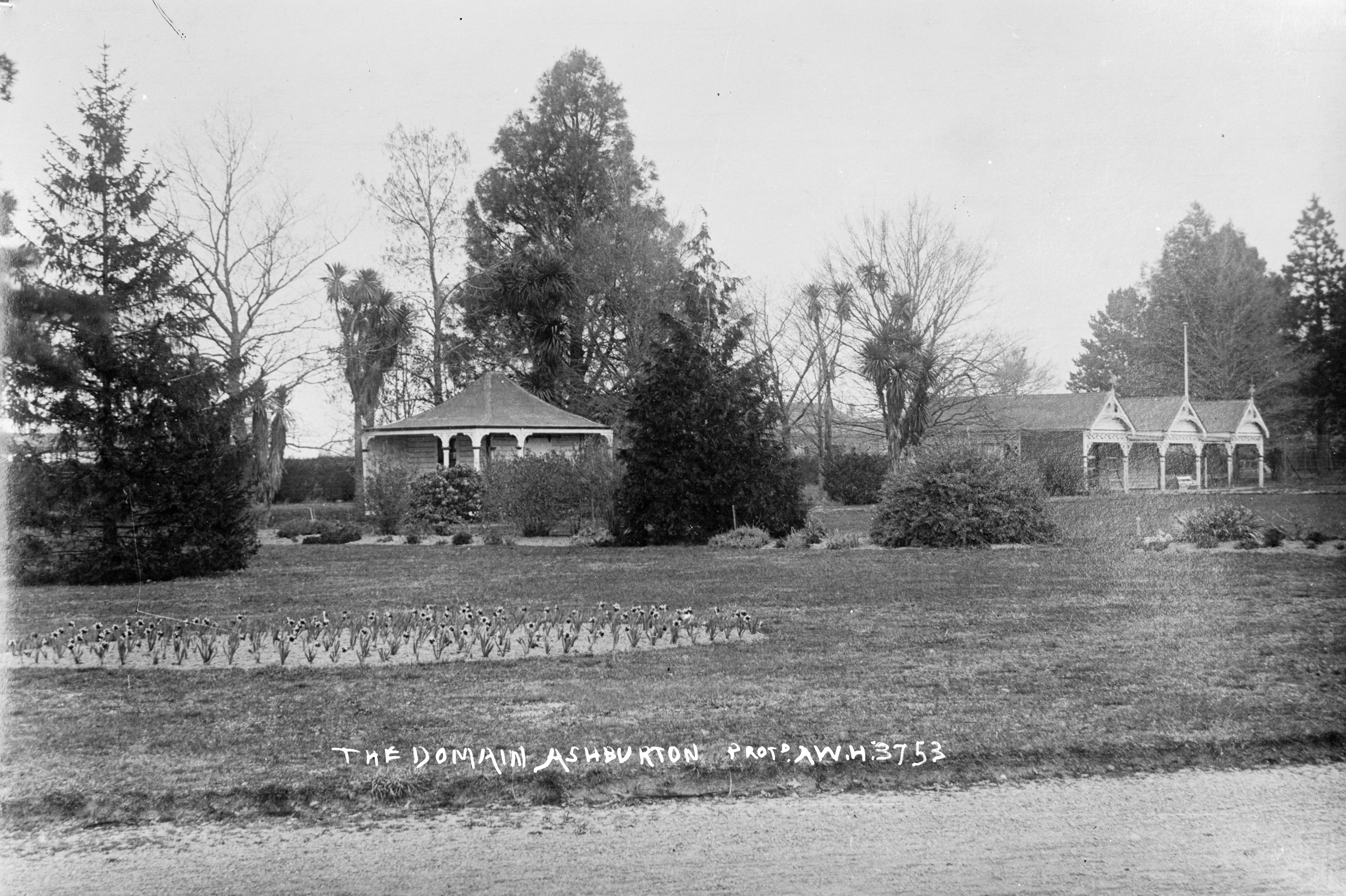
Ashburton Domain c. 1910–1920, taken by Alfred W Hopkins

In June 1894, the Domain Board appointed W.W. Smith as the new caretaker for the domain, after a period of over 20 years of piecemeal development of the grounds. Smith was highly experienced, having spent many years as a landscape gardener at large estates including Burghley House in England, and after moving to New Zealand, the Mt Peel Station in Canterbury owned by John Acland, and Windsor Park in Oamaru. By 1895, the Domain Board had upgraded Smith's title to "curator" and increased his salary from £78 to £100.

As curator, Smith was required to manage a diverse range of development and maintenance activities. In addition to parkland and gardens, the Ashburton Domain in the 1890s included a cricket pitch, tennis courts and a hockey field. Some of the land was leased out for grazing. Smith established the rose garden in 1895, and a bowling green was created in 1898. His designs for the gardens areas featured curved pathways and naturalistic plantings with increasing use of native trees and shrubs. He arranged planting of many trees in the 1890s although there was damage caused to some trees by drought in the period 1896–99 and losses of wattle and eucalyptus trees as a result of exceptionally heavy frosts in 1898. The rows of conifers planted in 1898 in the vicinity of the croquet ground remain one of the notable features of the domain.

Smith's work included thinning out existing trees, improving paths and developing the flower beds. He created rose beds next to the lodge, and labelled trees with their botanical names. Development of the domain was slow as Smith was reliant on seeds and shrubs donated by the public. In 1903, Smith started to replant an island in the middle of the lake, using native trees and shrubs. By 1903, editorials in the Ashburton Guardian commented on the beauty of the domain, and urged that further work should focus on adding New Zealand native trees and other native flora. When Smith resigned from the curator role in 1904 to take up a position with the Scenery Preservation Commission, an editorial in the Ashburton Guardian praised his work in the landscaping of the domain, stating that "its present beauty is due to his careful solicitude and diligent application".

=== 1930s to present ===
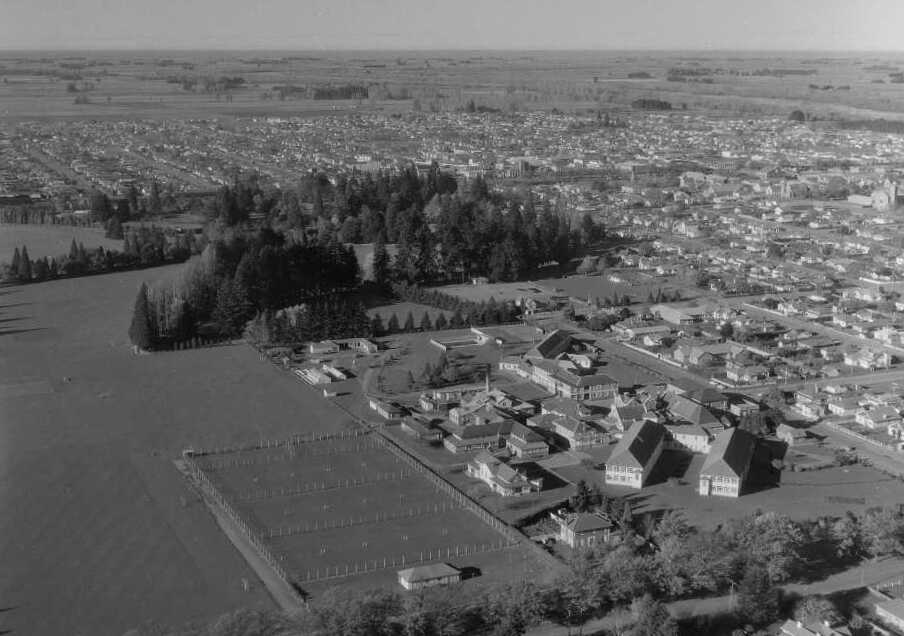
Ashburton Domain and Ashburton Hospital in 1962

On 19 January 1935, Ashburton hosted a reception for Prince Henry, Duke of Gloucester at the domain oval. The Duke addressed a large crowd at the ceremony using a public address system. This was the first time that a public address system had been used in Ashburton.

By the 1930s, there were increasing public criticism of the Ashburton Domain when compared with parks in other towns. The Council responded in 1938 by appointing a new curator, Dennis H Leigh. He was a well-trained horticulturalist, with prior experience at Kew Gardens. He served as curator until 1946 and restored colour and variety to the plantings in the domain. Leigh planted 68,000 daffodil bulbs in the domain in 1939, and these along with the flowering cherry trees, became a popular attraction in springtime.

During World War II, the domain was used as a temporary camp for soldiers prior to deployment to the Pacific, with 800 men from the 2nd Canterbury Regiment in tents in the domain in March 1941. One of the largest events to take place in the Ashburton Domain was the welcome for Queen Elizabeth II and the Duke of Edinburgh on 22 January 1954.

In February 1998, a crowd of over 5,000 attended a concert given by Malvina Major and the Christchurch Symphony Orchestra in the domain oval, in very hot conditions.

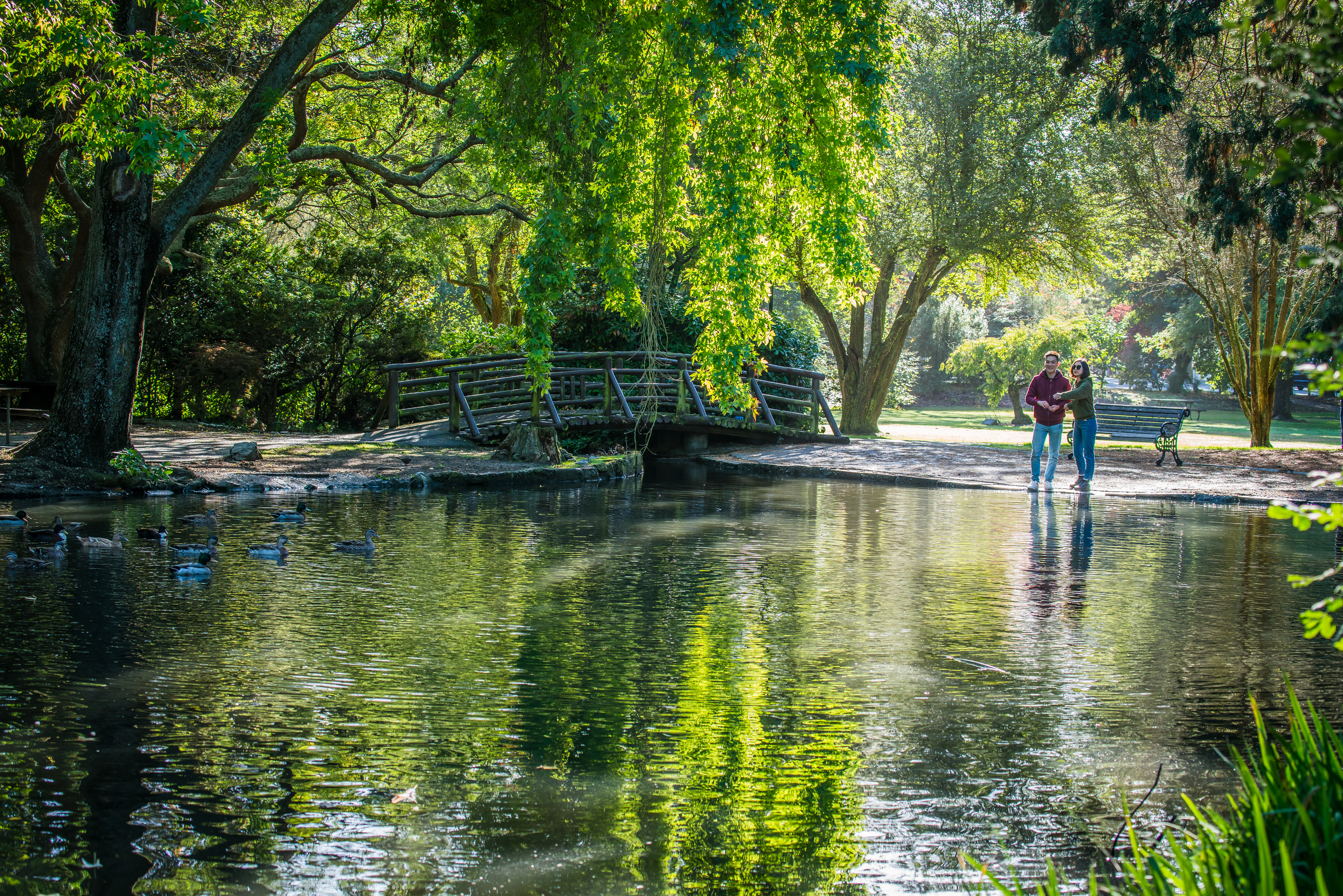
Lake in Ashburton Domain in 2016

The 2000, the existing grass tennis courts were replaced with new 16 courts on a competition-grade surface. The centre was described as "one of the best in New Zealand". In 2020, a long term plan for redevelopment of the domain proposed that the Ashburton Bowling Club should be relocated, to allow for the construction of an information hub. The Bowling Club had been at its current site in the domain for 125 years, and stated that they could not afford to relocate. An aviary that was originally built in 1965 was demolished in 2022 to allow space for a play area and educational wildlife garden to be associated with an existing butterfly garden.

Twin flying foxes were opened in December 2023, as a replacement for an older flying fox that was removed in 2020. As of 2025, the sporting codes using the domain include athletics, bowls, cricket, croquet, hockey, football, hockey and tennis.

== Cricket ground ==
Cricket has been played on the ground since the late 1870s. The first major match on the ground came when Ashburton County played the touring Tasmanian team in 1884. In 1913, after touring New Zealand with the South Melbourne Cricket Club, the Australian Test cricketer Harry Trott said the pitch at Ashburton Domain was the best he had seen in New Zealand.

The ground held its first senior interprovincial match when Canterbury played Otago in the 1980/81 Shell Cup. Three further List A matches have been held on the ground, the last of which saw Canterbury play Central Districts in the 1988/89 Shell Cup. It is the home ground for the Mid Canterbury cricket team, which competes nationally in the Hawke Cup.
