= Ashburton Clock Tower =

Clock tower in Ashburton, New Zealand

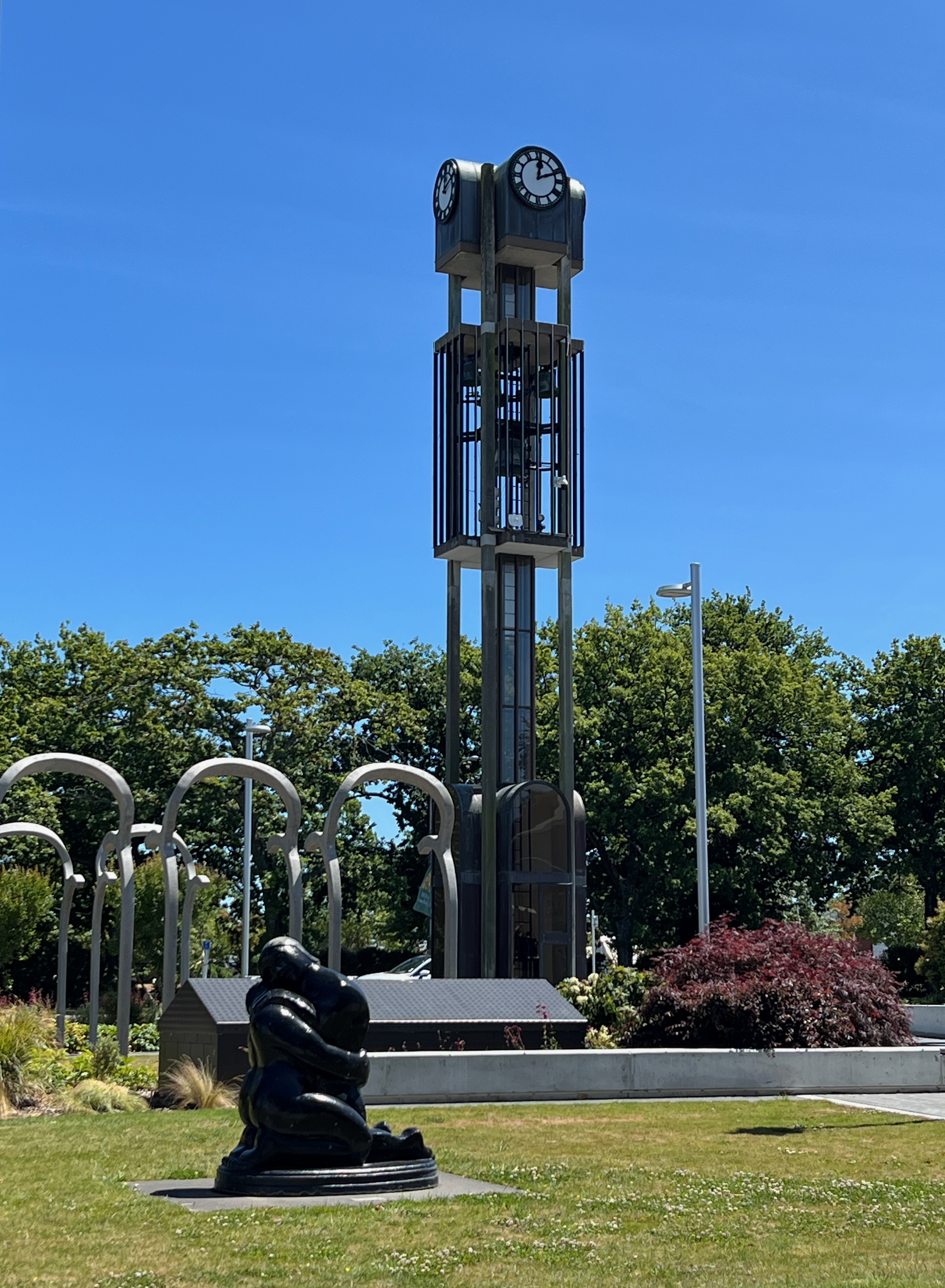
- The Clock Tower
- Interactive map of the Ashburton Clock Tower area

General information
- Type: Clock Tower
- Location: Ashburton, New Zealand, 388/336 East Street
- Coordinates: 43°54′12.6″S 171°44′58″E
- Inaugurated: 26 November 1976; 49 years ago

Height
- Height: 21 m (69 ft)

Design and construction
- Architecture firm: Warren and Mahoney
- Main contractor: Bradford Construction

The Ashburton Clock Tower is a well-known landmark in the centre of Ashburton, a town in the South Island of New Zealand. The clock tower was built in 1976. The clock installed in the tower was originally purchased in 1902 for installation in a clock tower in the Ashburton Post Office. It was a feature of the town until the clock tower on the Post Office building was demolished in 1946 because of earthquake strength concerns. The clock and bells remained in storage until they were refurbished and re-installed in a new clock tower built in 1976 to commemorate the centenary of the formation of the Ashburton County.

== History ==
=== Post Office clock tower (1903) ===
After a fire damaged a previous Post Office building in 1900, plans were prepared for a new Ashburton Post Office. The design made provision for a clock tower with bells, but the Postmaster-General, Joseph Ward, required that the Ashburton Borough Council assume responsibility for the maintenance of the new town clock. The foundation stone for the new post office was laid in January 1901. The Council offered to transfer the existing Jubilee Clock from the Ashburton Library, but were advised that it was not suitable for the new clock tower. A fundraising campaign for a new town clock began in 1901, and in 1902, Cabinet agreed to the installation of a clock provided that the community met half the cost, with a required contribution of £375.

The new Post Office opened in 1903, but the clock tower remained empty until the new clock was installed in early 1904.

=== The clock (1904) ===
The clock was ordered from Littlejohn & Son of Wellington in 1902. It was first installed in the Post Office clock tower and commissioned on 4 February 1904. The final cost was £820. The four bells of the clock produce the Westminster Chimes. The bells have a combined weight of almost 2 tonnes.

=== Demolition of the tower (1946) ===
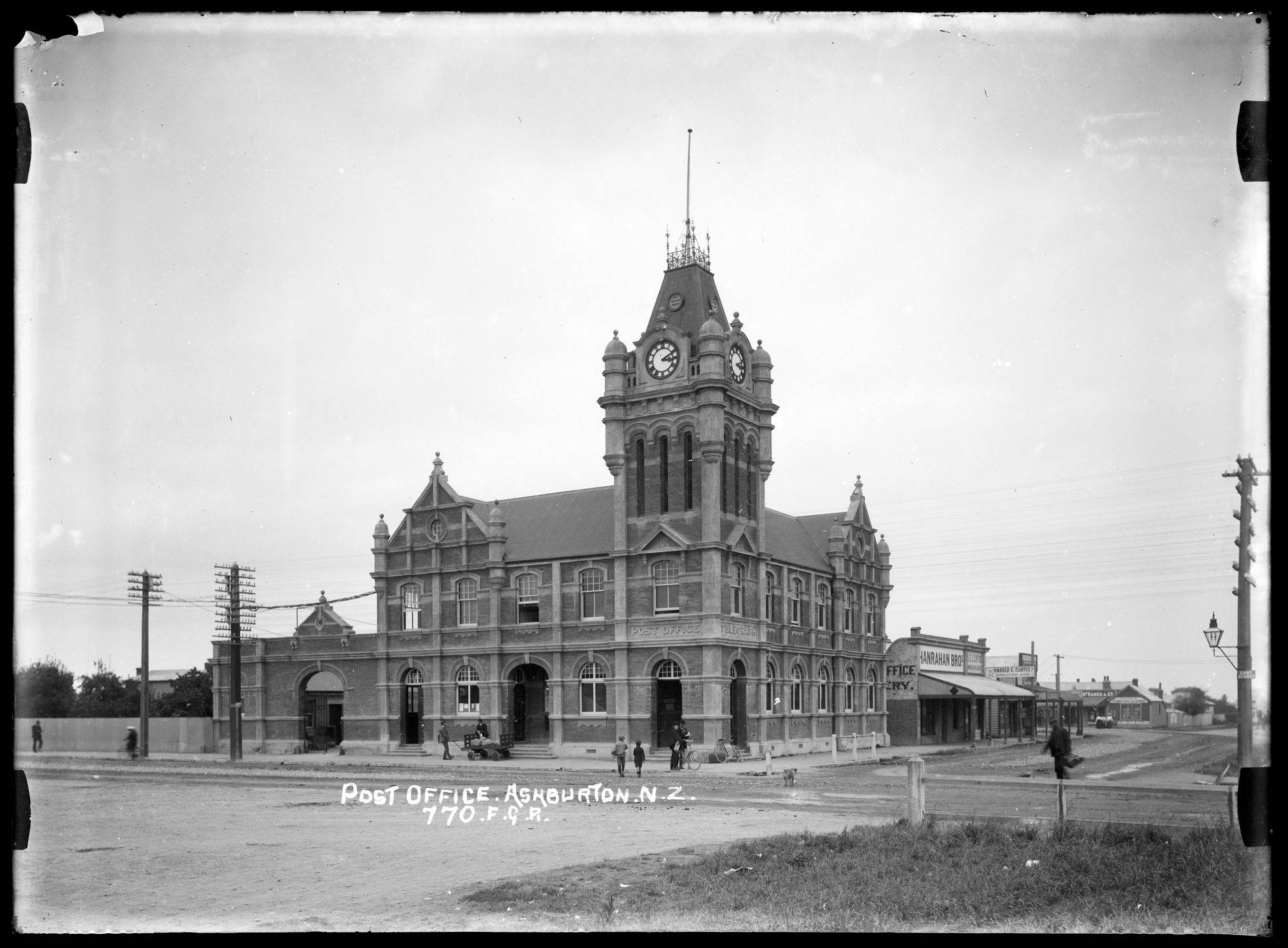
Ashburton Post Office ca 1909

In early 1944, the Post & Telegraph Department issued a notice advising that clock towers were to be removed from many Post Office buildings, including Ashburton. The reason was because investigation of damage to buildings in recent earthquakes had shown that the towers had increased the level of damage. The statement noted that in almost all cases, the clocks and bells had been funded by communities, and would be handed back prior to demolition of the towers.

In many towns in New Zealand, clock towers were a feature of the urban landscape, and a valued symbol of the community. There was strong opposition to the removal of the Ashburton Post Office clock tower, including a petition to Parliament presented in June 1945.

In February 1946, the clock was dismantled and removed for storage, pending the demolition of the clock tower. There was a strong sense of loss in the community.

=== Proposed war memorial clock tower ===
In 1952, a design competition was held for a war memorial clock tower to be established in Baring Square. However, by June 1954, insufficient funds had been raised for the project and it was abandoned.

=== Refurbishment of the clock ===
In the 1970s, in anticipation that a new clock tower would finally be built, a group of volunteers from the Ashburton Lions Club worked on restoration of the clock mechanism, with 400 hours of labour in a home workshop in sessions every Monday night for a year.

== Clock tower (1976) ==
The Ashburton County Council decided to fund the establishment of a new clock tower in Baring Square East as part of celebrating the centenary of the Ashburton County in 1977. (Note: The Ashburton County Council (established 1877), and the Ashburton Bororough Council (established 1878), were superseded by the Ashburton District Council in 1989.)

The clock tower is 21 m (69 ft) high. It was designed by Warren and Mahoney Architects, and built in 1976 by Bradford Construction Ltd. The refurbished 1904 clock mechanism was installed by Horrell Engineering. The clock and its bell chimes were re-commissioned in the new tower at 4:00pm on 26 November 1976.

A seismic upgrade of the tower was completed in 2011, using wraps of glass fibre fabric around the top and bottom 600 mm (24 in) of the four post-tensioned concrete columns. The belfry slab was also strengthened.

A local Ashburton engineer, Trevor Cullimore, took on the role of caretaker of the clock from the time of its re-commissioning in 1976. As of 2024, he had been maintaining the clock for 48 years.

== Awards ==
The clock tower has won awards including for “Enduring Architecture” in 2004 from the New Zealand Institute of Architects.
