= William Smith (conservationist) =

New Zealand gardener, naturalist and conservationist

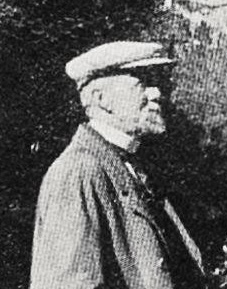
- Smith in 1933
- Born: William Walter Smith; 14 September 1852; Hawick, Scotland
- Died: 3 March 1942 (aged 89); New Plymouth, New Zealand
- Occupations: Gardener; conservationist
- Known for: Conservation of New Zealand species
- Notable work: Ashburton Domain; Pukekura Park

William Walter Smith (14 September 1852 – 3 March 1942) was a New Zealand gardener, naturalist and conservationist. He was born in Hawick, Roxburghshire, Scotland, in 1852, and moved to New Zealand in about 1875. He was part of a five-member commission in charge of implementing the Scenery Preservation Act of 1903, which led to the creation of scenic and historic reserves, and he played a large part in the development of the Ashburton Domain and Pukekura Park. Smith published many items about New Zealand's flora and fauna and fought to preserve native plants and wildlife.

== Early life ==
Smith was born in Hawick, Roxburghshire, Scotland in September 1852 to Thomas Smith, a stocking knitter, and his wife Ellen or Helen Robson, a seamstress. He trained as a gardener on estates in Scotland and in England's Lake District, and would have become familiar with formal gardens and the ideas of landscape designers Loudon and Robinson who created carefully crafted park lands and gardens known as 'romantic' or 'natural' gardens. From 1871, Smith worked for over three years at Burghley Estate in England. This was notable as a garden designed by Capability Brown during the eighteenth century; in his daily work Smith would have been exposed to the realisation of Brown's vision from a century before. The head gardener at Burghley stated that Smith was "skilled in practical geometry and in the laying out of grounds and in every sense of the word a very intelligent young man".

== Work in New Zealand ==
Smith emigrated to New Zealand around 1875 and spent four and half years as gardener at Mount Peel Station in Canterbury, leaving there in 1880 to get married. He later worked at various places in Canterbury and Otago, including Oamaru and fourteen months at Lake Brunner. During his time at the Albury Estate, a large land holding near Timaru, Smith said he had sighted the rare laughing owl (Sceloglaux albifacies). Smith was interested in entomology, and had a large collection of butterflies and moths at his home in Ashburton in the 1880s.

=== Ashburton Domain 1894–1904 ===
In June 1894, Smith was appointed as caretaker of the Ashburton Domain, a position that came with a lodge for his family. The 90 acre (36 ha) domain was controlled by the Ashburton Borough Council. The domain was bordered on one side by an old river channel which had been turned into an artificial lake. Smith's work included thinning out existing trees, improving paths and developing the flower beds. He created rose beds next to the lodge, and labelled trees with their botanical names. Development of the domain was slow as Smith was reliant on seeds and shrubs donated by the public. In 1903, Smith started to replant an island in the middle of the lake, using native trees and shrubs.

Aside from his job as caretaker, Smith took part in local affairs. He was a judge for the local horticultural society, helped the A & P Association to identify pests, and was on the committee of the local beautification society. From the 1890s, Smith wrote about many natural history topics and his belief that native flora and fauna should be valued and protected.

=== Scenery Preservation Commission 1904–1906 ===
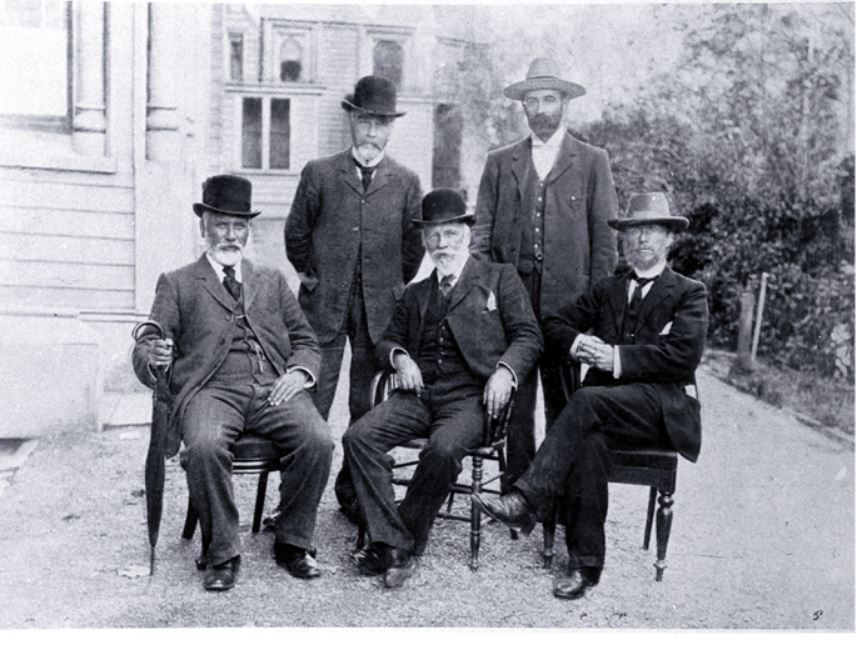
Members of the Scenery Preservation Commission, 1904. W. W. Smith at front right.

The Scenery Preservation Act was passed in 1903, and in 1904 Smith was appointed as secretary of the Scenery Preservation Commission implementing the Act. He initially declined the position, not wanting to give up his permanent job at the Ashburton Domain for a temporary appointment, but Premier Richard Seddon met Smith and persuaded him to accept the role. Smith was assured that a permanent position would be found for him once the commission had completed its work, but this did not eventuate.

The five-person commission travelled around New Zealand inspecting scenic and historic sites to find areas that should be preserved. They looked at forest remnants that were rapidly being destroyed as farming and forestry developed, other landscape features such as waterfalls, rivers and lakes, and Māori pā sites and significant locations. As part of his work on the commission, Smith spoke out against deforestation and 'burning off' of ancient forests. By 1906, 381 sites had been recommended and 61 areas had been gazetted as scenic reserves under the Act, but the commission's recommendations and expenses were being criticised. Premier Seddon had not realised the scale of the work or the thoroughness of the commission's investigations. The commission was cancelled and replaced with a Scenery Preservation Board with a different operating structure, and Smith lost his job.

=== Palmerston North 1907–1908 ===
Smith moved to the North Island around 1907. In early 1907, the government put forward a proposal to use Kapiti Island as a leper colony. Local residents opposed this, and Smith joined a committee to fight the government's plan. In published articles and letters, he said that Kapiti should be preserved for native birdlife, and suggested that it might make a good refuge for the huia, which was then on the point of extinction. Smith is thought to have been the last "competent naturalist" to have sighted a huia. He saw three of them at Mount Holdsworth in the Tararua Range in 1907.

In November 1907, Smith was contracted as curator by the Palmerston North Borough Council to maintain its reserves, which included The Square, the Esplanade and the river banks. Before Smith arrived to begin work in early December 1907, a highly critical opinion of him was published in an anonymous letter to the editor of the Manawatu Standard. Smith was greatly offended, and wrote back defending his work in Ashburton and his interests in entomology. Trouble continued, and in February 1908 Smith resigned his position. He had a lot of support from councillors and others, but the mayor of Palmerston North was against him, calling Smith a "common cabbage gardener".

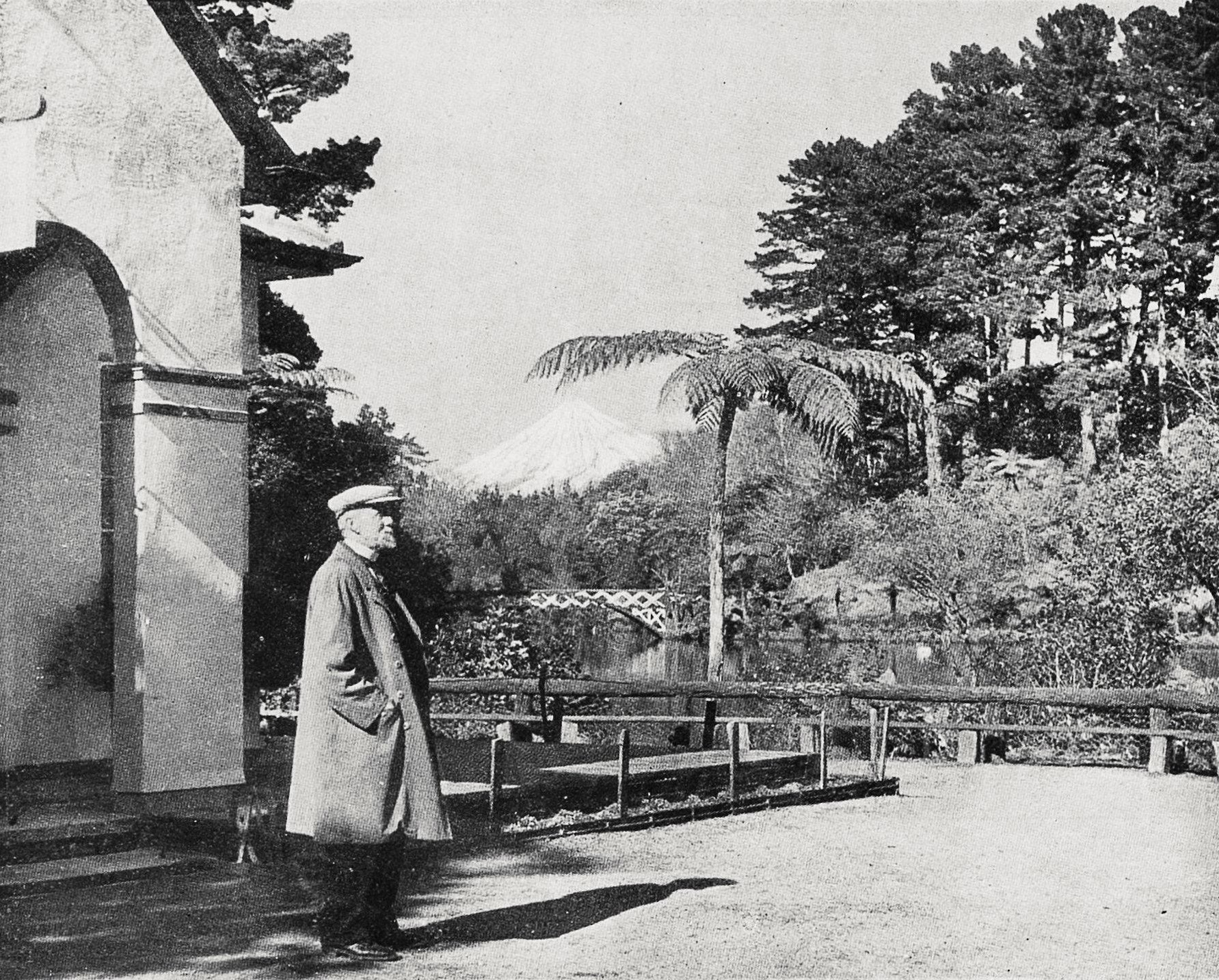
Pukekura Park in 1933: "The park is regarded as one of New Zealand's most picturesque domains. On the left is Mr. W. W. Smith, a well-known Dominion authority on natural history and a former curator of Pukekura Park."

=== Pukekura Park, New Plymouth 1908–1920 ===
In March 1908, Smith became curator at Pukekura Park in New Plymouth. He gained this position with the support of Percy Smith, who had been chairman of the Scenery Preservation Commission that Smith worked on a few years earlier. The park was a 46 acre (19 ha) hilly site with an artificial lake and a sports ground. Smith developed the park by planting near the band rotunda and planting native trees and ferns throughout the park. He planted kauri on a path near the lake, and removed some Pinus radiata which had been planted in the 1870s, replacing them with totara and rimu. Smith bred kiwi at the park during his eleven years there, the first kiwi to be bred in captivity in New Zealand.

Smith spent so much time writing and advising on natural history subjects that the park board began to object, so Smith resigned his position at the park in October 1920. Smith is commemorated by a plaque on a boulder at the start of Smith Walk, a path in the park named after him.

== Later life ==
Smith could not find another job after resigning from Pukekura Park at the age of 68. He continued to live in New Plymouth, keeping up his correspondence and articles about natural history topics. Smith had supported the New Zealand Native Bird Protection Society since its foundation in 1923 but could no longer afford membership of this or other scientific societies, so in 1931 the Native Bird Protection Society made him an honorary life member.

In 1935, Smith was one of 1500 New Zealanders awarded a King's Silver Jubilee Medal. Smith died in New Plymouth on 3 March 1942.

== Legacy ==
Smith's gardens at Ashburton and New Plymouth were very well regarded. He began with familiar British trees but soon incorporated New Zealand trees and plants into his work. He was also highly respected for his studies of plants, birds and invertebrates. Smith was aware of the rapidly changing landscape in New Zealand and wrote about the processes endangering wildlife. He could see that deforestation was affecting the climate, and knew that "as many of our plants and insects are wholly dependent on each other, any cause affecting one affects the other". He blamed the loss of the laughing owl at Albury on ferrets introduced by farmers.

Smith came from a working-class background and had no scientific education or training, but by careful observation, consulting scientific literature, corresponding with experts and talking to Māori who had intimate knowledge of wildlife in their area, Smith built up a body of knowledge that was valuable to scientists. During his lifetime, politician and scientist George Thomson said that Smith was “second to none in the Dominion as a field naturalist". Many of Smith's published articles and letters were cited by scientists long after his death, and several species were named after him.
