= Ashburton, New Zealand =

Town in Canterbury, New Zealand

Ashburton Hakatere (Māori)
- Secondary urban area
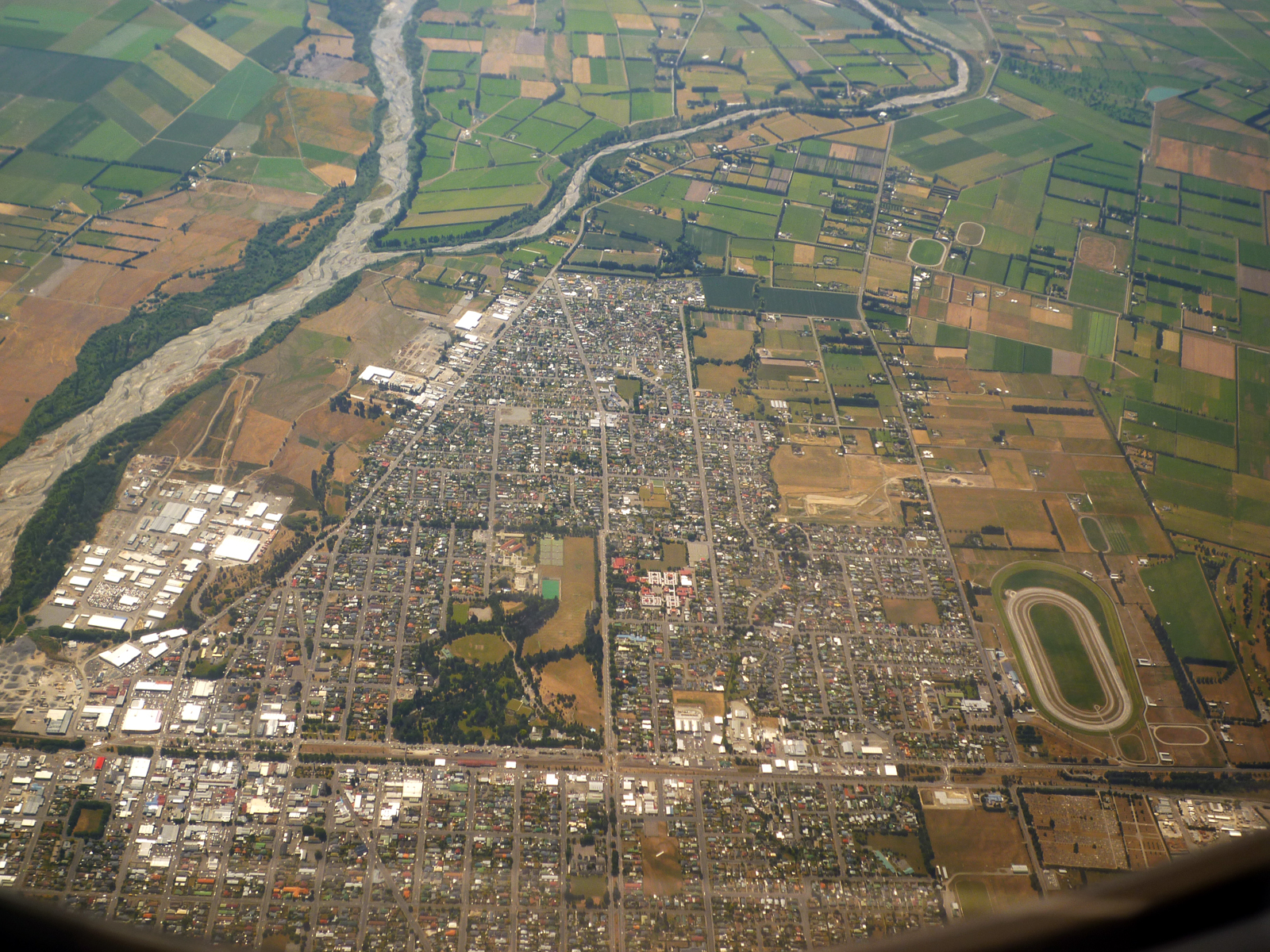
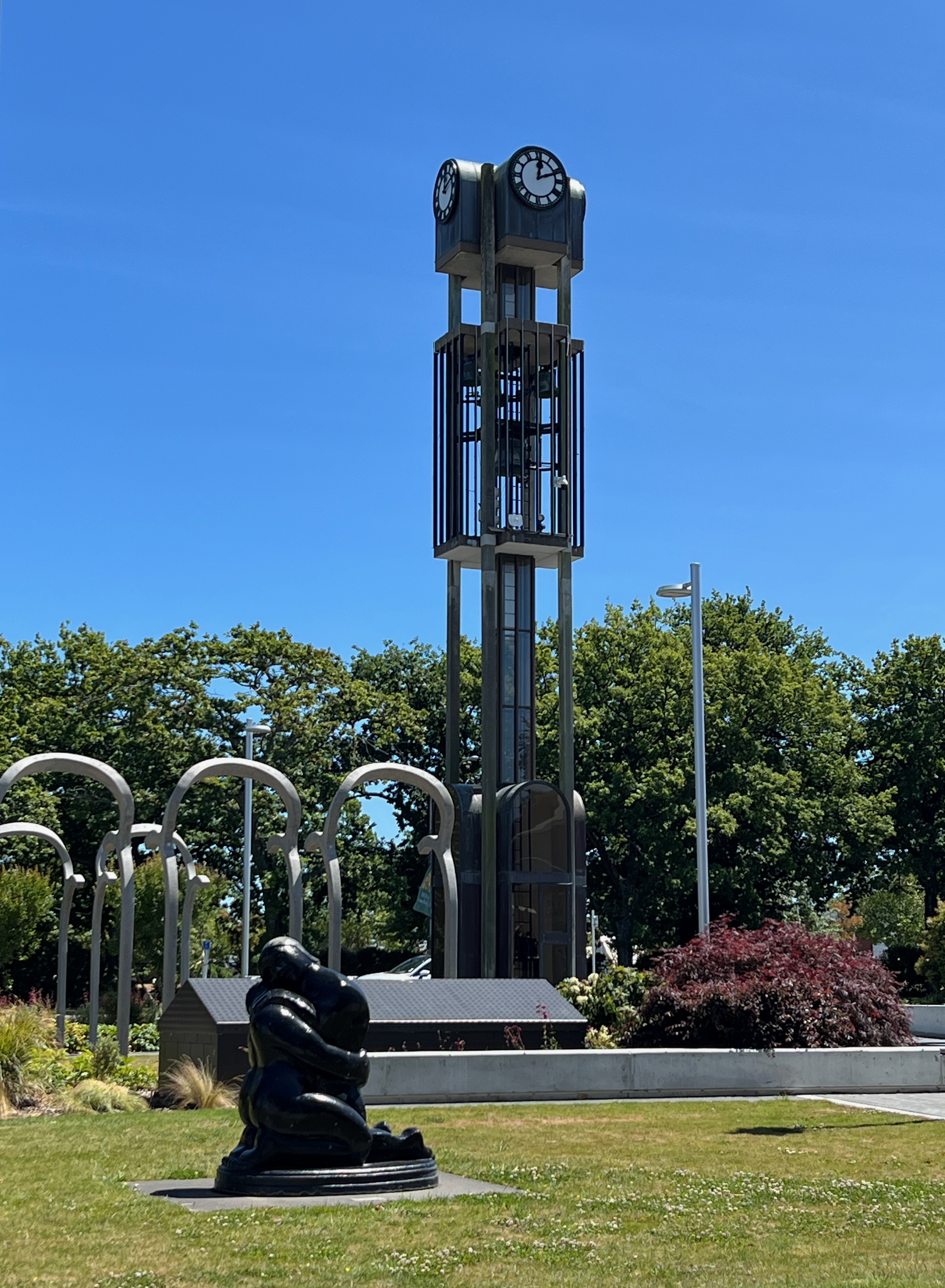
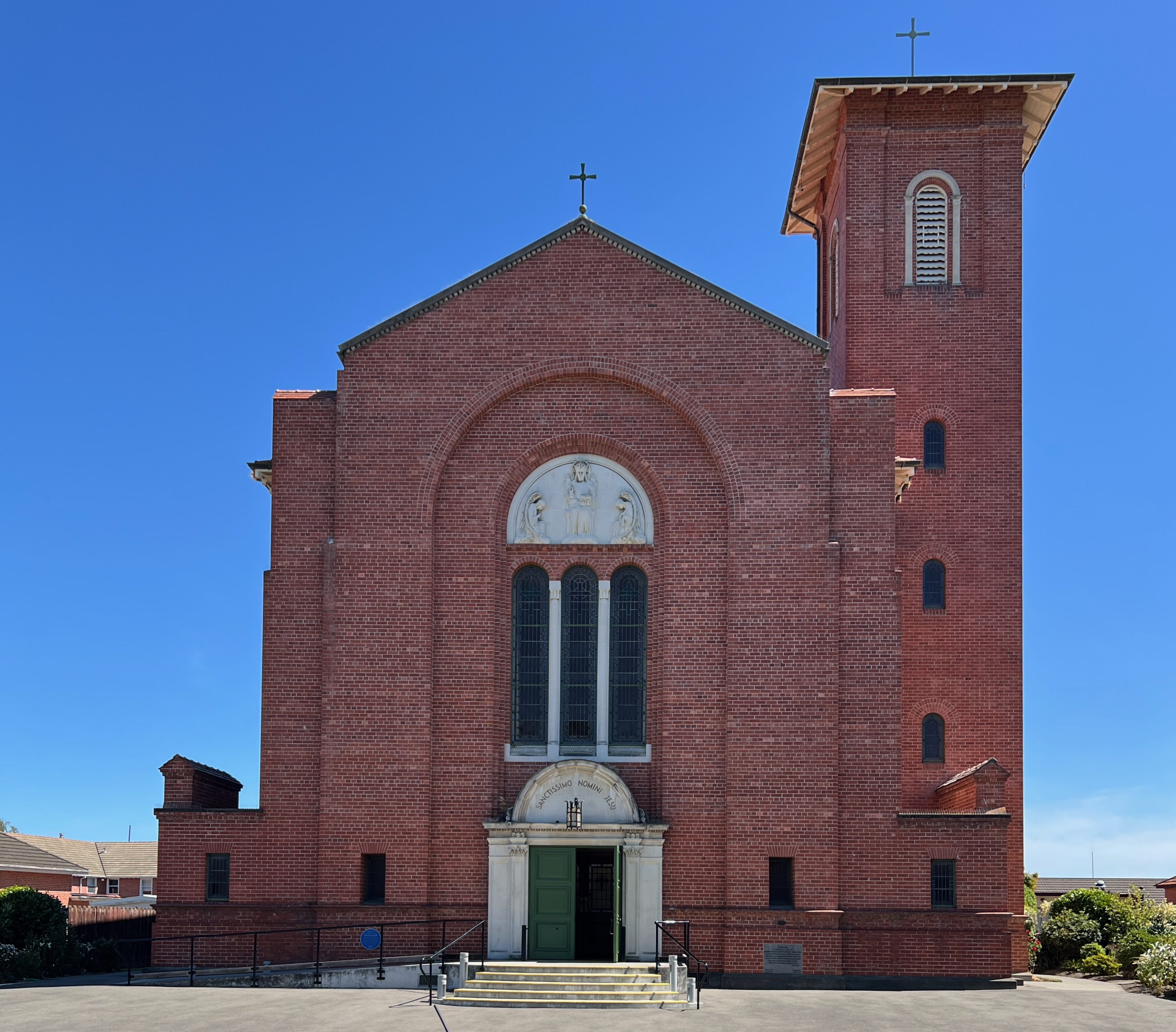
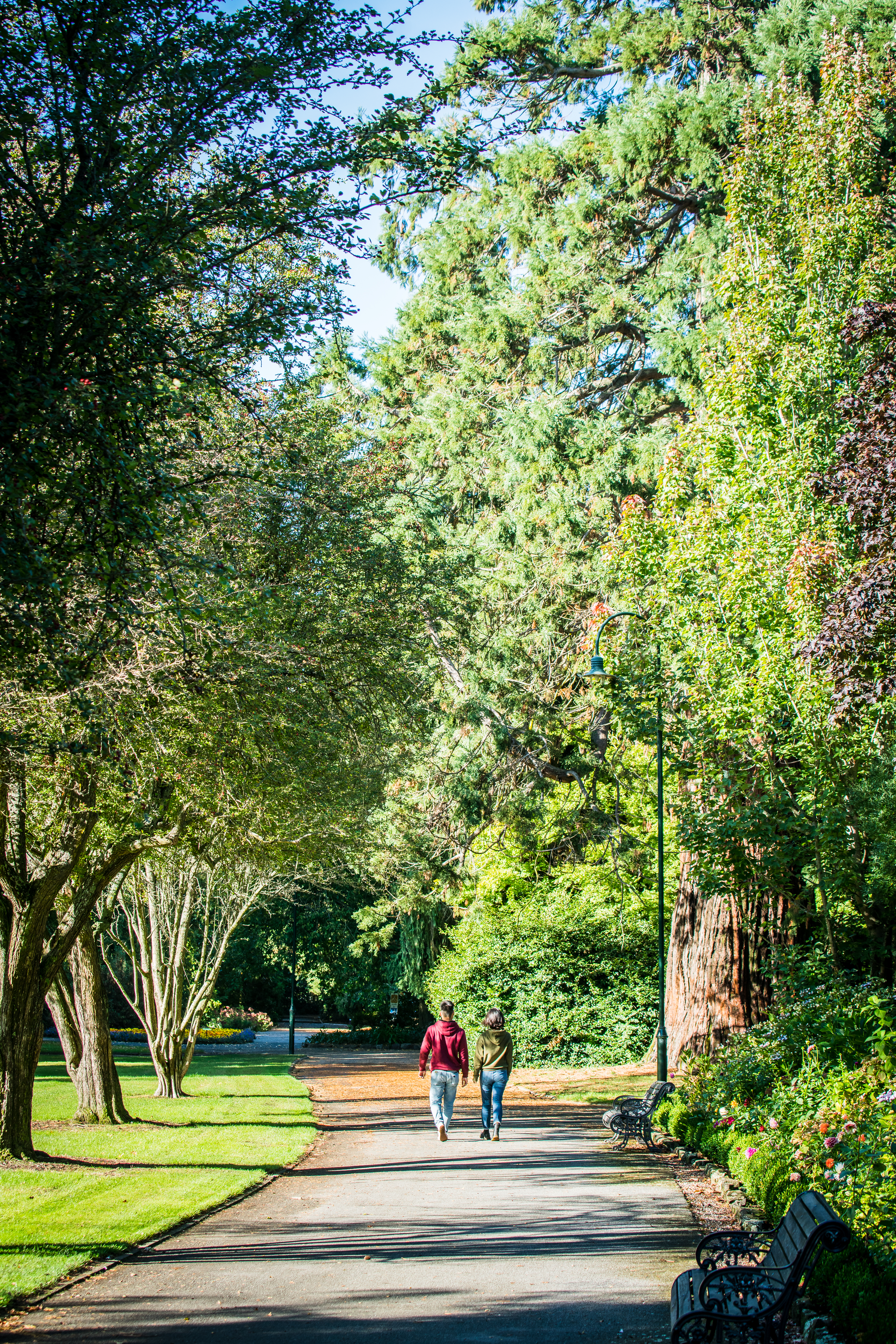
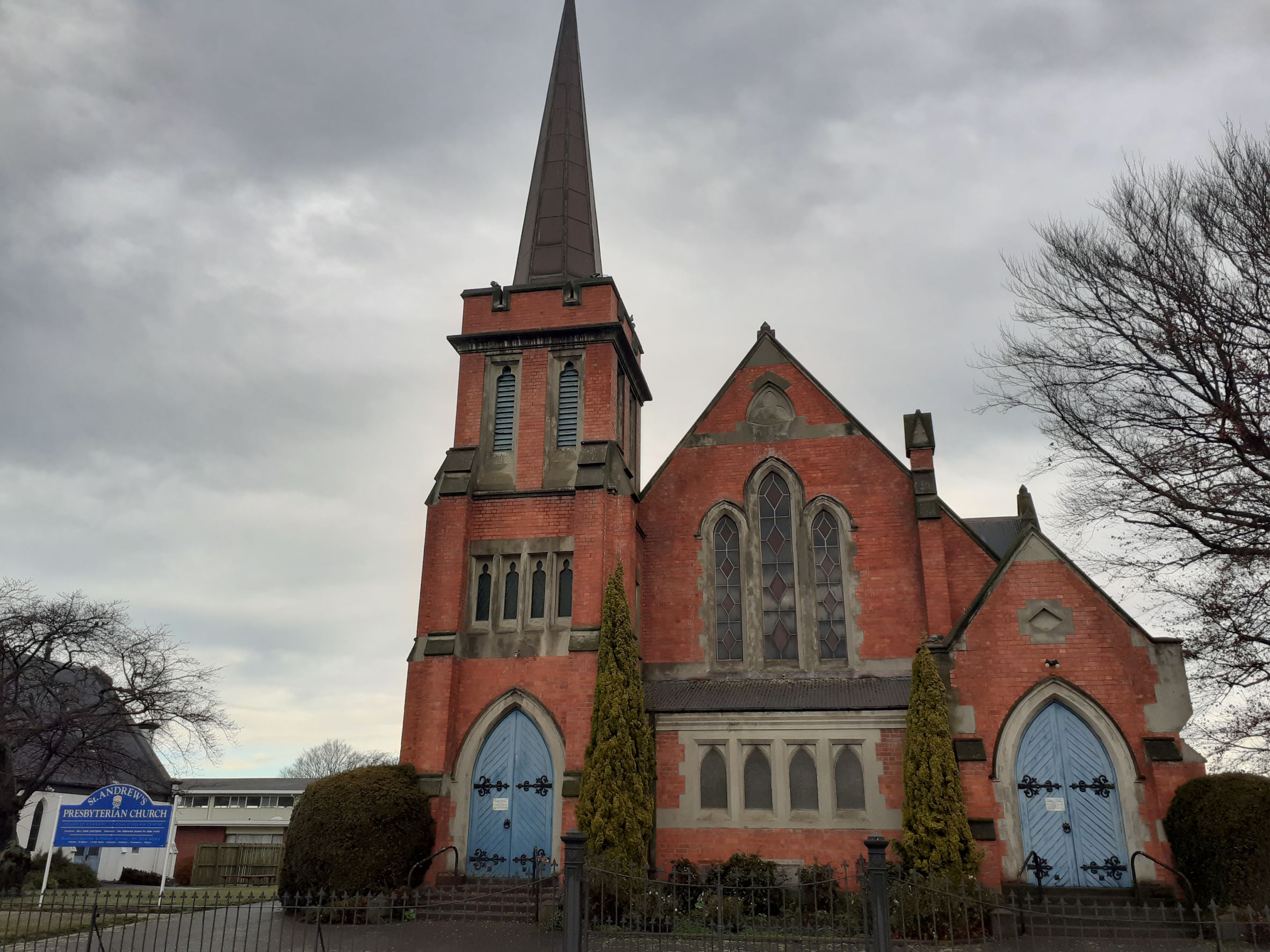
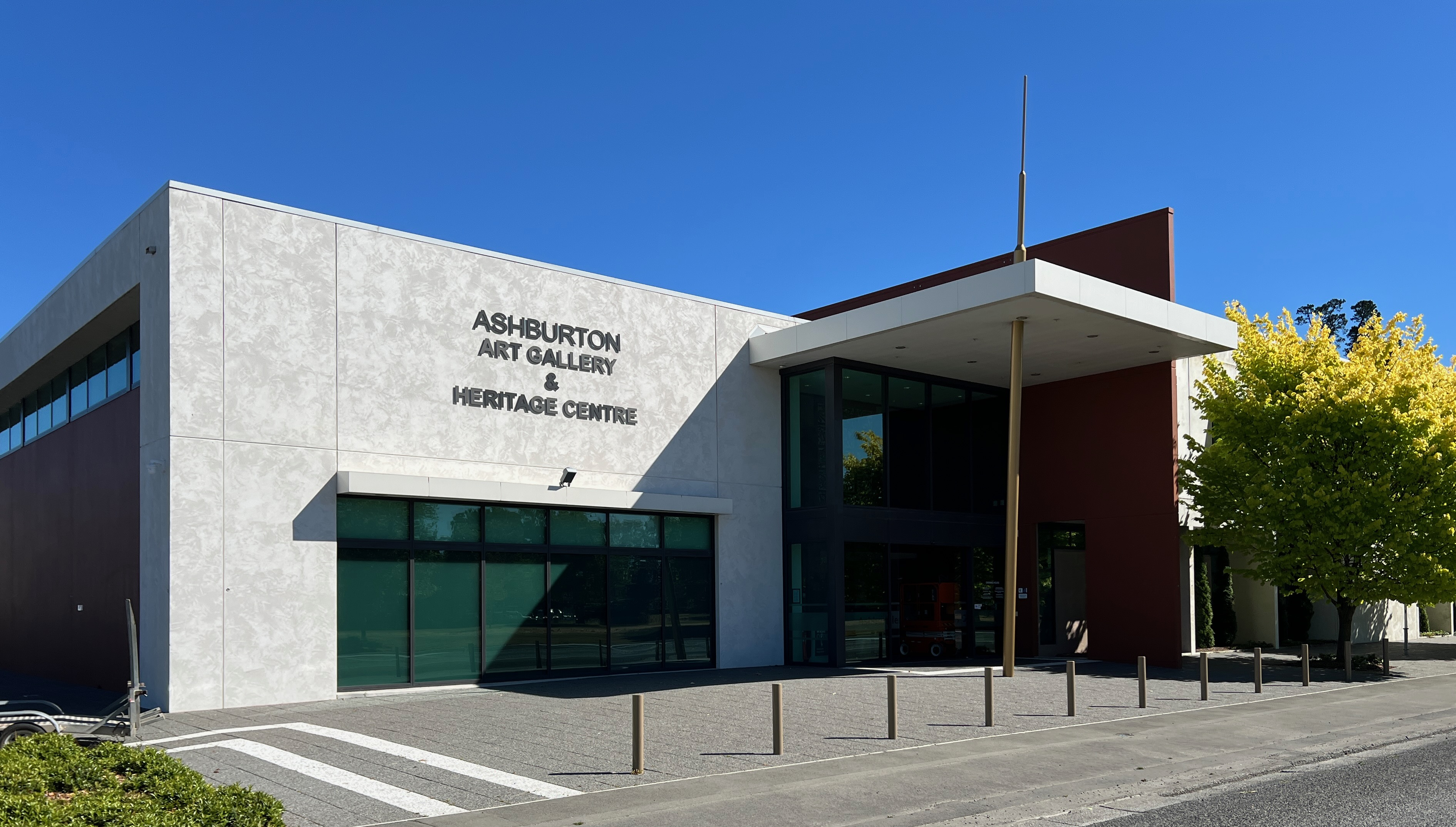
- Aerial view of Ashburton, looking west. Ashburton Clock Tower Church of the Holy Name Ashburton Domain St Andrew's Presbyterian Church Ashburton Art Gallery and Heritage Centre
- Nickname: Ashvegas
- Interactive map of Ashburton
- Coordinates: 43°54′20″S 171°44′44″E
- Country: New Zealand
- Region: Canterbury
- District: Ashburton District Council
- Ward: Ashburton
- Electorates: Rangitata; Te Tai Tonga (Māori)

Government
  - Territorial authority: Ashburton District Council
  - Regional council: Environment Canterbury
  - Mayor of Ashburton: Liz McMillan
  - Rangitata MP: James Meager
  - Te Tai Tonga MP: Mananui Ramsden

Area
  - Territorial: 39.99 km^{2} (15.44 sq mi)

Population (June 2025)
  - Territorial: 21,600
  - Density: 540/km^{2} (1,400/sq mi)
- Demonym: Ashburtonian
- Time zone: UTC+12 (NZST)
  - Summer (DST): UTC+13 (NZDT)
- Postcode(s): Map of postcodes
- Postcode(s): 7700
- Area code: 03
- Local iwi: Ngāi Tahu
- Website: Ashburton District Council

Ashburton (Māori: Hakatere) is a large town in the Canterbury Region, on the east coast of the South Island of New Zealand. It is the seat of the Ashburton District Council. It is 85 kilometres (53 mi) south west of Christchurch.

The town has a population of 21,600. It is the 29th-largest urban area in New Zealand and the fourth-largest urban area in the Canterbury Region, after Christchurch, Timaru and Rolleston.

== Toponymy ==
Ashburton was named by the surveyor Captain Joseph Thomas of the New Zealand Land Association, after Bingham Baring, 2nd Baron Ashburton, who was a member of the Canterbury Association. Ashburton is sometimes nicknamed "Ashvegas", an ironic allusion to Las Vegas.

Hakatere is the traditional Māori name for the Ashburton River. The name translates as "to make swift or to flow smoothly".

== History ==
Early European explorers travelling through the Ashburton district in the 1840s followed the coastline. However, as land was increasingly taken up for pastoral farming, there was a need for a better route across the Canterbury Plains. A route that crossed the Ashburton River a few miles inland was adopted to avoid swamps along the coast. The township of Ashburton developed as a settlement on the river's north bank and served as an overnight stopping point and staging post for coach travel. In 1858, William Turton operated a ferry service across the Ashburton River, close to the present State Highway 1 Ashburton bridge. He also built an accommodation house which along with some stables were the only buildings in Ashburton in 1863. By 1864 the horse-drawn coaches of the Cobb and Co. business travelled through Ashburton between Christchurch and Timaru. The coach services continued until the Main South Line railway was completed between Christchurch and Timaru in 1876.

The town was surveyed by Robert Park in 1864. It was laid out around two central squares either side of the railway line and main highway, Baring Square East and Baring Square West. The Ashburton Domain was included in the plans for the purposes of gardens and recreation. The 40 ha (100 acres) of land that was identified for the domain was described at the time as a "miserable wildness" of spear grass, broom, and tussock. A cricket pitch was established in the Ashburton Domain in 1878 and the Ashburton Hospital was established adjacent to the domain in 1879. The Canterbury Provincial Government granted 20,000 pounds to develop roads in the district in 1873. The Main South Line railway reached Ashburton in August 1874 and Timaru in 1876. Churches were built in the expanding settlement, including the Presbyterian church in 1876, the Wesleyan church in 1878 and the Catholic church in 1882.

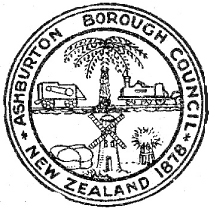
Original Ashburton Borough Council seal (1878–1966)

Ashburton was designated as a borough in 1878. At this stage, there were about 500 buildings within the borough. The Ashburton Borough Council was formed in 1878, and remained the local governing authority for the town until the establishment of the Ashburton District Council in 1989. The Ashburton County Council first met on 4 January 1877 in the Ashburton Road Board office. It became part of Ashburton District Council in 1989, together with Ashburton Borough Council. Netherby was added to the borough of Ashburton in 1917, Hampstead in 1921, and Allenton in 1939. Tinwald was added to the borough In 1955.

During World War II, Ashburton was used as a training base for the Royal New Zealand Air Force with 50 Tiger Moth aircraft based at the Ashburton Aerodrome.

On 1 September 2014, there was a violent incident in Ashburton that received nationwide publicity. A man who had previously been trespassed from the Ashburton Work and Income office arrived at the premises with a shotgun and murdered two front counter workers. At the subsequent trial, the offender was given the third longest sentence on record.

In 2021, the Ashburton slogan: "Whatever it takes" was scrapped by the Ashburton District Council. Having been in use for approximately 10 years, it had drawn criticism. In 2012, it made a list of Top 10 worst NZ city slogans. The Ashburton welcome sign had been changed surreptitiously at times from ‘Ashburton: Whatever it Takes’ to ‘Ashburton: ‘Whatever’.

A new library and civic centre for Ashburton was built between 2021 and 2023, at a final cost of $62.1 million, with a $20 million contribution from the New Zealand government. The three-story building includes council chambers, office space, a recording studio, areas to study in, a library and a performance area. The design also incorporates the historic Pioneer Hall into the facility. The civic centre was named Te Whare Whakatere.

== Geography ==
Ashburton is situated 17 kilometres inland on the Canterbury Plains approximately 86 kilometres (53 mi) south of Christchurch and 75 kilometres north of Timaru. Methven is 33 kilometres inland from Ashburton. Rakaia and the Rakaia river are 28 kilometres to the north of Ashburton.

The town is the centre of an agricultural and pastoral farming district on the Canterbury Plains. It has one large suburb, Tinwald, south of the Ashburton River / Hakatere. The town has three other suburbs: Allenton, Hampstead and Netherby.

=== Climate ===
On the whole, Ashburton shares a similar climate to Christchurch i.e. a dry temperate climate (Cfb). However, since it lies further inland at a higher altitude than Christchurch, Ashburton experiences a greater range of temperatures. Summers in Ashburton can be warm, seeing an average of 39 days exceeding 25 °C (77 °F) and 7 days exceeding 30 °C (86 °F) every year, while winters are frosty, with temperatures dropping below 0 °C (32 °F) an average of 51 nights a year. Ashburton occasionally sees snowfall, with its heaviest being 38 centimetres (15 in) on 12 June 2006, conversely it is tied with Timaru for New Zealand's fourth-highest temperature on record, reaching 41.3 °C (106.3 °F) on 7 February 1973.

Climate data for Ashburton (1991–2020 normals, extremes 1928–present)
Month	Jan	Feb	Mar	Apr	May	Jun	Jul	Aug	Sep	Oct	Nov	Dec	Year
Record high °C (°F)	39.4 (102.9)	41.3 (106.3)	36.0 (96.8)	30.7 (87.3)	26.8 (80.2)	23.0 (73.4)	21.9 (71.4)	24.2 (75.6)	28.8 (83.8)	30.0 (86.0)	33.8 (92.8)	36.3 (97.3)	41.3 (106.3)
Mean maximum °C (°F)	32.5 (90.5)	32.3 (90.1)	29.9 (85.8)	25.5 (77.9)	22.3 (72.1)	18.7 (65.7)	18.3 (64.9)	20.2 (68.4)	23.6 (74.5)	26.0 (78.8)	28.3 (82.9)	30.9 (87.6)	33.7 (92.7)
Mean daily maximum °C (°F)	23.1 (73.6)	22.9 (73.2)	20.9 (69.6)	17.6 (63.7)	14.7 (58.5)	11.8 (53.2)	11.3 (52.3)	13.0 (55.4)	15.7 (60.3)	17.6 (63.7)	19.4 (66.9)	21.6 (70.9)	17.5 (63.4)
Daily mean °C (°F)	17.1 (62.8)	16.8 (62.2)	15.0 (59.0)	12.0 (53.6)	9.3 (48.7)	6.6 (43.9)	5.9 (42.6)	7.6 (45.7)	10.0 (50.0)	11.8 (53.2)	13.5 (56.3)	15.8 (60.4)	11.8 (53.2)
Mean daily minimum °C (°F)	11.0 (51.8)	10.7 (51.3)	9.0 (48.2)	6.3 (43.3)	3.9 (39.0)	1.3 (34.3)	0.5 (32.9)	2.2 (36.0)	4.2 (39.6)	5.9 (42.6)	7.6 (45.7)	9.9 (49.8)	6.0 (42.9)
Mean minimum °C (°F)	4.8 (40.6)	5.0 (41.0)	2.7 (36.9)	0.6 (33.1)	−1.3 (29.7)	−3.4 (25.9)	−4.2 (24.4)	−2.6 (27.3)	−1.7 (28.9)	0.1 (32.2)	1.7 (35.1)	4.0 (39.2)	−4.7 (23.5)
Record low °C (°F)	0.3 (32.5)	−0.4 (31.3)	−1.3 (29.7)	−3.2 (26.2)	−6.7 (19.9)	−7.1 (19.2)	−11.6 (11.1)	−7.8 (18.0)	−4.8 (23.4)	−3.2 (26.2)	−2.9 (26.8)	−1.5 (29.3)	−11.6 (11.1)
Average rainfall mm (inches)	60.3 (2.37)	54.8 (2.16)	57.2 (2.25)	65.7 (2.59)	61.3 (2.41)	65.7 (2.59)	62.4 (2.46)	64.4 (2.54)	50.9 (2.00)	60.3 (2.37)	60.5 (2.38)	60.2 (2.37)	723.7 (28.49)
Mean monthly sunshine hours	225.8	201.3	192.2	180.7	156.3	133.6	153.7	166.0	207.8	233.1	245.3	217.4	2,313.2
Mean daily daylight hours	15.0	13.8	12.3	10.8	9.6	9.0	9.3	10.4	11.8	13.4	14.7	15.4	12.1
Percentage possible sunshine	49	52	50	56	53	49	53	51	59	56	56	46	53
Source 1: NIWA
Source 2: Weather Spark

=== Rivers and lakes ===
The Ashburton River / Hakatere flows across Mid Canterbury from the Southern Alps to the Pacific Ocean. The official name of the river was amended to become a dual name by the Ngāi Tahu Claims Settlement Act 1998. The river passes through the town of Ashburton, separating the south-east suburb of Tinwald from the rest of the town. The nearest beach to Ashburton is Wakanui beach, but is not safe for swimming due to a strong undertow. In part to rectify the limitations imposed by the lack of recreational waterways, Lake Hood was constructed just south-east of Tinwald.

The Ashburton Lakes is a region of high-country lakes and wetlands located around 74 km (46 mi) from Ashburton in inland Canterbury. The region is a glacial inter-montane basin between the Rangitata and Rakaia rivers, and includes Lake Heron, Lake Camp and Lake Clearwater. On the road to these lakes are Mount Somers and the Mount Somers walkway.

== Governance ==
Ashburton District Council is the territorial authority for the Ashburton District of New Zealand. The council is led by the mayor of Ashburton, who is currently Liz McMillan. There are also nine ward councillors.

== Demographics ==
Ashburton is described by Statistics New Zealand as a medium urban area, and covers 39.99 km^{2} (15.44 sq mi). It had an estimated population of 21,600 as of June 2025, with a population density of 540 people per km^{2}.

The population of Ashburton was recorded as 2,322 in the 1901 census, 8,287 in the 1951 census, 10,176 in the 1956 census and 11,604 in the 1961 census.

Historical population
Year	Pop.	±% p.a.
2006	16,188	—
2013	17,967	+1.50%
2018	19,356	+1.50%
2023	20,346	+1.00%
The 2006 population is for a smaller area of 37.93 km^{2}. Source:

Ashburton had a population of 20,346 in the 2023 New Zealand census, an increase of 990 people (5.1%) since the 2018 census, and an increase of 2,379 people (13.2%) since the 2013 census. There were 9,978 males, 10,314 females, and 54 people of other genders in 8,124 dwellings. 2.4% of people identified as LGBTIQ+. The median age was 43.1 years (compared with 38.1 years nationally). There were 3,645 people (17.9%) aged under 15 years, 3,270 (16.1%) aged 15 to 29, 8,583 (42.2%) aged 30 to 64, and 4,845 (23.8%) aged 65 or older.

People could identify as more than one ethnicity. The results were 80.2% European (Pākehā); 9.1% Māori; 8.8% Pasifika; 8.3% Asian; 1.1% Middle Eastern, Latin American and African New Zealanders (MELAA); and 1.9% other, which includes people giving their ethnicity as "New Zealander". English was spoken by 97.0%, Māori by 1.5%, Samoan by 2.5%, and other languages by 9.8%. No language could be spoken by 1.9% (e.g. too young to talk). New Zealand Sign Language was known by 0.4%. The percentage of people born overseas was 19.7, compared with 28.8% nationally.

Religious affiliations were 41.4% Christian, 1.0% Hindu, 0.8% Islam, 0.4% Māori religious beliefs, 0.6% Buddhist, 0.3% New Age, and 1.0% other religions. People who answered that they had no religion were 46.8%, and 7.8% of people did not answer the census question.

Of those at least 15 years old, 2,007 (12.0%) people had a bachelor's or higher degree, 9,351 (56.0%) had a post-high school certificate or diploma, and 5,340 (32.0%) people exclusively held high school qualifications. The median income was $38,000, compared with $41,500 nationally. 1,074 people (6.4%) earned over $100,000 compared to 12.1% nationally. The employment status of those at least 15 was 8,013 (48.0%) full-time, 2,304 (13.8%) part-time, and 327 (2.0%) unemployed.

Individual statistical areas
Name	Area (km^{2})	Population	Density (per km^{2})	Dwellings	Median age	Median income
Allenton North	2.10	2,703	1,287	1,128	51.6 years	$37,100
Allenton South	2.93	2,211	755	849	37.4 years	$42,000
Allenton East	1.24	2,199	1,733	861	45.4 years	$37,400
Ashburton North	20.66	1,152	56	414	46.7 years	$47,600
Ashburton Central	2.56	162	63	75	58.7 years	$30,400
Ashburton West	0.45	954	2,120	450	56.0 years	$30,800
Ashburton East	0.78	1,743	2,235	810	48.5 years	$32,100
Netherby	1.94	2,442	1,259	861	37.5 years	$37,700
Hampstead	2.64	3,021	1,144	1,206	37.6 years	$38,000
Tinwald North	1.90	1,461	769	582	40.9 years	$46,500
Tinwald South	2.79	2,295	823	894	41.4 years	$36,800
New Zealand					38.1 years	$41,500

== Economy ==
Ashburton lies in the middle of the fertile alluvial Canterbury Plains which sustains agricultural activity including dairying, provided irrigation is used. More than 100 local farmers grow potatoes, corn and peas which are processed locally.

The economy of Ashburton is influenced by the economy of the Ashburton District as a whole. In the year to March 2020, the gross domestic product (GDP) of Ashburton District was $2,506M, representing 0.8% of New Zealand's total GDP. The largest proportion of the Ashburton District GDP is derived from primary industries, at 27.0%. This is substantially higher than the 6.2% contribution of primary industries to the national GDP. The next highest contribution to the district GDP was from 'Other services' representing 26.7% in the district GDP, versus 34.7% in the national economy. Goods-producing industries were 21.3%, versus 18.7% in the national economy. High-value services (such as knowledge-based service industries) represented the smallest proportion in Ashburton District GDP, at 10.2%, versus 25.6% in the national economy.

The town has businesses providing a wide range of services to farming in the district, including seed merchants, livestock companies, farm machinery dealers, banks, lawyers and accountants.

The Ashburton District Council has a 40% holding in the company that manages the Rangitata Diversion Race. This scheme diverts water from the Rangitata and South Ashburton rivers into a canal that provides irrigation to large parts of the district.

A vegetable processing factory owned by Talley's is located on the northern outskirts of Ashburton. The factory was built in 1996 to take advantage of the good soils and irrigation of the Ashburton district. The factory processes peas, corn and potatoes. The potatoes are made into French fries, hash browns and wedges. Much of what is processed is exported to overseas customers. The factory employs 360 staff.

Ashburton was home to a lamb processing works from the early 1900s until 2017, when it was closed with the loss of 370 staff due to declining lamb numbers in Canterbury. The pelt house closed in 2019 with the loss of a further 44 staff. Talley's purchased the site in 2020 and had plans to use it to support vegetable production and use the cool stores for their frozen produce.

In 2012, Ashburton was noted for having more cooperative companies operating in its district than in any other area of New Zealand, and was subsequently named by the New Zealand Cooperatives Association the "Cooperative Capital of New Zealand". Several of the 40-plus companies are national companies based outside the district, such as Fonterra, Foodstuffs and Silver Fern Farms (meat processing), but many were local cooperatives, such as the Ashburton Trading Society (farm supplies) and Electricity Ashburton (electricity distribution).

== Culture ==
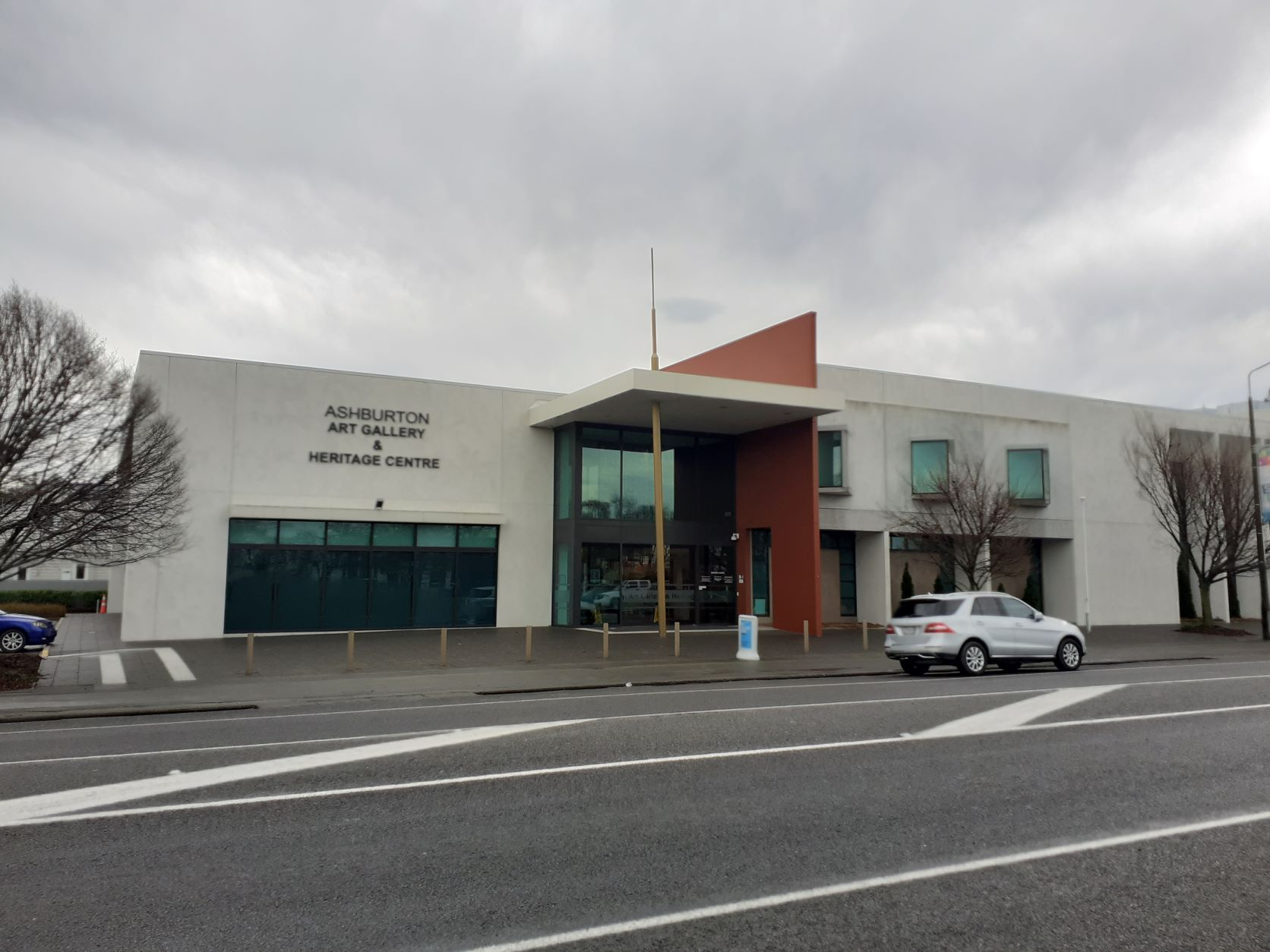
Ashburton Art Gallery and Heritage Centre (July 2021)

=== Museum and Art Gallery ===
The Ashburton Museum and Ashburton Art Gallery share one building, which sits on State Highway 1, close to the centre of town. As well as temporary exhibitions, the museum has a permanent exhibition tracing the history of the Ashburton district.

The Ashburton Museum opened in 1972 and moved along with the Ashburton Art Gallery into former County Council buildings in 1995. The museum moved into a new purpose-built facility in 2014, the art gallery following it in 2015. Both institutions merged into a single organisation under the Ashburton District Council in 2021.

=== Marae ===
The Hakatere marae is located on the northern edge of Ashburton. Although Ashburton is within the rohe or region where the Ngāi Tahu iwi are traditionally based, the Hakatere marae is not a Ngāi Tahu marae. It was built as a marae for people from all iwi. The marae is located on land that was originally the Fairton Primary School. This land was acquired in 1970 and the Hakatere marae was gazetted as a Māori reserve in 1976. The wharenui was destroyed by an arson attack in 2003. The wharekai was completed in 2007 at a cost of around $300,000.

== Attractions and amenities ==
=== Ashburton Domain ===
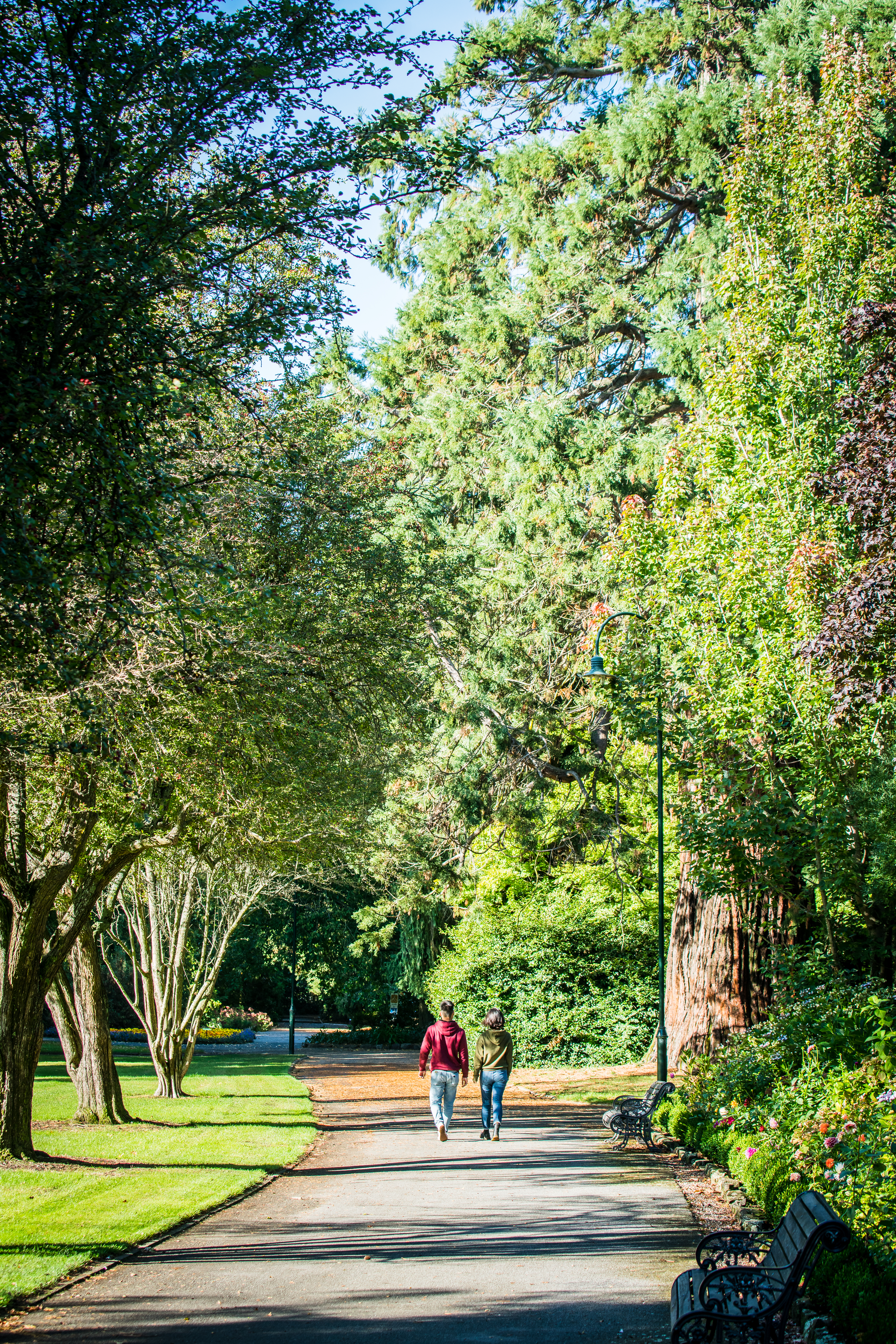
Ashburton Domain

The Ashburton Domain sits in the centre of the town next to State Highway 1. At 37 ha (91 acres) in size, it includes public gardens, cricket pitches, football fields, tennis courts, bowls club and a croquet club. A playground and paddling pool also have been built in the domain.

=== Railway museum ===
The Plains Vintage Railway and Historical Museum is located in the Tinwald Domain. The railway runs on approximately three kilometres of rural railway line that was once part of the Mount Somers Branch. There are a variety of historical buildings and trains on display.

=== Ashburton Aviation Museum ===
The museum is located at Ashburton Aerodrome and has two buildings which display almost thirty aircraft. These include a Skyhawk formerly used by the New Zealand Air Force, a Vampire FB5 and a Canberra B2 Bomber. The collection also includes the only British Aerospace HS Harrier "Jump-jet" GR3 in the southern hemisphere.

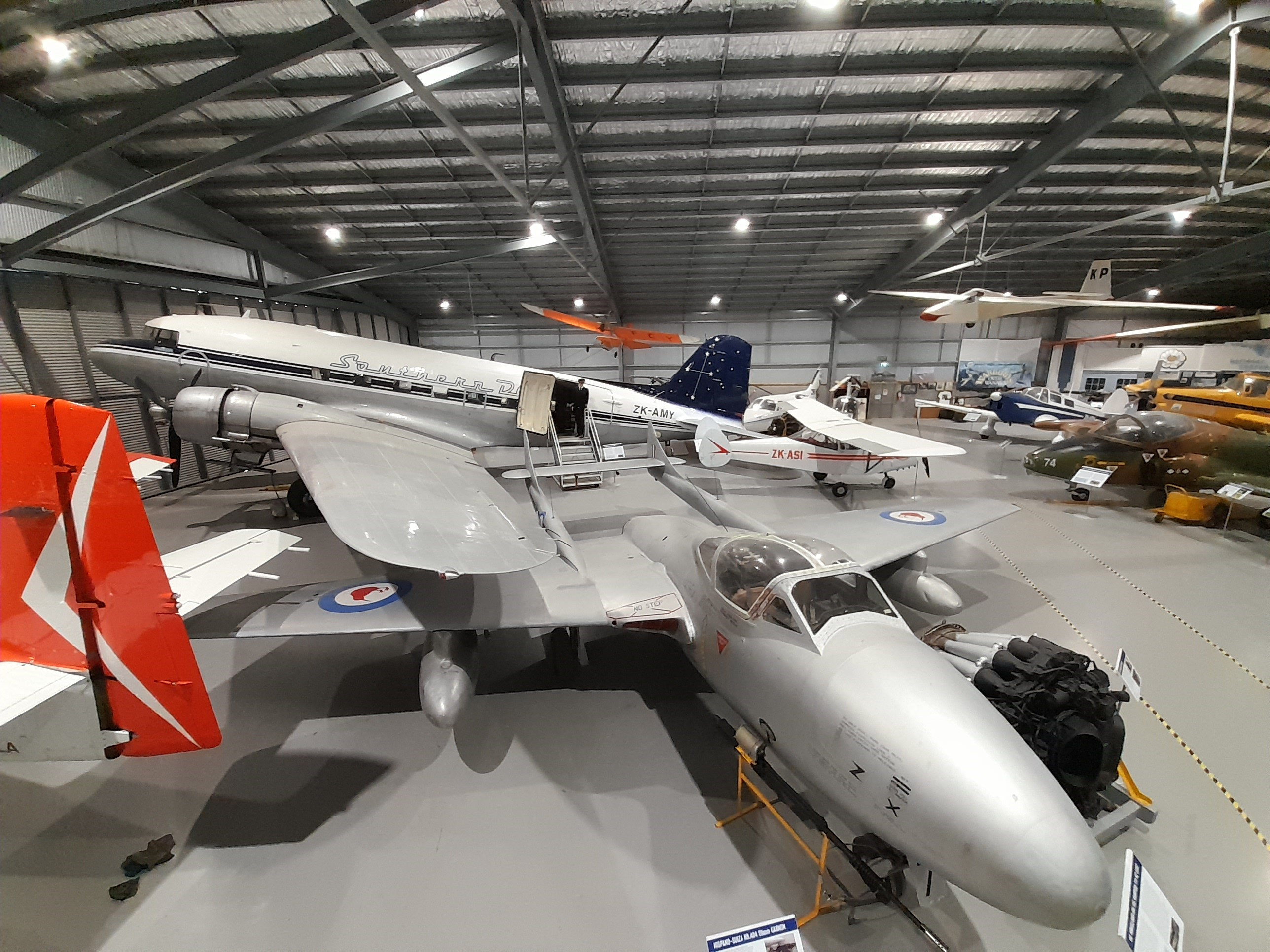
Ashburton Aviation Museum (2023)

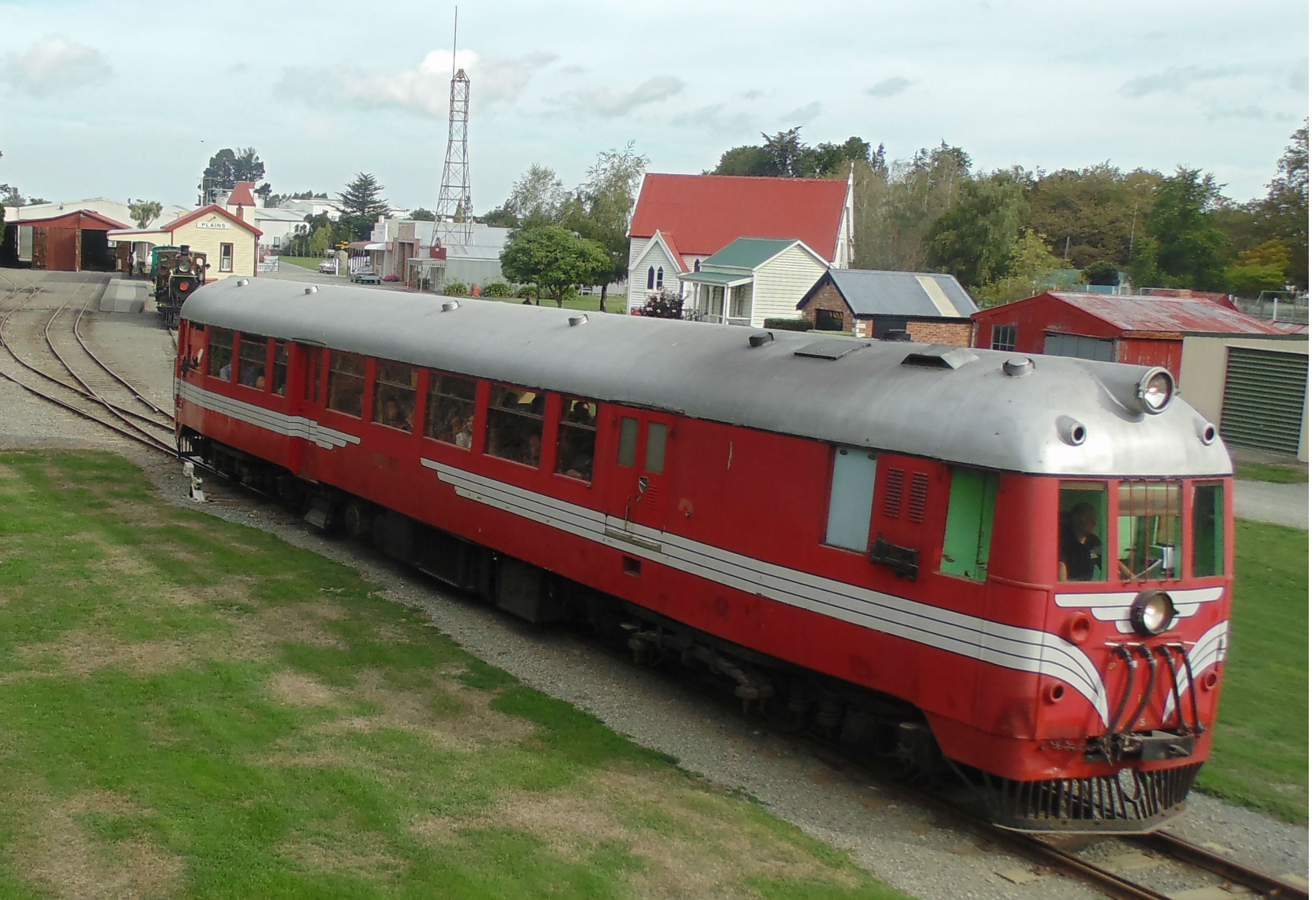
Vulcan Railcar on exhibition at the railway museum

=== Notable buildings ===
Notable buildings

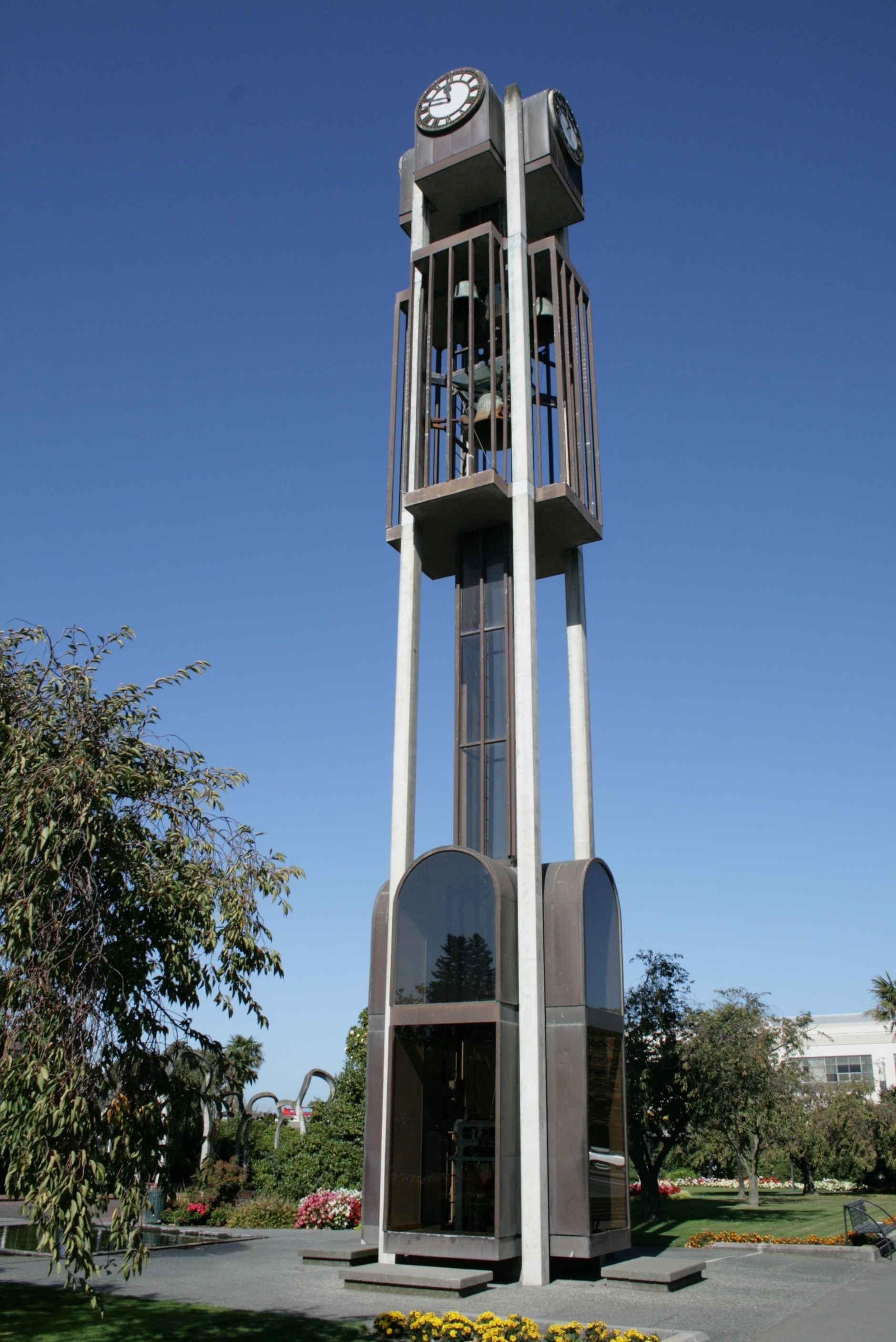
Ashburton Clock Tower (March 2008)

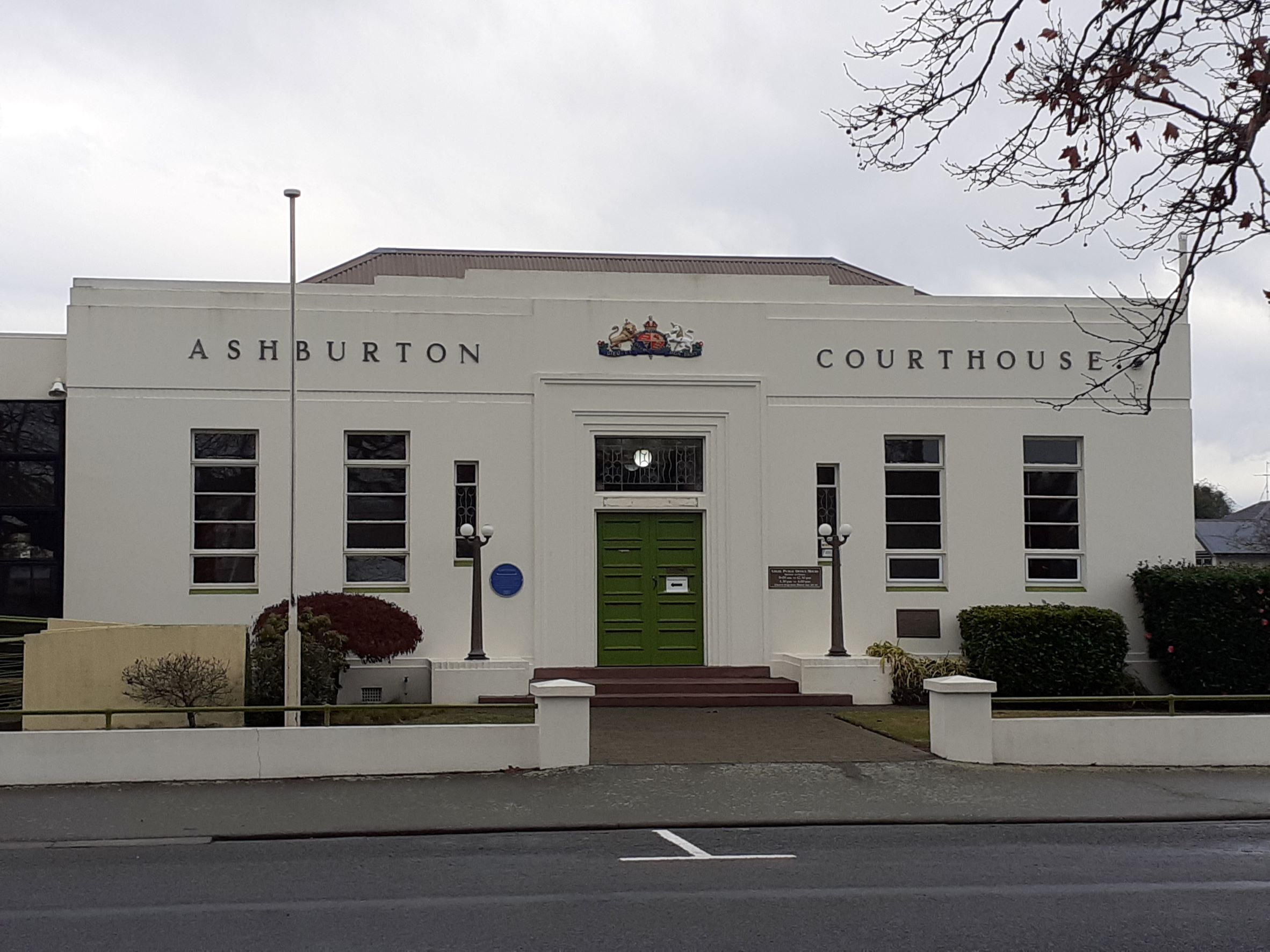
Ashburton Courthouse (July 2021)

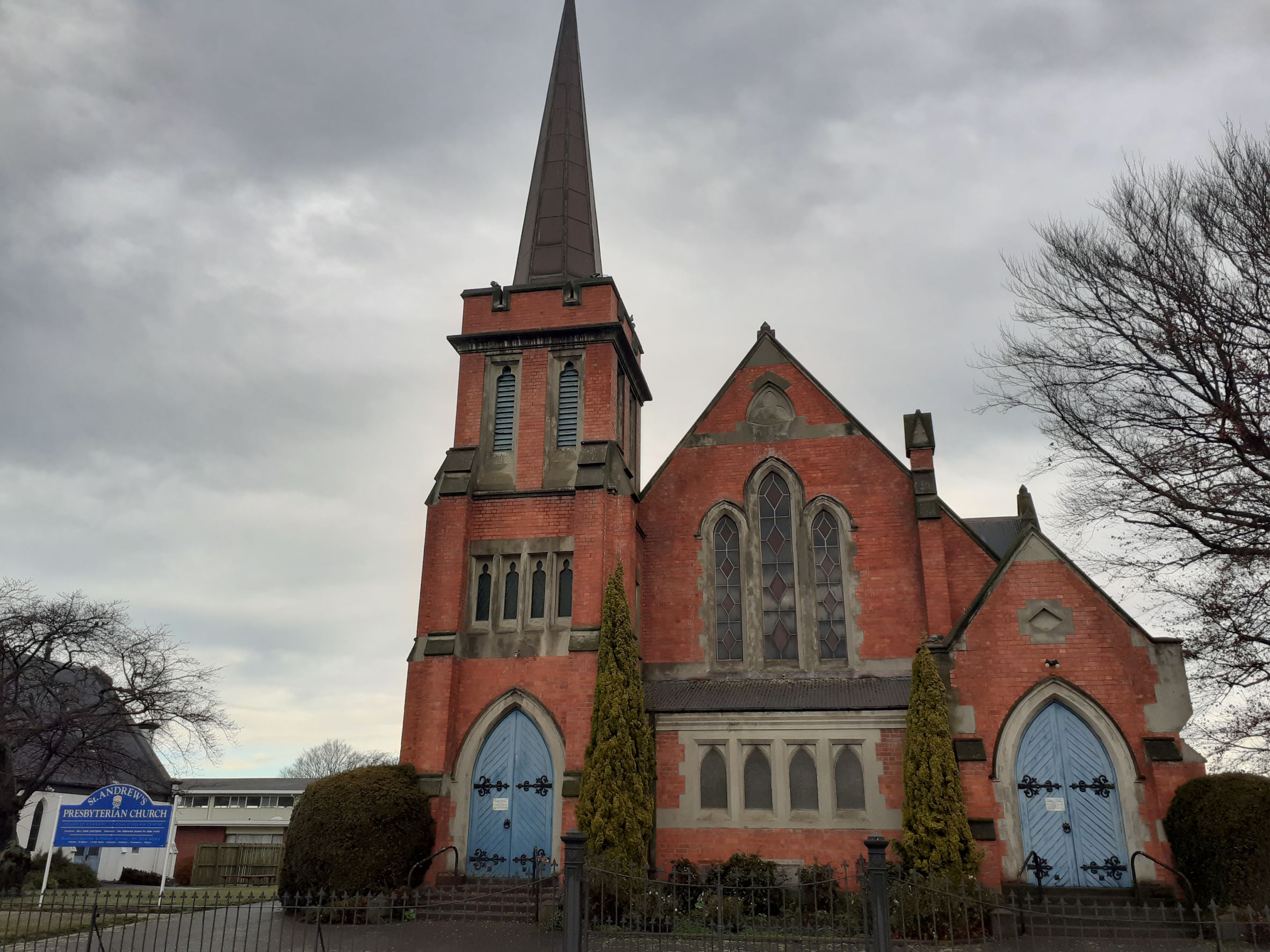
St Andrews Presbyterian Church, Ashburton (July 2021)

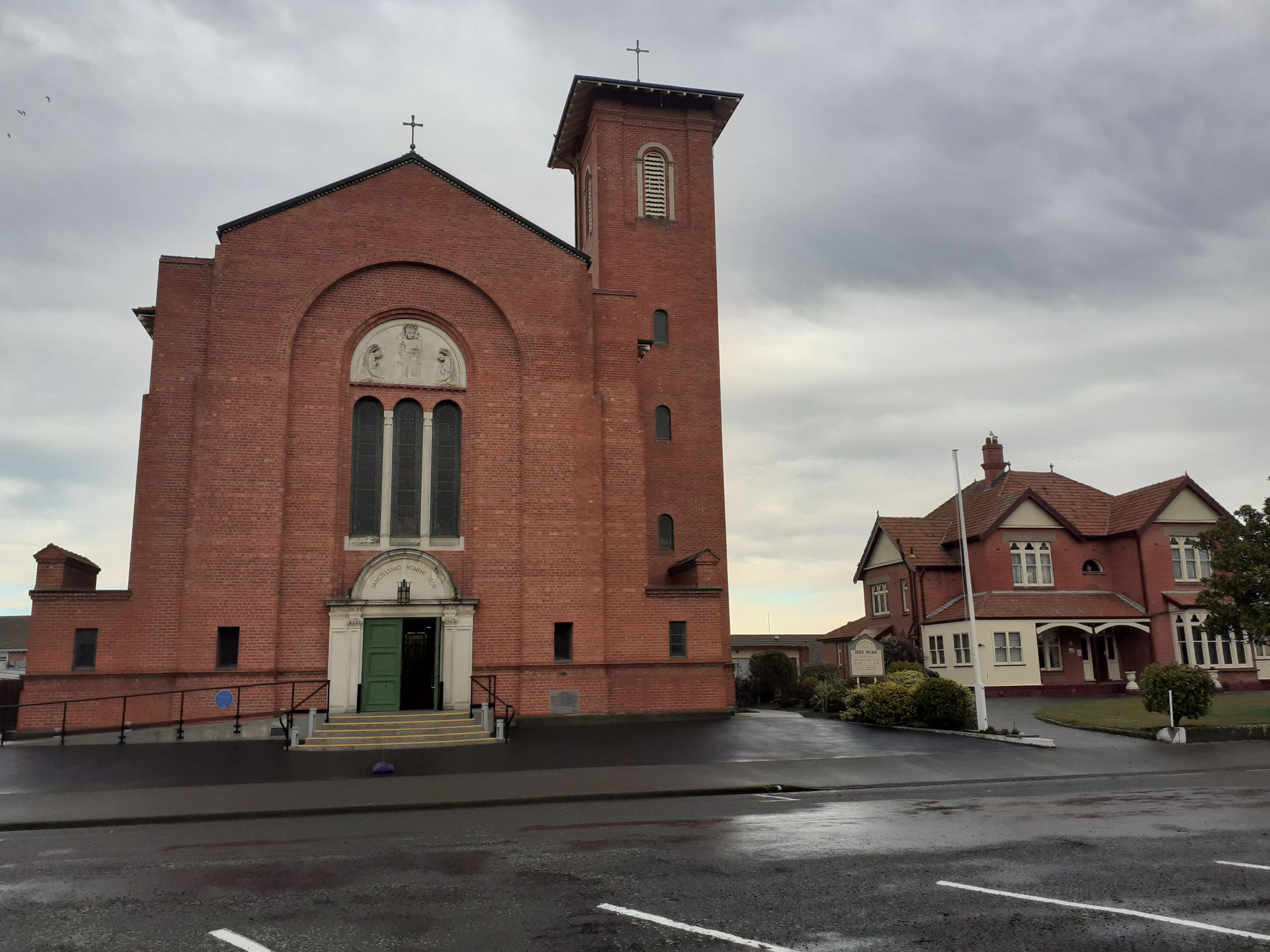
Saint Augustine of Canterbury (July 2021)

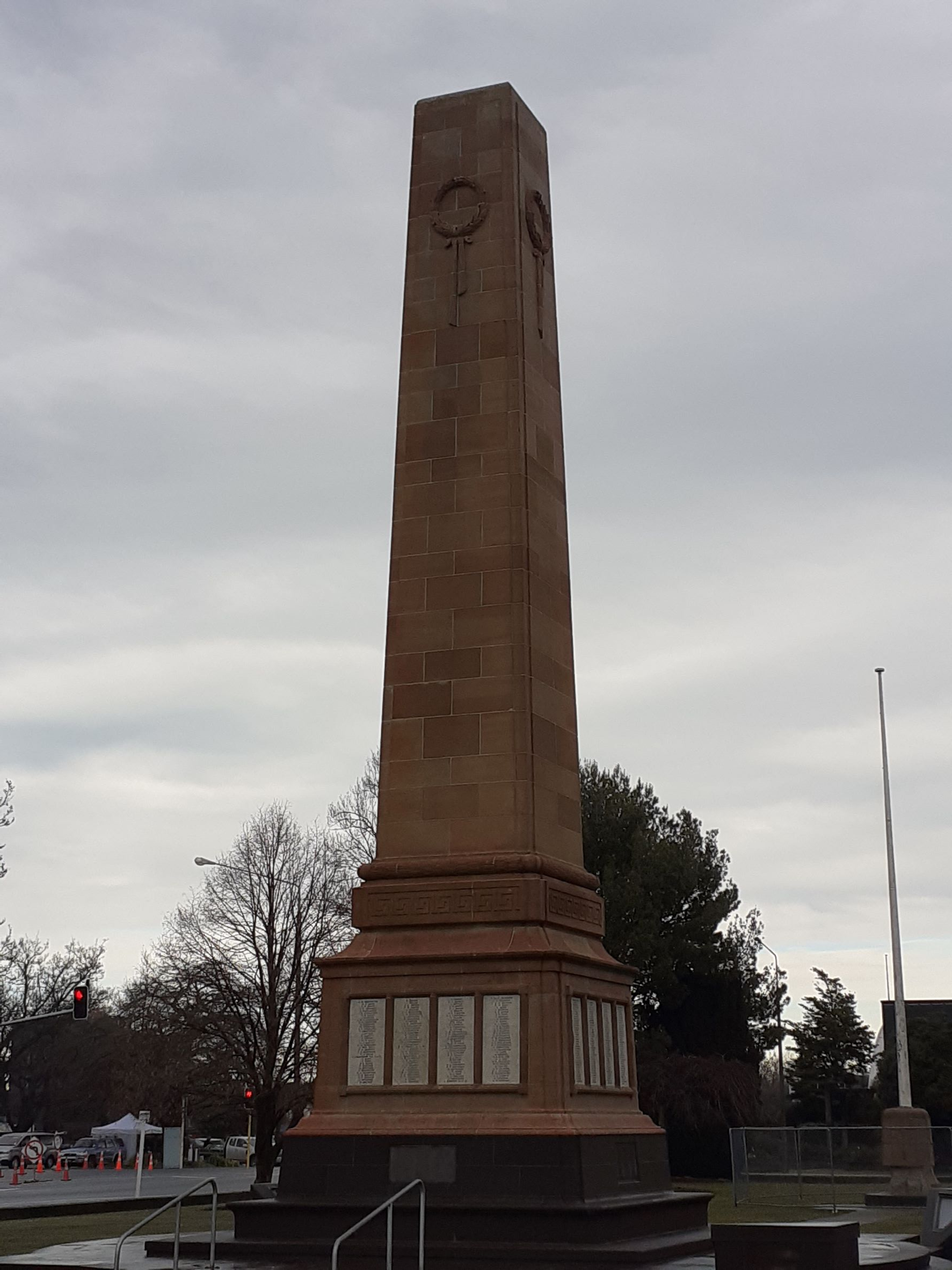
Ashburton war memorial (July 2021)

The $62 million Ashburton civic centre including the new library was built in the centre of the town adjacent to the clock tower and was opened in 2023. The Ashburton Clock Tower was designed by Warren and Mahoney Architects and built in 1976 by Bradford Construction Ltd. The clock was originally ordered in 1902 and installed in a tower of the Post Office building in 1904. It was removed in 1946 when the tower was deemed a seismic risk. The clock and its bells remained in storage until they were reinstalled in the new tower in 1976. The clock tower has won awards including for “Enduring Architecture” in 2004 from the New Zealand Institute of Architects.

The Ashburton courthouse is located on Baring Square. The Ashburton Legal Practitioners Society said in 2018 that it was “absolutely crucial” that the Ashburton courthouse is retained, noting that if it were to be closed, the nearest courthouse is either in Christchurch or Timaru. The courthouse was upgraded in the 1990s but needs further upgrades and more space.

Saint Andrews Presbyterian Church was designed by Robert and Edward England and built in 1906. It is a Heritage New Zealand category 2 listed historic place. Saint Augustine of Canterbury Catholic Church was built between 1930 and 1931. It is a Heritage New Zealand category 1 historic place.

The Ashburton war memorial is a square obelisk and was unveiled on 4 June 1928.

== Sport and recreation ==
=== Aquatic centre ===
A new aquatic centre was opened in Ashburton in May 2015, named as the EA Networks Centre. There are four indoor swimming pools within an 8000 square metre building. There are also four indoor courts and two outdoor courts and a gym. The facility is operated by the Ashburton District Council. The facility cost $30 million to develop and was designed by architects Warren & Mahoney.

=== Clubs ===
The Ashburton Club and Mutual School of Arts (MSA) was founded in 1885. The MSA is a member of the NZ Chartered Clubs Association and is located in the central town. The club itself currently has around 4,000 members on its records.

=== Golf courses ===
Ashburton is home to two golf courses. The Ashburton Golf Course is an 18-hole golf course which was established in 1895. The Tinwald Golf Club has an 18-hole course in the suburb of Tinwald. It was built in 1967.

=== Horse racing ===
The Ashburton Raceway is a horse racing venue that includes both a 1500 metre long trotting track and an 1800 metre long galloping track. There is also a Harness Racing Museum located at the racecourse. The racecourse is located off State Highway 1 at the northern end of Ashburton.

=== Mountain bike trails ===
A mountain bike trail was built by Mountain Bike Ashburton alongside the Ashburton River. The loop track is 11.5 km long.

=== Rugby ===
Ashburton is home to the Mid Canterbury Rugby Union. Mid Canterbury played in the National Provincial Championship (1976–2005) and are now in the Heartland Championship which commenced in 2006. Mid Canterbury have won:

- the 2nd division South Island in 1980 and 1983
- the 3rd division in 1994 and 1998
- the Meads Cup in 2013,2014 and 2025
- the Lochore Cup in 2017.

=== Skiing ===
Mount Hutt is the nearest ski field, located around 60 km (37 mi) inland from Ashburton, just past Methven.

=== Cricket ===
Cricket has been played in Ashburton since at least 1877. The Ashburton County Cricket Association was established in 1896 with the name being changed on its centenary to the Mid Canterbury Cricket Association in 1996. Ashburton Domain is venue for Mid Canterbury's home games. The senior men's team won national honours when they won the Hawke Cup in the 2003/04 season.

=== Speedway ===
The Ashburton Speedway provides a race track for a number of categories of cars including stockcars, production saloon cars and street stocks. They also run a demolition derby once a year. The Ashburton Speedway is located next to Ashburton Airport on Seafield road.

== Infrastructure ==
=== Ashburton Hospital ===
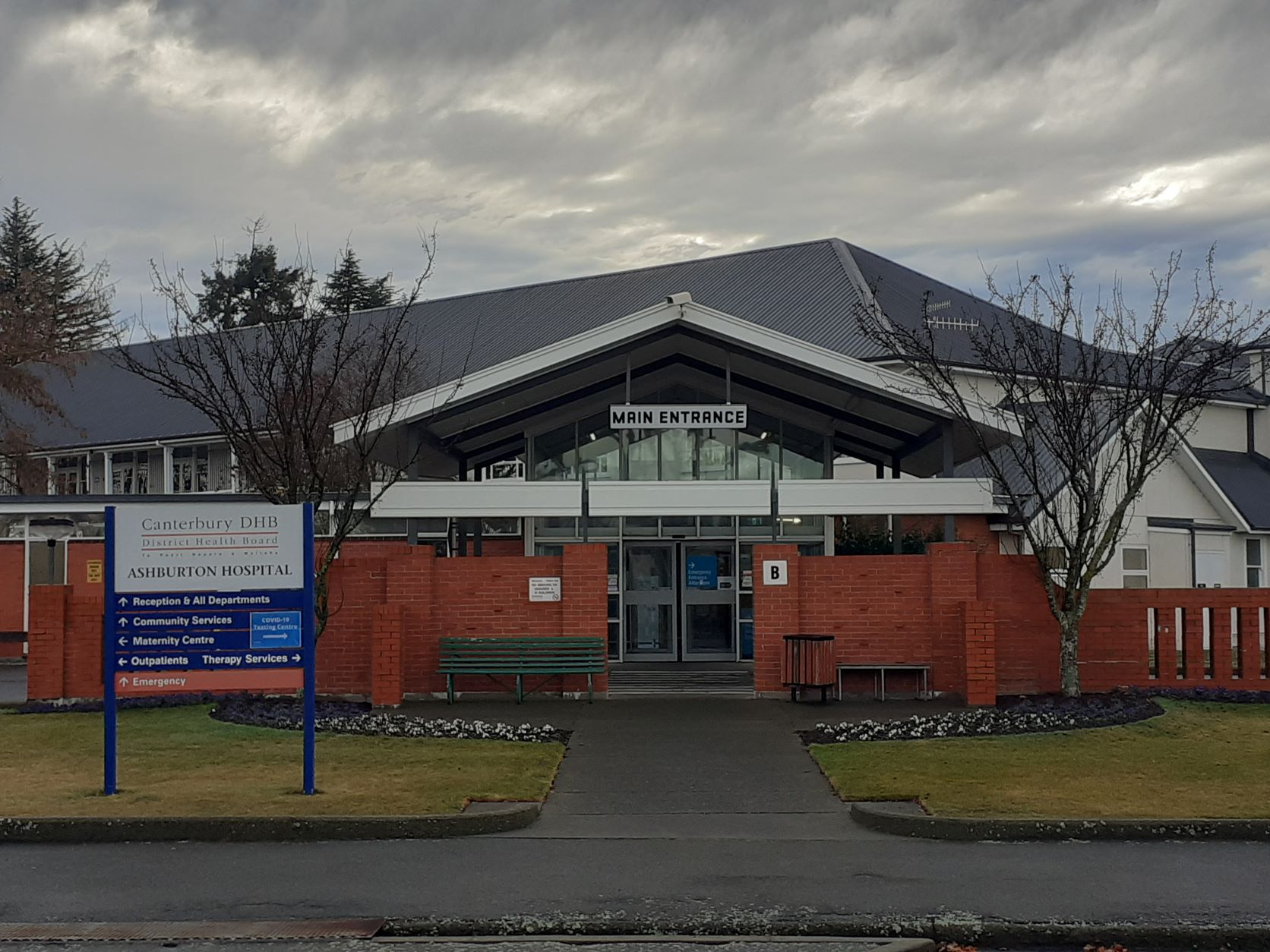
Ashburton Hospital (2021)

Ashburton Hospital is a 74-bed hospital based at 28 Elizabeth Street, Ashburton. The hospital provides medical, surgical, radiology and maternity care. It admits about 5,000 inpatients each year as well as seeing 2,600 day patients and 15,000 outpatients. It is run by Canterbury District Health Board and the rural health service employed approximately 550 staff in 2021.

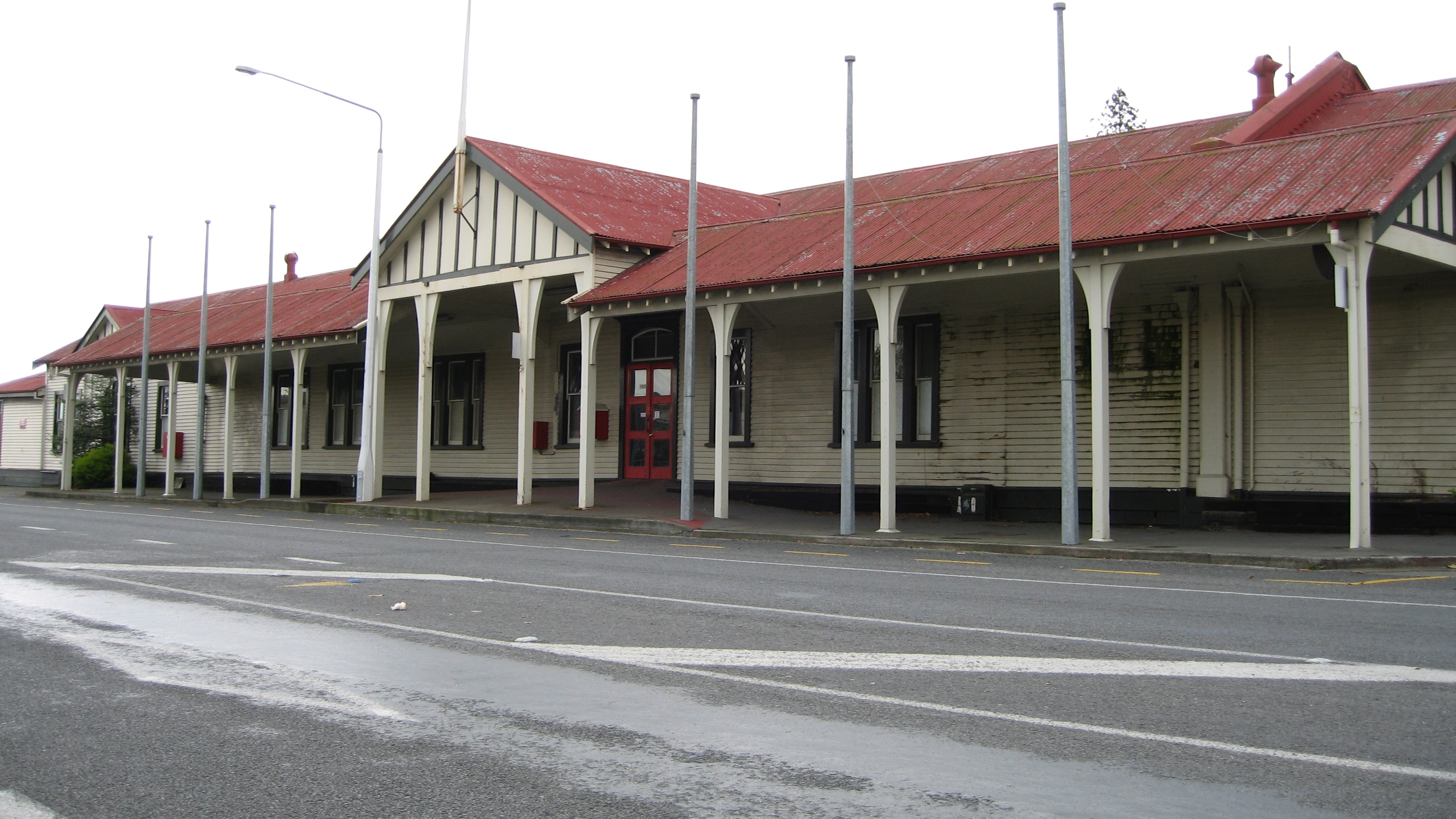
Ashburton's station building before it was demolished in 2013

=== Transport ===
==== Rail ====
The Main South Line railway line runs through the centre of town. The station opened on 24 August 1874 and the refreshment room was converted from table- to counter-service to save staff and increase the speed of service in 1944. The rooms closed in 1970, when the Southerner service was established. The service ceased on 10 February 2002, but the station is still used for freight, as some barley continues to be sent by train to maltings at Marton. The station's container terminal is in use on weekdays. The station building was demolished in 2013 after several resource consent hearings. The stations footbridge still remains, and is used for crossing the rail corridor.

Tinwald was the junction for the now-closed Mount Somers Branch railway line. The station opened as Ashburton South on 31 May 1875. It was renamed Tinwald from 18 March 1878, and closed on 11 October 1981 to all but private siding traffic. Part of the branch still operates as the Plains Vintage Railway.

Funding from the New Zealand government and the Ashburton District Council for a new rail freight hub was provided in October 2021. The project will move the rail container terminal from the centre of Ashburton to Fairton. The project is expected to be complete by the end of 2022, and has an estimated cost of $14M. It should help ease congestion on the roads in the centre of Ashburton.

==== Road ====
State Highway 1 runs through the centre of Ashburton and provides the main road connection between Christchurch and Dunedin. The highway crosses the Ashburton river via a bridge that is the only direct route across the river for local traffic and State Highway 1 traffic.

===== SH1 Ashburton river bridge =====
The bridge on State Highway 1 crossing the Ashburton river was opened in 1931, and was the first 22 feet (6.7 m) wide bridge in New Zealand. On 1 June 2021, a severe flood in the Ashburton river caused scouring damage to piers supporting the bridge, and the bridge deck subsided, leading to a temporary closure. At the time of closure, there were no other routes for SH1 traffic wanting to go north or south across the Ashburton river, because all inland routes were also closed. On 3 June 2021, the bridge was re-opened for heavy traffic during daylight hours only, and all restrictions were lifted on 10 June.

The Ashburton District Council has been trying to obtain funding from Waka Kotahi (New Zealand Transport Agency) for a second bridge for local traffic and to provide more resilience to the road network. In 2021, the additional bridge was planned to be built in 15 years time.

===== Other routes =====
State Highway 77 starts in Ashburton and heads towards Methven, and then through the Rakaia gorge and on to Darfield.

==== Air ====
The Ashburton Airport is located near the town centre and is an active light (GA and Microlight) aviation hub and home of the Mid Canterbury Aero Club (GA) and Ashburton Aviation Pioneers.

In October 2021, the future of how the airport was being operated was being debated as managing the challenge of increasing aviation activity with the desire to develop the land around the airport could cause conflict due to the potential of noise pollution from the airport.

=== Electricity ===
Electricity first arrived in Ashburton in 1908. This was supplied by a 30 kilowatt generator powered by a steam traction engine. In 1921 the Ashburton Electric Power Board was established and by 1927 it had 2804 customers.

The local electricity distribution network company was formed as Electricity Ashburton in 1995 after a reorganisation of the Ashburton Electric Power Board into a commercial company. It adopted its current trading name EA Networks in late 2012. It is unique among New Zealand electricity distribution companies in that it is the only company that is a cooperative, whereby shares in the company are owned by electricity consumers connected to its network.

EA Networks owns and operates the subtransmission and distribution network in the Ashburton District . Outside the Ashburton township (pop. 17,700), most of the district is rural with a high usage of irrigation, with the associated water pumps responsible for more than 85 percent of EA Networks' peak summer demand.

== Education ==
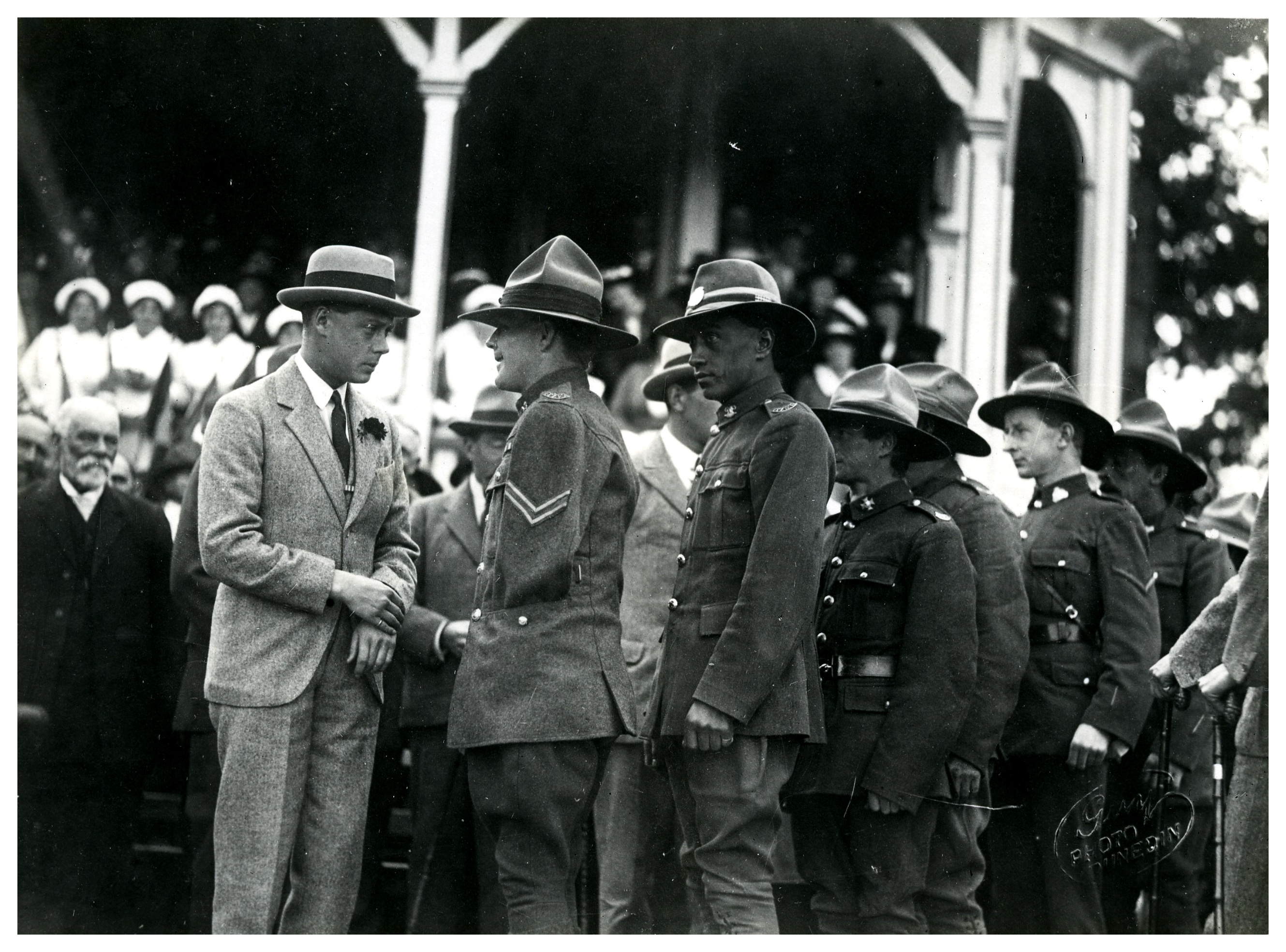
Prince Edward (later Edward VIII) in Ashburton, Royal Tour (1920)

There are seven primary schools, an intermediate school, a secondary school and a composite school in Ashburton. All rolls are as of July 2026.

- Allenton School is a state contributing primary (Year 1–6) school. It has a roll of 437 students. It opened in 1897.
- Ashburton Borough School is a state full primary (Year 1–8) school. It has a roll of 248 students. It opened in 1872.
- Ashburton Netherby School is a state contributing primary school. The school opened in 1959. It has a roll of 189 students.
- Fairton School is a state contributing primary school. It opened in 1901. It has a roll of 31 students.
- Hampstead School is a state contributing primary school. It opened in 1884 as Trevorton Side School and became the independent Hampstead School in 1886. It has a roll of 309 students.
- St Joseph's School is a state-integrated Catholic full primary school. It was formed from a merger of Sacred Heart School, previously called The Select School, which had operated since 1880, mostly as a boys school; and St Patrick's School for girls, which had separated from The Select School in the 1880s. It has a roll of 244 students.
- Tinwald School is a state contributing primary school. It opened in 1879 and merged with Huntingdon School (opened 1895) in 1926. It has a roll of 263 students.

Ashburton Intermediate School is a state intermediate (Year 7–8) school. The school opened in 1974. It has a roll of 436 students.

Ashburton College is a state secondary (Year 9–13) school. The school opened in 1965 following the merger of Ashburton High School (opened 1881) and Hakatere College (opened in 1912 as Ashburton Technical School, later called Ashburton Technical College, and renamed Hakatere College in 1963). It has a roll of 1,391 students.

Ashburton Christian School is a state-integrated evangelical Christian composite (Year 1–13) school. The school opened in February 2009 as a private school, and integrated into the state system in July 2011. It has a roll of 261 students.

== Media ==
Ashburton media includes the Ashburton Guardian daily newspaper, the Mid Canterbury Herald, a free weekly community newspaper owned by Fairfax Media which comes out every Wednesday, The Courier, another free weekly community newspaper owned by the Otago Daily Times, and the Mid Canterbury-focused AshburtonOnline website. Radio Port FM is based in Timaru; Newstalk ZB and Classic Hits ZEFM are re-broadcast from other out-of-town stations.

== Notable people ==
- Notable people from Ashburton have included the former Prime Minister of New Zealand, Jenny Shipley, international concert pianist Tessa Birnie, international operatic tenor Simon O'Neill, Olympic silver medal cyclist Hayden Roulston and New Zealand television and radio personalities Simon Barnett and Robyn Malcolm.
- Rugby union players Chris King and Fergie McCormick were born in Ashburton.
- Hugo Friedlander was the second Mayor of Ashburton (1879–1881, 1890–1892 and 1898–1901), but left for Auckland in 1918 due to anti-German feelings caused by WWI.
- John Grigg was a local landowner and Member of Parliament in the mid 19th century.
- Dorothy Eden, a prolific novelist, grew up in Ashburton.
- The kite maker Peter Lynn is based In Ashburton.
- Sid Scales (1916–2003), cartoonist for the Otago Daily Times, was born in Ashburton.

== Sources ==
- Reed, A. W. (2002). The Reed Dictionary of New Zealand Place Names. Auckland: Reed Books. ISBN 0-7900-0761-4.
- Ross, John Edward; Hickman, C. P. (1977), Focus on Ashburton N.Z. (1st ed.), Ashburton: John Edward Ross, Wikidata Q133287621
