= Broom grass =

Broom grass is a name used for different types of grass around the world.

- In tropical Asia, it refers to Thysanolaena maxima of the family Poaceae; a tall, <3m, grass which is used for making brooms.
- In the United States, it refers to Andropogon glomeratus of the family Poaceae, a tall grass, growing to about 2m high.
