= Ashburton County =

Coordinates: 43°54′20″S 171°44′44″E

- County of New Zealand
- 1876–1989
- Capital: Ashburton, New Zealand
- History
  - Established: 1876
  - Disestablished: 1989
- Today part of: Canterbury region

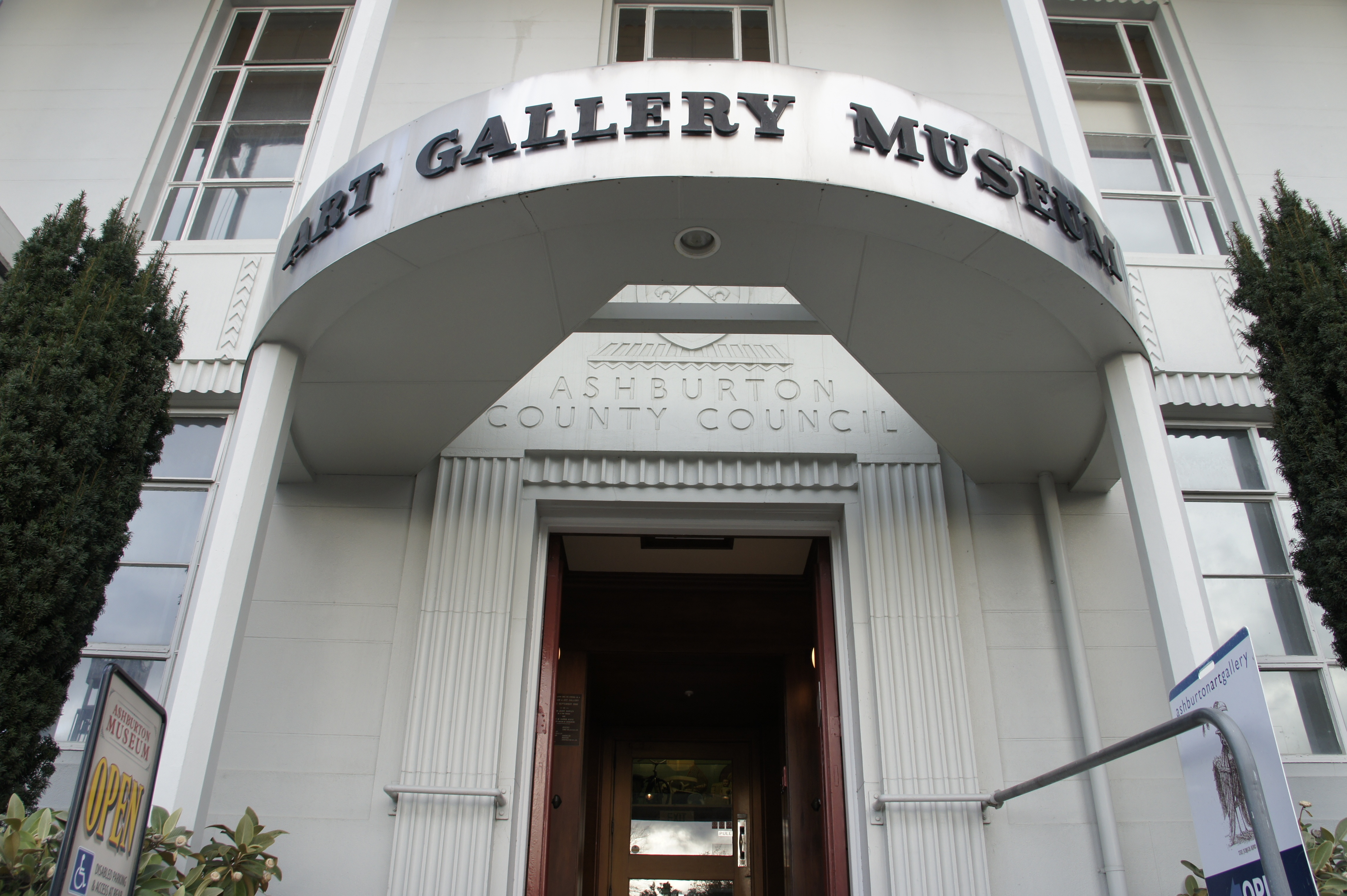
Ashburton County Council office designed by Cecil Wood

Ashburton County was one of the counties of New Zealand in the South Island. The council first met on 4 January 1877 in the Ashburton Road Board office. It became part of Ashburton District Council in 1989, together with Ashburton Borough Council.

== See also ==
- List of former territorial authorities in New Zealand § Counties
