= Midland Rail Heritage Trust =

Rail preservation group in New Zealand

Coordinates: 43°19′52.36″S 171°55′40.82″E

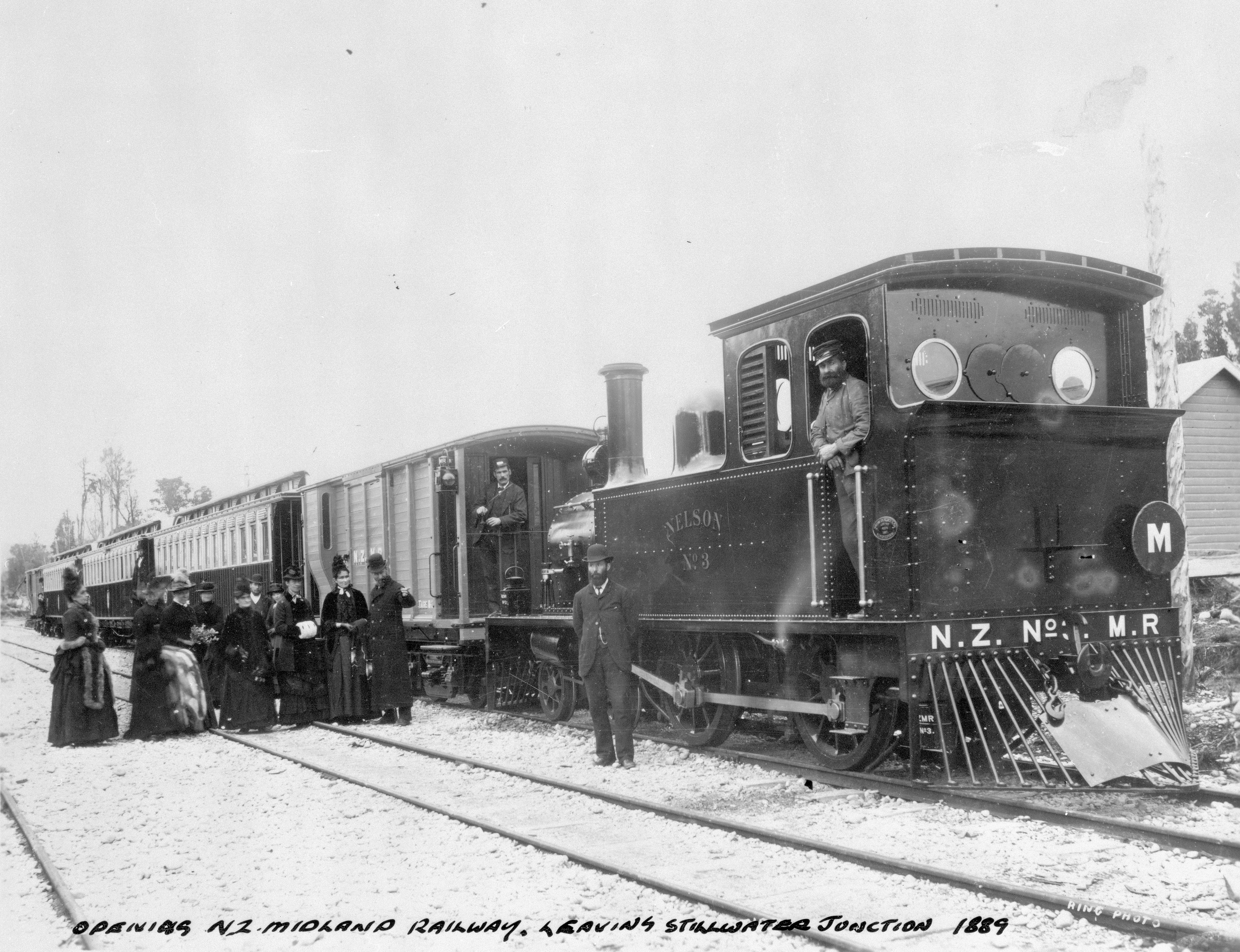
L^{A} 312 on 1 January 1889 for the opening of the Midland Railway, Stillwater junction.

The Midland Rail Heritage Trust was founded on 28 April 2004 by a group of railway enthusiasts to preserve and promote the Midland Railway line and the steam locomotives that worked it. It is based at the Old Railway Yards, Pococks Road, Springfield. The Trust is a member of the Federation of Rail Organisations of New Zealand. The Trust is also the owner and sole shareholder of the Midland Railway Company (NZ) Limited. As of 2021, Mainline Steam Heritage Trust's Christchurch depot was moved to here after the owner of the old depot in Middleton asked them to move on.

== History ==
The Trust was formed in April 2004. It was incorporated under the Charitable Trusts Act 1957 on 27 May 2004.

In 2005, three locomotives that had been dumped in the Grey River at Omoto were recovered. They were Uc 369, Uc 370 and La 312. White Bus Family Production's had obtained the resource consent for the recovery and gave Uc369 and Uc370 to the Trust on the understanding that should the Trust fold then ownership would return to it. Ownership of La 312 was retained by White Bus Family Production.

Also in 2005, a pair of diesel shunters from the Islington Freezing works were donated to the Trust, and a 15 tonne gantry crane and equipment from the Otira Railway Workshop was acquired. In 2008, track was obtained from the old Burnham Army Camp siding. The lines from the old railway yard were connected to the Kiwirail network in January 2010. Through 2011 with the help of four workers from a Work and Income job scheme buildings were repaired and track work was undertaken.

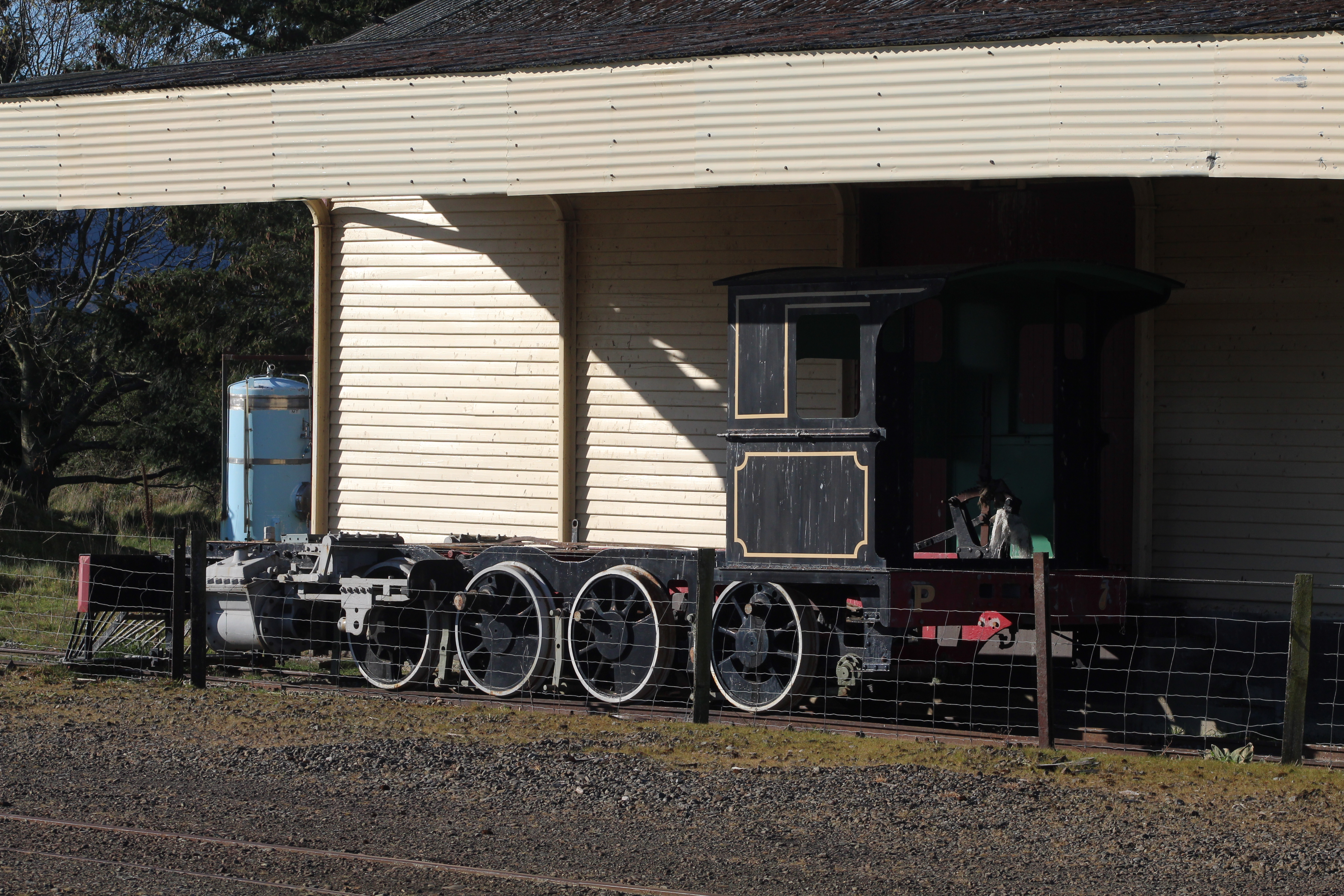
Steam locomotive, P class no. 107.

The Trust's secretary in 2012 was Simon Walker. At that time, the club made a submission to Parliament opposing the Gambling (Gambling Harm Reduction) Amendment Bill as they considered it would remove a source of funding from charitable gaming trusts that the club used.

== Locomotives and rolling stock ==
=== Locomotives ===
Key:	In service	In service, Mainline Certified	Under overhaul/restoration	Stored	Static display	Scrapped

Number	Builder	Builder's number	Year built	Arrived in Springfield	Notes
DS 134 (pre-TMS: D^{S} 213)	Drewry	2411/D160	1953	2005	Entered NZR service in June 1953. Renumbered as DS 134 in 1978. Withdrawn from service in November 1982 in Christchurch. It was then sold to the Islington Freezing Works for shunting uses. It was later repainted into PPC's white livery. In 2005 the MRHT purchased it and is currently in storage awaiting restoration. In Late 2021, shunting occurred, moving Mainline Steam's carriages and tanks around the yard with DS 134 in operation.
DS 157 (pre-TMS: D^{S} 215)	Drewry	2413/D162	1953	2005	Entered NZR service in May 1953. Renumbered as DS 157 in 1978. Withdrawn from service in November 1982 in Christchurch. It was then sold to the Islington Freezing Works for part supply for DS 134. In 2005 the MRHT purchased it and is currently in storage with no plans for restoration.
L^{A} 312	Nasmyth Wilson & Co	322	1887	2005	Entered service for the New Zealand Midland Railway Company in 1887 as NZMRC No. 3 for the construction of the Midland Line. It was then purchased by the NZR in 1900 and reclassified as L^{A} 312. Withdrawn in 1928 and dumped at the Omoto locomotive dump. It was recovered privately and is currently on loan to the MRHT for future restoration.
P 107	Nasmyth Wilson & Co	278	1883	2008	Entered NZR service in May 1887. Withdrawn from service in 1928. It was then dumped in the Clutha River on 8 August 1932. Recovered by Project Steam in 1992 and moved to Dunedin. It was later transferred to the Dunedin Gas Works. In 2008 redevelopment occurring at the Gas Works necessitating the group's removal from the Gas Works and is currently leased to the MRHT for restoration.
U^{C} 369	Sharp, Stewart & Co.	4753	1901	2005	Entered NZR service in 1901 and reclassified. Withdrawn in 1957 and dumped at the Omoto locomotive dump. It was recovered by the MRHT for future restoration.
U^{C} 370	Sharp, Stewart & Co.	4754	1901	2005	Entered NZR service in 1901 and reclassified. Withdrawn in 1957 and dumped at the Omoto locomotive dump. It was recovered by the MRHT for future restoration.

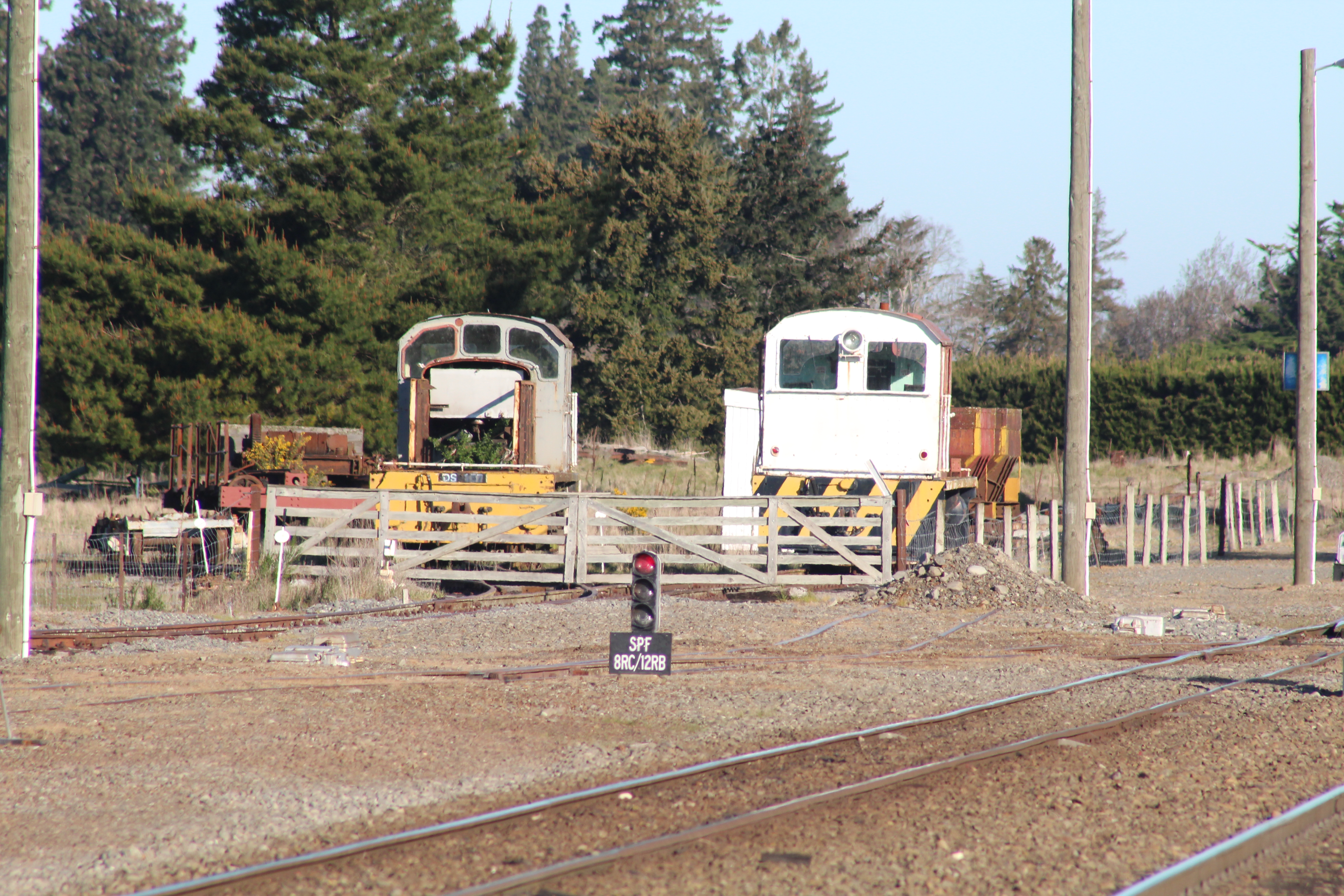
Ds class shunting locomotives nos. 213 and 215.

- The MRHT has also in their care is the tender body from U 194.

=== Carriages ===
Key:	In service	In service, Mainline Certified	Under overhaul/restoration	Stored	Static display	Scrapped

Number	Builder	Year built	Arrived in Springfield	Notes
Al 1764 (TMS AL 50090)	NZR Addington Workshops	1932	2013	Entered NZR service on 2 January 1932 as A 1764 as a wooden cladded carriage. Converted to Steel Clad on 20 July 1963 and reclassified as A^{L} 1764 on 11 October in the same year. It was the renumbered as AL 50090 in 1978. Withdrawn from service on 13 August 1983 and purchased by the Otago Excursion Train Trust. It was then reclassified as XPC 481. Withdrawn in September 2009 by the Taieri Gorge Railway. Purchased by the MRHT and is currently in storage awaiting restoration.

=== Wagons ===
Key:	In service	In service, Mainline Certified	Under overhaul/restoration	Stored	Static display	Scrapped

Number	Builder	Year built	Arrived in Springfield	Notes
Yc 821 (TMS: YC 1532)	NZR East Town Workshops	1963	2007	Entered NZR service in November 1963. Renumbered as YC 1532 in 1978. Withdrawn from service in 2007 and purchased by the MRHT and is currently in storage awaiting restoration.
Yf 912 (TMS: YF 161)	NZR Addington Workshops	1964		
Ks 4825 (TMS: KS 15215)	NZR East Town Workshops	1970		
