= NZR UA class =

NZR U^{A} class
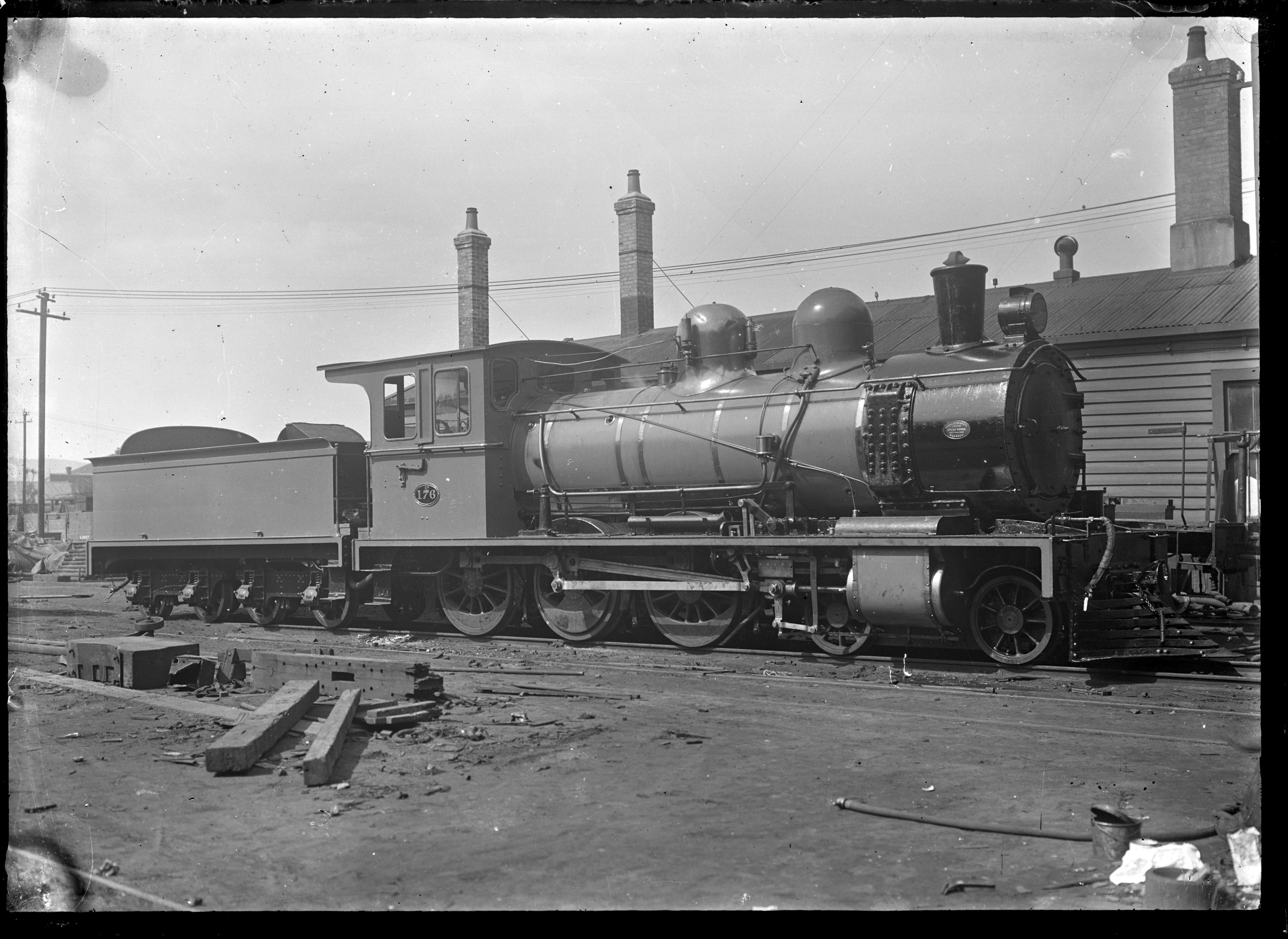
- U^{A} class 4-6-0 steam locomotive NZR number 176
Type and origin
- Power type: Steam
- Builder: Sharp Stewart and Company, Glasgow
- Build date: 1899
- Total produced: 6
Specifications
- Configuration
  - Whyte: 4-6-0
- Gauge: 3 ft 6 in (1,067 mm)
- Driver dia.: 49.125 in (1.248 m)
- Length: 49 ft 3 in (15.01 m)
- Loco weight: 38.2 long tons (38.8 tonnes; 42.8 short tons)
- Tender weight: 24 long tons (24.4 tonnes; 26.9 short tons)
- Total weight: 62.2 long tons (63.2 tonnes; 69.7 short tons)
- Fuel type: Coal
- Fuel capacity: 4.0 long tons (4.1 tonnes; 4.5 short tons)
- Water cap.: 1,700 imp gal (7,700 L; 2,000 US gal)
- Firebox
  - Grate area: 16 sq ft (1.5 m^{2})
- Boiler pressure: 175 lbf/in^{2} (1,207 kPa)
- Heating surface
  - Tubes: 972 sq ft (90.3 m^{2})
- Cylinders: Two, outside
- Cylinder size: 16 in × 20 in (406 mm × 508 mm)
Performance figures
- Maximum speed: 50 mph (80 km/h)
- Tractive effort: 14,591 lbf (64.90 kN)
Career
- Operators: NZR
- Numbers: 172-177
- Locale: Otago, Southland
- Withdrawn: 1933-1936
- Disposition: Withdrawn, Scrapped
- Classified U until 1902

The NZR U^{A} class were a class of 4-6-0 Ten Wheeler locomotive built by the Scottish firm of Sharp Stewart and Company to ease a motive power shortage. They lived relatively short lives amongst NZR ten wheelers, mostly at the southern end of the country where they were seldom photographed.

== Origin and design ==
As New Zealand rapidly recovered from the 1880s depression, NZR developed a motive power shortage that its own workshops could not keep up with. After his 1898 annual report indicated it was "absolutely necessary" to obtain more locomotives the Locomotive Superintendent obtained permission to buy sixteen 4-6-0 locomotives, ten from Baldwin, and six from Sharp Stewart and Co. All were delivered in 1899.

Unlike the Addington U class the new locomotives were of uniform appearance, with low mounted running boards and splashers over the drivers. The design was based on and very similar to the U class, differing primarily in the provision of smaller driving wheels delivering higher tractive effort. Although they used the same type of boiler they carried a higher pressure and were fitted with piston valves. Overall their appearance was similar to their predecessors.

== Service ==
Initially three each were stationed at Invercargill and Dunedin to run express passenger services between those cities. Later the Dunedin-based engines joined their siblings in the south. The only known report from footplate men indicated that while finely built they were difficult to fire. However annual returns indicate that they ran greater annual miles and at lower cost than other 4-6-0's at the time.

Modifications included lengthening the smokebox, a common procedure on many early NZR types, and sand domes were provided, while the running boards were raised. In the 1920s either two or three (sources vary) received superheated boilers of 200 lb sq in working pressure. However, the class was gone before the end of the 1930s, the superheated boilers going to members of the U^{C} class of the same maker. One was reportedly dumped on the Oamaru foreshore.

== See also ==
- NZR U class
- NZR U^{B} class
- NZR U^{C} class
- NZR U^{D} class
- Locomotives of New Zealand
