= NZR UC class =

Class of New Zealand steam locomotives

NZR U^{C} class
- UC Class 368 after NZR modifications in about 1920
Type and origin
- Builder: Sharp, Stewart and Company
- Build date: 1901
- Total produced: 10
Specifications
- Configuration
  - Whyte: 4-6-0
- Gauge: 3 ft 6 in (1,067 mm)
- Driver dia.: 49.125 in (1.248 m)
- Adhesive weight: 26.8 long tons (27.2 tonnes; 30.0 short tons)
- Total weight: 62.6 long tons (63.6 tonnes; 70.1 short tons)
- Fuel type: Coal
- Firebox
  - Grate area: 17 sq ft (1.6 m^{2})
- Boiler pressure: 200 lbf/in^{2} (1,379 kPa)
- Heating surface: 975 sq ft (90.6 m^{2})
- Cylinders: Two, outside
- Cylinder size: 16 in × 22 in (406 mm × 559 mm)
Performance figures
- Tractive effort: 18,340 lbf (81.58 kN)
Career
- Operators: NZR

The NZR U^{C} class were a group of ten 4-6-0 steam locomotives obtained from Scottish builders Sharp, Stewart and Company for New Zealand Railways (NZR). Essentially they were developments of the firm's previous batch of 4-6-0s' for NZR.

== Origin and design ==
Due to an increase in traffic around the turn of the century, NZR obtained 47 4-6-0 locomotives to provide additional capacity. All were used in the South Island. The U^{C} class were the last new 4-6-0's to be delivered, entering service between August and October 1901. They were briefly classified "U". Externally they were similar in appearance to Sharp Stewart's earlier U^{A} class, but with a longer cylinder stroke and considerably higher boiler pressure (200 psi as opposed to 175 psi) they had a significantly higher tractive effort. All of the locomotives began service in the Christchurch area aside from two allocated to the Dunedin - Invercargill section.

== Service ==
With the opening of the Otira Tunnel in 1923 all ten were gradually transferred to the West Coast of the South Island. Due to weight restrictions they were the most powerful mainline locomotives on the West Coast until the 1940s. In the late 1920s and 1930s seven locomotives were fitted with narrow firebox superheated boilers and lever type reverse controls in place of the original wheel and screw type. Other alterations included fitting sand domes and a new type of funnel. The remaining three locomotives were withdrawn by 1937.

The superheated boilers on the U^{C}s provided better performance and from the mid 1930s they saw considerably greater use than the Baldwin built U^{B} class locomotives. They were still being used on passenger services as well as coal trains in the mid 1950s, however the arrival of more A Class locomotives in the 1950s (displaced by dieselisation in the North Island) allowed their withdrawal by 1959. Although none were initially preserved a number were dumped in rivers as erosion prevention measures, and two have been recovered for potential restoration.

== Preservation ==
In March 2005, the newly formed Midland Rail Heritage Trust in conjunction with a family of private individuals salvaged the remains of U^{C} 369 and U^{C} 370 from the Grey River. The locomotives had fallen into the Grey River in 1997-98 during a period of bad weather; both were recovered with the remains of their tenders and are currently stored at the MRHT's Springfield depot pending completion of a workshop to restore them in.

In 2008, the remains of U^{C} 366 were recovered by then network operator ONTRACK during an exercise to remove as many of the locomotive remains dumped at Oamaru which were at risk of being lost due to deterioration of the dumpsite. The badly deteriorated remains of the U^{C} were passed to the Oamaru Steam and Rail Restoration Society, who have placed it on display at their workshops along with another selection of salvaged locomotive parts.

== See also ==
- NZR U class
- NZR U^{A} class
- NZR U^{B} class
- NZR U^{D} class
- Locomotives of New Zealand
