= NZR UB class =

NZR U^{B} class
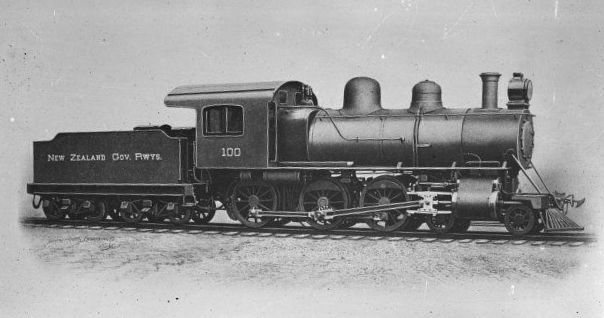
- U^{B} class in the United States, prior to being delivered to New Zealand. The locomotive was renumbered no. 371 by NZR. A P Godber Collection, Alexander Turnbull Library
Type and origin
- Power type: Steam
- Builder: Baldwin Locomotive Works (20), Brooks Locomotive Works (1), Richmond Locomotive Works (1)
- Build date: 1898, 1901
- Total produced: 22
Specifications
- Configuration
  - Whyte: 4-6-0
- Gauge: 3 ft 6 in (1,067 mm)
- Driver dia.: 49.125 in (1.248 m)
- Adhesive weight: 26.4 long tons (26.8 tonnes; 29.6 short tons)
- Total weight: 57.8 long tons (58.7 tonnes; 64.7 short tons)
- Fuel type: Coal
- Firebox
  - Grate area: 16 sq ft (1.5 m^{2})
- Boiler pressure: 175 lbf/in^{2} (1,207 kPa) (1898); 200 psi (1,379 kPa) (1901)
- Heating surface: 1,324 sq ft (123.0 m^{2})
- Cylinders: Two, outside
- Cylinder size: 16 in × 20 in (406 mm × 508 mm)
Performance figures
- Tractive effort: 14,590 lbf (64.90 kN) (1898); 16,670 lbf (74.15 kN) (1901)
Career
- Operators: NZR
- Disposition: Withdrawn

The NZR U^{B} class were a series of Ten Wheelers built by American manufacturers for New Zealand Railways (NZR) around the start of the twentieth century. Two batches were built by Baldwin in 1898 and 1901 (ten each). The earlier batch of engines had slide valves and inside Stephenson motion, the later had piston valves and Walschaerts valve gear, as well as a higher boiler pressure.

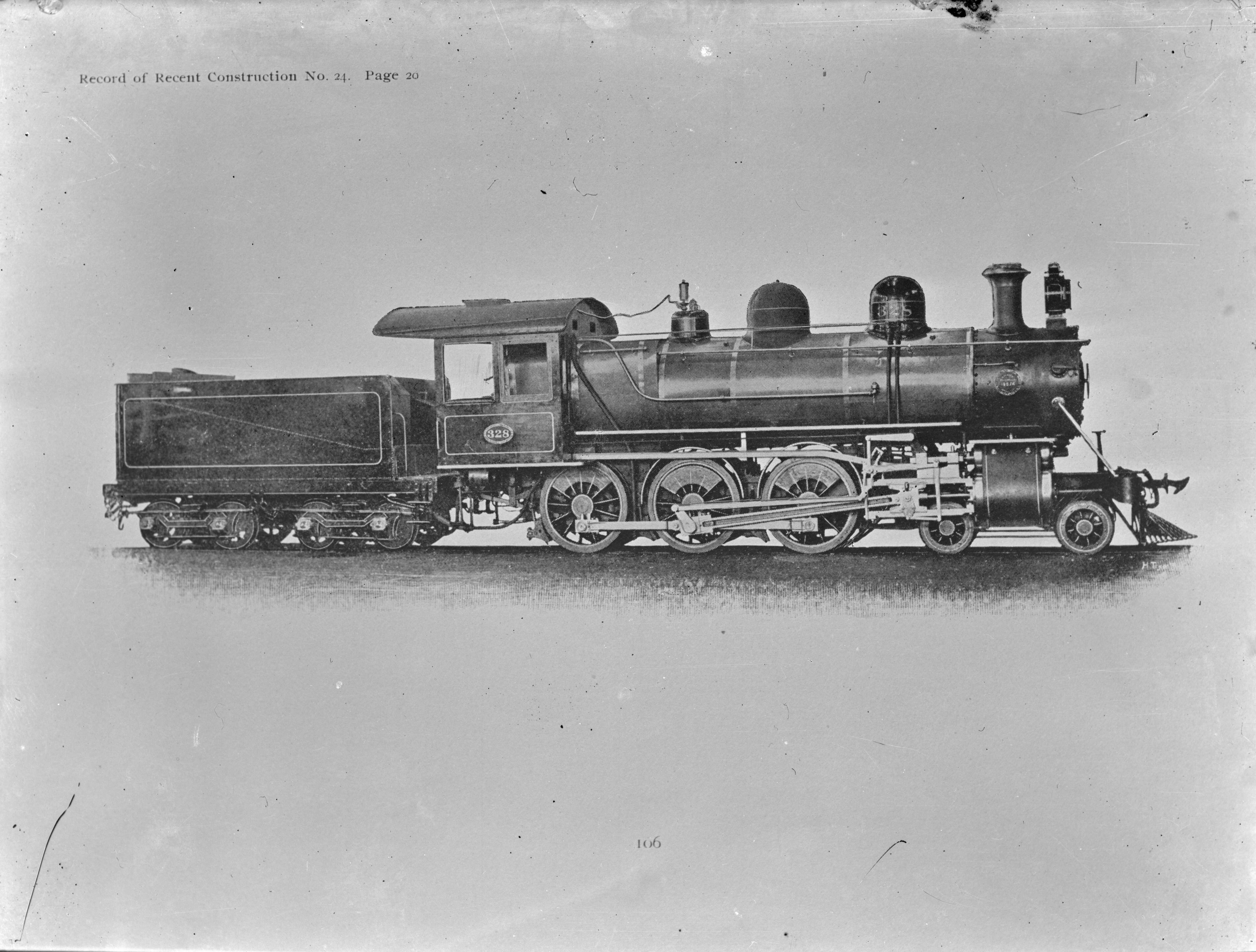
Baldwin-built Ub class 328

== Alco engines ==
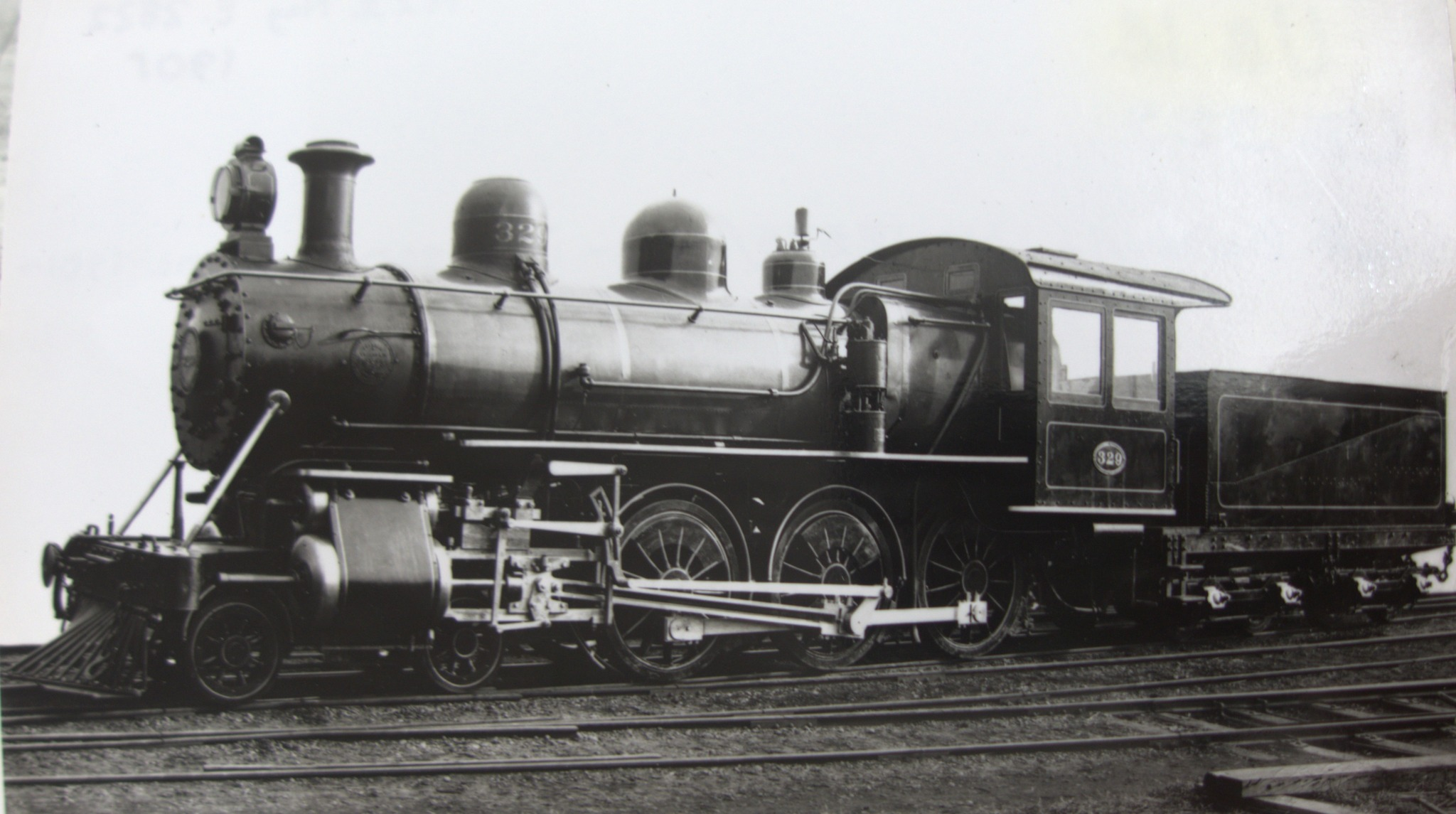
Baldwin NZR Ub class 329

Two additional locomotives were obtained in 1901 from ALCO, one each from Brooks and Richmond.

- The Brooks locomotive (#17) was heavier (30.1 long tons adhesive weight) with attendant increase in tractive effort (18340 lbf), and had a larger grate (17 sq ft). This locomotive was very popular with crews. This locomotive was dumped on the Oamaru foreshore.
- The Richmond locomotive had less evaporative heating surface but included a superheater. Boiler pressure was lower (180 psi) and tractive effort was marginally lower.

The locomotives were initially assigned to Dunedin to Christchurch expresses and were reassigned as newer power replaced them. The last assignment for the class was on the West Coast Region.

== See also ==
- NZR U class
- NZR U^{A} class
- NZR U^{C} class
- NZR U^{D} class
- Locomotives of New Zealand
