= Railway archaeology =

Study of rail transportation relics

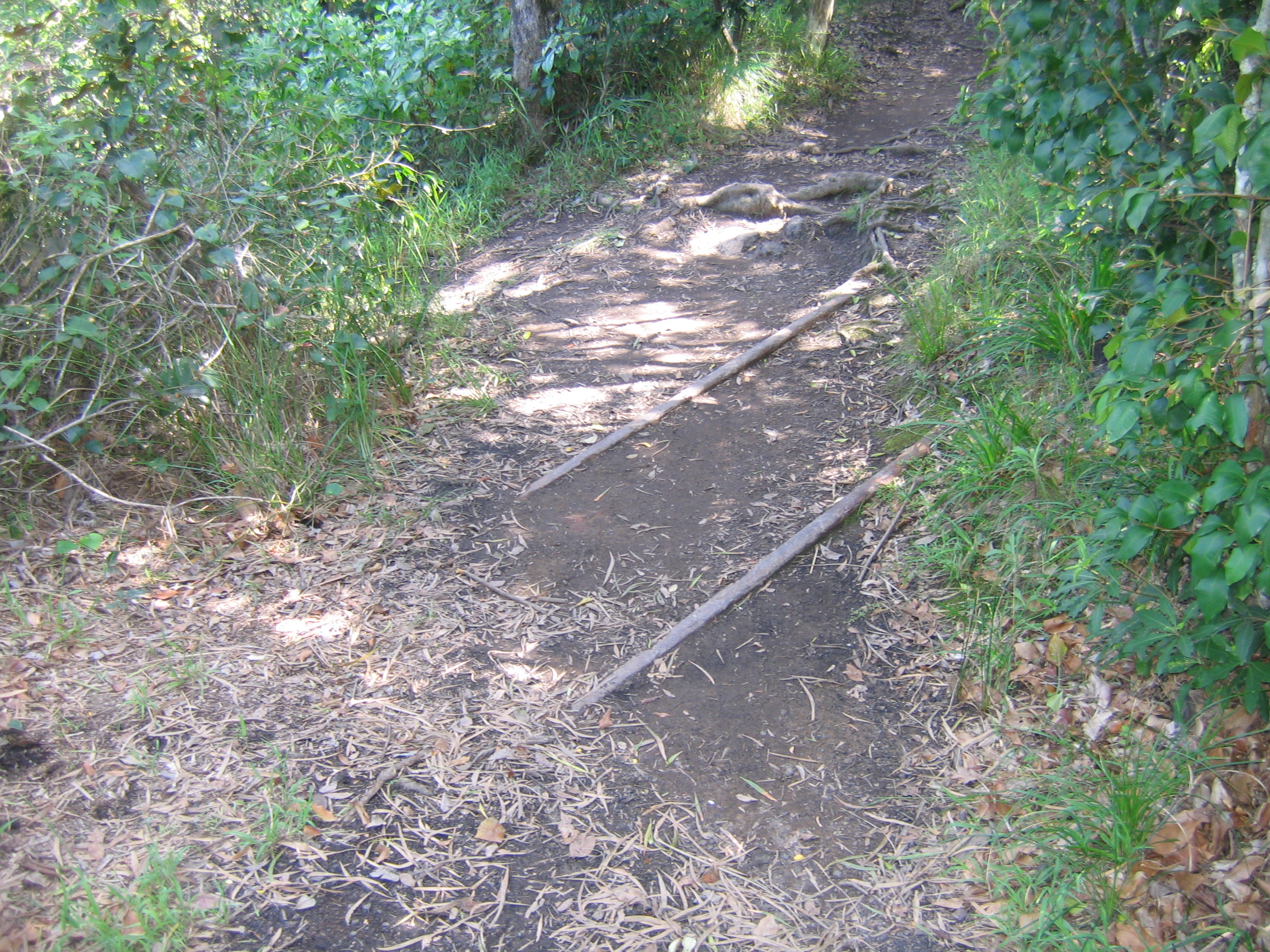
An example of an abandoned railway line

Railway archaeology is the study and enjoyment of relics from past eras of rail transportation (including railways and tramways of all gauges and sizes). The aim of railway archaeology is to learn about the history and see images of the previous appearance of a defunct rail system that became redundant or abandoned and to enjoy searching out these remains and exploring them.

Railway archaeology comes under the general ambit of the study of the industrial past and therefore is a sub-set of Industrial archaeology.

== Societies undertaking railway archaeology ==
The Railway Archaeological Society, a UK-based group that seems to be defunct.

The Light Railway Research Society of Australia is an Australian-based society that was formed in 1961 to promote interest in special-purpose railways. Much of its members' work would fall into the category of railway archaeology.

== Discoveries ==
=== London Bridge Station ===
Archaeologists have discovered hundreds of artefacts at an excavation site under the London Bridge Station. Excavation pits were dug 6 metres (20 ft) deep revealing many artefacts from Roman times. Timber piles that were recorded to be from 59 to 83 AD were used for buildings during the first London Bridge, as well as Medieval floors. Archaeologists continue excavating the site for more artifacts around the 16th and 18th centuries.

=== Victorian era ===
Archaeologists in London have discovered a railway infrastructure near the London tube station created by Isambard Kingdom Brunel, an engineer that is well known for his development of the broad-gauge Great Western Railway from 1833 to 1841. The area has evidence of seven foot-wide broad gauge train tracks and buildings from the 1850s. Archaeologists continue researching the site with laser scanning technology for more artefacts of the Victorian era railway. They are also using a series of 3D models of the architecture of the 1850s buildings in order to identify paths of the railway.

=== Derbyshire ===
In May 2013, a group of archaeologists have discovered what is believed as the oldest railway tunnel at Derbyshire, England. The tunnel lies on the route of the Butterley Gangroad, a horse-operated railway built by 1793 to link the Cromford Canal with the limestone quarries at Crich. The line closed in 1933 after being open for over 100 years and the tunnel was sealed up 50 years later in the 1980s. Trevor Griffin, who is project managing the work for the Derbyshire Archaeological Society, said he thought the tunnel could be older than the one regarded as the world's first – which is also in Derbyshire. He said: "The tunnel that was currently generally considered to be the world's oldest was on the Peak Forest Tramway and was built in 1795." The two-year project began in January. The society worked with Wessex Archaeology to reopen the tunnel and made a three-dimensional computer model of the interior using laser scanning. Written evidence suggested the railway was operating by 1793 and Mr Griffin says they were able to prove the line must have run through the tunnel. The Butterley Gangroad, which was engineered by Benjamin Outram, was modernised in the 1840s and turned into a narrow-gauge railway. When the work is completed, the tunnel will be sealed up for further preservation.

== See also ==
- Omoto locomotive dump

== Bibliography ==
- Nock, O.S (1981). Railway Archaeology, Book Club Associates/Patrick Stephens Ltd.
