= Springfield, New Zealand =

Settlement in Canterbury, New Zealand

Springfield Tawera (Māori)
- Village
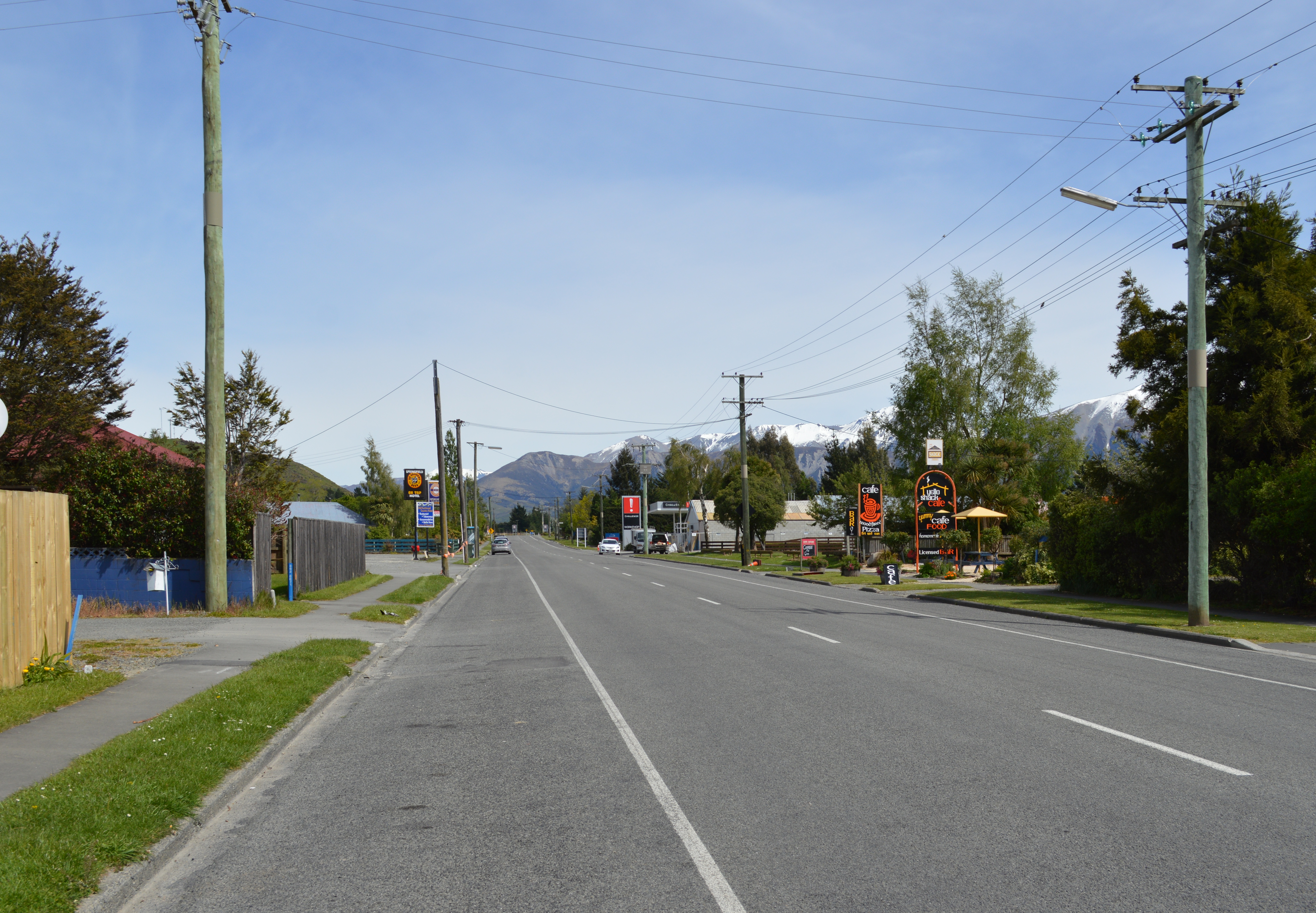
- State Highway 73 passing through Springfield, with the Southern Alps beyond
- Interactive map of Springfield
- Coordinates: 43°20′07″S 171°55′39″E
- Country: New Zealand
- Region: Canterbury
- Territorial authority: Selwyn District
- Ward: Malvern
- Community: Malvern
- Electorates: Selwyn; Te Tai Tonga (Māori)

Government
  - Territorial authority: Selwyn District Council
  - Regional council: Environment Canterbury
  - Mayor of Selwyn: Lydia Gliddon
  - Selwyn MP: Nicola Grigg
  - Te Tai Tonga MP: Mananui Ramsden

Area
  - Total: 1.89 km^{2} (0.73 sq mi)

Population (June 2025)
  - Total: 330
  - Density: 170/km^{2} (450/sq mi)
- Time zone: UTC+12 (NZST)
  - Summer (DST): UTC+13 (NZDT)
- Postcode: 7681
- Area code: 03
- Local iwi: Ngāi Tahu

Springfield (Māori: Tawera), called Kowai Pass until 1880, is a small town in the Selwyn District of Canterbury, in the South Island, of New Zealand. Springfield is situated in the foothills of the Southern Alps as the most westerly town of the Canterbury Plains. Springfield is 65 kilometres (40 mi) west of Christchurch on State Highway 73 (The Great Alpine Highway), 9.7 kilometres (6.0 mi) northwest of Sheffield and 22.7 kilometres (14.1 mi) from Darfield. It is located close to Porters Ski Area, Mount Cheeseman, Broken River, Temple Basin and Craigieburn ski fields. Springfield has a long association with the Midland railway line.

== History ==
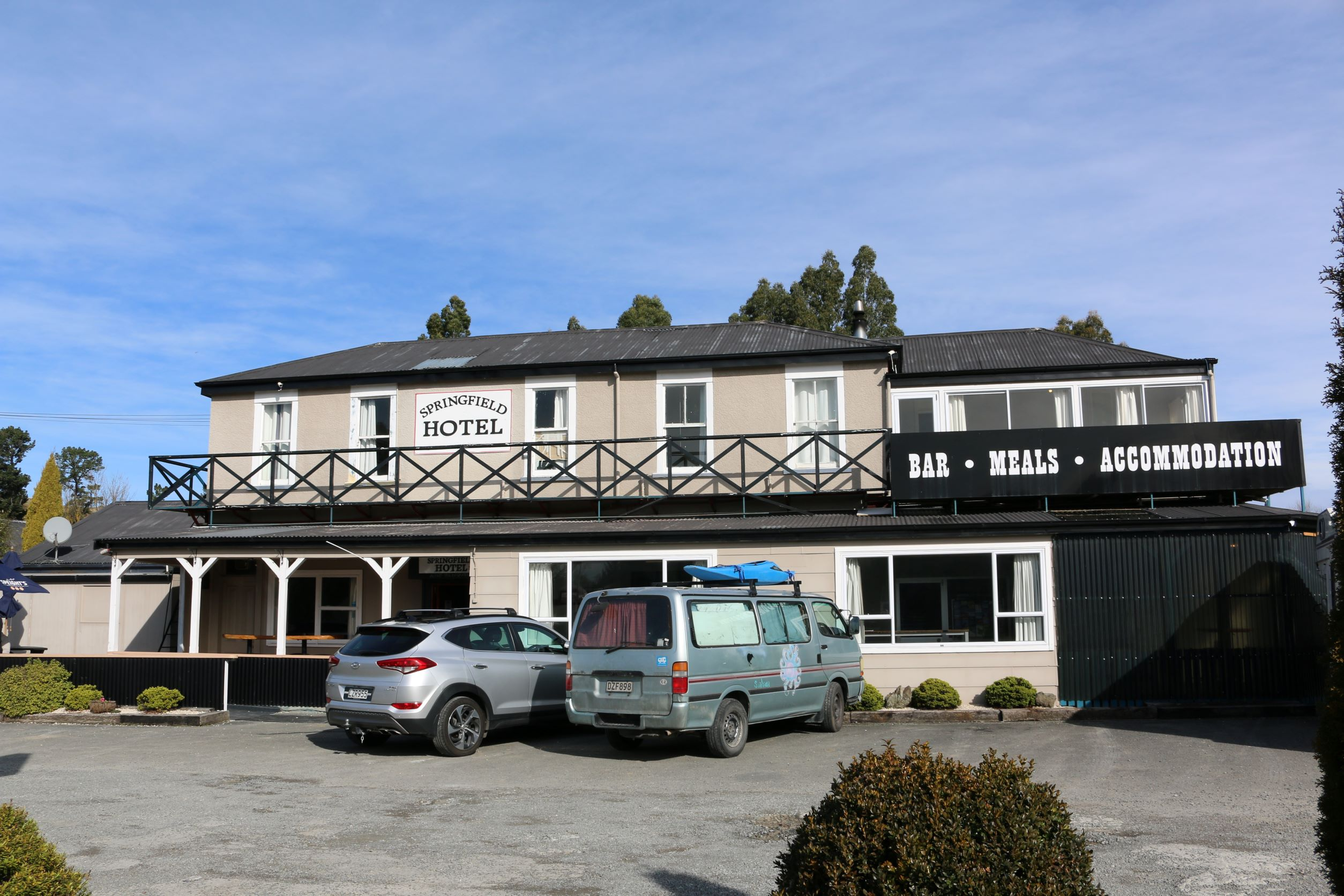
Springfield Hotel (2021)

The development of the town started around 1860. With the discovery of gold on the West Coast, Springfield saw more traffic. The Springfield Hotel was first built in 1862. Rooms were added to it on a number of occasions enlarging the hotel so that it had 40 rooms. The hotel was an important coaching stop on the route to the west coast.

In the 1870s, water from the nearby Kowai River was used to develop one of the earliest stock water races in Canterbury.

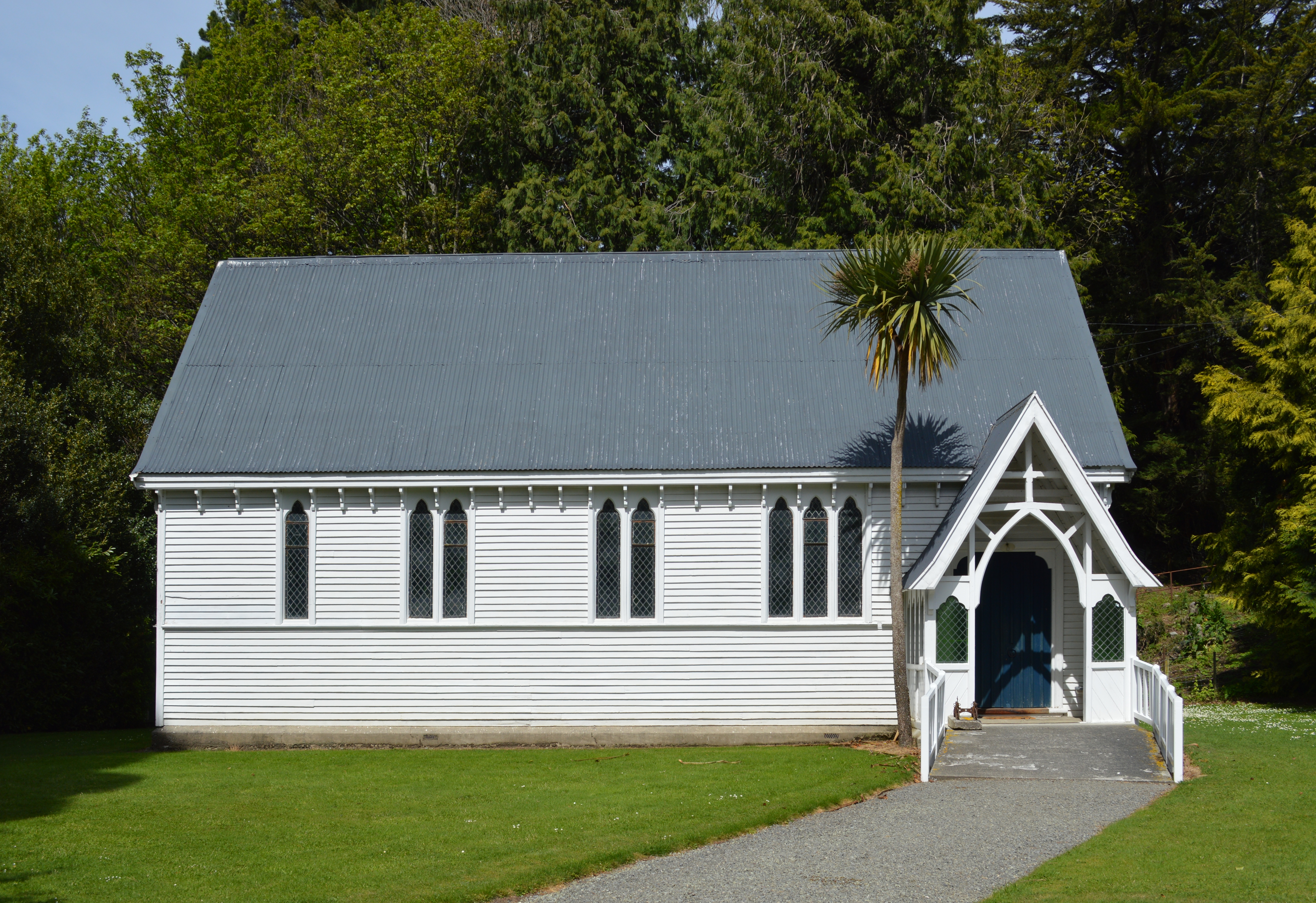
St Peter's Church

The town has a Gothic Revival architecture church dedicated to Saint Peter, designed by the architect Cyril Mountfort. It was the birthplace of Rewi Alley, notable for his work in China in the mid 20th century. There is an extensive memorial dedicated to him, located in a small reserve off the main road. It includes a large stone carving and a number of panels giving details of his life.

On 15 July 2007, a statue of a giant pink doughnut was erected to promote the upcoming movie, The Simpsons Movie. It was subsequently set alight and destroyed by an arsonist on 25 September 2009. A tyre painted pink was used as a substitute until it was replaced with a concrete version unveiled on 1 July 2012.

In 2016, the start of a new subdivision called Alpine View Estate began. A new road, called Princes Street was built next to Queen and King St with a link to Victoria St.

In 2019, the town gained unwanted attention in the national and international media when the Springfield Store and Café was dubbed the rudest café in New Zealand and the police visited offering customer service advice. It is now under new ownership.

On 29 May 2021, most of the township of Springfield was evacuated due to flooding from continuous heavy rain. Bishops Gully, in the centre of the town overflowed as well as the water race. A number of properties were flooded.

=== Midland Line ===
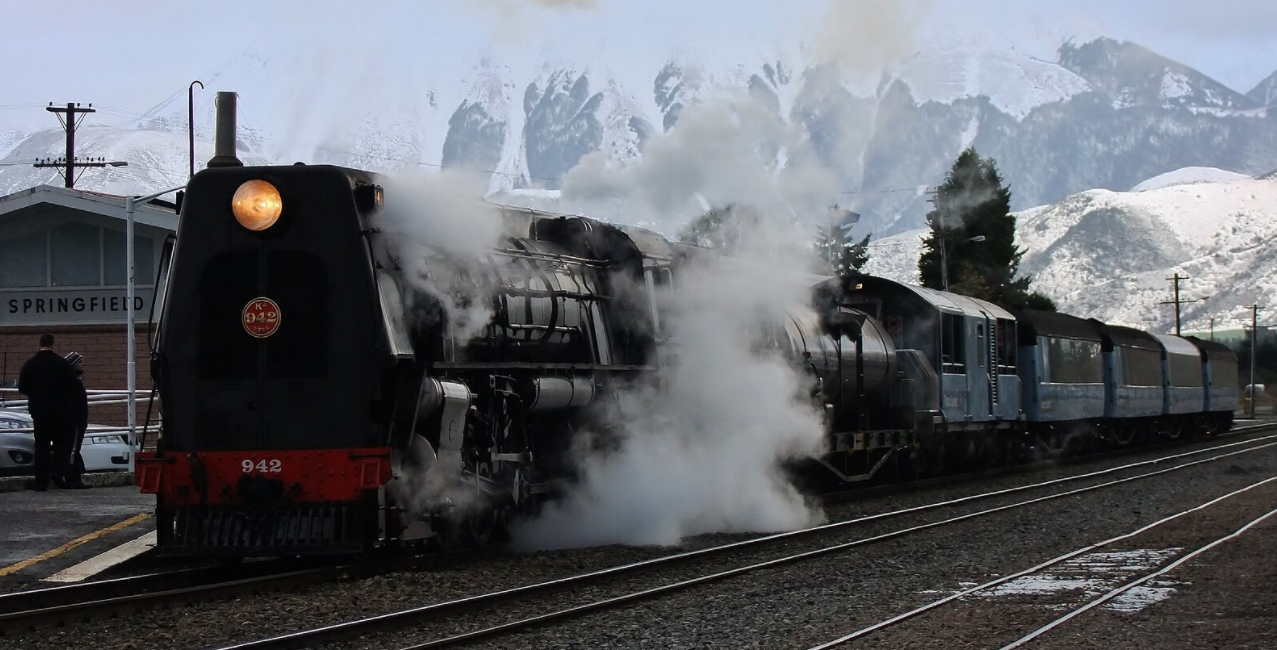
A Mainline Steam KA Class Locomotive at Springfield Railway Station for the 2013 Midland Mountaineer, with the Torlesse Mountain range in the background.

Springfield is a significant stop on the TranzAlpine train journey across the Southern Alps on the Midland Line. The town is also home to the Midland Rail Heritage Trust a rail preservation group that has established a base in the former NZR locomotive depot opposite the railway station. The Springfield Hotel was a stop on the road west from Christchurch for horse-drawn coaches. When trains became the usual way to travel between Canterbury and the West Coast, the train station refreshment rooms were a popular stop.

As of 2021, the Mainline Steam Heritage Trust's Christchurch depot will be moving to the Midland Rail Heritage Trust's land and will build a new depot from there.

==== History of the railway station ====
Springfield railway station
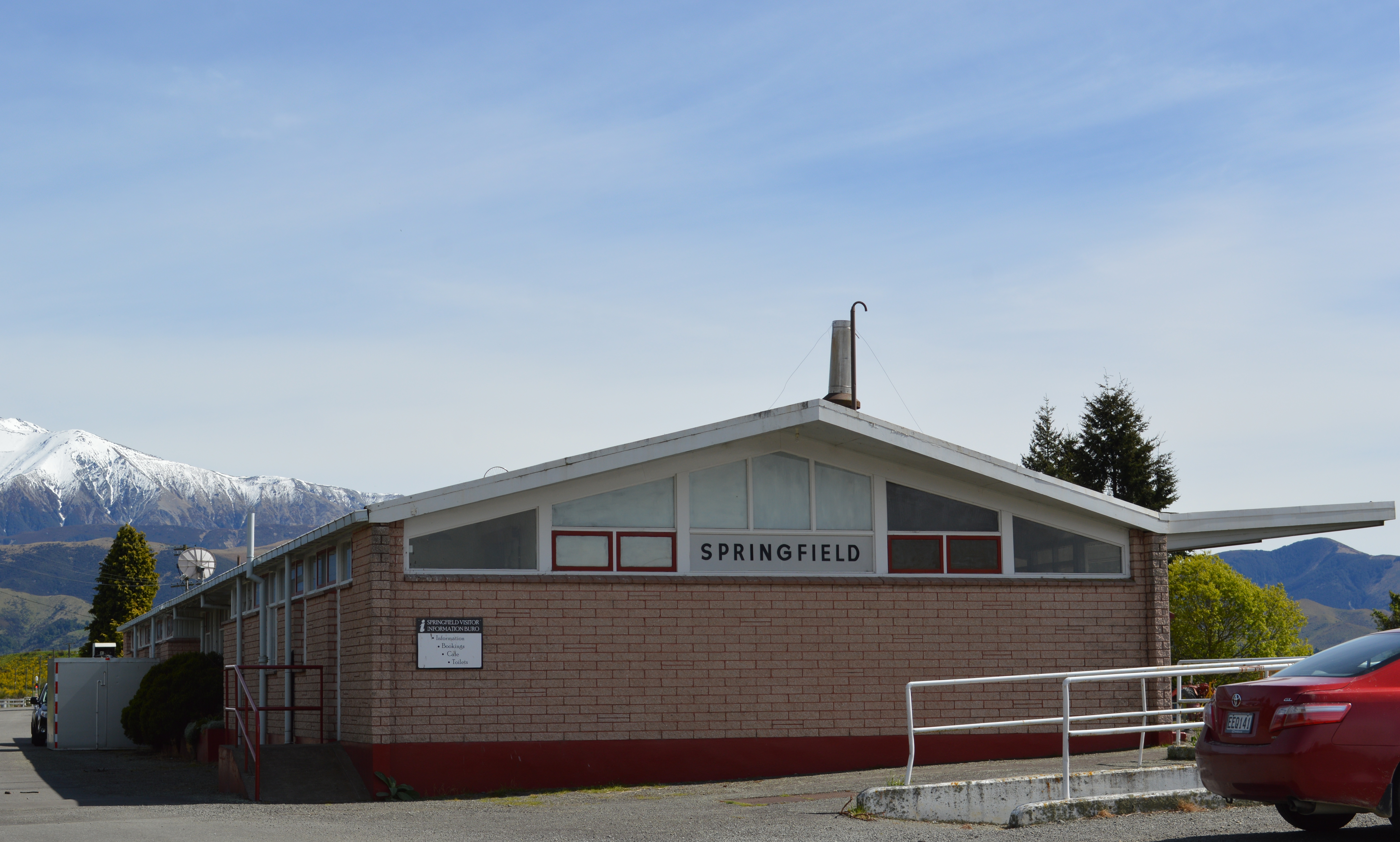
- Railway station in 2013

General information
- Elevation: 383 ft (117 m)
- Owner: KiwiRail
- Distance: Christchurch 80.53 km (50.04 mi)

History
- Opened: 5 January 1880
- Closed: 3 November 1986 to goods
- Rebuilt: 1965

Services
Preceding station	Historical railways	Following station
Annat; Line open, station closed 6.34 km (3.94 mi) towards Christchurch	Main North Line; KiwiRail	Kowai Bush; Line open, station closed 5.13 km (3.19 mi) towards Picton
Location

The 6 mi 45 ch (10.6 km) Sheffield-Springfield section of the railway was built by F Benham for £10,353 and opened on 5 January 1880, with morning and evening trains. By 1882 there was a 4th class station, a platform, cart approach, 60 ft (18 m) x 30 ft (9.1 m) goods shed, loading bank, crane, water, coal, weighbridge, engine shed, stationmaster's house, urinals and a passing loop for 23 wagons. On 25 July 1880 a Post Office opened and remained until 17 April 1946, when it was moved from the station. Springfield Coal Company dug about 100 tons of coal a day and produced earthenware, from the 1870s to 1890s, until a flood closed the mine. Their siding was closed in 1911. Springfield ceased being the terminus of the line, when the Otarama section opened on 26 December 1892. Stockyards were added in 1900 and a turntable in 1903. In 1931 the station had 6 staff; a stationmaster, 3 clerks, a permanent way inspector and a cadet. The refreshment rooms were remodelled in 1941, but destroyed in a fire on 1 April 1963. The station was rebuilt by Jeel & Skurr Ltd, Oxford and the 140 ft (43 m) x 34 ft (10 m) Summerhill stone (cement and clay blocks made at Hornby from the 1950s) building opened on 15 June 1965. The engine shed closed on 28 March 1987 and a reversing triangle was provided from 1988 to 1991.

== Demographics ==
Springfield is described by Stats NZ as a rural settlement, and covers 1.89 km^{2} (0.73 sq mi). It had an estimated population of 330 as of June 2025, with a population density of 175 people per km^{2}. It is part of the statistical area of Torlesse.

Historical population for Springfield
Year	Pop.	±% p.a.
2006	213	—
2013	234	+1.35%
2018	315	+6.13%
2023	324	+0.57%

Springfield had a population of 324 in the 2023 New Zealand census, an increase of 9 people (2.9%) since the 2018 census, and an increase of 90 people (38.5%) since the 2013 census. There were 174 males and 147 females in 141 dwellings. 2.8% of people identified as LGBTIQ+. The median age was 43.9 years (compared with 38.1 years nationally). There were 57 people (17.6%) aged under 15 years, 27 (8.3%) aged 15 to 29, 174 (53.7%) aged 30 to 64, and 66 (20.4%) aged 65 or older.

People could identify as more than one ethnicity. The results were 89.8% European (Pākehā), 13.0% Māori, 2.8% Pasifika, 0.9% Asian, and 6.5% other, which includes people giving their ethnicity as "New Zealander". English was spoken by 99.1%, Māori by 0.9%, Samoan by 0.9%, and other languages by 4.6%. No language could be spoken by 0.9% (e.g. too young to talk). New Zealand Sign Language was known by 0.9%. The percentage of people born overseas was 20.4, compared with 28.8% nationally.

Religious affiliations were 26.9% Christian, and 1.9% other religions. People who answered that they had no religion were 65.7%, and 4.6% of people did not answer the census question.

Of those at least 15 years old, 33 (12.4%) people had a bachelor's or higher degree, 156 (58.4%) had a post-high school certificate or diploma, and 66 (24.7%) people exclusively held high school qualifications. The median income was $38,900, compared with $41,500 nationally. 24 people (9.0%) earned over $100,000 compared to 12.1% nationally. The employment status of those at least 15 was 138 (51.7%) full-time, 39 (14.6%) part-time, and 6 (2.2%) unemployed.

=== Torlesse ===
Torlesse statistical area, which also includes Sheffield and Waddington, covers 414.28 km^{2} (159.95 sq mi). It had an estimated population of 1,230 as of June 2025, with a population density of 3.0 people per km^{2}.

Historical population for Torlesse
Year	Pop.	±% p.a.
2006	900	—
2013	1,014	+1.72%
2018	1,164	+2.80%
2023	1,185	+0.36%

Torlesse had a population of 1,185 in the 2023 New Zealand census, an increase of 21 people (1.8%) since the 2018 census, and an increase of 171 people (16.9%) since the 2013 census. There were 618 males, 564 females, and 6 people of other genders in 489 dwellings. 2.3% of people identified as LGBTIQ+. The median age was 44.3 years (compared with 38.1 years nationally). There were 210 people (17.7%) aged under 15 years, 147 (12.4%) aged 15 to 29, 624 (52.7%) aged 30 to 64, and 204 (17.2%) aged 65 or older.

People could identify as more than one ethnicity. The results were 92.2% European (Pākehā); 9.9% Māori; 1.3% Pasifika; 3.0% Asian; 1.0% Middle Eastern, Latin American and African New Zealanders (MELAA); and 4.8% other, which includes people giving their ethnicity as "New Zealander". English was spoken by 98.2%, Māori by 1.3%, Samoan by 0.3%, and other languages by 6.3%. No language could be spoken by 1.5% (e.g. too young to talk). New Zealand Sign Language was known by 0.5%. The percentage of people born overseas was 16.5, compared with 28.8% nationally.

Religious affiliations were 27.8% Christian, 0.5% Hindu, 0.5% New Age, and 1.3% other religions. People who answered that they had no religion were 61.8%, and 8.1% of people did not answer the census question.

Of those at least 15 years old, 186 (19.1%) people had a bachelor's or higher degree, 567 (58.2%) had a post-high school certificate or diploma, and 228 (23.4%) people exclusively held high school qualifications. The median income was $41,600, compared with $41,500 nationally. 87 people (8.9%) earned over $100,000 compared to 12.1% nationally. The employment status of those at least 15 was 543 (55.7%) full-time, 153 (15.7%) part-time, and 18 (1.8%) unemployed.

== Government ==
Springfield is part of the Selwyn electorate. The Selwyn District Council provides local government services for Springfield.

== Education ==
Springfield School is a contributing primary school catering for years 1 to 6. It had a roll of 41 as of July 2026. The school opened in 1872.

== Etymology ==
There are a number of accounts where the name Springfield may have come. It may have been named after an American Civil War battlefield by J Bell in 1868. It might have also been named in a similar style to Darfield and Sheffield and the final suggestion is that the post office was named in 1870 after a spring in the field beside the local hotel.

== Gallery ==
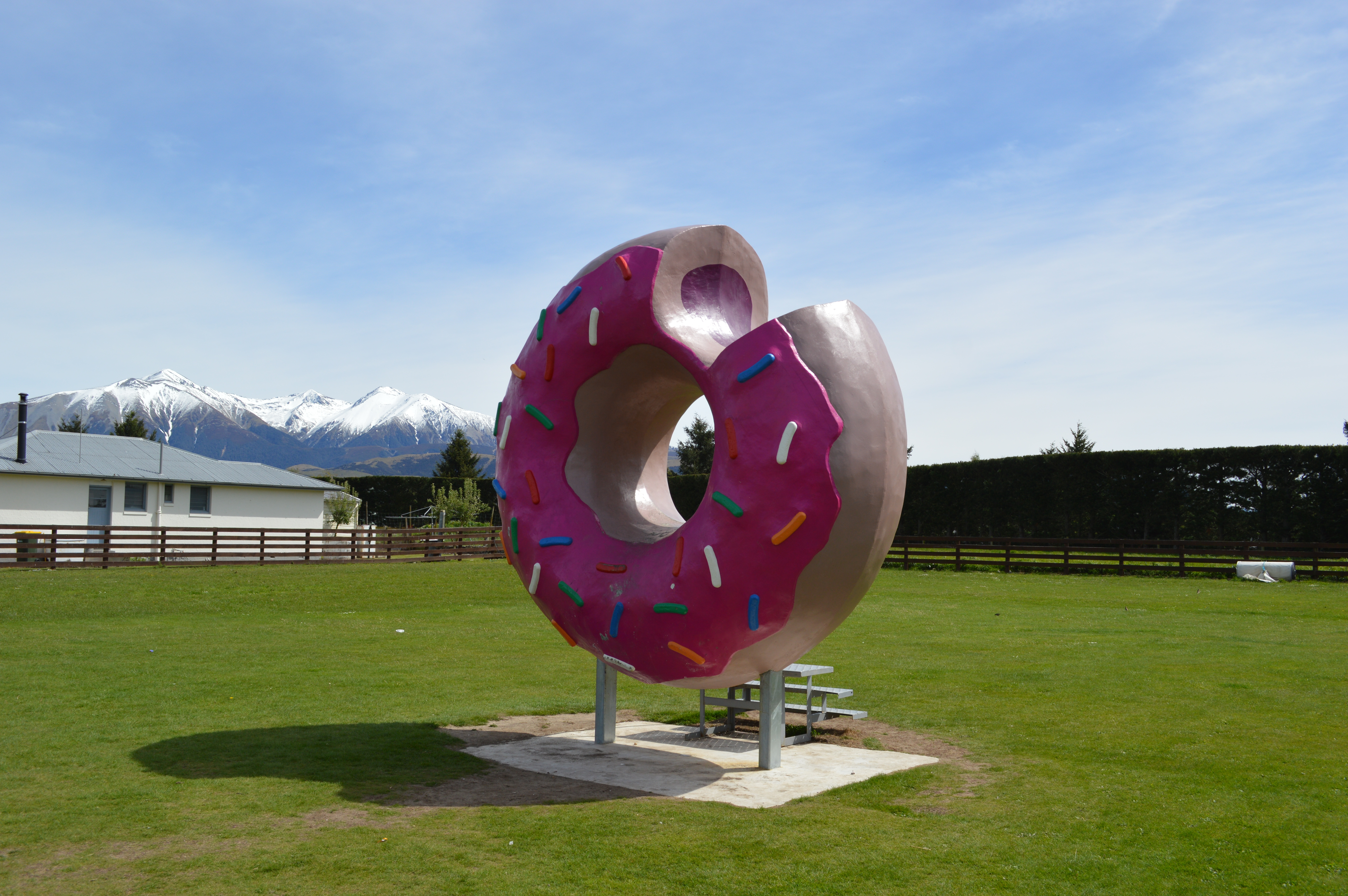
The "Springfield Doughnut"

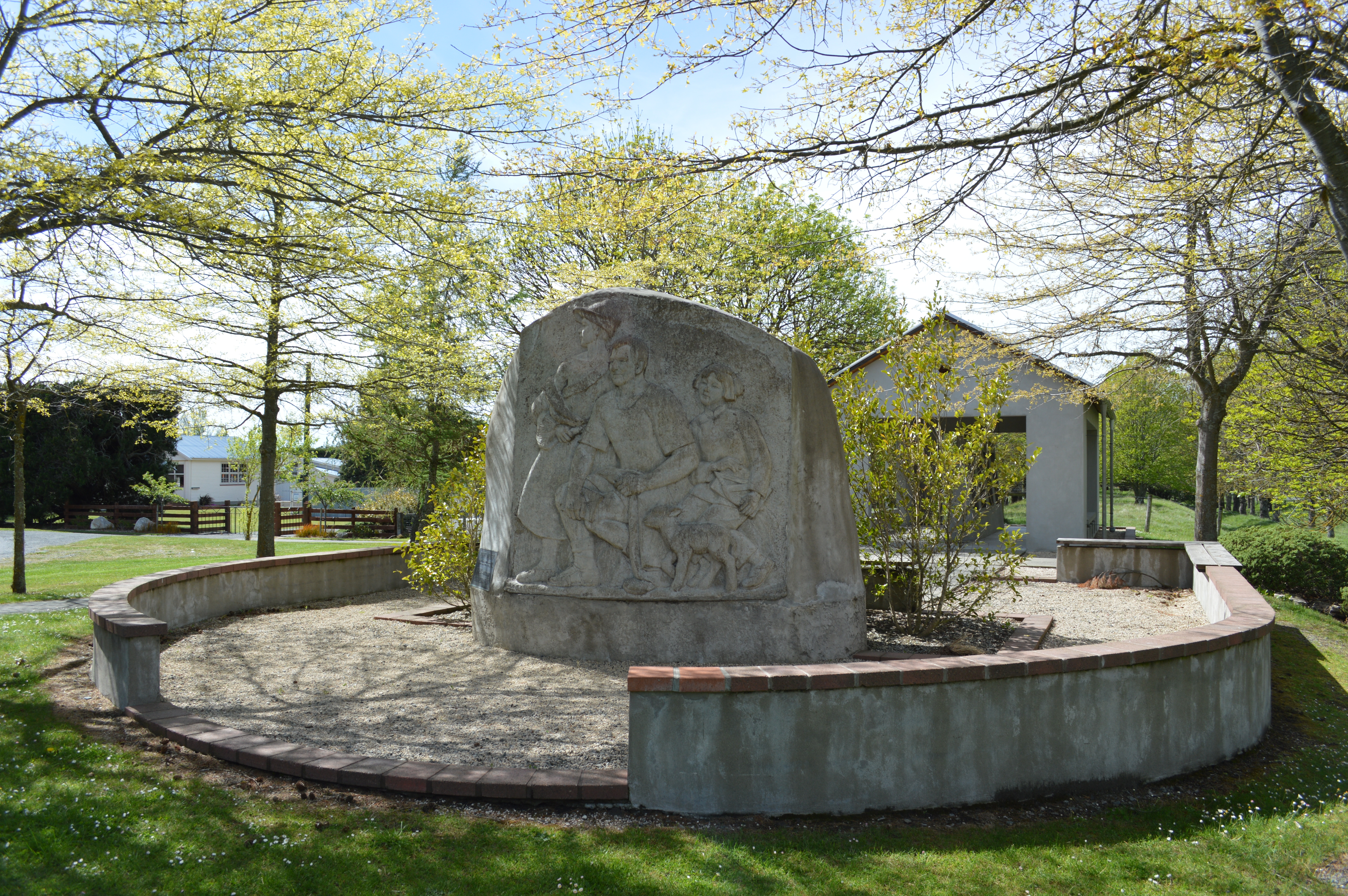
Rewi Alley memorial

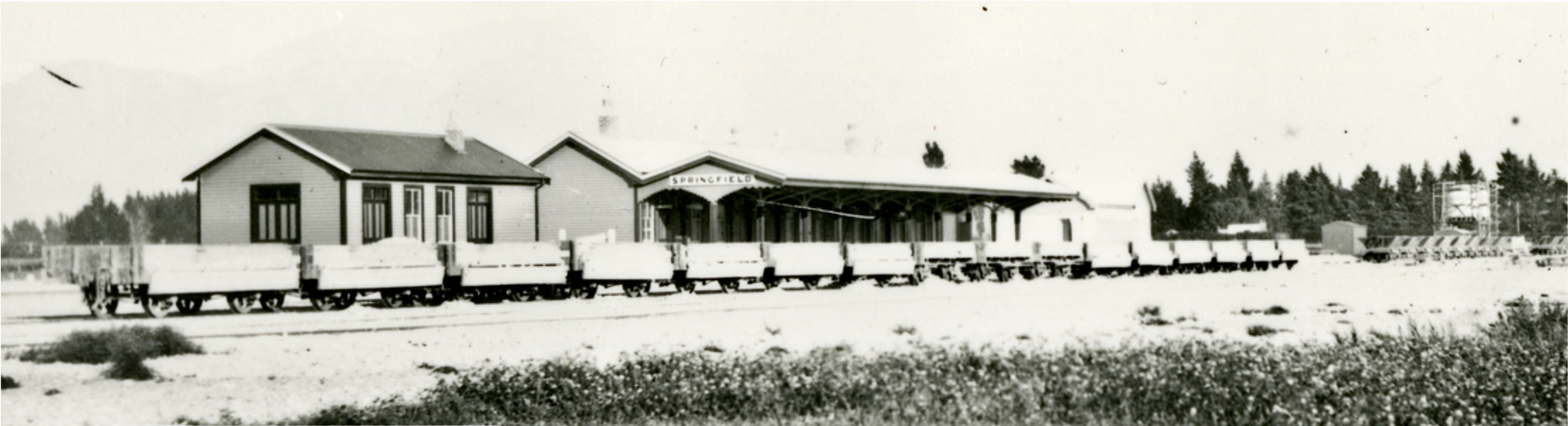
Springfield railway station in 1910s
