= NZR U class =

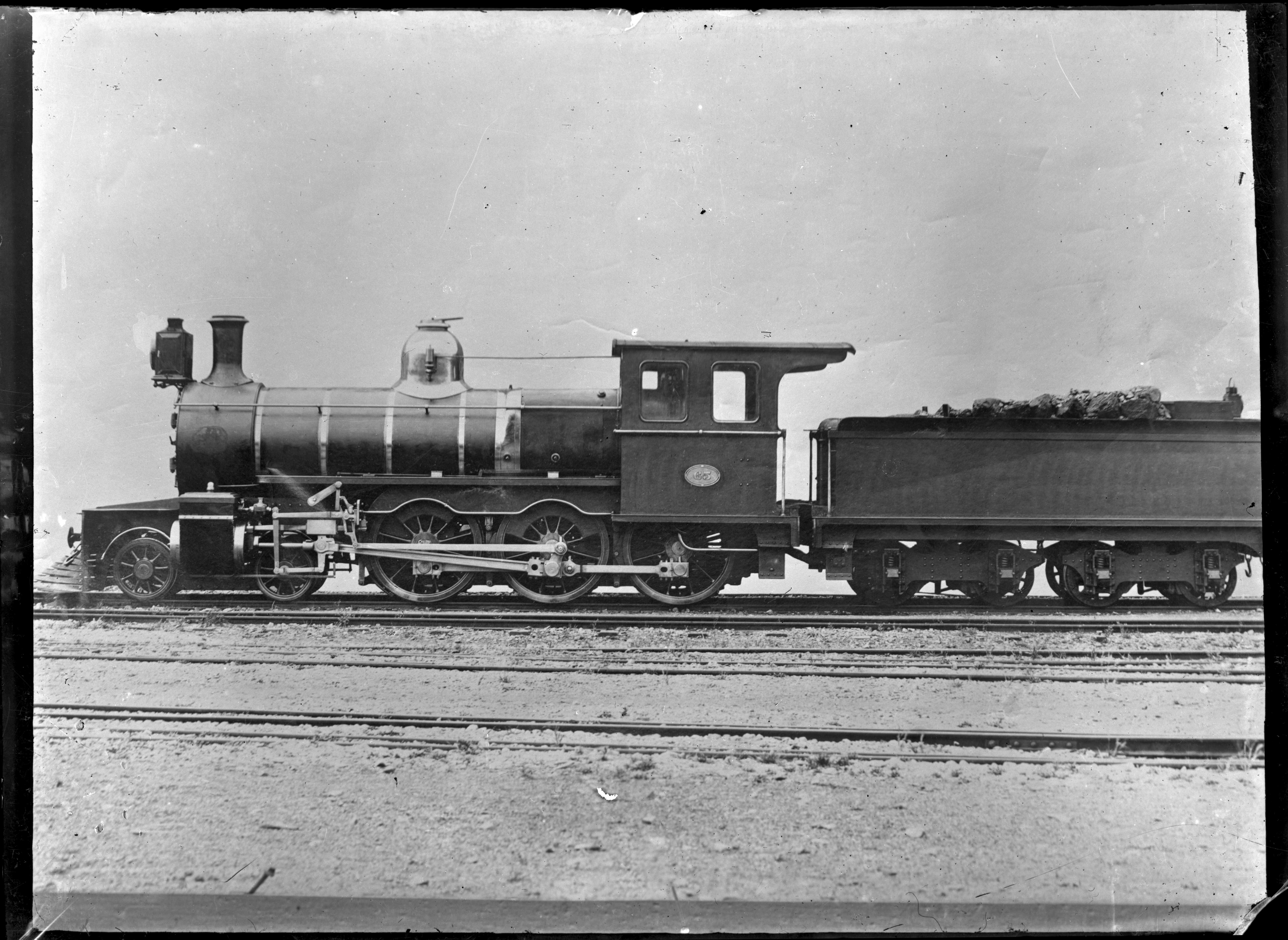
- Steam locomotive 65
Type and origin
- Power type: Steam
- Builder: NZGR Addington Workshops
- Build date: 1894-1903
- Total produced: 9
Specifications
- Configuration
  - Whyte: 4-6-0
- Gauge: 3 ft 6 in (1,067 mm)
- Driver dia.: 54 in (1.372 m)
- Length: 49 ft 11.5 in (15.23 m)
- Loco weight: 38 long tons (38.6 tonnes; 42.6 short tons)
- Tender weight: 25 long tons (25.4 tonnes; 28.0 short tons)
- Total weight: 63 long tons (64.0 tonnes; 70.6 short tons)
- Fuel type: Coal
- Fuel capacity: 3.1 long tons (3.1 tonnes; 3.5 short tons)
- Water cap.: 1,900 imp gal (8,600 L; 2,300 US gal)
- Firebox
  - Grate area: 16 sq ft (1.5 m^{2})
- Boiler pressure: 160 lbf/in^{2} (1,103 kPa)
- Heating surface
  - Tubes: 972 sq ft (90.3 m^{2})
- Cylinders: Two, outside
- Cylinder size: 16 in × 20 in (406 mm × 508 mm)
Performance figures
- Maximum speed: 50 mph (80 km/h)
- Tractive effort: 12,136 lbf (53.98 kN)
Career
- Operators: NZR
- Numbers: 51,65,193,194,215,237,239,274,378
- Locale: Canterbury, Otago, Southland
- Withdrawn: 1954–1959
- Disposition: Withdrawn, Scrapped

The NZR U class, the first tender locomotives built in New Zealand, were a class of 4-6-0 Ten Wheeler locomotive designed to the requirements of Mr T. F. Rotherham and built at NZR Addington between 1894 and 1903. They were amongst NZRs' longest lived tender engines.

== Origin and Design ==
The U class was designed to fill a need to provide more powerful and faster passenger locomotives than the N and V classes then in service. The class were the first express locomotives on the NZR to have Walschaerts valve motion and also introduced the 4' 6" driving wheel which would be considered standard for express passenger work. They did however have flat slide valves and would be the last NZR locomotives so built.

The U's were the first tender locomotives built in New Zealand and were a significant step in the country's industrial capability. However, Addington was not yet set up for mass production and construction was intermittent and drawn out, resulting in changes to the design over the course of building. The first pair had a curved running board that started high near the smokebox and curved over downward over the lead driver. The livery was black edged on the tender and cab with chocolate, and lined with a gold stripe. the boiler bands, steam dome casing and leading edge of the Belpaire firebox were polished brass and the wheels and frames were varnished. The second pair introduced the new standard cab but retained wooden headstocks. The third pair received steel headstocks. The final three were built with boilers of 175psi capacity. The last built, No. 378, had a sand dome and continuous brakes, features soon added to the rest.

== Service and Modifications ==
Although reported to 'curve well and ride easily', and possessed of relatively large driving wheels, they were not a success on the Canterbury plains as intended. According to driver Jack Ewart: "... she [the U class] failed when the Canterbury Nor'wester was blowing and would not stand thrashing and consequently lost time." They were soon replaced on these services by the Baldwin built U^{B} class. Before World War One the class averaged 27,000 miles annually.

Superheating was applied in the 1920s, followed by piston valves shortly afterwards. Between 1935 and 1940 the class received Waikato spark arrestors and tender cabs. Second sand domes and standard funnels were added around this time. By now the class were all stationed in Southland and performed branchline work in and around Invercargill, and were well regarded in these duties.

The class as a whole survived into the 1950s and were withdrawn between 1954 and 1959. Some were dumped in rivers as erosion protection in Southland rivers.

== Preservation ==
The remains of the chassis from U194 was stored at Waitara, as part of the ill-fated Hooterville Heritage Charitable Trust depot. Hooterville owner Tony Bachelor fell victim to Donald Rea, who was later arrested for (allegedly) defrauding $26.1 million from investors (including the trust). The financial impact of this on the society caused it to close, leaving the chassis exposed and unrestored. The tender of 194 is stored at the Midland Rail Heritage Trust at Springfield which may be used for one of the Uc's when restored in the future.

== See also ==
- NZR U^{A} class
- NZR U^{B} class
- NZR U^{C} class
- NZR U^{D} class
- Locomotives of New Zealand
