= Springfield Doughnut =

Sculpture in Springfield, New Zealand

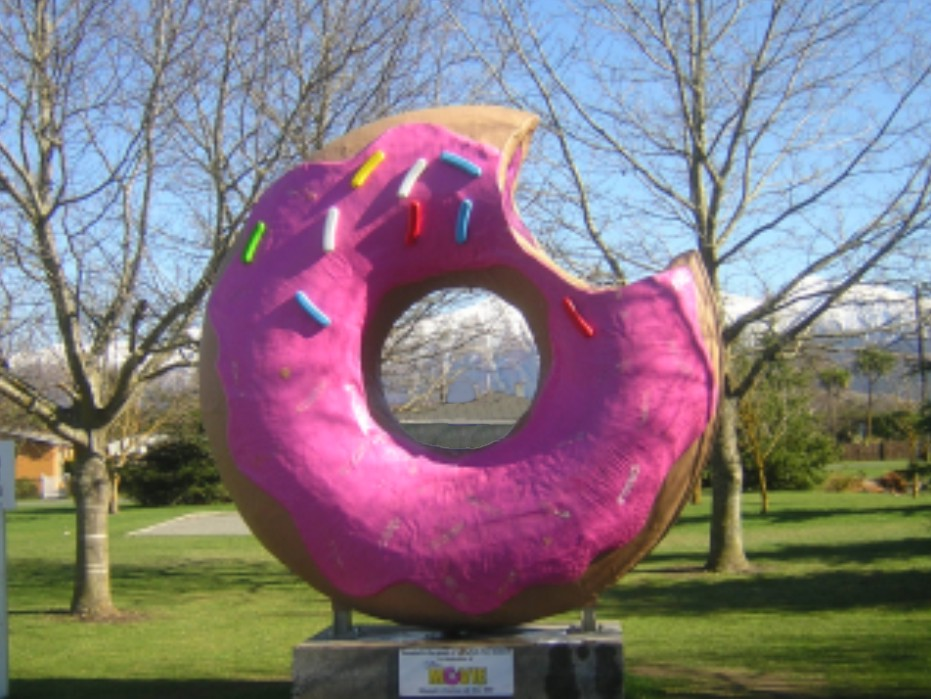
- The original Springfield Doughnut from 2007
- Year: 2007, 2012
- Type: Concrete
- Dimensions: 3.5 m diameter (11 ft)
- Location: Springfield, New Zealand
- Coordinates: 43°20′14″S 171°55′41″E

The Springfield Doughnut is a sculpture of a pink doughnut with sprinkles located in Springfield, New Zealand. It is based on the doughnut frequently featured in the American animated sitcom The Simpsons, which is set in a city also named Springfield. It was presented to the town by 20th Century Fox to promote the 2007 film The Simpsons Movie. The sculpture has a diameter of 3.5 metres (11 ft) and weighs 6 tonnes (5.9 long tons; 6.6 short tons).

== History ==
The original sculpture, constructed from polystyrene encased in fibreglass, was first presented to the town of Springfield in July 2007 by 20th Century Fox in efforts to promote the 2007 film The Simpsons Movie. It was given a resource consent that said the doughnut would only be in place for six weeks. In September 2009, an arsonist lit the doughnut on fire, which destroyed it. As this occurred on the same day as the consent hearings discussing whether the sculpture should remain permanently, there was suspicion that the perpetrator was an opponent of the doughnut who saw it as a degradation of the landscape or believed that the town should "not associate with American cartoons about dysfunctional families". Afterwards, Springfield locals painted a tractor tyre pink and tan, removed a "bite" from it and adorned it with sprinkles to take the place of the destroyed sculpture.

On the afternoon of 1 July 2012, a replacement sculpture was unveiled. This sculpture is made from concrete, has a diameter of 3.5 metres (11 ft) and weighs 6 tonnes (5.9 long tons; 6.6 short tons). It is fireproof and has steps that allow people to take pictures with their heads poking through the middle. Between 2020 and 2023, after the paintwork began flaking and falling off, the sculpture was repainted four times, costing $17,864.
