= Omoto locomotive dump =

Locomotive dump site near Greymouth, New Zealand

Western end of the locomotive dump in 2025 during low tide.

Omoto locomotive dump is a New Zealand Railways locomotive and rolling stock dump site located near Greymouth, New Zealand. The dump site is located on the southern bank of the Grey River, close to the Midland Line and State Highway 6.

== History of locomotive dumps ==
All locomotives and rolling stock inevitably reach obsolescence. When the cost of scrap metal dropped below an economic level, the New Zealand Railways found other uses for withdrawn locomotives and rolling stock. Some were discarded in locomotive dumps to protect the railway formation against erosion or soft ground. The railway line at Omoto suffered from severe erosion caused by flooding of the adjacent Grey River. During the 1950s, many obsolete locomotives and wagons on the South Island's West Coast were, accordingly, dumped here. Since disposal, Omoto, along with other locomotive dumps, has provided a treasure trove to many people interested in Railway archaeology.

The first conclusive locomotive dumpings to occur at Omoto began in 1957 and continued up to 1961. It is believed, however, that the dumpings started at an earlier date, as L^{A} 312 was dumped in 1929, while the remains of P 135 were dumped in 1933. Large scale dumping did not take place until 1957, when a number of withdrawn locomotives, components of locomotives, and withdrawn wagons of various classes were dumped there.

== Locomotives dumped at Omoto ==
Class and Road number	Type	Builder	Builder's number	Notes
F 5	0-6-0ST	Robert Stephenson and Company	2611	
F 277	0-6-0ST	Robert Stephenson and Company	2597	Built for Hungerford & McKay Ltd, to NZR stock 1895. Fitted with a larger cab in the 1920s.
L^{A} 312	4-4-0T	Nasmyth Wilson	322	Ex NZ Midland Railway Co, N^{O} 3. Recovered 2005. Awaiting restoration at Midland Rail Heritage Trust, Springfield, NZ.
P 135	2-8-0	Nasmyth Wilson	275	
U^{B} 330	4-6-0	Baldwin Locomotive Works	18576	Located beneath U^{C} 365.
U^{B} 331	4-6-0	Baldwin Locomotive Works	18577	
U^{C} 361	4-6-0	Sharp, Stewart and Company	4745	
U^{C} 362	4-6-0	Sharp, Stewart and Company	4746	
U^{C} 365	4-6-0	Sharp, Stewart and Company	4749	
U^{C} 369	4-6-0	Sharp, Stewart and Company	4753	Recovered 2005. Awaiting restoration at Midland Rail Heritage Trust, Springfield, NZ.
U^{C} 370	4-6-0	Sharp, Stewart and Company	4754	Recovered 2005. Awaiting restoration at Midland Rail Heritage Trust, Springfield, NZ.
W^{B} 298	2-6-2T	Baldwin Locomotive Works	16174	Boiler only.

== Other locomotive dump sites ==
- Westfield, Auckland
- Oamaru
- Beaumont
- Branxholme
- Mararoa
- Bealey River
- Waimakariri River
- Mōkihinui River
