= Project Steam =

Railway preservation group in New Zealand

Project Steam is a railway preservation society based in Dunedin, New Zealand. It is dedicated to the restoration of steam locomotives formerly operated by the New Zealand Railways Department, with its goal to restore at least one locomotive to main line operating conditions in order to operate excursions from Dunedin Railway Station. The society is currently the only one of its kind in Dunedin; the Ocean Beach Railway operates small tank locomotives but on private trackage, and the popular Taieri Gorge Limited is run solely by diesel locomotives.

The restoration of P 107, also using some parts from the remains of P 25, is currently the focus of Project Steam's efforts. The two locomotives were built in 1885 by Nasmyth, Wilson and Company, entered service in 1887, were withdrawn in 1928, and on 8 August 1932 were dumped in the Clutha River near Beaumont to protect the Roxburgh Branch from erosion. Their remains were recovered in May 1992, and as the frame of P 107 was in a better condition, it was chosen for restoration, with extra parts sourced from P 25, most notably its wheels, which were in better condition to P 107's.

During the celebration of the Dunedin Railway Station's centennial in October 2006, P 107 was displayed in partially rebuilt condition at the station. Funds are currently being raised for the next and most costly stage of the restoration, the reconstruction of P 107's boiler. The restoration is historically significant as the locomotive is one of, if not the earliest known surviving example of a British-built 2-8-0. Once fully restored, there are proposals to establish a regular service run by P 107 as a tourist attraction, such as a service modelled on the Kingston Flyer. It would run over the preserved track of the Otago Central Railway between Pukerangi and Middlemarch, connecting with the Taieri Gorge Railway's daily diesel-hauled services between Dunedin and Pukerangi.

Project Steam's first home was a location by the Water of Leith in central Dunedin. Later the group moved most of the restorable items to the Dunedin Gas Works, where the frame and wheels of P 107 were continued to be worked on while P 25's frame (cut into sections) could be found stored onsite. All other components such as spare wheels, old tender bodies and the boilers were moved to a field next to the Taieri Gorge Railway at Sutton. In 2008, with redevelopment occurring at the Gas Works necessitating the group's removal from the Gas Works, P 107 was shifted to Springfield and is now located at the Midland Rail Heritage Trust. It is understood that the group will continue to restore P 107 to operational order at Springfield.
