= NZR UD class =

Class of 2 New Zealand 4-6-0 locomotives

NZR U^{D} class
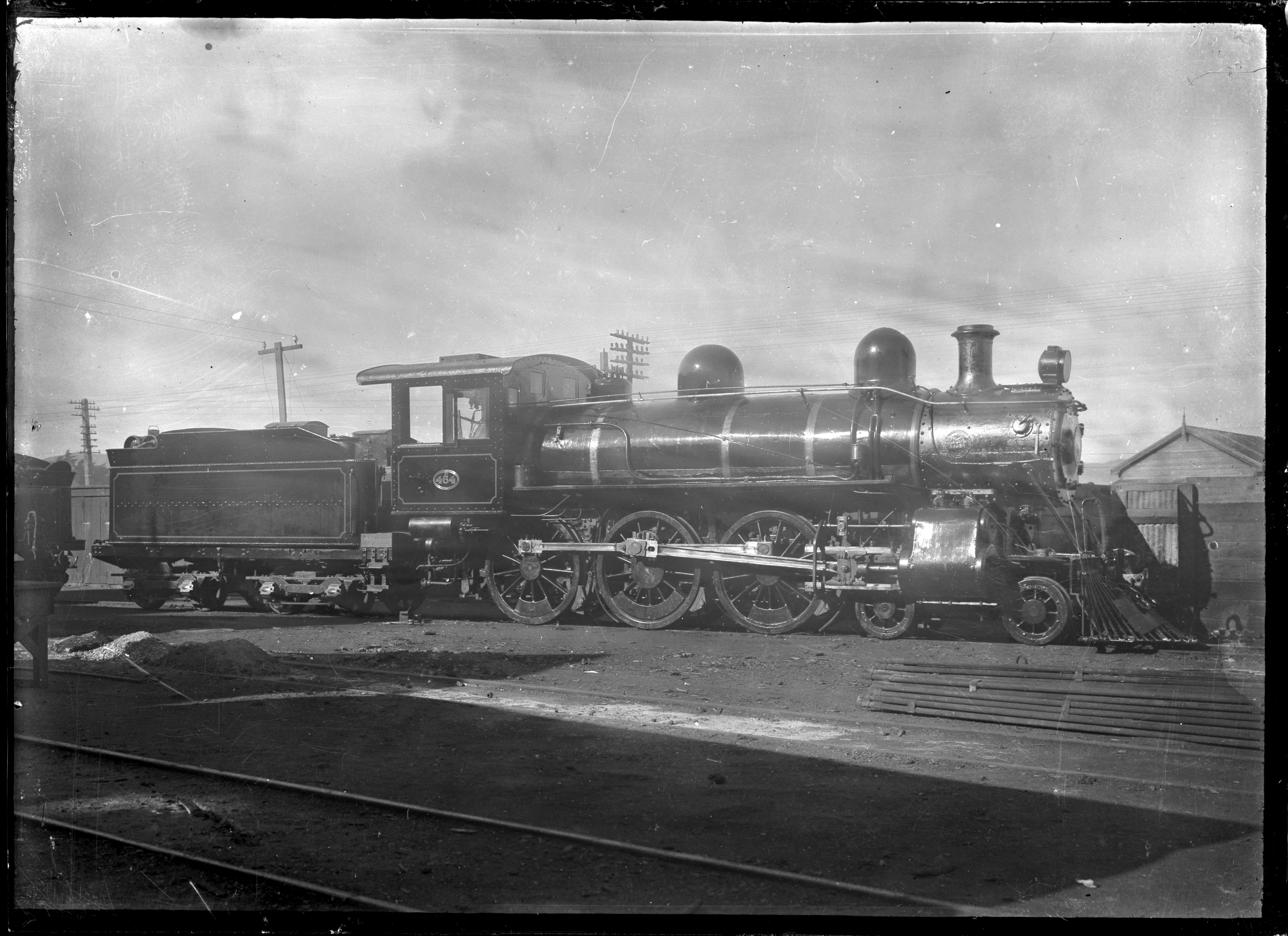
- Ud Class no 464 between 1909 and 1929
Type and origin
- Power type: Steam
- Builder: Baldwin Locomotive Works
- Build date: 1904
- Total produced: 2
Specifications
- Configuration
  - Whyte: 4-6-0
- Gauge: 3 ft 6 in (1,067 mm)
- Driver dia.: 58 in (1,473 mm)
- Adhesive weight: 29.2 long tons (29.7 t; 32.7 short tons)
- Loco weight: 39.5 long tons (40.1 t; 44.2 short tons)
- Tender weight: 27.4 long tons (27.8 t; 30.7 short tons)
- Fuel type: Coal
- Water cap.: 2,400 imp gal (11,000 L; 2,900 US gal)
- Tender cap.: 5 long tons (5.1 t; 5.6 short tons)
- Firebox
  - Grate area: 16.5 sq ft (1.53 m^{2})
- Boiler pressure: 185 psi (1,276 kPa)
- Heating surface: 1,095 sq ft (101.7 m^{2})
- Cylinders: 2
- Cylinder size: 16.5 in × 22 in (419 mm × 559 mm)
- Valve gear: Stephenson
Performance figures
- Tractive effort: 15,280 lbf (68.0 kN)
Career
- Number in class: 2
- Retired: 1929

The NZR U^{D} class was a class of two 4-6-0 steam locomotives built by the Baldwin Locomotive Works in 1904 for the Wellington and Manawatu Railway Company. When that company was nationalised in 1908, they passed into the ownership of the New Zealand Railways and received the designation U^{D}.

== Introduction ==
The two locomotives were the final new motive power ordered by the independent Wellington and Manawatu Railway Company.

== Specification ==
Weighing 39.5 long tons (40.1 t; 44.2 short tons) with a tender of 27.4 long tons (27.8 t; 30.7 short tons), they could haul express trains easily at 50 miles per hour (80 km/h) on track that was flat or only a light grade. The 58 inches (1,473 mm) coupled driving wheels were large for the period, and were the largest to run in New Zealand. Their working steam pressure was 185 pounds per square inch (1,276 kPa), and they had 16.5 inches (419 mm) diameter cylinders with 22 inches (559 mm) piston strokes.

The handsome U^{D} locomotives were more than capable of making up lost time, with mile-a-minute runs recalled with pride by Manawatu railway employees. Due to their power, the locomotives were capable of hauling mail trains without the need for a banking locomotive from Paekakariki south to Pukerua Bay, and were used principally on mail trains north of Paekakariki.

== Withdrawal ==
Although they were fast and powerful, the U^{D} locomotives were unable to survive a programme of standardisation undertaken between 1925 and 1935 to eliminate small locomotive classes that were costly to maintain in favour of large, homogeneous types that provided economies of scale. They were written off in 1929.
