= Sharplin Falls =

Waterfall in the Canterbury Region of New Zealand

- Tāhekura (Māori)
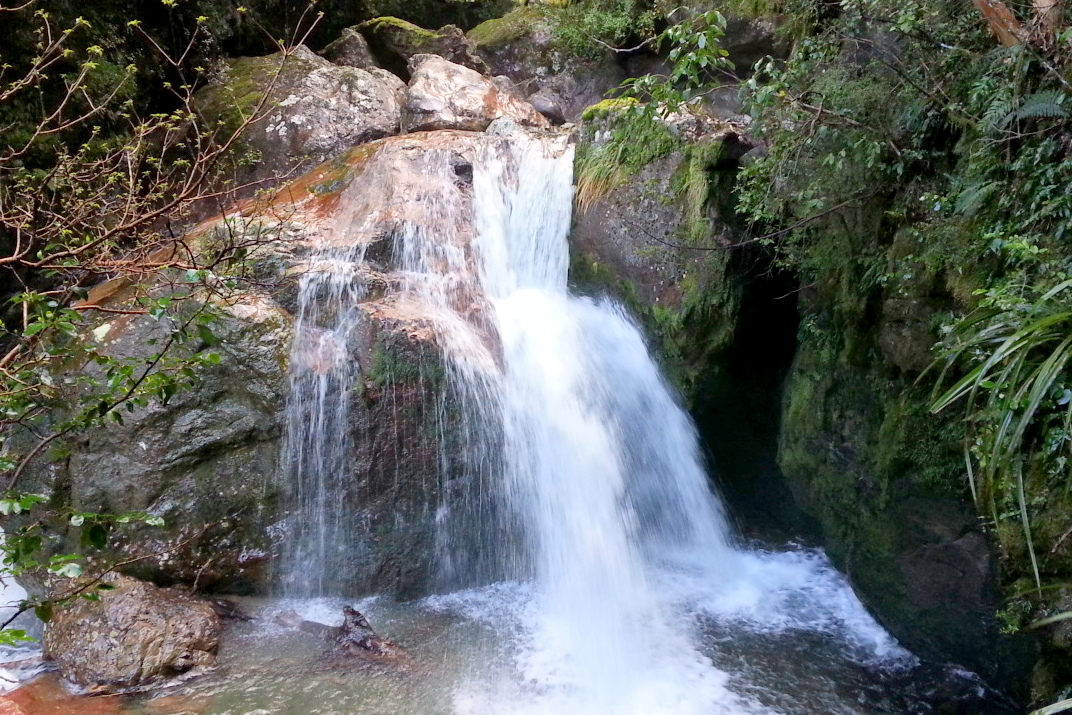
- Sharplin Falls
- Interactive map of Sharplin Falls
- Location: Staveley, New Zealand
- Coordinates: 43°37′30.5″S 171°24′33.4″E
- Type: Cascade
- Elevation: 560 m (1,840 ft)
- Watercourse: Bowyers Stream
Sharplin Falls Track
- Length: 1.3 km (0.81 mi)
- Location: Staveley, New Zealand
- Trailheads: Flynns Road
- Elevation change: 88 m (289 ft)
- Difficulty: easy
- Sights: native forest
- Surface: gravel path

Sharplin Falls (Māori: Tāhekura) is a waterfall on Bowyers Stream in the Staveley district of mid-Canterbury in the South Island of New Zealand. The waterfall is located within a scenic reserve, and there is a popular walking track to a viewing platform. Sharplin Falls is located in a deep gully beneath the fault scarp that separates Mount Somers / Te Kiekie from Mount Winterslow, near the small settlement of Staveley. The falls and 1.3-kilometre-long (0.81 mi) access track are located within the 247 ha (610 acres) Sharplin Falls Scenic Reserve. The track to the falls passes through mixed beech forest that provides habitat for endemic birds including fantail (piwakawaka), bellbird (korimako), tomtit (miromiro), and kererū (the New Zealand pigeon). The forest includes Metrosideros umbellata (southern rātā), a species that has limited distribution in Canterbury.

== History ==
=== Establishment of the reserve ===
In the 1890, Henry Havelock Sharplin established a timber mill at Staveley, employing around 50 men. He owned around 650 ha (1,600 acres) in the area. In 1908, Sharplin proposed that the Government should make an exchange of land with him, so that the area around the Sharplin Falls could become a scenic reserve. The Commissioner of Crown Lands in Canterbury visited Sharplin Falls in November 1908 to assess the proposal. The site was already a popular location for picnics at that time. An exchange of land was agreed by 1910, and an area was designated as the Sharplin Falls Scenic Reserve, with the land initially protected under the Scenery Preservation Act 1903.

=== Road access ===
In 1925, newspapers reported that the Sharplin Falls were not visited frequently because of the difficulty of access. Motorists wanted to access the reserve but there were no roads into the area. In 1927, the Mt Somers Road Board declined to fund a new access road, despite consent already having been obtained from Government for a road through the reserve. Lack of road access to the Sharplin Falls remained a concern for the local community, and in February 1936, the Advance Staveley Association was formed to promote improved access. The Ashburton County Council agreed in April 1936 to survey and legalise the track into the Sharplin Falls as a step towards providing road access. A road survey was completed by July 1937.

In March 1941, severe flooding throughout the Ashburton District caused extensive damage, and the road to the Sharplin Falls was washed away.

=== Control of the reserve ===
In 1939, control of the Sharplin Falls Scenic Reserve (area 223 ha (552 acres)), was vested by Government in the County Council for a period of five years. This arrangement was renewed in 1944, and again in 1950.

In 1987, the reserve came under the control of the newly-formed Department of Conservation. An existing swing bridge was replaced with a steel truss bridge in 1992. To improve access and safety, in 1990, a gantry walkway was built around a rocky bluff.

=== Closure of the track (2015) ===
The track to Sharplin Falls suffered damage in the 2010 Canterbury earthquake, with slips taking out 10 m (33 ft) of the route. The track was closed in February 2015 after a rockfall took out a part of the track built as a gantry along a rock face. Two years later, the Department of Conservation announced that the closure of the track to Sharplin Falls would be permanent.

=== Construction of a new track ===
There was considerable demand for the re-opening of a track to the falls, and the Mt Somers Walkways Society eventually obtained environmental consents for the construction of a new track. A route for the new track was chosen mostly along the true right of Bowyers Stream, to avoid the problems with rock fall that had affected the previous track. After five years of fundraising and 3,500 hours of volunteer labour, a new 1.3 km (0.81 mi) track was built. The route required two new steel truss footbridges, walkways and a viewing platform. The new track was opened by the Mt Somers Walkways Society in June 2023, and they will manage on-going maintenance.

== Access ==
The road access to the Sharplin Falls Scenic Reserve is via Flynns Road, off the Inland Scenic Route 72 at Staveley. The Sharplin Falls car park at the road end has toilets and an information panel.
