= Bowyers Stream =

Stream in the Canterbury Region, New Zealand

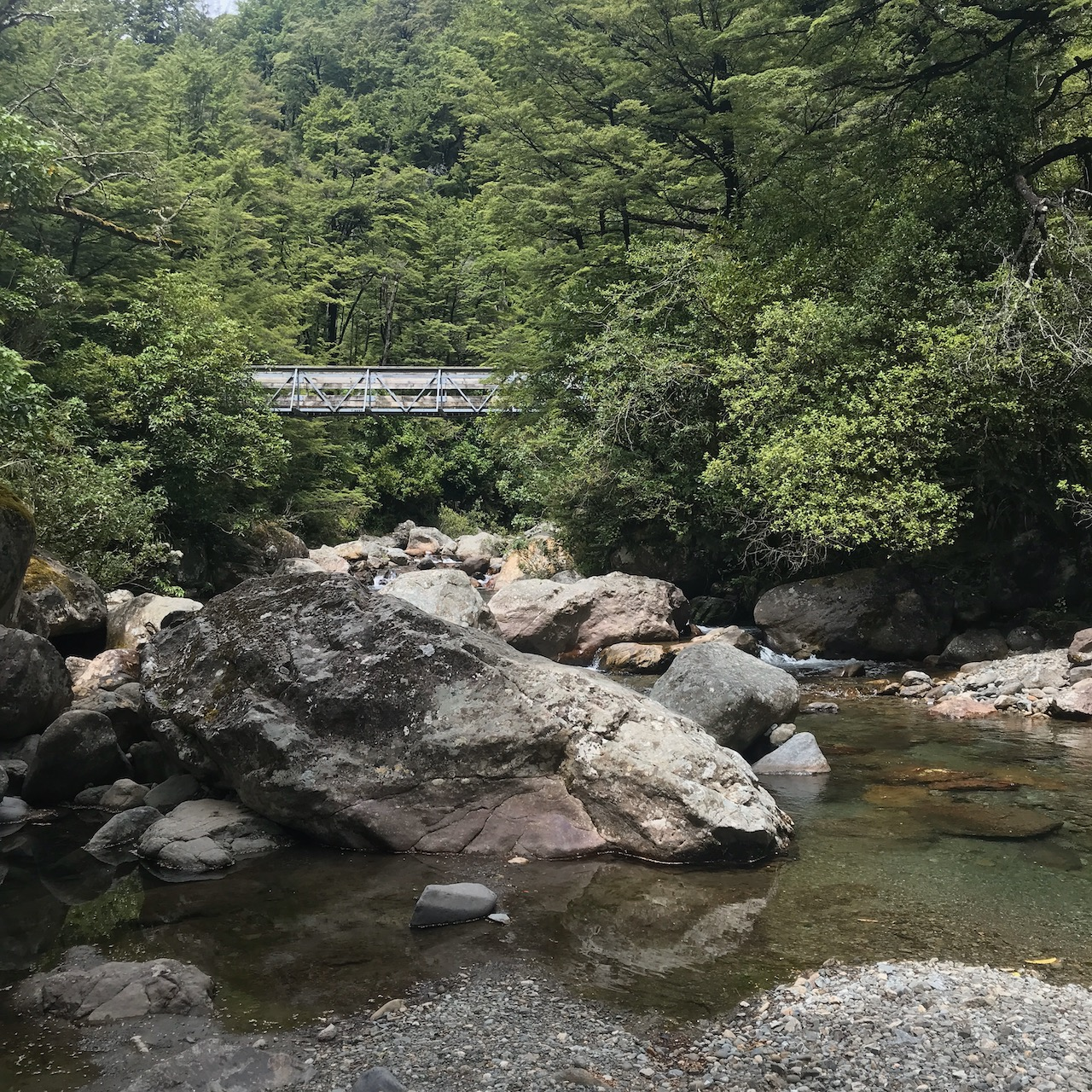
- Route of Bowyers Stream
- Bowyers Stream Bowyers Stream (South Island)

Location
- Country: New Zealand

Physical characteristics
- Source
  - location: Mount Somers / Te Kiekie
  - coordinates: 43°37′05″S 171°22′33″E
  - elevation: 1,600 metres (5,200 ft)
- Mouth
  - location: Ashburton River South Branch / Hakatere
  - coordinates: 43°44′19″S 171°32′12″E
  - elevation: 245 metres (804 ft)
- Basin size: 23.2 km^{2} (9.0 mi^{2})

Basin features
- Progression: Bowyers Stream → Ashburton River South Branch / Hakatere → Ashburton River / Hakatere → Pacific Ocean
- Tributaries
  - left: Taylors Stream
  - right: Caves Stream, Stevenson Stream
- Waterfalls: Sharplin Falls

Bowyers Stream is located in the Canterbury Region of the South Island of New Zealand. (Note: The origin of the name of the stream is uncertain, but the Lyttelton Times of 10 December 1869 reports on proceedings in the Supreme Court, where Robert Bowyer states that he is a sawyer at Halford Forest, Ashburton.)

The upper reaches of the stream drain the northern face of Mount Somers / Te Kiekie and the southern face of Mount Winterslow in the foothills of the Southern Alps. Sharplin Falls is located in Bowyers Stream in a deep gully beneath the fault scarp between Mount Somers / Te Kiekie and Mount Winterslow, near the small settlement of Staveley. The stream joins the south branch of the Ashburton River / Hakatere, at Annandale, west of Ashburton Forks.

The stream has been a contributor to severe flooding in the Staveley region.

Introduced trout were reported as being plentiful in Bowyers Stream in 1899. In 1930, around 10,000 brown trout fry were released into the stream by the Ashburton Acclimatisation Society, with a further 50,000 trout fry released in 1933, and 60,000 more in 1942. Bowyers Stream has become an important tributary of the Ashburton River for trout and salmon spawning. In 2017, Environment Canterbury undertook flood-control works along a stretch of 11 km (6.8 mi) in the bed of the river. The Central South Island Fish and Game Council commenced a prosecution of Environment Canterbury under the Conservation Act for disturbance to the spawning grounds of freshwater fish. The parties reached agreement in 2019 and the prosecution did not continue. In September 2019, there were concerns from landowners about the build-up of gravel in the stream bed, with calls for the stream bed to be lowered to reduce flooding risk.

The Rangitata Diversion Race passes beneath the bed of Bowyers Stream in a siphon, around 1.5 km (0.93 mi) south of Staveley.

The Bowyers Stream Reserve is a freedom camping site located where the Inland Scenic Route crosses Bowyers Stream around 3.4 km (2.1 mi) south of Staveley.
