= Mount Somers / Te Kiekie =

Mountain in New Zealand

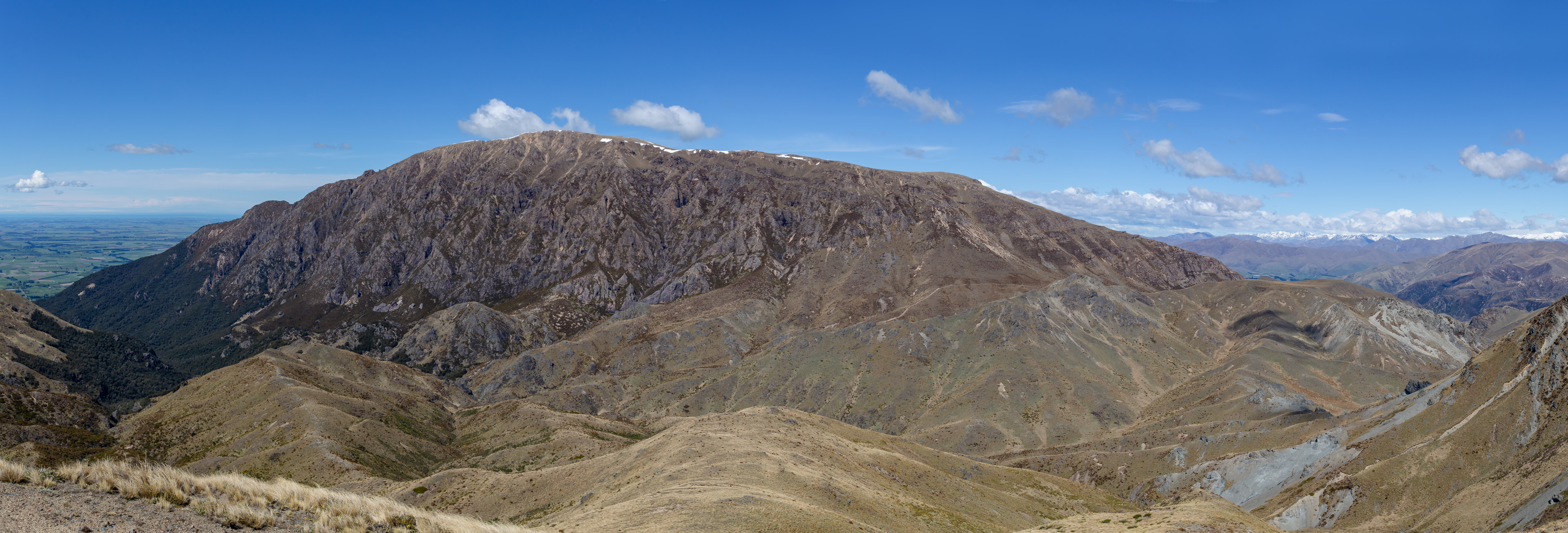
- Mount Somers from Mount Winterslow

Highest point
- Elevation: 1,688 m (5,538 ft)
- Listing: List of mountains of New Zealand by height
- Coordinates: 43°37′9.39″S 171°22′27.81″E

Naming
- Native name: Te Kiekie (Māori)

Geography
- Location in Canterbury
- Location: South Island, New Zealand
- Parent range: Southern Alps

Geology
- Rock age: Cretaceous (89 Ma )

Climbing
- Easiest route: Mount Somers Summit Track

Mount Somers / Te Kiekie is a mountain in the South Island of New Zealand, located in the foothills of the Southern Alps. At 1,688 metres (5,538 ft), it is prominently visible from the Canterbury Plains. The area around the mountain offers opportunities for day walks and overnight tramping.

== Etymology ==
The mountain's Māori name, Te Kiekie, refers to a chief who arrived on the Āraiteuru canoe. The European name was given by the surveyor of the Canterbury Association, Captain Joseph Thomas, and recorded on his 1849 map of Canterbury. Like most names assigned by Thomas, it commemorates a member of the Canterbury Association, in this case the banker and MP Thomas Somers-Cocks (1815–1899).

The mountain's European name was later used for a settlement, Mount Somers, and then a branch line railway, the Mount Somers Branch. The settlement is 10 kilometres (6.2 mi) south of the mountain's summit.

== History ==
Māori traversed the area both to access the timber and wildlife of Alford Forest and to exploit their discovery of a hard greenish stone (Surrey Hills Tuff porcelainite) for making knives and adzes. The mountain's high country portion was farmed until the 1970s after being settled as a sheep station in 1856 by the lawyer pair Charles Tripp and John Acland, who had got the idea of farming in the new colony from acquaintances interested in the Canterbury Association. However, by the time they had accumulated experience in farming, only high country tussock land—unattractive to others—was available at a price they could afford. The business partnership that lasted to 1862 made both men rich in short order and when the partnership ended Charles Tripp, by now the brother in law of John Acland, became sole owner of the Mount Somers land.

== Geology and botany ==
Map of selected surface volcanic features near Mount Somers / Te Kiekie (red marker). The label on the map is the township. Legend: Key for the volcanics that are shown with panning is: basalt (shades of brown/orange); monogenetic basalts; undifferentiated basalts; arc basalts; arc ring basalts; olivine (basalts shades of olive); phonolite (pale salmon); dacite; andesite (shades of red); basaltic andesite; rhyolite, (ignimbrite is lighter shades of violet); plutonic or intusive (gray) - so dolerite/diabase/microgabbro will have shadings towards gray compared to erupted basalt.; Clicking on the rectangle icon enables full window and mouse-over with volcano name/wikilink and ages before present.

Most of the hills in the Mid Canterbury area are made up of greywacke. Mount Somers / Te Kiekie is of volcanic origin, though, as an overlay of the Torlesse Composite Terrane. There are areas of andesite, rhyolite, basalt and ignimbrite that erupted 89 million years ago that form part of the Mount Somers Volcanic Group that extends to the Banks Peninsula.

There are fault lines visible, columns, and cooling fractures. Especially to the east of the mountain, there are viable deposits of silica, sand, limestone, and coal.

Soils have poor fertility. Some areas form plateaus and combined with high rainfall, the area is ideal for plants that prefer boggy conditions. Up to 1,200 m (3,900 ft) there are stands of native forest, known as the Alford Forest. This has a smaller stand in the Woolshed Creek valley (known as 'Ancient Forest'), and a larger stand on the south and east flanks of Mount Somers and the adjacent Mount Winterslow.

== Tramping in the area ==
=== Miners Track ===
The area's coal deposits were first discovered in 1856, which led to the founding of the village Mount Somers. A tramline was built to get the coal to the village. Mining for coal stopped in 1954. The route of the tramline is now part of the tramping track called Miners Track that goes from the Woolshed Creek car park to Woolshed Creek Hut. The walk to Woolshed Creek Hut via Miners Track is one of the best known tramps in Mid Canterbury. A more challenging route to Woolshed Creek Hut is via the Rhyolite Ridge Track past an overhang which is named the Bus Stop.

=== Mt Somers Track ===
The Mt Somers Walkways Society formed in 1983, made up of locals from Mount Somers and Staveley. Their aim was to create a circular track around the mountain and the Mt Somers Track was officially opened in 1987. In the late 2000s, (Note: The article is undated but refers to a past event in October 2006, and was written during the reign of Ashburton mayor Bede O'Malley, who was mayor until October 2010.) a tramping shelter was added to the southern part of the track and this saw the official completion of the project. That tramping shelter is named Acland shelter, is located above Mount Somers Station, and is named for the original European owner of the land – John Acland.

Mt Somers Track starts and finishes at Sharplin Falls car park. The northern part of the circuit follows Bowyers Stream for a while. Mt Somers Track, after following Bowyers Stream for some distance, reaches Pinnacles Hut. The hut was named for the rock formation behind it on the north face of Mount Somers / Te Kiekie. The track then climbs over Mount Somers saddle before it descends to Woolshed Creek Hut. From the hut, the track ascends to the overhand known as the Bus Stop. It then continues via the Acland Shelter along the south face of Mount Somers / Te Kiekie and climbs up onto Staveley Hill, the point where the Mt Somers Summit Track starts. From Staveley Hill, the track descends towards the Sharplin Falls car park.

=== The summit ===
The summit of Mount Somers / Te Kiekie can be reached via the southern part of the Mt Somers Track, starting from either the Woolshed Creek car park, or the Sharplin Falls car park. The Mt Somers Summit Track is the side track to the summit. It is located on the south face of the mountain and gets very icy in winter and is then difficult to climb. A further route to the summit is the Te Kiekie track that connects from the Mt Somers Track on the north side of the mountain to the west of Pinnacles Hut.

=== Sharplin Falls Track ===
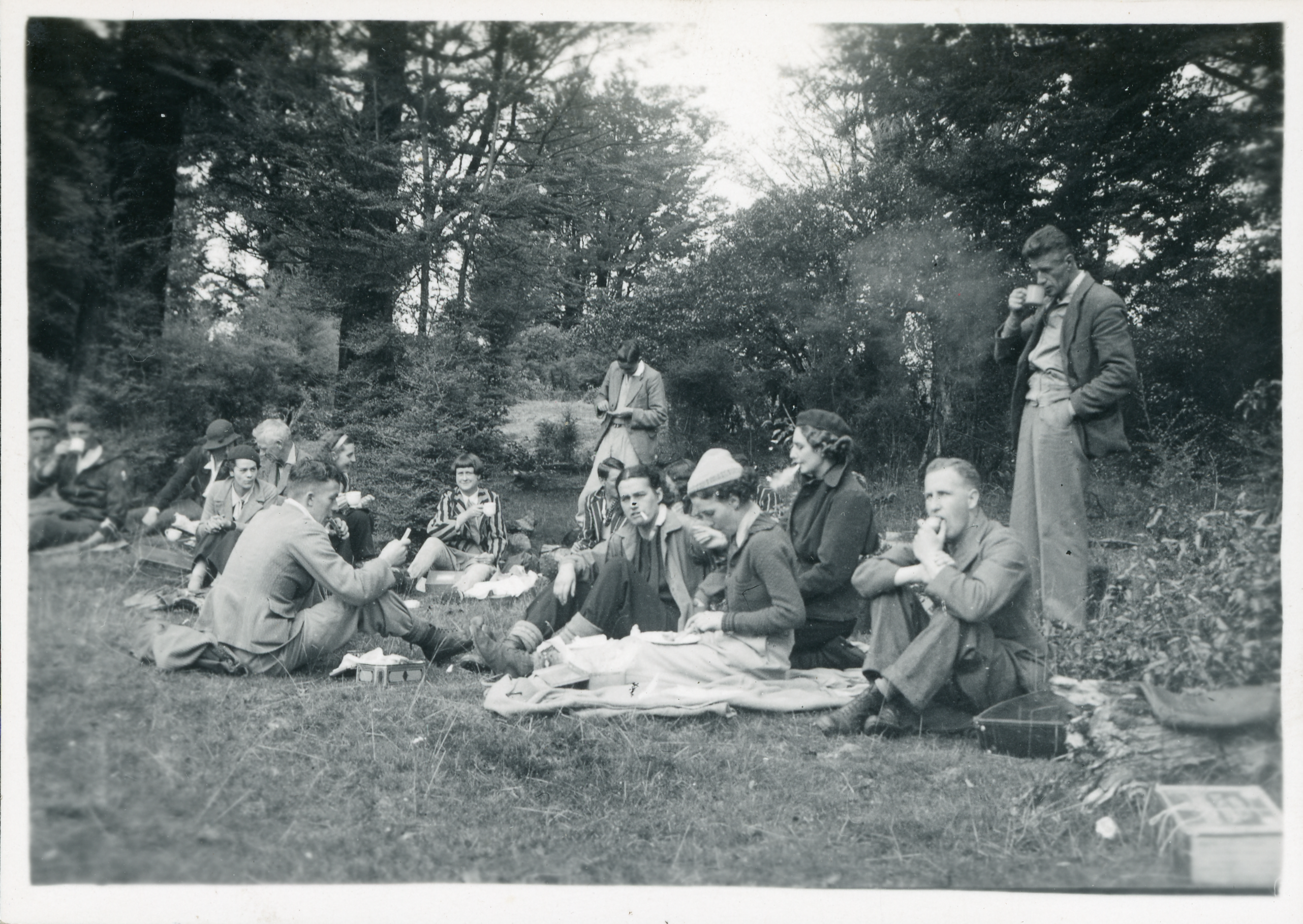
"Smoke-oh" at Sharplin Falls, ca. 1935–37, with Ashburton Tramping Club members

A once popular destination, the track to Sharplin Falls on Bowyers Stream was closed in February 2015 after a rockfall took out a part of the track built as a gantry along a rock face. Two years later, the Department of Conservation announced that the closure of the side track to Sharplin Falls would be permanent. There was considerable demand for the re-opening of a track to the falls, and the Mt Somers Walkways Society eventually obtained environmental consents for the construction of a new track. After five years of fundraising and 3,500 hours of volunteer labour, a new 1.5 km (0.93 mi) track with two new bridges was opened in June 2023.

Tramping in the Mount Somers / Te Kiekie area
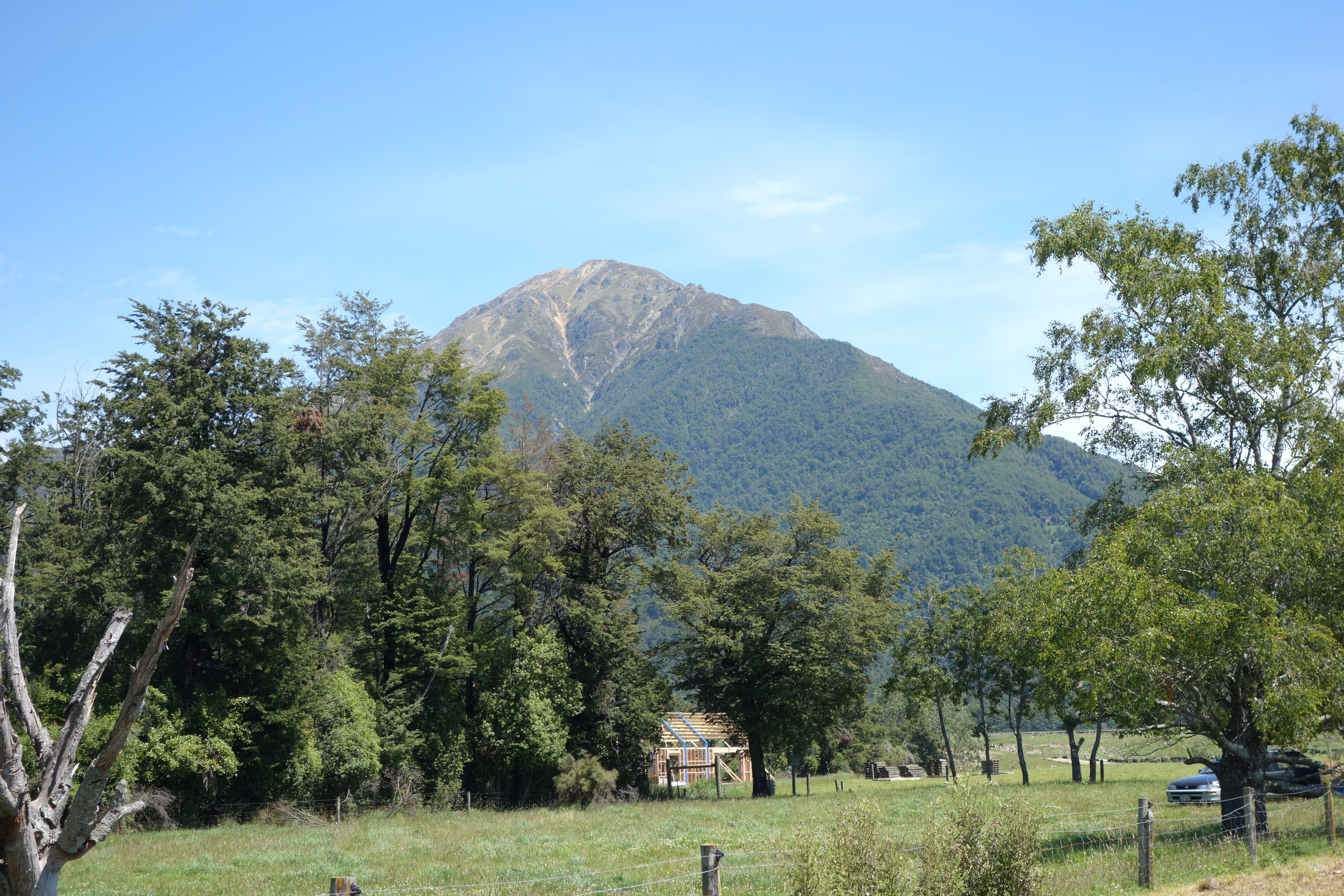
Mount Somers / Te Kiekie seen from Staveley

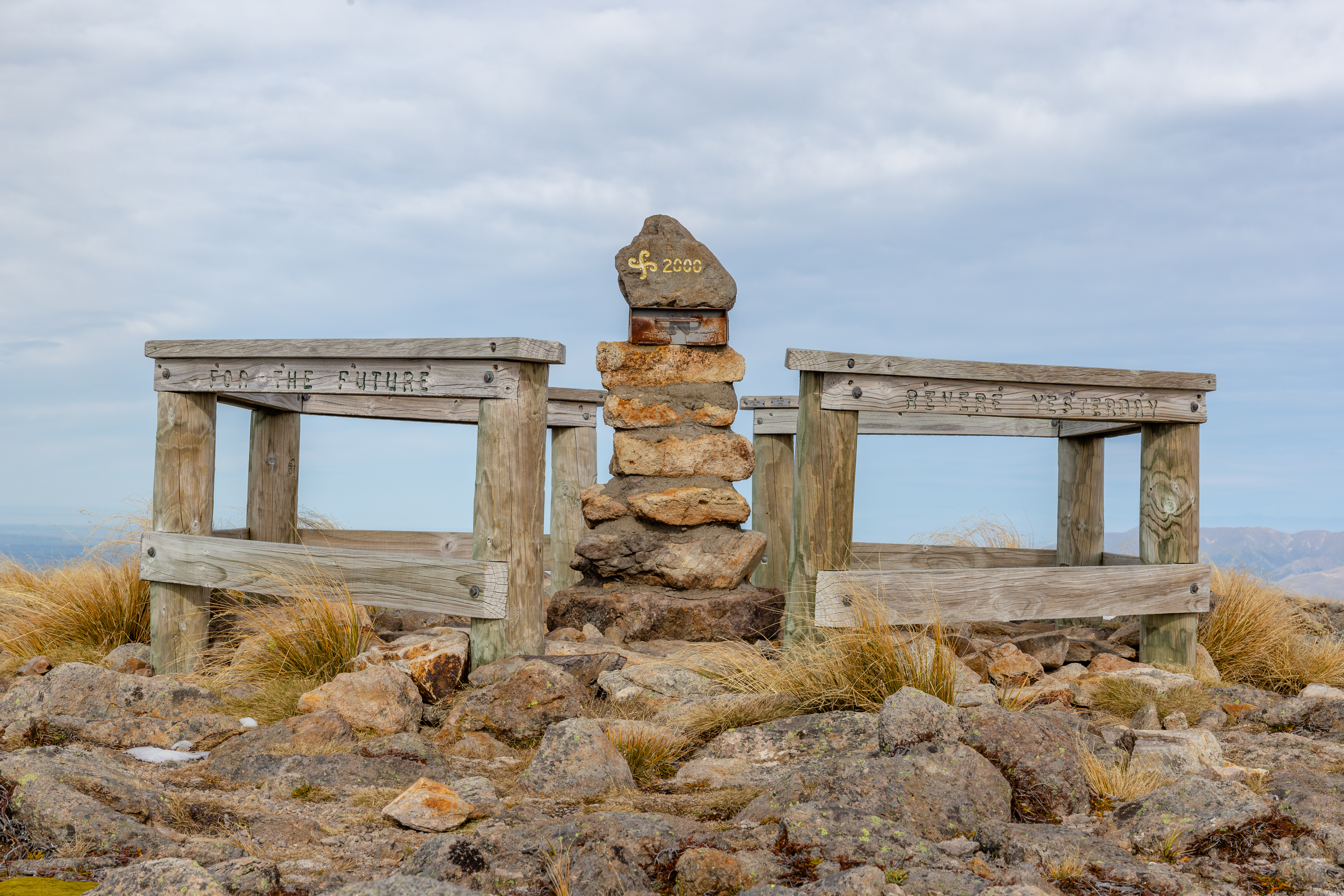
Summit of Mount Somers / Te Kiekie

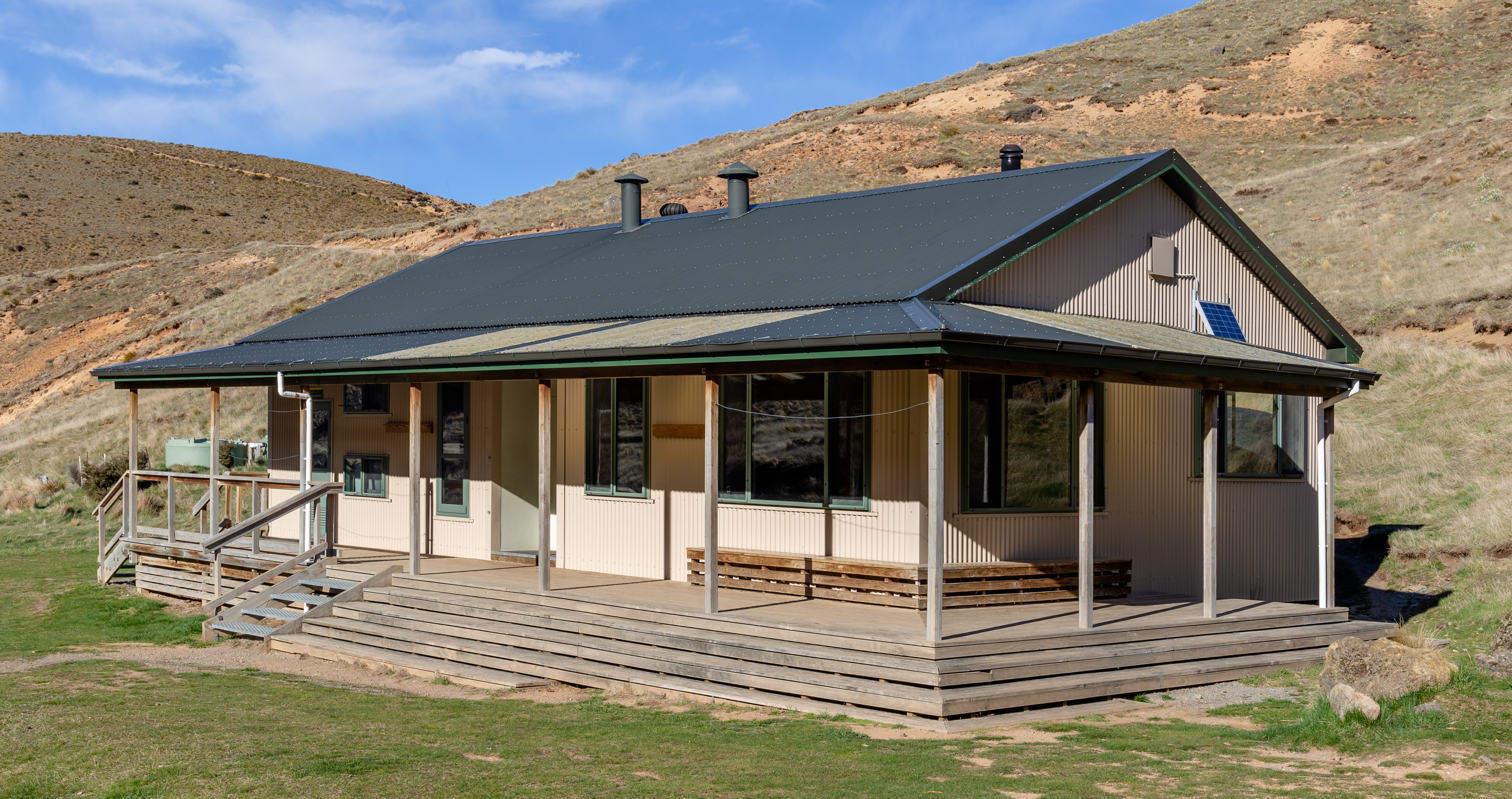
Woolshed Creek Hut

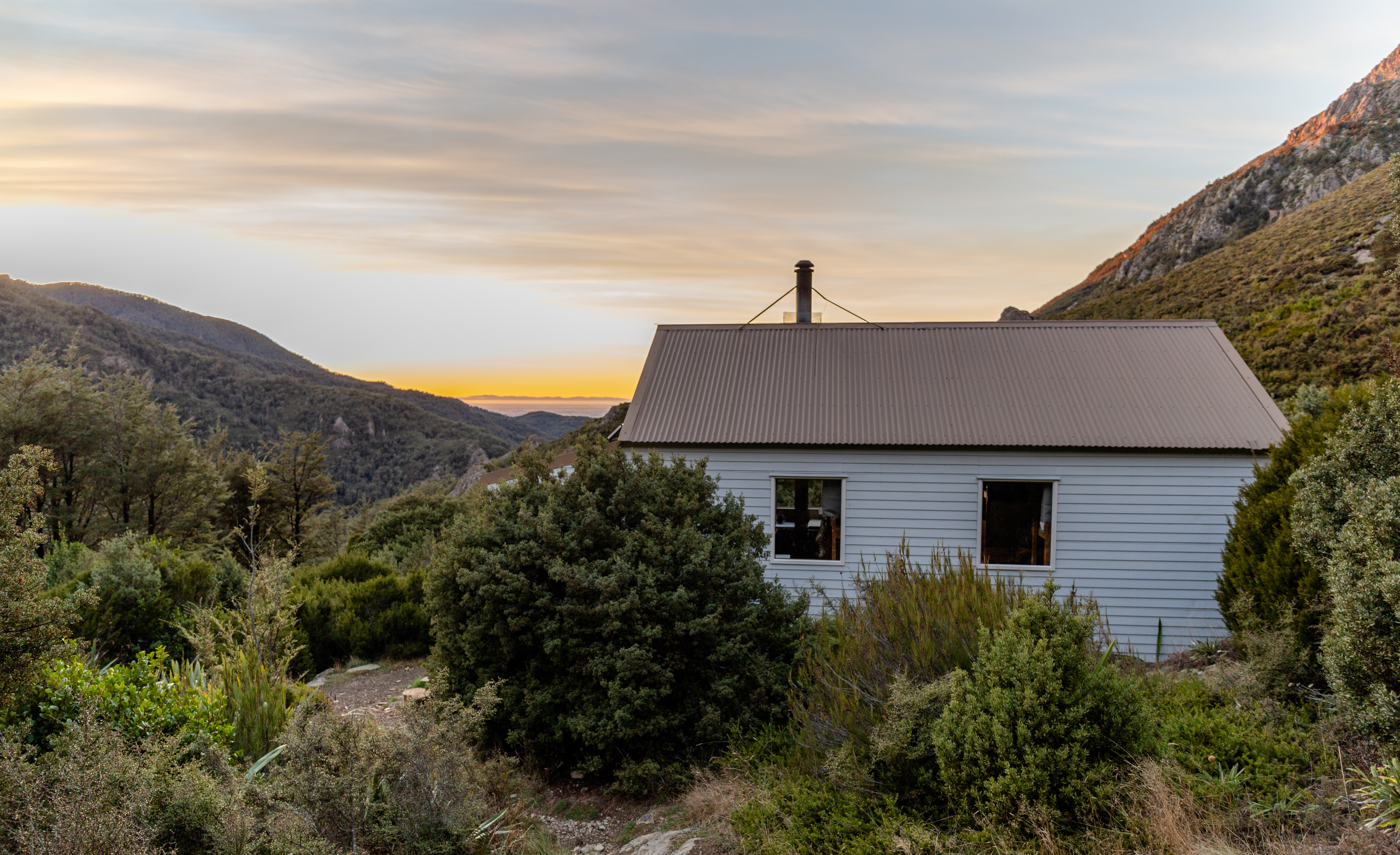
Pinnacles Hut

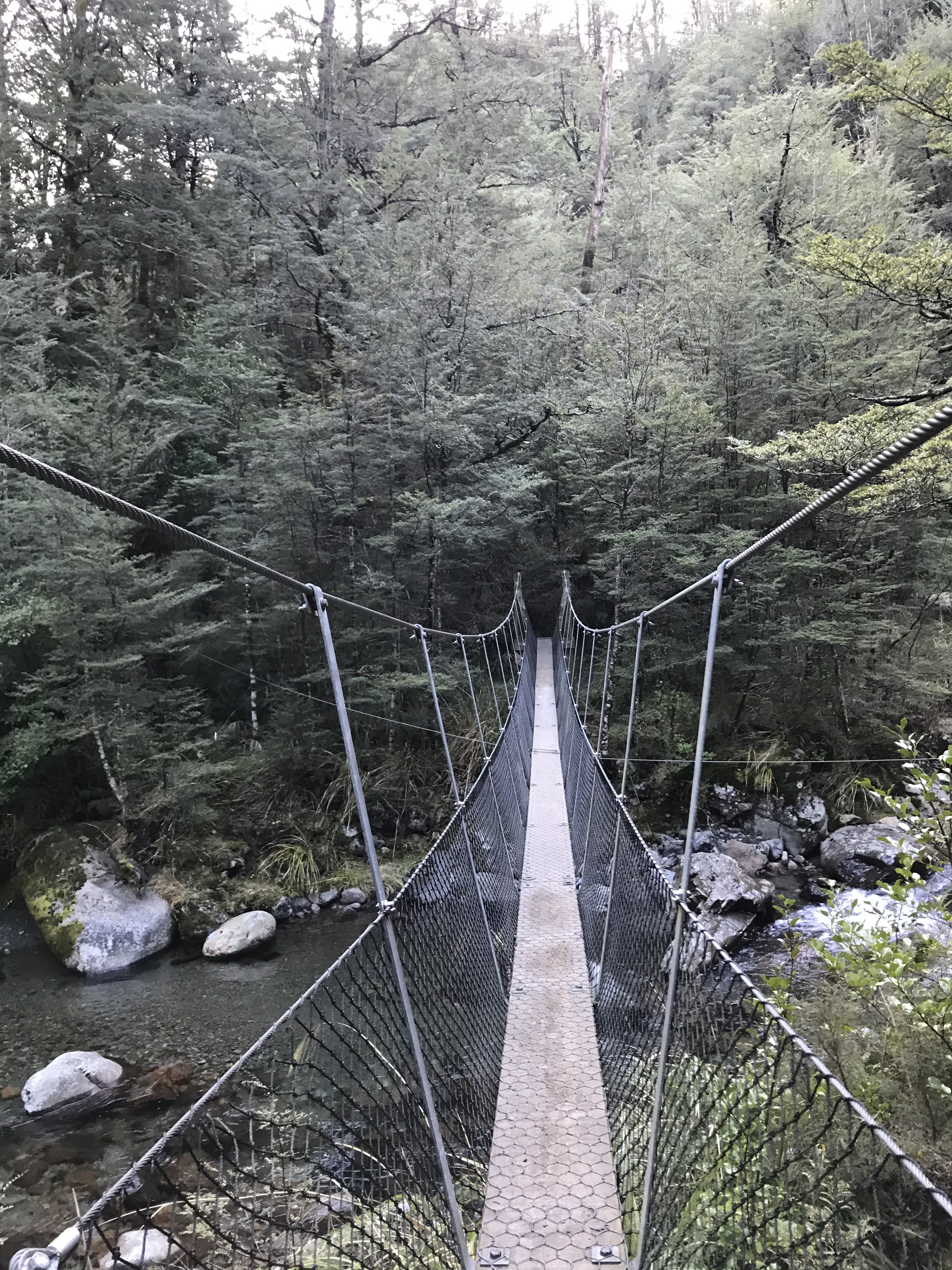
Halfway Bridge over Bowyers Stream

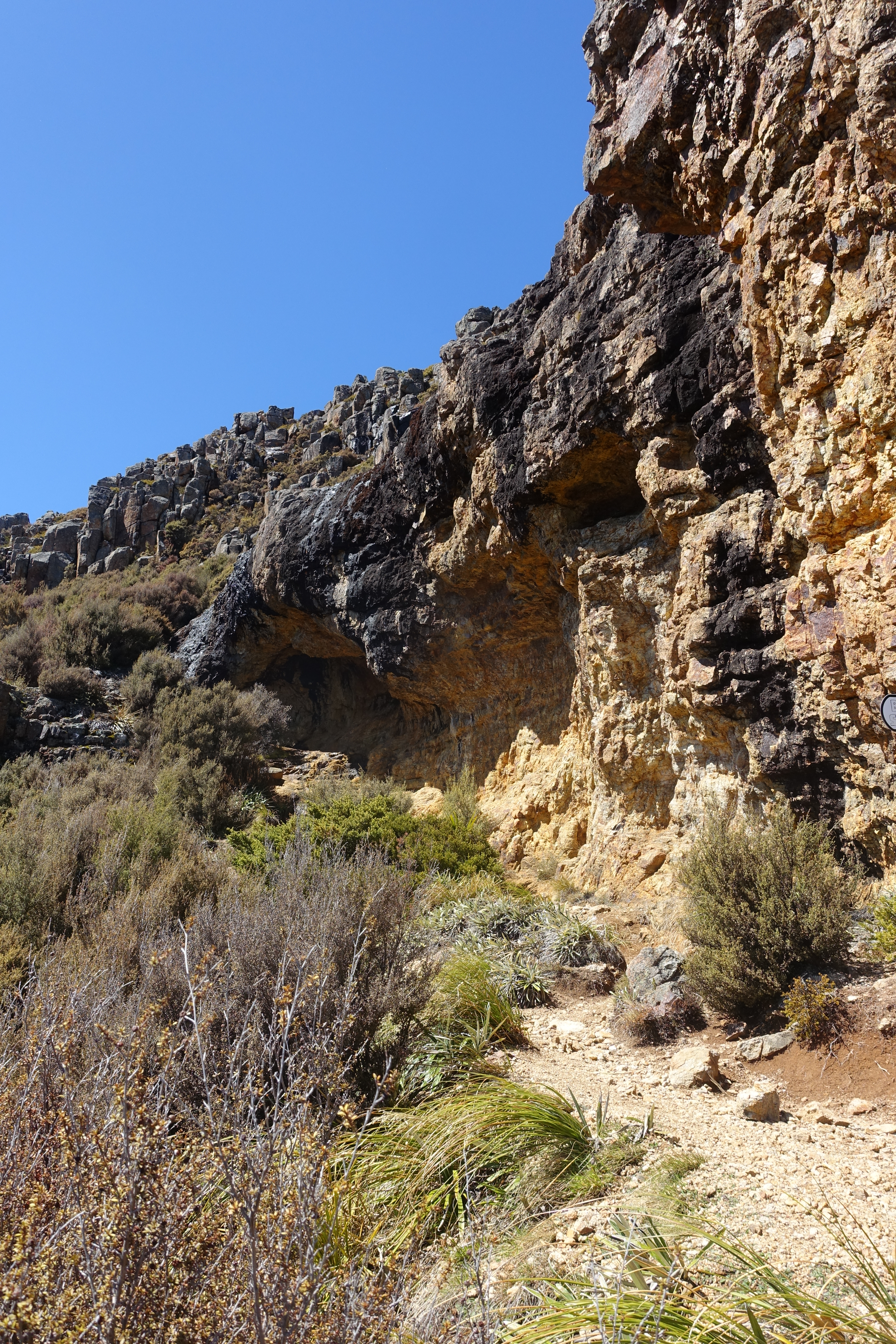
Mt Somers Track at the Bus Stop Overhang

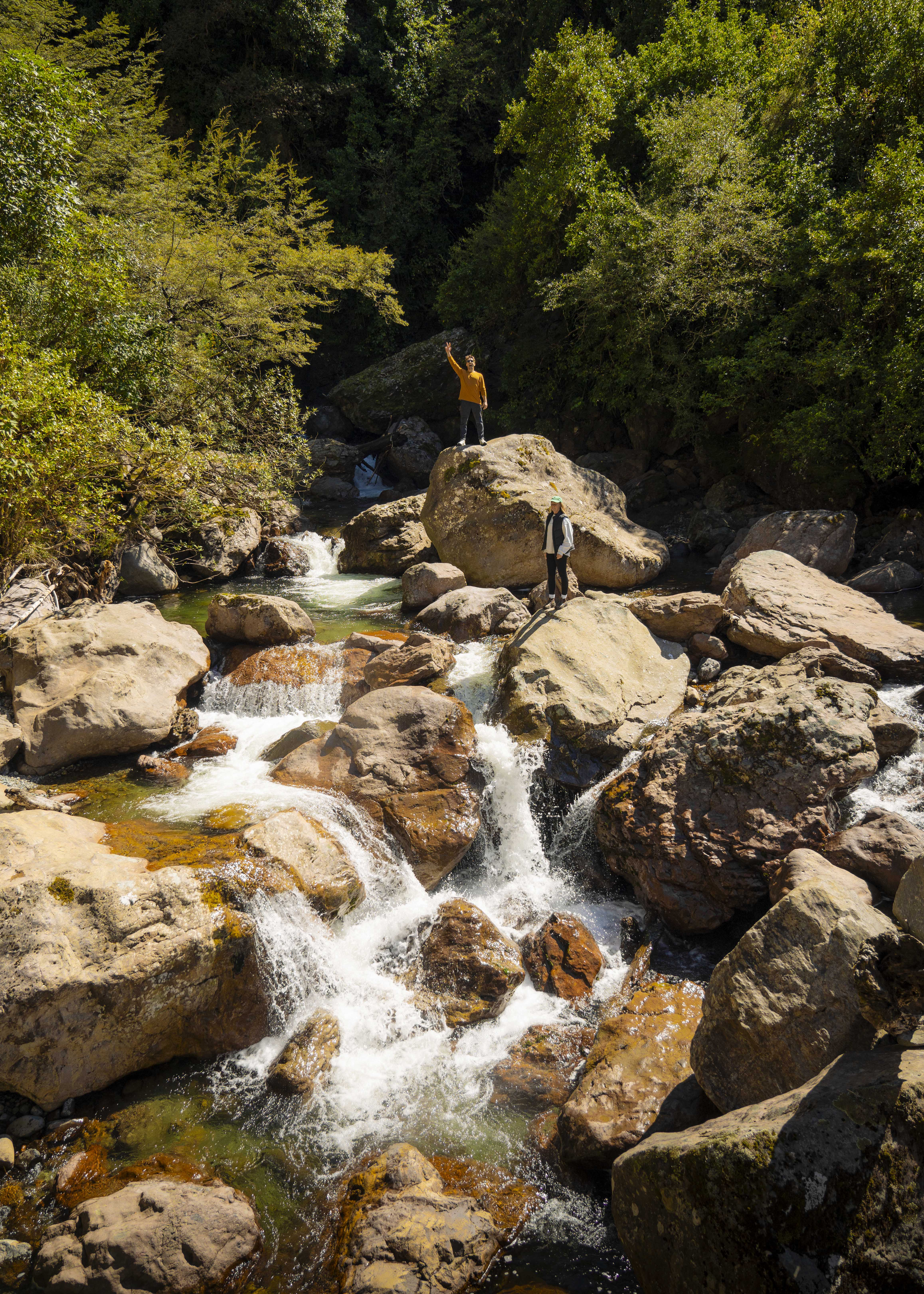
Sharplin Falls
