= Greenstreet, New Zealand =

Locality near Ashburton, New Zealand

Coordinates: 43.816°S 171.678°E

Greenstreet is a rural suburb in the Ashburton District of Canterbury, New Zealand. It lies northwest of Ashburton, near Winchmore and Westerfield, between both the north and south branches of the Ashburton River, which merge at the southernmost point of the suburb. The locality is headed by the Greenstreet Ashburton Forks Domain Board. Named after Charles H. Greenstreet, it is 3,237 hectares (8,000 acres) in area, consisting mostly of privately owned farmland.

In 2024, the Greenstreet irrigation channel faced lower flow rates than usual, leading to the loss of aquatic life in both the channel and creek. Greenstreet Creek has since been subject to water consent reviews by Environment Canterbury, in order to preserve the waterway's ecosystem.

== History ==
Greenstreet has had a Presbyterian church since its early settlement. Greenstreet has shared history with neighbouring locality Ashburton Forks, most notably in the naming of Forks' Greenstreet Methodist Church. Between 1876 and 1936, children from Ashburton Forks attended Greenstreet School, before it was adapted into a community hall.
