= Ashburton Forks, New Zealand =

Ashburton Forks
- Locality
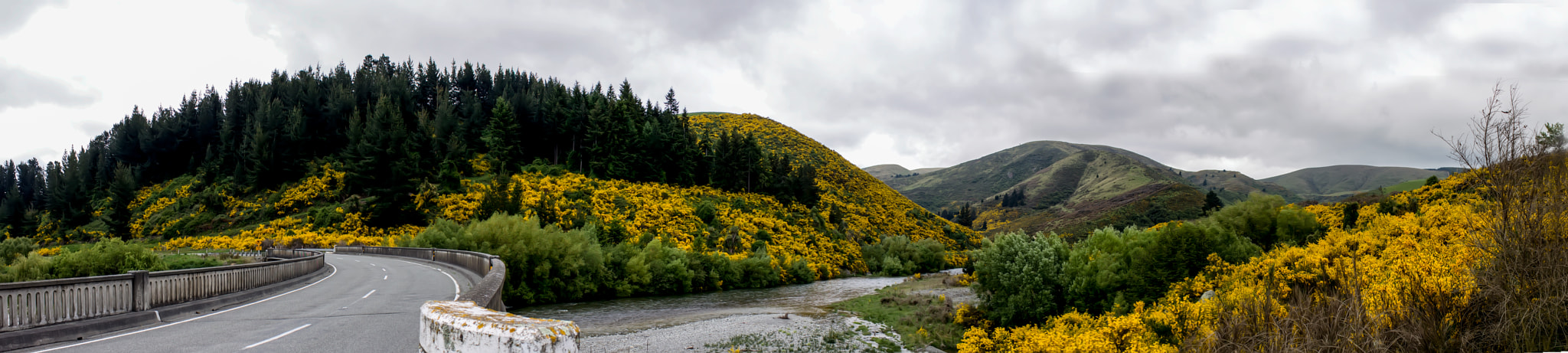
- Thomsons Track crossing the North Branch of Ashburton River / Hakatere
- Interactive map of Ashburton Forks
- Coordinates: 43.729°S 171.573°E
- Country: New Zealand
- Region: Canterbury
- Territorial authority: Ashburton District
- Ward: Western
- Electorates: Rangitata; Te Tai Tonga (Māori)

Government
  - Territorial authority: Ashburton District Council
  - Regional council: Environment Canterbury
  - Mayor of Ashburton: Liz McMillan
  - Rangitata MP: James Meager
  - Te Tai Tonga MP: Tākuta Ferris

Area
  - Total: 44.27 km^{2} (17.09 sq mi)

Population (2023 census)
  - Total: 120
  - Density: 2.7/km^{2} (7.0/sq mi)

Ashburton Forks, formerly known as Spreadeagle, is a defined locality on the Canterbury Plains between the forks of the Ashburton River / Hakatere and within the Ashburton District of the Canterbury Province of New Zealand's South Island. It is approximately 50 km west of Ashburton and about 17 km from the foot of the Southern Alps.

== Early settlers ==
A hotel was established there in the late 1870s and, in 1880, was owned by a Mr Philip Tesch. William Campbell, blacksmith by trade, of Oakfield Demesne, County Donegal established a blacksmith business next to the hotel in 1882 and purchased the nearby Spreadeagle Farm with his wife Mary (née Falloon). The hotel and blacksmith shop burnt down in 1892. William Campbell died a few weeks later from consumption. William Campbell Jnr, son of William and Mary Campbell, continued to work the Spreadeagle Farm until his death in 1936. Mary Campbell was postmistress at Spreadeagle/Ashburton Forks until 1928. She died in 1932 and is buried in the nearby town of Methven.

== Demographics ==
Ashburton Forks locality, which includes Greenstreet, covers 44.27 km^{2} (17.09 sq mi). It is part of the Ashburton Forks statistical area.

Historical population for the locality
Year	Pop.	±% p.a.
2006	108	—
2013	117	+1.15%
2018	111	−1.05%
2023	120	+1.57%

The locality had a population of 120 in the 2023 New Zealand census, an increase of 9 people (8.1%) since the 2018 census, and an increase of 3 people (2.6%) since the 2013 census. There were 60 males and 60 females in 45 dwellings. The median age was 32.8 years (compared with 38.1 years nationally). There were 30 people (25.0%) aged under 15 years, 21 (17.5%) aged 15 to 29, 63 (52.5%) aged 30 to 64, and 6 (5.0%) aged 65 or older.

People could identify as more than one ethnicity. The results were 65.0% European (Pākehā); 10.0% Māori; 22.5% Asian; 5.0% Middle Eastern, Latin American and African New Zealanders (MELAA); and 10.0% other, which includes people giving their ethnicity as "New Zealander". English was spoken by 102.5%, and other languages by 12.5%. The percentage of people born overseas was 32.5, compared with 28.8% nationally.

Religious affiliations were 37.5% Christian, 5.0% Hindu, and 2.5% other religions. People who answered that they had no religion were 50.0%, and 5.0% of people did not answer the census question.

Of those at least 15 years old, 21 (23.3%) people had a bachelor's or higher degree, 51 (56.7%) had a post-high school certificate or diploma, and 21 (23.3%) people exclusively held high school qualifications. The median income was $49,300, compared with $41,500 nationally. 9 people (10.0%) earned over $100,000 compared to 12.1% nationally. The employment status of those at least 15 was 69 (76.7%) full-time, 12 (13.3%) part-time, and 3 (3.3%) unemployed.

=== Ashburton Forks statistical area ===
The statistical area of Ashburton Forks, which also includes Mount Somers, Valetta, Staveley and Alford Forest, covers 859.39 km^{2} (331.81 sq mi) and had an estimated population of 2,610 as of June 2025, with a population density of 3.0 people per km^{2}.

Historical population for the statistical area
Year	Pop.	±% p.a.
2006	1,686	—
2013	2,007	+2.52%
2018	2,214	+1.98%
2023	2,307	+0.83%

The statistical area had a population of 2,307 in the 2023 New Zealand census, an increase of 93 people (4.2%) since the 2018 census, and an increase of 300 people (14.9%) since the 2013 census. There were 1,260 males, 1,038 females, and 9 people of other genders in 945 dwellings. 1.6% of people identified as LGBTIQ+. The median age was 34.6 years (compared with 38.1 years nationally). There were 534 people (23.1%) aged under 15 years, 423 (18.3%) aged 15 to 29, 1,107 (48.0%) aged 30 to 64, and 243 (10.5%) aged 65 or older.

People could identify as more than one ethnicity. The results were 79.1% European (Pākehā); 6.5% Māori; 1.7% Pasifika; 15.2% Asian; 2.1% Middle Eastern, Latin American and African New Zealanders (MELAA); and 4.4% other, which includes people giving their ethnicity as "New Zealander". English was spoken by 96.7%, Māori by 1.4%, Samoan by 0.1%, and other languages by 10.9%. No language could be spoken by 2.5% (e.g. too young to talk). New Zealand Sign Language was known by 0.5%. The percentage of people born overseas was 23.5, compared with 28.8% nationally.

Religious affiliations were 37.5% Christian, 2.2% Hindu, 0.5% Islam, 0.3% Māori religious beliefs, 0.9% Buddhist, 0.3% New Age, 0.1% Jewish, and 1.6% other religions. People who answered that they had no religion were 50.8%, and 6.5% of people did not answer the census question.

Of those at least 15 years old, 384 (21.7%) people had a bachelor's or higher degree, 990 (55.8%) had a post-high school certificate or diploma, and 402 (22.7%) people exclusively held high school qualifications. The median income was $54,300, compared with $41,500 nationally. 198 people (11.2%) earned over $100,000 compared to 12.1% nationally. The employment status of those at least 15 was 1,134 (64.0%) full-time, 294 (16.6%) part-time, and 36 (2.0%) unemployed.

== See also ==
- Ashburton, nearby major town
- Methven, nearby major town
