= Alford Forest =

- Locality
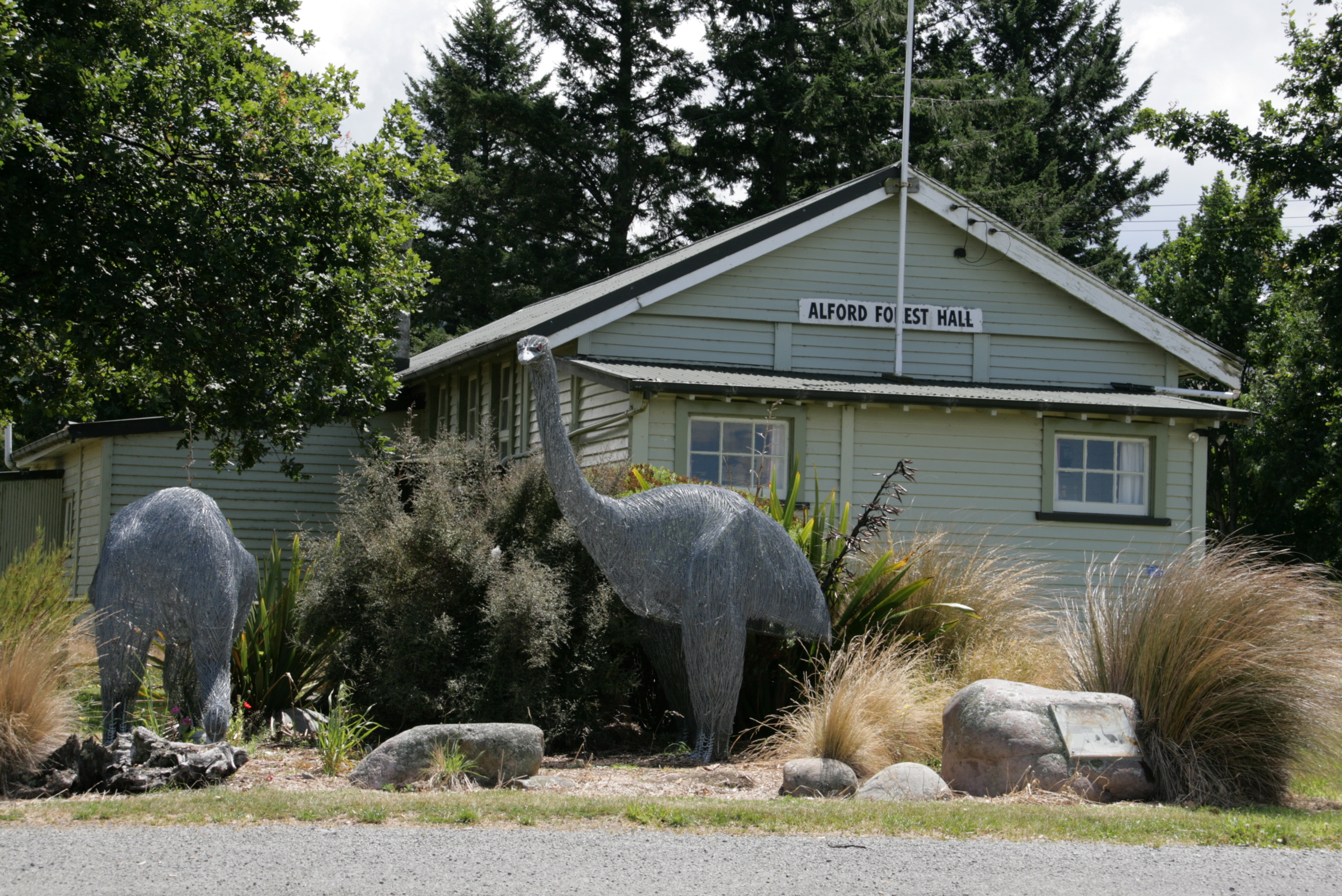
- Alford Forest Hall with Moa
- Interactive map of Alford Forest
- Coordinates: 43.600°S 171.506°E
- Country: New Zealand
- Region: Canterbury
- Territorial authority: Ashburton District
- Ward: Western
- Electorates: Rangitata; Te Tai Tonga (Māori)

Government
  - Territorial authority: Ashburton District Council
  - Regional council: Environment Canterbury
  - Mayor of Ashburton: Liz McMillan
  - Rangitata MP: James Meager
  - Te Tai Tonga MP: Tākuta Ferris

Area
  - Total: 62.97 km^{2} (24.31 sq mi)

Population (2023 census)
  - Total: 180
  - Density: 2.9/km^{2} (7.4/sq mi)

Alford Forest is a location in Ashburton District, Canterbury, New Zealand.

Alford Forest was named after Lord Alford, a member of the Canterbury Association.

In 1883, stones found in Alford Forest were identified as diamonds, leading to a brief "diamond rush" in the area, but the "diamonds" were eventually shown to be worthless crystals.

== Demographics ==
Alford Forest covers 62.97 km^{2} (24.31 sq mi). It is part of the Ashburton Forks statistical area

Historical population
Year	Pop.	±% p.a.
2006	138	—
2013	165	+2.59%
2018	171	+0.72%
2023	180	+1.03%

Alford Forest had a population of 180 in the 2023 New Zealand census, an increase of 9 people (5.3%) since the 2018 census, and an increase of 15 people (9.1%) since the 2013 census. There were 102 males, 81 females, and 3 people of other genders in 72 dwellings. 1.7% of people identified as LGBTIQ+. The median age was 32.8 years (compared with 38.1 years nationally). There were 48 people (26.7%) aged under 15 years, 33 (18.3%) aged 15 to 29, 90 (50.0%) aged 30 to 64, and 9 (5.0%) aged 65 or older.

People could identify as more than one ethnicity. The results were 71.7% European (Pākehā), 5.0% Māori, 5.0% Pasifika, 16.7% Asian, and 8.3% other, which includes people giving their ethnicity as "New Zealander". English was spoken by 98.3%, Māori by 1.7%, and other languages by 18.3%. No language could be spoken by 3.3% (e.g. too young to talk). New Zealand Sign Language was known by 1.7%. The percentage of people born overseas was 35.0, compared with 28.8% nationally.

Religious affiliations were 36.7% Christian, 6.7% Hindu, 1.7% Māori religious beliefs, 1.7% Buddhist, and 1.7% other religions. People who answered that they had no religion were 45.0%, and 8.3% of people did not answer the census question.

Of those at least 15 years old, 21 (15.9%) people had a bachelor's or higher degree, 81 (61.4%) had a post-high school certificate or diploma, and 30 (22.7%) people exclusively held high school qualifications. The median income was $55,500, compared with $41,500 nationally. 15 people (11.4%) earned over $100,000 compared to 12.1% nationally. The employment status of those at least 15 was 87 (65.9%) full-time, 21 (15.9%) part-time, and 3 (2.3%) unemployed.
