= Staveley, New Zealand =

Staveley
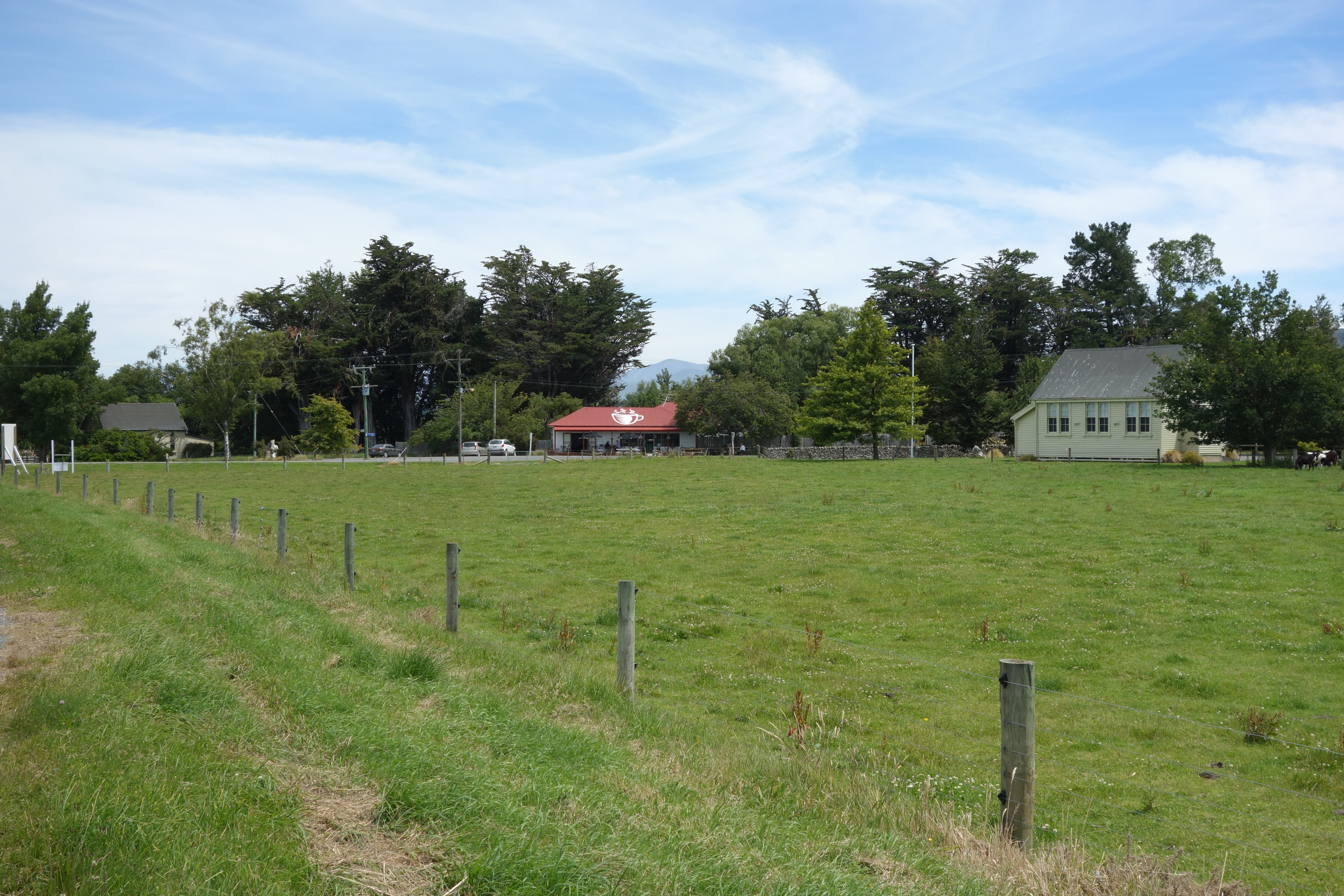
- Staveley church (left), store, and the former Springburn School (relocated in 1996)
- Interactive map of Staveley
- Coordinates: 43°39′S 171°26′E
- Country: New Zealand
- Region: Canterbury
- Territorial authority: Ashburton District

Population (2023 census)
  - Total: 219
- Postcode: 7771
- Area code: 03

Staveley is a small township in the Ashburton District, Canterbury, New Zealand.

== Geography ==
Staveley is named for Robert Staveley, who was a runholder in the area and who had his farm in this location. Staveley is located on the Inland Scenic Route, which is the former State Highway 72. Staveley is located on the Canterbury Plains, in the foothills of the Southern Alps. Adjacent localities are Bushside to the north-east, Springburn to the south-east, and Buccleuch to the south, all between 2 and 4 kilometres (1.2 and 2.5 mi) away. Springburn was the terminus of the Mount Somers Branch from 1889 to 1957.

== Town facilities ==
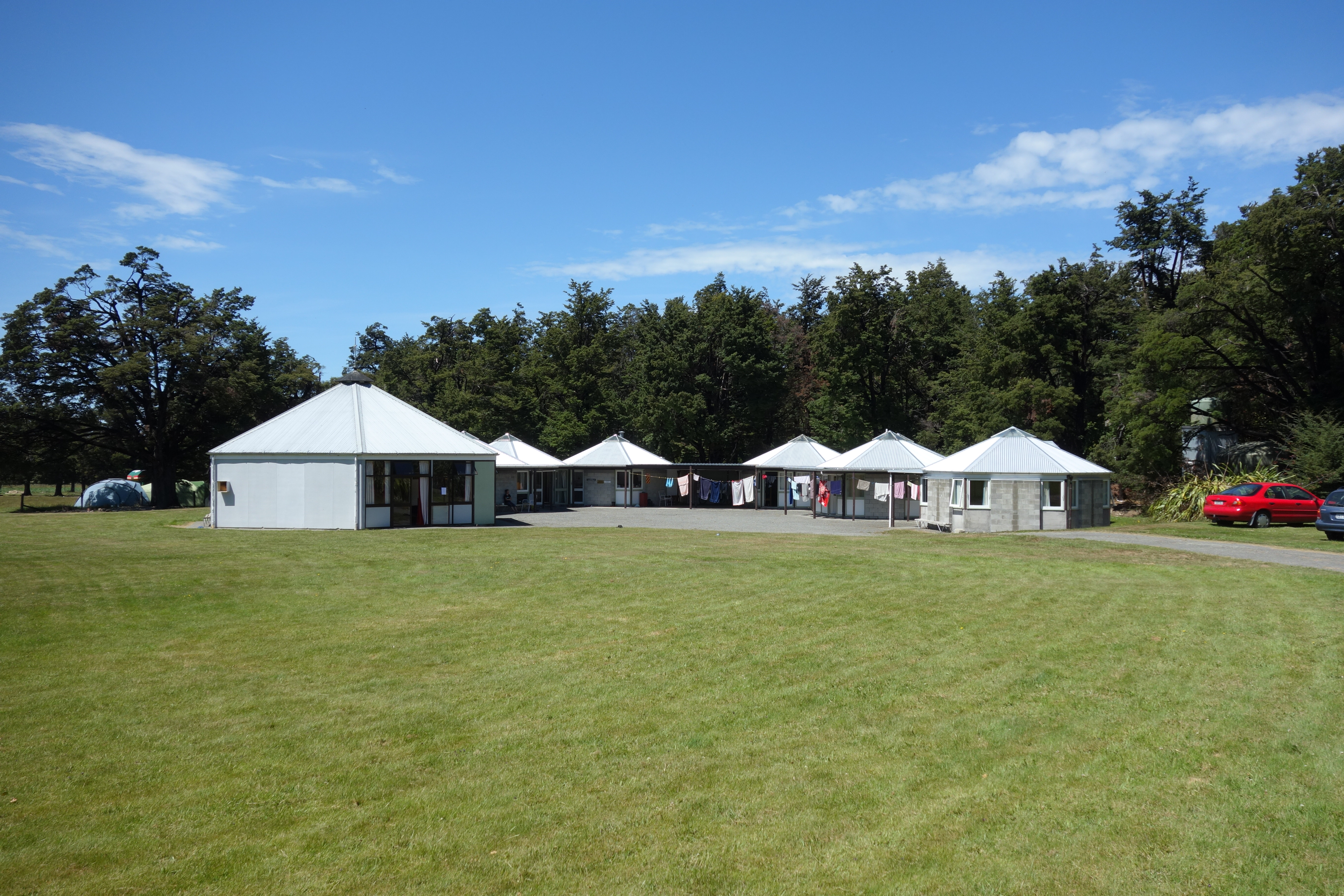
Staveley Camp

In the centre of the township, there is a shop and cafe, an old school that now functions as a museum, a small church, a hall, and a small number of houses. The museum holds photos and artefacts of settlements in the vicinity of Mount Somers / Te Kiekie, a peak of 1,687 metres (5,535 ft) that is the backdrop to this part of the Canterbury Plains.

Staveley Camp is located on Sawmill Road and is available to groups only. The facility is owned by the Mid Canterbury District Bible group, who purchased the site in 1959 and constructed buildings (bunk houses, a kitchen, and meeting rooms) in 1971.

== Demographics ==
Staveley locality covers 82.76 km^{2} (31.95 sq mi). It is part of the Ashburton Forks statistical area.

Historical population
Year	Pop.	±% p.a.
2006	174	—
2013	213	+2.93%
2018	219	+0.56%
2023	219	+0.00%

Stavely had a population of 219 in the 2023 New Zealand census, unchanged since the 2018 census, and an increase of 6 people (2.8%) since the 2013 census. There were 117 males, 102 females, and 3 people of other genders in 90 dwellings. 2.7% of people identified as LGBTIQ+. There were 45 people (20.5%) aged under 15 years, 39 (17.8%) aged 15 to 29, 99 (45.2%) aged 30 to 64, and 39 (17.8%) aged 65 or older.

People could identify as more than one ethnicity. The results were 89.0% European (Pākehā); 5.5% Māori; 4.1% Asian; 5.5% Middle Eastern, Latin American and African New Zealanders (MELAA); and 2.7% other, which includes people giving their ethnicity as "New Zealander". English was spoken by 97.3%, Māori by 4.1%, and other languages by 9.6%. No language could be spoken by 2.7% (e.g. too young to talk). The percentage of people born overseas was 17.8, compared with 28.8% nationally.

Religious affiliations were 37.0% Christian, and 4.1% Buddhist. People who answered that they had no religion were 54.8%, and 5.5% of people did not answer the census question.

Of those at least 15 years old, 42 (24.1%) people had a bachelor's or higher degree, 105 (60.3%) had a post-high school certificate or diploma, and 33 (19.0%) people exclusively held high school qualifications. 18 people (10.3%) earned over $100,000 compared to 12.1% nationally. The employment status of those at least 15 was 105 (60.3%) full-time, 27 (15.5%) part-time, and 3 (1.7%) unemployed.

== Attractions ==
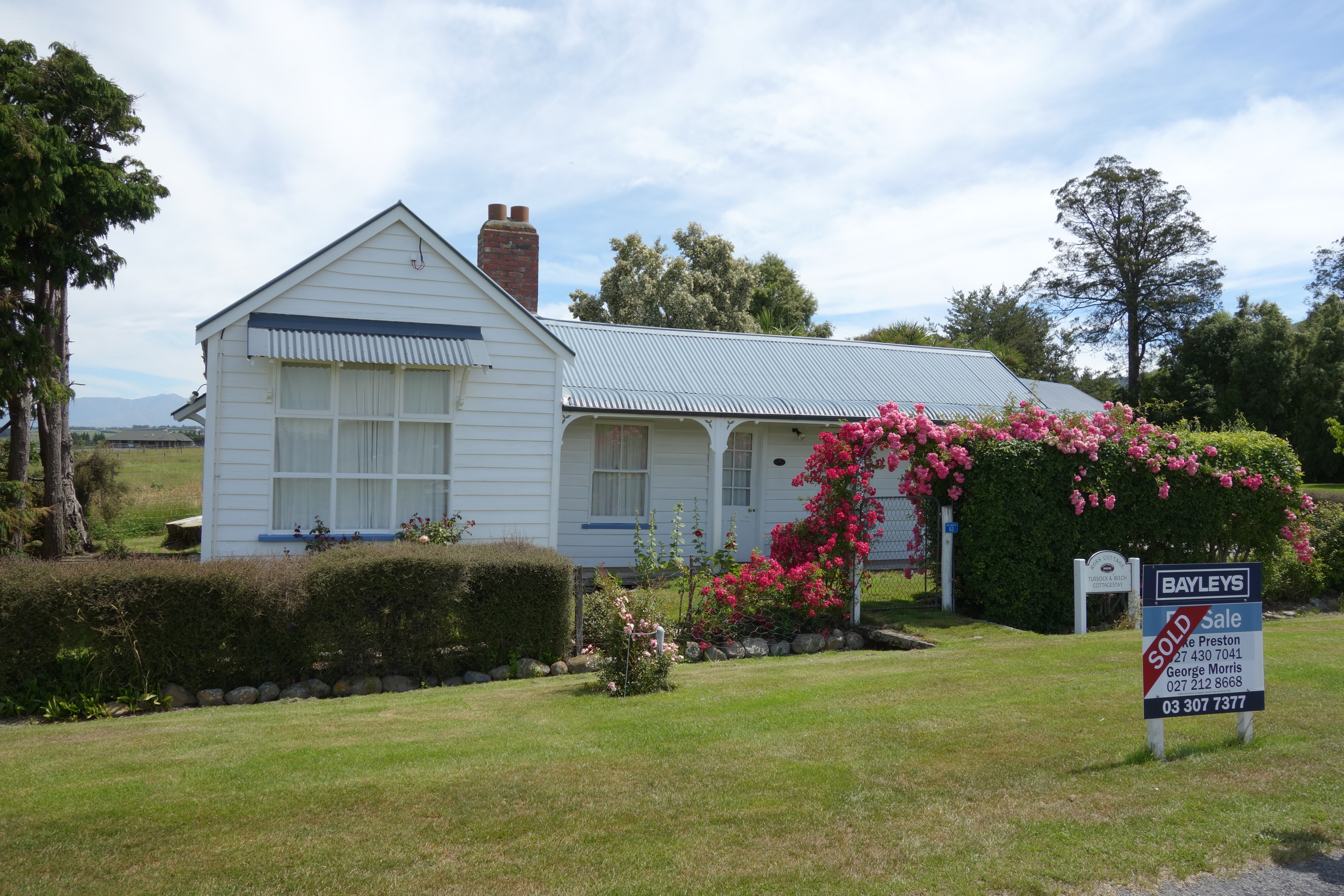
Ross Cottage on Flynns Road

In 1949, locals built a natural ice rink. On busy days, the facility has hundreds of visitors.

Staveley has two historic lime kilns. The older one, believed to have been constructed prior to 1890, was damaged in the 2010 Canterbury earthquake and has since been closed. The other one was built in 1898 and can be visited by the public, with sign posts in Staveley giving directions to the site.

Ross Cottage at 63 Flynns Road is a historic cottage. In 1990, it was registered by the New Zealand Historic Places Trust (since renamed to Heritage New Zealand) as a Category II structure with registration number 5121.
