= Hynman =

Hynman is a given name. Notable persons with that name include:

- Edmund Henry Hynman Allenby, 1st Viscount Allenby (1861–1936), British soldier and administrator
- Michael Jaffray Hynman Allenby, 3rd Viscount Allenby (1931–2014), British politician and hereditary peer

== See also ==
- Hahnemann
- Hanneman
- Hanoman
- Hanuman (disambiguation)
- Honeyman (disambiguation)
- Heineman
- Heinemann (disambiguation)
- Heinman (disambiguation)
- Heinmann (disambiguation)
- Henman
- Hennenman
- Heynemann
- Honyman
- Hyneman
