= Honyman =

Honyman is a surname. Notable persons with that surname include:

- Andrew Honeyman a.k.a. Andrew Honyman (died 1676), Scottish priest, Bishop of Orkney 1664–1676
- John Honyman (1613–1636), English actor
- Sir William Honyman, 1st Baronet (1756–1835), also known as Lord Armadale, Scottish landowner and judge from Orkney
- George Honyman (1819–1875), English judge
- Robert Honyman (Royal Navy officer) (c.1765–1848), Royal Navy Admiral, Member of Parliament (MP) for Orkney and Shetland 1796–1806
- Robert Honyman (British Army officer) (c.1781–1808), Lt Colonel in the Army, MP for Orkney and Shetland 1806–07
- Sir Richard Honyman, 2nd Baronet (1787–1842), MP for Orkney and Shetland 1812–18

== See also ==
- Honeyman (disambiguation)
- Honyman baronets
