= Richard Honyman =

Scottish official of the British East India Company and Member of Parliament (1787-1842)

Sir Richard Bempdé Johnstone Honyman 2nd Baronet
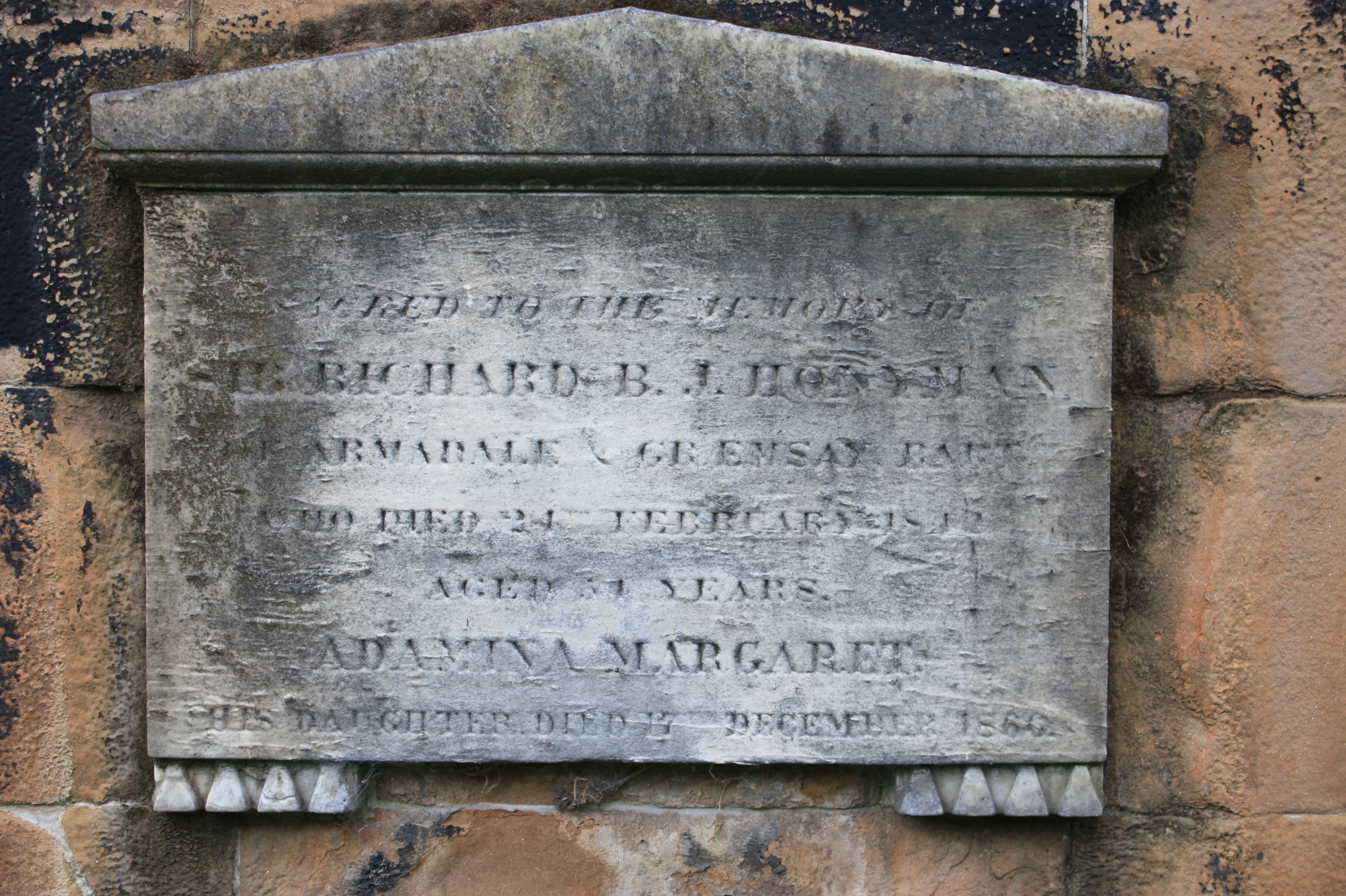
- The grave of Sir Richard Honyman, St Cuthbert's churchyard, Edinburgh

Member of Parliament for Orkney and Shetland
- In office 1812–1818
- Preceded by: Malcolm Laing
- Succeeded by: George Dundas

Personal details
- Born: 4 May 1787
- Died: 23 February 1842 (aged 54)
- Resting place: St Cuthbert's churchyard, Edinburgh
- Party: Whig
- Spouse: Elizabeth Campbell (m. 1825)
- Children: 1 daughter
- Parents: Sir William Honyman (father); Mary Macqueen (mother)
- Relatives: Lord Braxfield (maternal grandfather); Robert Honyman (brother); Ord Honyman (brother); Robert Honyman (uncle)
- Education: Eton College

Sir Richard Bempdé Johnstone Honyman, 2nd Baronet (4 May 1787 – 23 February 1842) was a Scottish official of the British East India Company who served for six years in the House of Commons as the Member of Parliament (MP) for Orkney and Shetland.

== Early life ==
Honyman was the second son of Sir William Honyman, 1st Baronet, SCJ (Lord Armadale), of Armadale in Sutherland and Graemsay in Orkney. His mother Mary was a daughter of the notorious judge Lord Braxfield. The family claimed maternal descent from Sir Robert Stewart, an illegitimate son of King James V of Scotland.

He was educated in England at Eton, and in 1806 he joined the British East India Company as a writer (junior clerk). After several promotions he became deputy commercial resident in Ramnad in 1809 and returned to Britain in 1811. He finally left the East India Company in 1816.

== Career ==
Honyman's father Sir William had large landholdings in Orkney, where he had exerted significant influence on the parliamentary representation since the 1780s. Sir William's brother Robert Honyman (c. 1765–1848) had been returned as Orkney's MP from 1796 to 1806, when he was succeeded by Sir William's oldest son Colonel Robert Honyman until 1807. The Colonel had died of fever in Jamaica in 1808, and when Sir William's negotiations secured the seat for his family again at the 1812 general election, Richard Honyman enjoyed the support of the outgoing Whig MP Malcolm Laing. Honyman won eight of the twelve votes cast.

He is not known to have spoken in Parliament, and was not a frequent attender in the Commons. He initially voted with the Whigs, but by 1813 Sir William was reported to have settled his differences with Henry Dundas's son Robert Dundas, 2nd Viscount Melville who was by then First Lord of the Admiralty in the government of Lord Liverpool. Thereafter Richard voted with the Tories, and at the 1818 general election he was defeated by 12 votes to 19 by the Whig candidate Royal Navy Captain George Dundas. The Balfour, Baikie and Traill families of Orkney had agreed to end the three-decade Honyman hegemony. They allied themselves with the Dundas of Kerse (descendants of Thomas Dundas of Fingask, unrelated to the Lords Melville) who the Honymans had displaced in the 1780s.

The alliance faltered at the 1820 election, when objections were raised to the age of the 70-year-old Whig candidate John Balfour, and to the lack of consultation before his nomination. Honyman was nominated again, by Alexander Henderson of Stempster and seconded by Gilbert Traill; but Balfour won the seat by 19 votes to Honyman's 14.

Sir William Honyman died on 5 January 1825. Due to the death of Colonel Robert, Richard's elder brother, in 1808, Richard was thereby the oldest surviving son and succeeded to his father's baronetcy and estates.

== Family ==
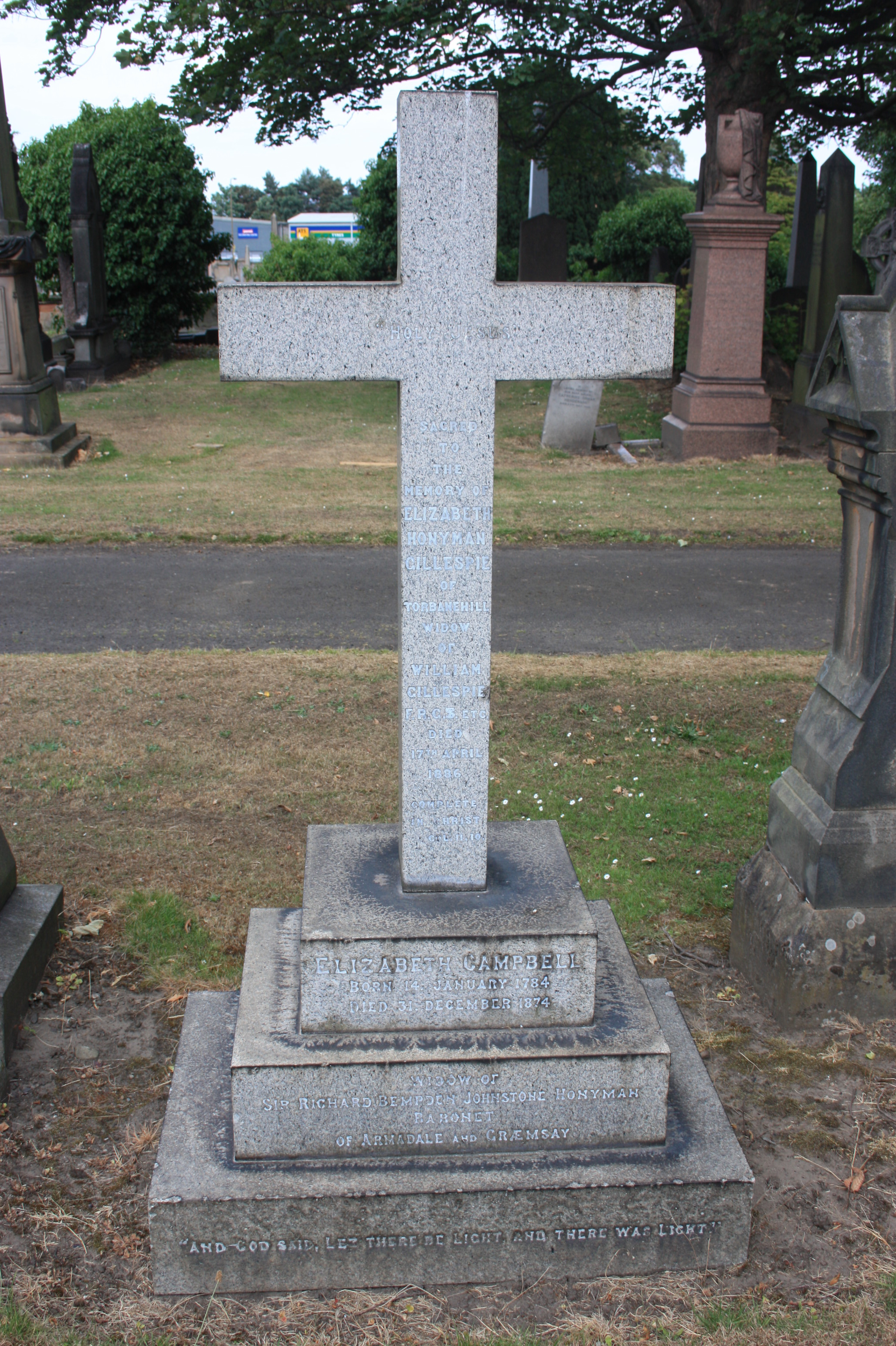
The grave of Lady Elizabeth Campbell Honyman, Rosebank Cemetery, Edinburgh

Honyman married Elizabeth Campbell (1784-1874), with whom he had one daughter. Elizabeth is buried in Rosebank Cemetery in north Edinburgh.

He died on 23 February 1842, and having no male heir the baronetcy passed to his father's second surviving son Ord (1794–1863).

Richard Honyman is buried against the eastern outer wall of the southern section of St Cuthbert's churchyard in Edinburgh. The marble monument is eroded, and its legibility is fading.

== Arms ==
Coat of arms of Richard Honyman
Crest An arrow in pale point downwards Or feathered Argent. Escutcheon Argent on a bend engrailed Gules a bendlet of the field. Supporters Two lions rampant guardant Proper. Motto Progredere Ne Regredere (Advance, Recede Not)

Parliament of the United Kingdom
Preceded by Malcolm Laing	Member of Parliament for Orkney and Shetland; 1812 – 1818	Succeeded by George Dundas
Baronetage of the United Kingdom
Preceded by William Honyman	Baronet (of Armadale); 1825 – 1842	Succeeded by Ord John Honyman
