= Heimann =

Heimann is a surname. Notable people with the surname include:

- Aage Heimann (1900–1956), Danish field hockey player, competed in the 1928 Summer Olympics
- Andreas Heimann (born 1992), German chessplayer
- Betsy Faith Heimann, costume designer in Hollywood
- Caja Heimann (1918–1988), Danish film actress
- Eduard Heimann (1889–1967), German economist and social scientist
- Gerhard Heimann (1934–2017), German politician
- Hugo Heimann (1859–1951), German publisher politician
- John G. Heimann, American Comptroller of the Currency from 1977 to 1981
- Nadine Heimann, American actress
- Niclas Heimann (born 1991), German footballer
- Rolf Heimann (born 1940), Australian author, cartoonist and illustrator
- Sherry Heimann (born 1944), American former actress and film studio executive
- Heimann Joseph Michael (1792–1846), Hebrew bibliographer born at Hamburg
- Heimann Hariton Tiktin (1850–1936), Silesian-born Romanian Jewish linguist and academic

== See also ==
- Heidemann
- Heilmann
- Heiman
- Heinemann (disambiguation)
- Heinzmann
- Heitmann
- Heitzmann
