= Robert Honyman =

Robert Honyman or Honeyman may refer to:

- Robert Honyman (Royal Navy officer) (c.1765–1848), Royal Navy Admiral, Member of Parliament (MP) for Orkney and Shetland 1796–1806
- Robert Honyman (British Army officer) (c.1781–1808), lieutenant colonel in the Army, MP for Orkney and Shetland 1806–1807

== See also ==
- Honyman
- Honyman baronets
