= Honeyman =

Honeyman may refer to:

== People ==
- Aaron Honeyman (born 1972), Australian basketball player
- Andrew Honeyman, Bishop of Orkney 1664–76
- Ben Honeyman (born 1977), Australian former football (soccer) player
- David Honeyman (1817–1889), Scottish-Canadian Presbyterian minister, geologist, teacher, and museum curator
- George Honeyman (born 1994), English footballer
- James Honeyman-Scott (1956–1982), commonly referred to as "Jimmy", English rock guitarist, songwriter
- John Honeyman (1729–1822), American spy and British Loyalist double agent
- John Honeyman (1831–1914), architect, partner in Honeyman and Keppie
- Katrina Honeyman (1950–2011), British economic historian
- Nan Wood Honeyman (1881 – 1970), American politician
- Tom Honeyman (1891–1971), director of the Glasgow Art Gallery
- Victoria Honeyman (born 1978), British politics academic

== Places ==
- Honeyman Island, Nunavut, Canada
- Jessie M. Honeyman Memorial State Park, Florence, Oregon, USA

== Other uses ==
- Honeyman: Live 1973, album by Tim Buckley
- "Honeyman", a song written and sung by Cat Stevens and Elton John release on the Cat Stevens box set

== See also ==
- Honyman
