= William Honyman, Lord Armadale =

Scottish landowner and judge (1756–1835)

Sir William Honyman, 1st Baronet (December 1756 – 5 June 1835), also known by his judicial title Lord Armadale, was a Scottish landowner, and judge from Orkney. On his lands in Sutherland he was one of the first landlords to evict tenants in order to create sheep farms, a process which grew to become the Highland Clearances.

He used his political power in Orkney to return as Member of Parliament (MP) for Orkney and Shetland first his brother Robert, then his son Robert, and finally a younger son Richard.

== Early life ==
His father, Patrick Honyman of Graemsay, was a great-grandson of Andrew Honyman, a 17th-century Bishop of Orkney. The family claimed maternal descent from Sir Robert Stewart, an illegitimate son of King James V of Scotland.

His mother Margaret MacKay, was the elder daughter of Captain. John MacKay, 5th Laird of Strathy (died 1783) and descendant of John MacKay, 2nd Lord Reay & 15th Chief of Clan MacKay (c1612-80)

== Legal career ==
Honyman was called to the bar in 1777, and became Sheriff-Depute of Lanarkshire in July 1786. As Sheriff, he was involved in the investigations into the political reformer Thomas Muir of Huntershill, interrogating potential witnesses for Muir's show trial on a charge of sedition before the Lord Justice Clerk (Scotland's most senior judge) Lord Braxfield, who was also Honyman's father-in-law.

Muir's admission to the Faculty of Advocates and his appointment as Sheriff were both aided by the support of Sir Lawrence Dundas, who had bought the earldom of Orkney and lordship of Zetland from James Douglas, 14th Earl of Morton and become known as the "Dundas of Kerse". In the 1770s, the Honymans supported Dundas and his son Colonel Thomas Dundas, who was the Member of Parliament (MP) for Orkney and Shetland in the 1770s.

In February 1797 he was appointed as a judge in succession to Lord Dreghorn. He joined the Lords of Justiciary in June 1799 after the promotion of Lord Eskgrove, and in 1804 was made a baronet, taking the territorial designation of Armadale, after his lands on the north coast of Sutherland. He resigned from his judicial posts in 1811 and retired to Smyllum Park, his estate in Lanarkshire.

== Orkney ==
Despite his judicial career, Honyman actively excised his political strength in Orkney. The Kerse control of Scottish parliamentary seats was being challenged by Henry Dundas (later Lord Melville), and in the 1780s the Honymans transferred their support to Henry Dundas. In 1790, William Honyman helped secure the election in Orkney of John Balfour, who defeated Sir Lawrence's son Thomas in a contested election.

By the 1796 election, Honyman hoped that his son Robert, then only 15 years old, would take the seat when he was old enough. After prolonged negotiations with Balfour, Honyman installed his half-brother Commander Robert to keep it in the family until young Robert was eligible.

Despite growing challenges to Honyman's hegemony, young Robert (by now a 25-year-old Major in the 93rd Foot) was returned for Orkney in 1806. However, shortly after his election the new MP was promoted to Lieutenant-Colonel in the 18th Foot, and never voted or spoke in the House of Commons. By the 1807 election, Honyman supported the election of his rival Malcolm Laing. Laing's health declined, and at the 1812 election Honyman's rivals divided, allowing the election of Honyman's younger son Richard (Robert having died of fever in Jamaica in 1808). However, his rivals met in February 1818 and agreed to combine against the Honymans. Thereafter, the Orkney seat was alternated between the Balfour, Dundas and Laing families.

He also had some influence in the Parliamentary Burgh of Kirkwall, albeit less than Laing.

== Sutherland ==
In 1790 Honyman purchased lands at Strathy on the north coast of Sutherland from his maternal grandfather Captain John Mackay. The estate included Armadale, which Honyman later took as his judicial title.

Honyman was one of the first landlords in the north of Scotland to recognise the higher returns available from sheep farming, and became one of the pioneers of the Highland Clearances in which the people were driven off their land. Honyman divided his estate into three, and by 1800 he had cleared the people from the valley of Armadale to a new coastal settlement, establishing a new Armadale Sheep Farm on an area 6 miles by 4. The estate was sold in 1813 to the Marquess of Stafford (later 1st Duke of Sutherland), who continued the clearance.

== West Lothian ==
Also in 1790, Honyman purchased lands at Barbauchlaw in West Lothian, which he renamed Armadale.

== Family ==
In 1777 Honyman married Mary McQueen, the daughter of Lord Braxfield, by whom he had at least five sons and four daughters. The two oldest sons joined the British Army, Patrick serving in the 28th Light Dragoons, and Robert becoming a Lieutenant colonel of the 18th Regiment of Foot.

In 1820, John Wade's The Black Book: Or, Corruption Unmasked collated data on pensions paid out of the civil list of England and the heritable revenue of Scotland. Wade revealed that in Sir William's pensions as a retired amounted judge of £1,800 per annum (equivalent to £150,000 in 2025). This sum was revised by the 1831 edition of Wade's book to £1,950, when Wade noted that Lady Mary Honyman had in February 1814 been awarded a pension of £137 per year, followed in June 1815 by further pensions of £37 for each of their for daughters: Mary, Catherine, Margaret and Jemima.

Wade singled out the Honymans for special criticism. He noted that the family "possessed a considerable estate ... how they came to be chargeable on the civil list is most extraordinary." The Scottish Reformers Gazette said "we can only account for their appearance here, by recollecting that Sir William Honyman, in 1793, then Mr Honyman, Sheriff of Lanarkshire, was the most active in hunting for evidence against Thomas Muir of Huntershill".

== Arms ==
Coat of arms of William Honyman, Lord Armadale
Crest An arrow in pale point downwards Or feathered Argent. Escutcheon Argent on a bend engrailed Gules a bendlet of the field. Supporters Two lions rampant guardant Proper. Motto Progredere Ne Regredere (Advance, Recede Not)

Baronetage of the United Kingdom
New creation	Baronet (of Armadale); 1804–1825	Succeeded by Richard Honyman
