= Coton, Shropshire =

Village in Shropshire, England

Coordinates: 52.908°N 2.699°W

Coton
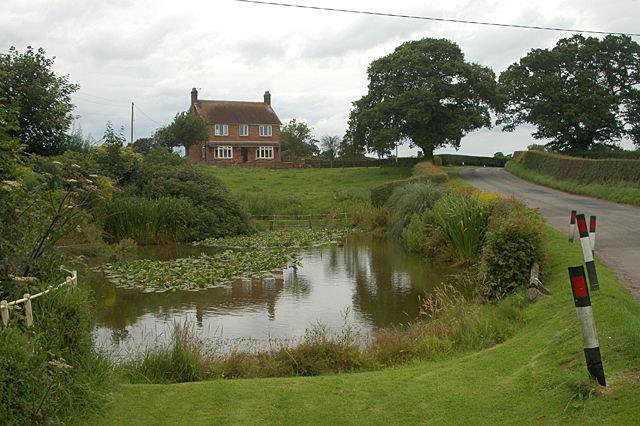
- Roadside pond in Coton near Hollinwood

- Location within Shropshire
- OS grid reference: SJ529347
- Civil parish: Wem Rural
- Unitary authority: Shropshire
- Ceremonial county: Shropshire
- Region: West Midlands
- Country: England
- Sovereign state: United Kingdom
- Post town: WHITCHURCH
- Postcode district: SY13
- Dialling code: 01948
- Police: West Mercia
- Fire: Shropshire
- Ambulance: West Midlands
- UK Parliament: North Shropshire

Coton is a village in Shropshire. It lies near the road from Whitchurch to Wem, about one mile southeast of Hollinwood.

Coton Hall, once home to Viscount Hill, is an important English heritage site. In the early nineteenth century it belonged to Admiral George Bowen but it subsequently passed to the Honyman baronets after Admiral Bowen's youngest daughter, Elizabeth Essex Bowen, married the Scottish baronet Sir Ord John Honyman. Their sons, Sir George Honyman, 4th Baronet (1819–75) and the Rev. Sir William Macdonald Honyman (d. 1911) lived there in succession but they both died without issue and from the Rev. Sir William the estate passed to his niece, Elizabeth Hester Georgina Marie Ord Bearcroft, daughter of the Rev. Thomas Bearcroft (born Thomas Longcroft) of Fitz and his wife, Mary Hester Lilly Rosalie Honyman, sister of Sir George and the Rev. Sir William. As a desirable young heiress, Elizabeth Bearcroft married Captain Robert Charles Dighton Wilson in 1891 and they adopted the additional surname of MacQueen in 1912 when Elizabeth inherited entailed estates in Scotland. The Wilson-MacQueens sold Coton Hall to the wealthy match manufacturer Sir Alexander Maguire, who was living there by 1920 but sold the estate to Viscount Hill in 1924. The house has since been sold out of the Hill family.

The village has a Methodist Chapel, which contained in 2013 a war memorial marble plaque to congregation members who died serving in the First World War. Since then the chapel has closed and in 2022 the managing trustees announced they would put the chapel for sale, its graveyard being closed to new unplanned burials but stipulating the graves and gravestones would not be removed.

== See also ==
- Listed buildings in Wem Rural
