= History of landscape architecture =

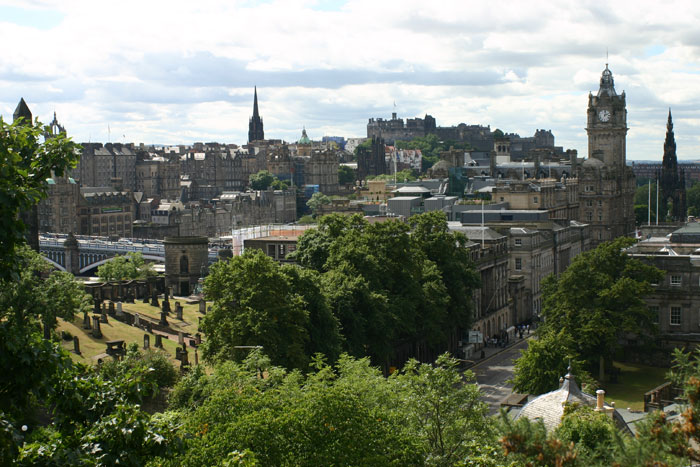
Central Edinburgh, well known to Gilbert Laing Meason is a fine example of the approach to landscape and architectural composition developed during the Scottish Enlightenment period. The circular tower (left central) is the tomb of David Hume, designed by Robert Adam

The discussion of the history of landscape architecture is a complex endeavor as it shares much of its history with that of landscape gardening and architecture, spanning the entirety of man's existence. However, it was not until relatively recent history that the term "landscape architecture" or even "landscape architect" came into common use.

== Earliest history ==
For the period before 1800, the history of landscape architecture, formally landscape gardening, is largely that of master planning and garden design for manor houses, palaces and royal properties, religious complexes, and centers of government. An example is the extensive work by André Le Nôtre for King Louis XIV of France at the Palace of Versailles.

The first person to write of "making" a landscape was Joseph Addison in a series of essays entitled "On the Pleasures of the Imagination" in 1712.

The term landscape architecture was first used by Gilbert Laing Meason in his book On The Landscape Architecture of the Great Painters of Italy (London, 1828). Meason was born in Scotland and did not have the opportunity to visit Italy, but he admired the relationship between architecture and landscape in the great landscape paintings and drew upon Vitruvius' Ten Books on Architecture to find principles and the relationship between built form and natural form. The term was then taken up by John Claudius Loudon and used to describe a specific type of architecture, suited to being placed in designed landscapes. Loudon was admired by the American designer and theorist Andrew Jackson Downing and landscape architecture was the subject of a chapter in Downing's book A Treatise on the Theory and Practice of Landscape Gardening, Adapted to North America (1841).

== First years ==
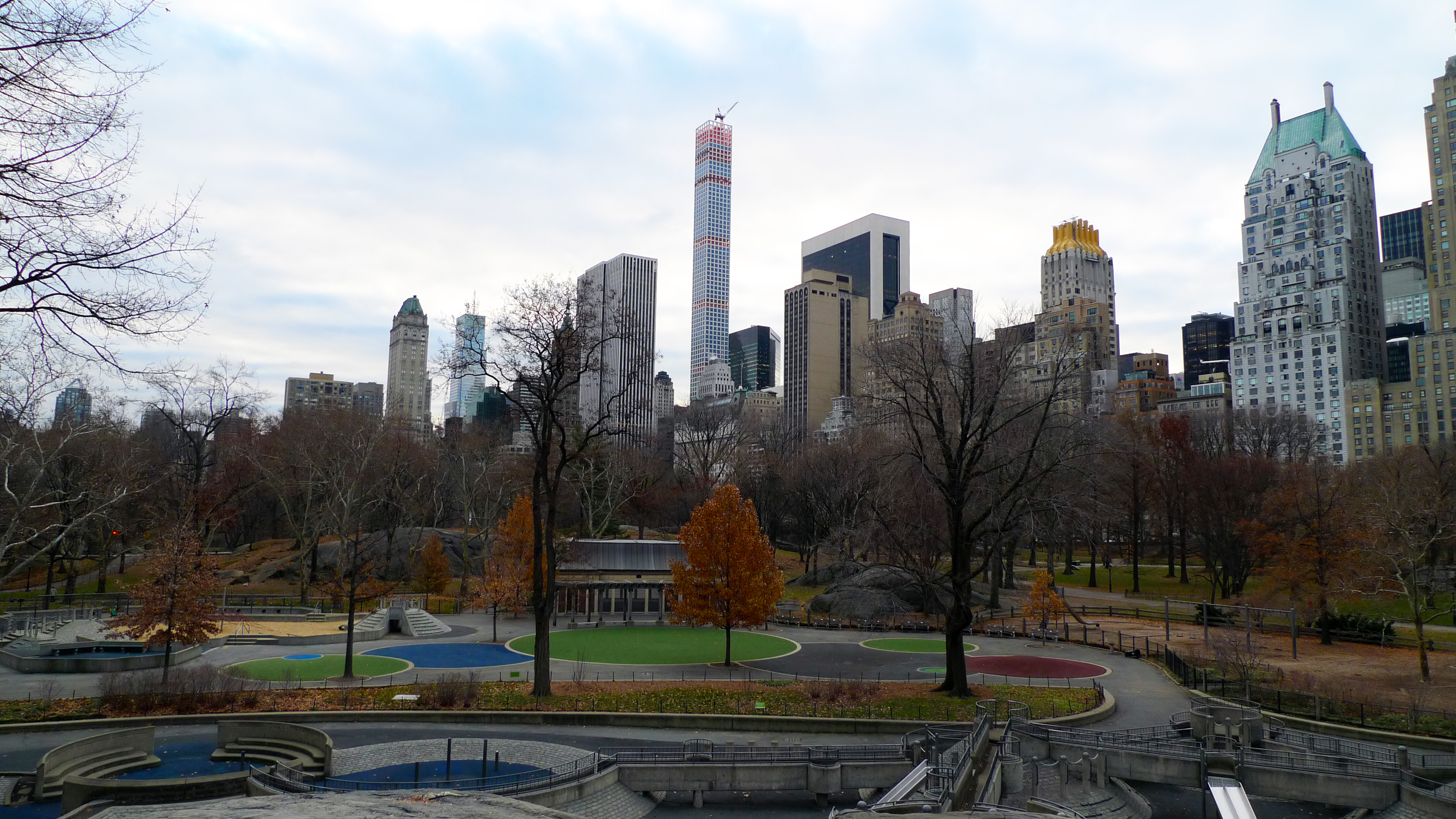
Olmsted used the term 'landscape architecture' describing the whole professional task of designing a composition of planting, landform, water, paving and other structures, using the word for the first time when designing the Central Park.

This led to its adoption by Frederick Law Olmsted and Calvert Vaux. Olmsted and a man named George Oskar gave a different slant to the meaning of 'landscape architecture', using the term to describe the whole professional task of designing a composition of planting, landform, water, paving and other structures. Their first use of the term was in the winning entry for the design of Central Park in New York City. Olmsted and Vaux then in 1863 adopted landscape architect as a professional title and used it to describe their work for the planning of urban park systems. Olmsted's project for the Emerald Necklace in Boston was widely admired and led to the use of landscape architect as a professional title in Europe, initially by Patrick Geddes and Thomas Mawson. Frederick Law Olmsted and Beatrix Farrand, with eight other leading practitioners.

== Modern time ==
Landscape architecture has since become a worldwide profession, submitted for recognition by the International Labour Organization and represented on a world-wide basis by the International Federation of Landscape Architects.

Garrett Eckbo and Dan Kiley were prominent modernist landscape architects in the mid-20th century. Their work is represented by a shift away from what might be termed the wild garden aesthetic of earlier landscape architects influenced by Romantic Naturalism, and toward a more spare and rectilinear aesthetic. Both studied under Warren Manning at Harvard, who in turn had studied under Frederick Law Olmsted.

Several landscape architects practicing in the 1980s and 1990s moved the discipline beyond its roots in High Modernism. These include Martha Schwartz, Peter Walker, and Michael Van Valkenburgh. Starting in the mid-1990s, a new disciplinary shift occurred toward what has been called Landscape urbanism, a term that attempts to merge urban design, infrastructure design and landscape.

=== Publications ===
Three remarkable histories of the landscape architecture profession were published in the 1970s.

A first comprehensive history of landscape architecture, as distinct from the history of gardening was written by Norman T Newton with the title Design on the land: the development of landscape architecture (Belknap/Harvard 1971). The book has 42 chapters. The first three chapters are on Ancient Times, The Middle Ages, and The World of Islam. The last three chapters are on Urban Open-Space Systems, Variations in Professional Practice and the Conservation of Natural Resources. This reflects the development of landscape architecture from a focus on private gardens, in the ancient world, to a focus on the planning and design of public open space in the modern world. Since kings used to be responsible for the provision of public goods (irrigation, streets, town walls, parks and other environmental goods) the distinction between public and private was not quite the same in the ancient world as it is in the modern world.

A second comprehensive history of landscape architecture with the title History of Landscape Architecture was published in 1973 by George B Tobey. It extends from 5000 BC, through the development of agriculture and towns to the design of gardens, parks and garden cities. This represents a broader view of landscape architecture than that of Newton and would have been well suited to Newton's title 'Design on the land'.

A third comprehensive history of landscape architecture was published by Geoffrey and Susan Jellicoe in 1975 with the title The landscape of man: shaping the environment from prehistory to the present day (Thames and Hudson, 1975). The book has 27 chapters and is more comprehensive than its predecessors, geographically, artistically and philosophically. Like Bannister Fletcher's History of Architecture, the book has introductory sections (e.g. on environment, social history, philosophy, expression, architecture, landscape) and then a series of examples with plans and photographs. Many of the examples are parks and gardens but the book also includes the layout of temples, towns, forests and other projects concerned with 'shaping the environment'.

== Related fine arts and representation ==
The fine arts and landscape architecture have been interwoven in the professionals' methods. A history of landscape architecture, including the natural and designed the landscape and of public and private gardens, includes the professional component of artistic and technical representation, which have been responsible for visualizing and communicating – the creative concepts, ideas, designs, options, 'manifested theories', and guiding aesthetic principles – between the landscape architect and the clients, builders, and interested parties.

A few of the media and methods are unchanged, while most have evolved over the centuries to reflect new artistic methods and graphic supplies. Almost timeless are the fine arts media of charcoal sketch, oil paint, watercolor, pen and ink drawing, sculpture, and etching. Those were joined by: print-making; by film photography for prints, slides, and movies; collage and built-up layered images; model making, and other techniques. Since the late 20th century the introduction of computers, numerous formatting uses for scanning and printing, the wide array of options with digital technology for drawing, images and site videos; and the nearly infinite reach of the internet have revolutionized how to explore and interact to share creative intent. These have also facilitated effective communication collaboratively within the project team, clients, and involved people of the world.

=== Related fine arts ===
==== Two-dimensional arts ====
- Printmaking, frescos
- Oil painting, watercolor
- Drawing, sketching

==== Photography ====
- Black-and-white and Color (prints, slides)
- Full spectrum, Ultraviolet, and Infrared (art & site analysis)

==== Digital art ====
- Computer art, Multimedia art, New media art
- Digital art, Digital photography (images, videos)

==== Sculpture ====
- Environmental sculpture
- Sculpture
- Sculpture garden
- social sculpture
- Public art

==== Land or Earth art ====
- Environmental art
- Land art
- Earthworks (art)
- Land Arts of the American West
- Sustainable art

== See also ==
- History of gardening
- Landscape architecture
- Landscape planning
- History of Parks and Gardens of Paris
