= Hinzmann =

Hinzmann is a German surname. Notable people with the surname include:

- Gabriele Hinzmann (born 1947), East German athlete
- Marcy Hinzmann (born 1982), American figure skater
- Tom Hinzmann (born 1996), German politician

== See also ==
- Heinzmann
