= Samuel Laing =

Samuel Laing is the name of:

- Samuel Laing (travel writer) (1780–1868), author of books on Scandinavia and Germany
- Samuel Laing (science writer) (1812–1897), son of the above, a businessman, politician and writer on modern science
