= Robert Baikie =

Scottish politician

Robert Baikie (died 1817) was a Scottish politician from Tankerness and Egilshay in Orkney.

Baikie was the oldest son of James Baikie of Tankerness and his wife Janet, a daughter of William Douglas, and heiress of the Monteiths of Egilshay through her grandfather Alexander. His father was provost of Kirkwall during the Jacobite rising of 1745, and was paid a pension by the Earls of Morton for his support of their electoral interests.

However, in 1766 James Douglas, 14th Earl of Morton sold all his interests in Orkney to Sir Lawrence Dundas. At the 1768 general election Sir Lawrence installed as the Member of Parliament (MP) for Orkney and Shetland his older brother Thomas Dundas, who was returned unopposed. Thomas stood down in 1770, and the following year Thomas's son Captain Thomas Dundas was elected unopposed. He was returned unopposed at the 1774 general election.

However, Sir Lawrence had alienated both the lairds and merchants of Orkney. When he opposed Lord North's government, the Orkney opposition received £300 from secret service funds to support a government candidate. Baikie was chosen to stand, and at the 1780 general election, Baikie was elected as the Member of Parliament (MP) for Orkney and Shetland by 11 votes to the 5 won Sir Lawrence's nephew Charles Dundas. However, Baikie's election had been achieved only by excluding seven supporters of Dundas, and after an election petition the seat was awarded to Dundas on 28 February 1781. Baikie stood again at the 1784, but was defeated by 12 votes to 7 by the returned Colonel Thomas Dundas.

Parliament of Great Britain
Preceded by Thomas Dundas	Member of Parliament for Orkney and Shetland; 1780–1781	Succeeded by Charles Dundas
