= George Dundas (Royal Navy officer) =

English naval officer (1778–1834)

Rear-Admiral The Honourable George Dundas CB
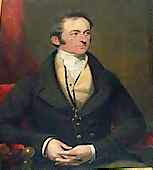
- George Heneage Lawrence Dundas
- Born: 8 September 1778; Upleatham, Yorkshire
- Died: 7 October 1834 (aged 56); Upleatham, Yorkshire
- Military career
- Allegiance: United Kingdom
- Branch: Royal Navy
- Service years: 1800–1834
- Rank: Rear-Admiral
- Commands: First Naval Lord; Comptroller of the Navy; HMS Cameleon; HMS Calpe; HMS Quebec; HMS Euryalus; HMS Edinburgh
- Conflicts: French Revolutionary Wars; War of the Fifth Coalition; War of the Sixth Coalition
- Awards: Companion of the Order of the Bath

Rear-Admiral George Heneage Lawrence Dundas CB (8 September 1778 – 7 October 1834) was a senior officer in the Royal Navy. As a junior officer he came to prominence due to his brave conduct during a fire on the first-rate HMS Queen Charlotte. As a result of this he was appointed to the command of the sixth-rate HMS Calpe in which he took part in the Battle of Algeciras Bay in July 1801 during the French Revolutionary Wars. After serving for four years as Whig Member of Parliament for Richmond, he was given command of the fifth-rate HMS Euryalus and took part in the unsuccessful Walcheren Campaign in July 1809 during the Napoleonic Wars. He transferred to the third-rate HMS Edinburgh and landed troops at Viareggio in Italy in November 1812 later in that War. He went on to be Member of Parliament for Orkney and Shetland and became First Naval Lord in the First Melbourne ministry in August 1834 but died in office just two months later in October 1834.

== Naval career ==
=== Early career ===
Born the fifth son of Thomas Dundas (created Baron Dundas in 1794) by his wife Charlotte Dundas (daughter of William Fitzwilliam, 3rd Earl Fitzwilliam), Dundas became a lieutenant in the Royal Navy in 1797 and served for several years with the Mediterranean Fleet.

=== HMS Queen Charlotte ===
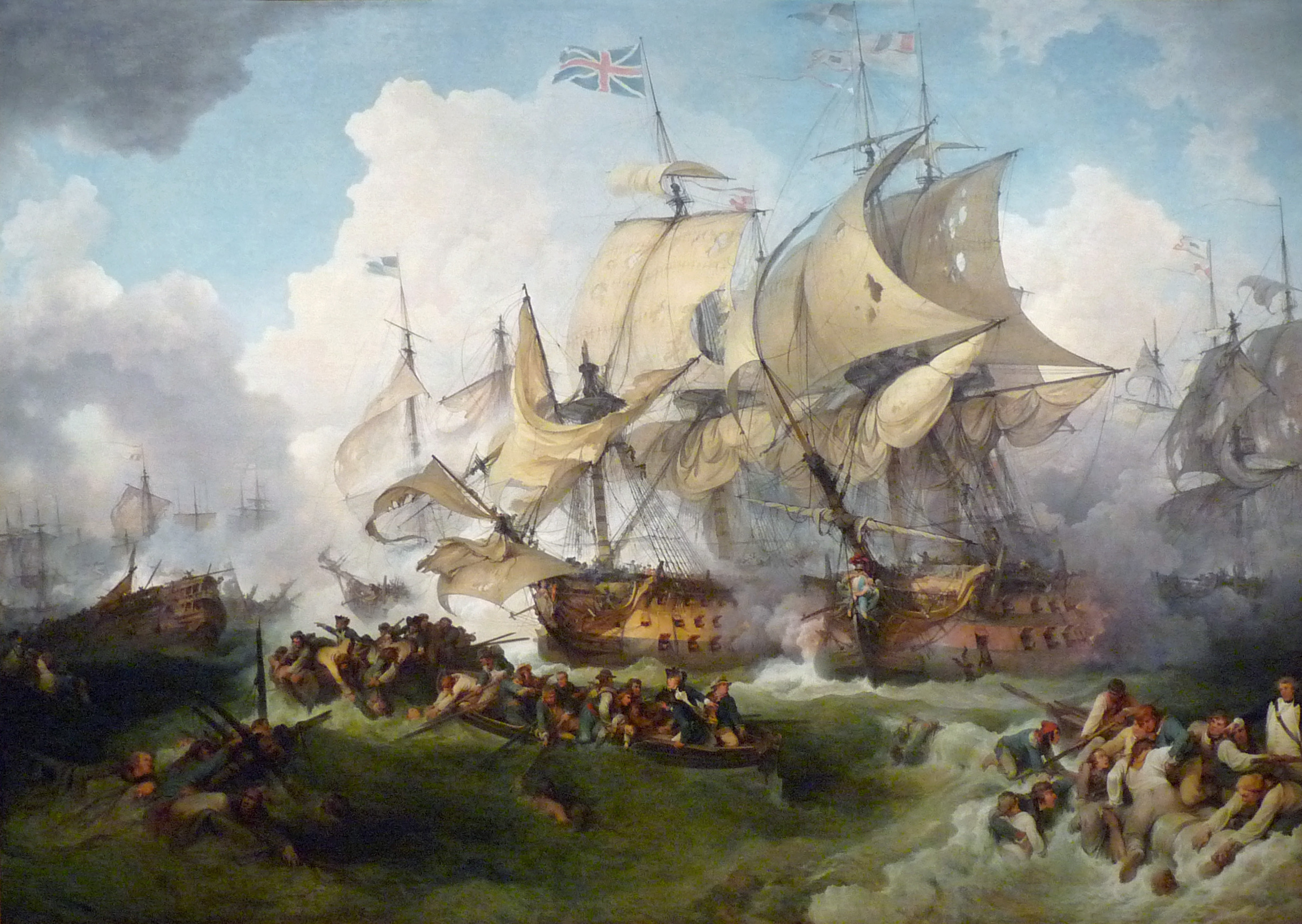
The first-rate HMS Queen Charlotte is shown on the left in this painting

In February 1800 Dundas was aboard Lord Keith's flagship, the first-rate HMS Queen Charlotte. Dundas was junior to Lieutenant Lord Cochrane but Cochrane had taken command of Nelson's prize, the Genereaux, in late 1799 to take her into port; Dundas therefore became 5th Lieutenant of the Queen Charlotte. One month later, early in the morning of 17 March 1800, cries of "Fire" rang out throughout the vessel. Some hay lying under the half-deck had been set on fire by a match kept there for the signal guns. Dundas was in the forecastle where he organized fire-fighting efforts. Dundas led a party below decks where they secured the main and fore hatches and then opened the lower-deck ports and the sea cocks to flood the lower decks to prevent the fire spreading down. These efforts delayed the fire from reaching the two magazines. Dundas continued working below decks until some middle-deck guns fell through the deck. At about 9am Dundas climbed out the foremost lower-deck port and climbed up to the forecastle, joining the about 150 men there who were throwing water on the fire. Despite the crew's exertions, the Queen Charlotte eventually blew up with the loss of 673 people out of its complement of 840 officers, men and boys, including the Captain and her first Lieutenant. Dundas however survived.

=== HMS Cameleon ===
By 14 June 1800 Dundas was captain of the sloop Cameleon. She and Salamine shared in the capture on that day of the Genoese brig Anima Purgatoria, which was sailing from Bastia to Salcolight.

=== HMS Calpe ===
Next, Dundas was appointed to the command of the sixth-rate HMS Calpe. On the night of 27 October 1800, Francis Beaufort, inventor of the Beaufort Wind-Scale, had led Phaeton's boats on a cutting out expedition. They captured the San José, alias Aglies, of 14 guns, which they immediately re-commissioned under the name of HMS Calpe, the ancient name of Gibraltar. Although it would have been usual to promote Beaufort, the successful and heroic leader of the expedition, to command Calpe, Lord Keith chose instead to promote Dundas who not only was not present at the battle, but was junior to Beaufort. Dundas was promoted to commander in December 1800.

In July 1801 Dundas was in command of Calpe at the Battle of Algeciras Bay. After the third-rate HMS Hannibal grounded, Dundas, deceived by a signal from her, sent his boats to save Hannibal's crew. The French detained the boats and their crews, including Calpe's lieutenant, Thomas Sykes; after firing several broadsides at the enemy's shipping and batteries, Dundas and Calpe returned to Gibraltar. In the subsequent second phase of the Battle of Algeciras Bay, the two Spanish first-rates Real Carlos and Hermenegildo fired upon each other during the night, caught fire and exploded, with tremendous loss of life. The British captured the third-rate St Antoine, with Superb and Calpe then assisting in securing the prize and removing the prisoners. Rear Admiral James Saumarez promoted Dundas to post-captain on 9 August 1801 and Dundas took command of St Antoine, which he sailed back to England.

=== Politics ===
After the peace of 1802, Dundas entered politics becoming Whig Member of Parliament for Richmond in the 1802 general election but resigned in February 1806, using the device of applying to be Steward of the Manor of East Hendred, to take up an offer of a naval command again and to allow his brother Charles to re-enter Parliament. In February 1805, he was given command of the fifth-rate HMS Quebec.

=== HMS Euryalus ===
In January 1806 Dundas took command of fifth-rate Apollo-class frigate HMS Euryalus. Euryalus was asked, along with HMS Ocean and several other warships to act as escorts to a large convoy bound for Oporto, Lisbon and the Mediterranean. Towards the end of 1807 Euryalus returned to England with Niger as escort to a convoy of several thousand troops under Sir John Moore from Gibraltar. She went into dock at Plymouth for a refit and was then stationed in the North Sea. She carried the Duke d'Angoulême from Yarmouth to Gottenburg and escorted the Baltic convoys through the Great Belt.

In June 1808 Dundas discovered several vessels at anchor at the entrance of Nakskov close into the shore. He anchored and sent four boats to destroy them. They burnt two large troop transports and captured a gun-vessel armed with two 18-pounders and carrying 64 men. The enemy lost seven men killed and twelve wounded, as well as many drowned; the British had one man slightly wounded. During the same year Dundas went to Elbing, a small port in West Prussia about 60 kilometers east of Danzig (now in Poland) to embark Marie Joséphine of Savoy (the consort of Louis XVIII), the Duc du Berry and other members of the French royal family. He took them to Carlscrona in southern Sweden and, after re-embarking them at Gottenburg, finally to Harwich.

Dundas was also involved in the Walcheren Campaign in July 1809 when a British armed force of 39,000 men landed on Walcheren. Euryalus joined the squadron which forced the passage of the Scheldt between the batteries at Flushing and Cadsand on 11 August 1809. Euryalus had no casualties although two men were killed and nine wounded in the other ships. Later she was stationed off Cherbourg under the orders of Captain Sir Richard King, and in November 1809 she captured the French privateer lugger Etoile of 14 guns and 48 men. In the spring of 1810 Euryalus escorted a large convoy from Spithead to Portugal and the Mediterranean and was then attached to Captain Blackwood's inshore squadron off Toulon.

Early in 1811 Dundas temporarily took command of the 74-gun third rate Achille until relieved by Captain Aiskew Paffard Hollis, who had transferred from Standard. Dundas then returned to Euryalus. On 7 June 1811 the boats of Euryalus and Swallow captured the French privateer Intrepide off Corsica after a long chase. She had a crew of 58 and was armed with two 8-pounders.

Dundas became Member of Parliament for Richmond again at a by-election in 1812 but was defeated at the 1812 general election.

=== HMS Edinburgh ===
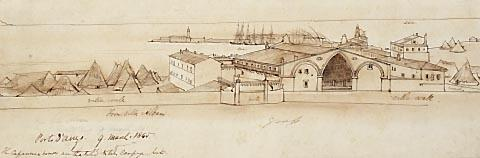
Porto D'Anzo, Edward Lear, 1845, Auckland Art Gallery

In October 1812 Dundas transferred to the 74-gun Third Rate Edinburgh. In 1813 Dundas and Edinburgh were in the Mediterranean. On the morning of 5 October, Edinburgh joined Capt. Duncan of Imperieuse off Porto D'Anzo where he and Resistance, Swallow, Eclair and Pylades had been watching a convoy for some days with the intention of attacking it. The place was defended by two batteries mounting three heavy guns each on the mole, a tower with one gun and a battery with two guns. During the attack in the afternoon, Edinburgh supported Eclair and Pylades as they bore up against the battery to the south. After the ships opened fire, landing parties brought out the 29 vessels of the convoy, 20 of which were laden with wood for the arsenal at Toulon. All the works were blown up.

On 30 November 1812 Dundas was placed in command of a small squadron consisting of Edinburgh, Furieuse and Termagant which landed troops at Viareggio in Italy. Some 600 cavalry and infantry from the Livorno garrison attacked the British troops, who routed them, capturing two field pieces and a howitzer. From the prisoners they learned of the weak state of the garrison and asked to be re-embarked to be taken to Livorno. The British troops and Marines landed on the evening of 13 December and they occupied the suburbs of the town. Some 700 cavalry and infantry attacked the marines, who opened to let the cavalry pass through them. The marines charged, killing, wounding or taking prisoner between 250 and 300 men. Edinburgh had just three marines wounded.

== Post-war ==
At the end of the war, Dundas left the Edinburgh at Genoa and traveled overland back to Britain. After retiring from the Navy in 1815, he became a Companion of the Bath that year.

Dundas won a seat as Member of Parliament for Orkney and Shetland at the 1818 general election but was defeated at the 1820 general election. He again became Member of Parliament for Orkney and Shetland at the 1826 general election but was defeated again at the 1830 general election. He was also promoted to rear-admiral in 1830.

Dundas became Second Naval Lord in the Grey ministry in November 1830; having been appointed a Deputy Lieutenant of York in 1831. On 2 November 1831 he was appointed as Comptroller of the Navy and member of the Navy Board until June 1832 when it was abolished and its functions were merged with the Board of Admiralty. He was elevated to First Naval Lord in the First Melbourne ministry in August 1834 but died in office, unmarried, of apoplexy at Upleatham in North Yorkshire just two months later on 7 October 1834. He is buried at Marske in North Yorkshire.

== Fictional references ==
A heavily fictionalized Dundas appears in several of Patrick O'Brian's Aubrey-Maturin novels, as the oldest friend of Captain Jack Aubrey, and as (fictionally) the son of First Lord of the Admiralty Henry Dundas, 1st Viscount Melville, and the younger brother of First Lord of the Admiralty Robert Dundas, 2nd Viscount Melville.

Dundas is a peripheral character in C. Northcote Parkinson's 1976 novel Touch and Go who, like O'Brian, places his hero at the Battle of Algeciras, where he interacts with Dundas.

== Sources ==
- James, William (1837). Naval History of Great Britain 1793 – 1827 (London). ISBN 978-1116143119. Archived from the original on 2 July 2008.
- Marshall, John (1824). Royal Naval Biography; Or Memoirs of the Services of All The Flag-Officers, Superannuated Rear-Admirals, Retired Captains, Post-Captains And Commanders. Kessinger. ISBN 978-0-548-24427-2.
- Urban, Sylvanus (1835). The Gentleman's Magazine, Vol. 157. John Bowyer Nichols & Son.
- Winfield, Rif (2008). British Warships in the Age of Sail 1793–1817: Design, Construction, Careers and Fates 2nd edition. Seaforth Publishing. ISBN 978-1-84415-717-4.

Parliament of the United Kingdom
Preceded by Lawrence Dundas and Arthur Shakespeare	Member of Parliament for Richmond, North Yorkshire; 1802–1806; With: Arthur Shakespeare	Succeeded by Charles Lawrence Dundas and Arthur Shakespeare
Preceded by Lawrence Dundas and Robert Chaloner	Member of Parliament for Richmond, North Yorkshire; 1812–1812; With: Robert Chaloner	Succeeded by Dudley North and Robert Chaloner
Preceded by Richard Honyman	Member of Parliament for Orkney & Shetland; 1818–1820	Succeeded by John Balfour
Preceded by John Balfour	Member of Parliament for Orkney & Shetland; 1826–1830	Succeeded by George Traill
Military offices
New post	Second Naval Lord; 1830–1834	Succeeded by Sir William Parker
Preceded by Sir Thomas Hardy	First Naval Lord; 1834	Succeeded by Sir Charles Adam
