= Isaac Heinemann =

Israeli rabbinical scholar and professor

- יצחק היינמן
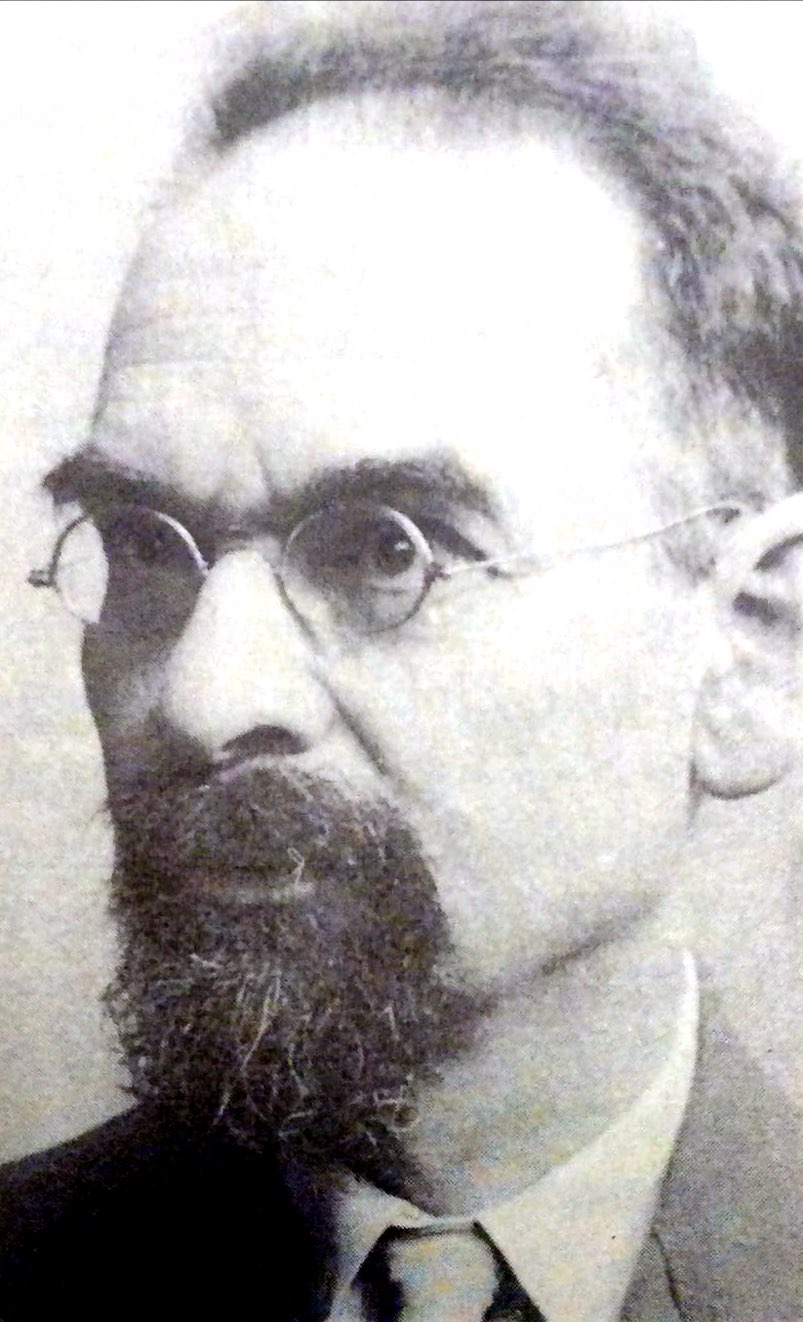
- Born: 5 June 1876; Frankfurt, Germany
- Died: 28 July 1957 (aged 81); Jerusalem, Israel
- Occupations: Rabbinical scholar; Professor of classical literature, Hellenistic literature, and philology
- Awards: Israel Prize (1955)

Academic work
- Discipline: Jewish studies
- Sub-discipline: Classical literature, Hellenistic literature, and philology
- Institutions: Hebrew University of Jerusalem

Isaac Heinemann (Hebrew: יצחק היינמן; born 5 June 1876; died 28 July 1957) was an Israeli rabbinical scholar and a professor of classical literature, Hellenistic literature and philology.

== Biography ==
Heinemann was born in Frankfurt, Germany in 1876. In 1897, he received rabbinic ordination. He emigrated to then British Mandate of Palestine, now Israel, in 1939 and joined the faculty of Hebrew University of Jerusalem.

== Awards ==
- In 1955, Heinemann was awarded the Israel Prize, for Jewish studies.

== See also ==
- List of Israel Prize recipients
- Heinemann (disambiguation)
