= Heideman =

Heideman is a German and Dutch surname. Notable people with the surname include:

- Esther Heideman, American opera singer
- Jan Maarten Heideman (born 1973), Dutch speed skater
- Mike Heideman (1948–2018), American basketball coach

== See also ==
- Heidemann
