= Heinzmann =

Heinzmann is a surname. Notable people with the surname include:

- Rolf Heinzmann, Swiss para-alpine skier
- Stefanie Heinzmann (born 1989), Swiss soul and pop singer
- Thilo Heinzmann (born 1969), German artist

== See also ==
- Heinemann (surname)
- Hinzmann
