= Heinemann (surname) =

Heinemann is a German surname.

== Geographical distribution ==
As of 2014, 79.3% of all known bearers of the surname Heinemann were residents of Germany (frequency 1:3,195), 11.1% of the United States (1:102,921), 2.0% of Australia (1:37,205) and 1.5% of Brazil (1:418,225).

In Germany, the frequency of the surname was higher than national average (1:3,195) in the following states:

1. Thuringia (1:965)
2. Saxony-Anhalt (1:990)
3. Lower Saxony (1:1,535)
4. Bremen (1:2,174)
5. Hesse (1:2,361)
6. Hamburg (1:2,724)
7. Berlin (1:3,012)
8. North Rhine-Westphalia (1:3,022)

== People ==
- Alexander Heinemann (1873–1918), German baritone
- Barbara Heinemann Landmann (1795–1883), Alsatian pietist
- Ed Heinemann (1908–1991), American aircraft designer
- Eda Heinemann (1880–1978), American actress
- Fritz Heinemann (artist) (1864–1932), German sculptor
- Fritz Heinemann (philosopher) (1889–1970), German philosopher
- Gustav Heinemann (1899–1976), German politician
- Hermann von Heinemann (1812–1871), German entomologist
- Isaac Heinemann, (1876–1957), Israeli rabbinical scholar and professor
- Josefine Heinemann (born 1998), German chess women grandmaster
- Larry Heinemann (1944–2019), American novelist
- Margot Heinemann (1913–1992), British writer
- Tim Means (environmentalist) Heinemann (1944–2019), American Mexican Environmentalist
- Moshe Heinemann (born 1935), Orthodox rabbi
- Rudolph J. Heinemann (1901–1975), American art dealer and collector
- Sven Heinemann (born 1978), German politician
- Tom Heinemann (born 1987), American soccer player
- Uta Ranke-Heinemann (1927–2021), German theologian
- William Heinemann (1863–1920), founder of Heinemann Publishers

== See also ==
- Heineman
