= Murdoch MacKenzie =

Scottish minister and prelate

Murdoch MacKenzie (Scottish Gaelic: Muireadhach MacCoinnich) (1600–1688) was a 17th-century Scottish minister and prelate who served as Protestant Bishop of Orkney.

== Life ==
He was born in 1600, the son of John MacKenzie of the Gairloch, his family being an offshoot of the kin of the earls of Seaforth. After being ordained by John Maxwell, Bishop of Ross, he served as a chaplain in a regiment of King Gustavus Adolphus of Sweden during the Thirty Years' War. He returned from Germany to become parson (i.e. rector) of the parish of Contin in Ross, moving to take charge of the church of Inverness, and then taking over as minister of Elgin. Following the Restoration and re-establishment of Episcopacy, MacKenzie was selected to be the new Bishop of Moray on 18 January 1662. He was translated to the bishopric of Orkney on 14 February 1677. He was nearly a hundred years old, and yet enjoyed the perfect use of all his faculties to the very last. See Keith's Historical Catalogue of the Scottish Bishops, p. 228. M'Kenzie is said to have sworn the Covenant ten times, and, according to others, not less than fourteen times.

He died on 17 February 1688.

== Family ==
He married Margaret MacLey the daughter of Dòmhnall Mac an Lèigh (Anglicised: Donald McLey), bailie of the burgh of Fortrose. Murdoch and Margaret had several children.

Church of Scotland titles
| Vacant Title last held by John Guthrie | Bishop of Moray; 1662–1677 | Succeeded by James Aitken |
| Preceded by Andrew Honyman | Bishop of Orkney; 1677–1688 | Succeeded by Andrew Bruce |
