= Hyneman =

Hyneman may refer to:

- Frank Hyneman Knight (1885–1972), an important economist in the first half of the 20th century
- Jamie Hyneman (born 1956), an American special effects expert, best known for being the co-host of the television series MythBusters
- John M. Hyneman (1771–1816), a Pennsylvanian member of the U.S. House of Representatives from March 4, 1811
- Rebekah Hyneman (1812–1875), Jewish-American poet and novelist
