= Malcolm Laing =

Scottish historian, advocate and politician

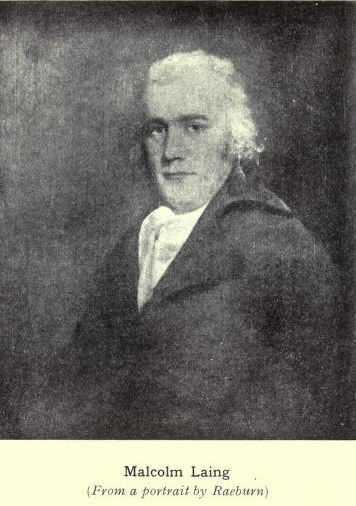
Malcolm Laing

Malcolm Laing (1762 – 6 November 1818) was a Scottish historian, advocate and politician.

== Life ==
He was born to Robert Laing and Barbara Blaw at the paternal estate of Strynzia or Strenzie, on Stronsay, Orkney; Samuel Laing and Gilbert Laing Meason were his brothers. He attended the grammar school in Kirkwall, and was a student at Edinburgh University. He joined the Speculative Society in 1782.

In 1785 Laing was admitted advocate, and from 1789 for five years was advocate for poor litigants. During 1790 he was working on the electoral roll in Orkney, in the Whig interest. In 1794, with Adam Gillies, he defended Joseph Gerrald in his sedition case. Sir James Mackintosh, a friend, regarded Laing's delivery as far too fast, and an impediment to his legal career; Henry Cockburn, Lord Cockburn commented quite positively on his "hard, peremptory, Celtic manner and accent".

Laing signed the declaration of the Society of Friends of the People in 1794, and joined the Whig Club. A personal friend of Charles James Fox, he was one of a group of advisers of Fox during the first years of the 19th century on his work of British history, with William Belsham, Samuel Heywood and James Maitland, 8th Earl of Lauderdale. He was Member of Parliament for Orkney and Shetland from 1807 to 1812, brought in by the Ministry of All the Talents.

In 1808 Laing suffered a breakdown, and withdrew from public life. He introduced merino sheep on the islands of Eday and Sanday, purchasing a flock from Tweeddale that had belonged to Sir James Montgomery, 1st Baronet. At the end of his life he tried to introduce the brown hare.

== Works ==
=== History ===
Laing finished Robert Henry's History of Great Britain with a final volume in 1793, and wrote a History of Scotland from the Union of the Crowns to the Union of the Kingdoms (1800). In a second edition of the History in 1804 half the work was devoted to a Dissertation on the participation of Mary Queen of Scots in the Murder of Darnley and the Casket Letters, hostile to Mary, Queen of Scots. Like George Brodie and Ebenezer Marshal, Laing dwelled on negative feudal and other features of early modern Scottish history. In 1804 also Laing edited The Historie and Life of King James the Sext.

By modern standards, Laing erred by endorsing a "Scottish Gothic" theory of the Picts: that this founding group of the Kingdom of Scotland were not Celts, but had a Teutonic origin. He endorsed the views of John Pinkerton on the matter, as did John Jamieson and James Sibbald.

=== Ossian critic ===
In 1805 Laing published in two volumes Poems of Ossian, containing the Poetical Works of James MacPherson in Prose and Verse, with Notes and Illustrations. It contained juvenilia by James Macpherson, collector of the Ossian poems, who had died in 1796. It also described how they might be dependent on modern sources that had been borrowed. Laing's flawed criticism was seminal for a far fetched theory that Macpherson had used Robert Lowth's study of Hebrew verse to construction his own alleged translations.

For Charles James Fox, as explained in a letter to Laing, Macpherson was in the ranks of politically mischievous historians, led by David Hume and his A History of England. Others they attacked were Sir John Dalrymple, 4th Baronet and Thomas Somerville. The underlying issue was Tory and Jacobite revisionism of the fabricated Whig historical narrative.

The "Ossian debate", on the poems' authenticity to supposed ancient sources, was coming to a head that year. Via Robert Anderson, Laing claimed he was in possession of a confession by Macpherson of the complete fabrication to another party, Sir John Elliott, who had mentioned it to Thomas Percy. On the other hand, the Report of the Highland Society (1805) upheld the authenticity claims. Percy took the eirenic view that the blame game, at least, should cease.

== Family ==
On 10 September 1805 Laing married Margaret Dempster Carnegy, daughter of Thomas Carnegy of Craigo and Mary Gardyne. Margaret's sister was married to Adam Gillies, Lord Gillies.

== Notes ==
Parliament of the United Kingdom
Preceded by Robert Honyman	Member of Parliament for Orkney and Shetland; 1807 – 1812	Succeeded by Richard Honyman
