= Heynemann =

Heynemann is a surname of Germanic origin meaning "ruler of the household". Notable Heynemanns include:

- Bernd Heynemann (born 1954) German politician
- Laurent Heynemann (born 1948) French Jewish film director and screenwriter
- Mabel Blundell Heynemann (c. 1866–1952) British archaeologist and antiquarian
