= Heitzmann =

Heitzmann is a surname. Notable people with the surname include:

- Carl Heitzmann (1836–1896), Austrian pathologist and dermatologist
- Martha Crawford Heitzmann (born 1967), American businesswoman
- Sébastien Heitzmann (born 1979), French footballer
