= Katrina Honeyman =

British economic historian (1950–2011)

Katrina Honeyman (18 June 1950 – 23 October 2011) was a British economic historian and Professor of Social and Economic History at the University of Leeds. Much of her work focused on the role of women and children in industrialisation in Britain.

== Early life ==
Honeyman was born in London, one of the five children of John and Eleanor Honeyman, and the family later moved to Manchester. She graduated in Economic History and Sociology at the University of York and then gained a Ph.D. at the University of Nottingham: her thesis work on the social background of early entrepreneurs was later published as Origins of Enterprise.

== Academic career ==
Honeyman held temporary posts at the universities of Aberdeen and Manchester before taking up an appointment in the School of Economic and Social Studies at the University of Leeds in 1979. She worked at Leeds until her death. She was director of the Centre for Business History at Leeds 1993–1997, and in 1997 she moved to the university's School of History, being appointed Professor of Social and Economic History in 2008.

She was President of the Association of Business Historians for a year, served twice on the council of the Economic History Society, and was editor of the journal Textile History. She was a Fellow of the Royal Historical Society.

== Selected publications ==
- Origins of Enterprise: Business Leadership in the Industrial Revolution (1982, Manchester UP, ISBN 0719008735), based on her Ph.D. thesis
- Technology and Enterprise: Isaac Holden and the Mechanisation of Woolcombing in France, 1848-1914 (1986, by Katrina Honeyman and Jordan Goodman, Scolar, ISBN 0859677273)
- Gainful Pursuits: The Making of Industrial Europe, 1600-1914 1988, by Jordan Goodman and Katrina Honeyman, Edward Arnold, ISBN 0713166061)
- Leeds City Business 1893-1993: Essays marking the centenary of the incorporation (1993, edited by John Chartres and Katrina Honeyman, University of Leeds Press, ISBN 0853161577) commemorating the centenary of the city status of Leeds
- Women, Gender and Industrialisation, 1700-1870 (2000, Macmillan, ISBN 033369077X)
- Well Suited: a History of the Leeds Clothing Industry, 1850-1990 (2000, Oxford UP,ISBN 0199202370)
- Child Workers in England, 1780-1820: Parish Apprentices and the Making of the Early Industrial Labour Force (2007, Ashgate, ISBN 9780754662723)
