= Armadale, Sutherland =

Coordinates: 58.5499°N 4.0895°W

Armadale: Scottish Gaelic: Armadal; Scots: Airmadale
- Location within the Sutherland area
- Council area: Highland
- Lieutenancy area: Sutherland
- Country: Scotland
- Sovereign state: United Kingdom
- Postcode district: KW
- UK Parliament: Caithness, Sutherland and Easter Ross
- Scottish Parliament: Caithness, Sutherland and Ross

Armadale (Scottish Gaelic: Armadal, Scots: Airmadale) is a small village on the north coast of Scotland, in the council area of Highland. The village is part of the parish of Farr, in the county of Sutherland. Armadale is about 30 miles (50 kilometres) west of the town of Thurso, off the A836 road. The population of Armadale is 50 and shrinking, with 32% of the population being retired, and the remaining 68% population are working or at school.

== History ==
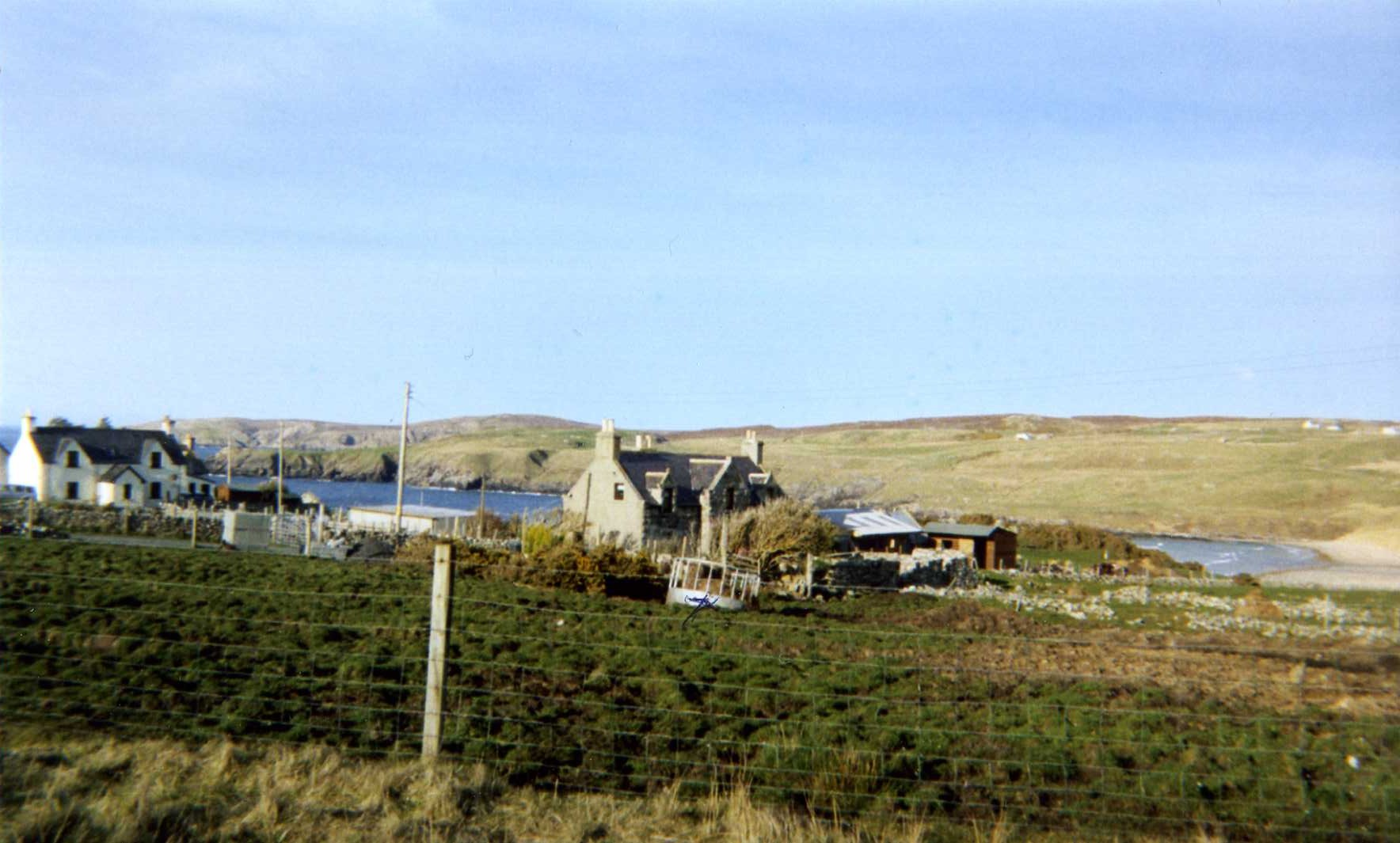
Part of the village of Armadale, looking out over Armadale Bay, the remains of Armadale Inn once owned by Alexander Munro & Barbara Mackay can be seen

Armadale is first mentioned in charters in the 13th century as part of the parish of Farr. There was a small fishing hamlet consisting of two or three houses north of the village before the year 1600 called Port Moir. In 1558, "Armydale" was listed among lands held by Helena Sinclair, the widow of Donald Mackay of Strathnaver. Produce from Armadale was sent to the royal garrison at Borve Castle.

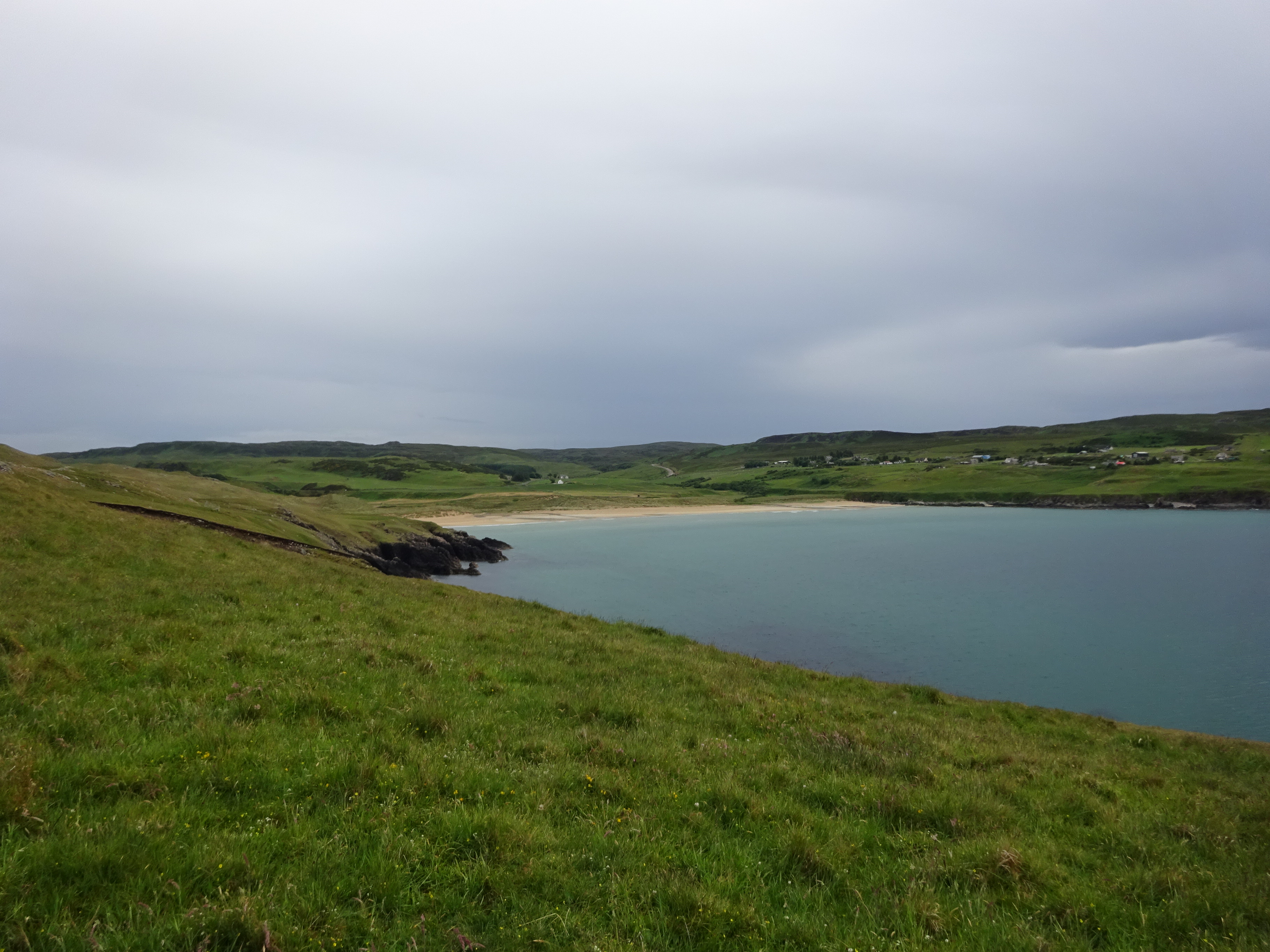
Armadale, seen across the bay from Fleuchary

William Honyman (whose mother, Margaret, was a daughter of John Mackay of Strathy) bought the estate from his grandfather about 1779 and built a new mansion at Armadale. The Armadale estate under the ownership of Honeyman was the first to bring the North Country Cheviot to Sutherland. William Honeyman, as a judge of the Court of Session took the title of “Lord Armadale of Strathy”. Honeyman removed the tenants that lived on both sides of the Armadale burn and settled them where the village is now before 1800.

In 1812 the Armadale Farm extended from the burn of Kirtomy in the west to the water of Strathy in the east, some six miles (ten kilometres) along the seashore and four miles (six kilometres) inland and contained about 50 acres (20 hectares) of green pasture and arable land. Honeyman sold the estate to the Duke of Sutherland in 1813 for the sum of £25,000. On a map of 1823 by John Thompson and William Johnson both the old Armadale and the new Armadale Fishing Village are shown. The present layout of the village was designed in 1855. 3 kilometres west of Armadale is the deserted township of Poulouriscaig, this was a post “Clearance” village of seven houses that was settled in the 1830s and the last family had left by 1935 and moved into the present village.

=== Etymology ===
The name "Armadale", meaning "elongated valley", derives from the Old Norse armr and dalr.

== Description ==
Since 2006, five new houses have been erected, two by Highland Council to encourage more people into the area, and three private builds. Armadale has an old school house, doctors house (both of which are now owned privately properties) and a new village hall, completed in 2021, used for the Strathy and Armadale Grazing Committee meetings and such. Armadale also has a Doctor's Surgery and the south end, which is the main surgery for places as far out west as Skerray and east as Melvich.

=== Reismeave ===
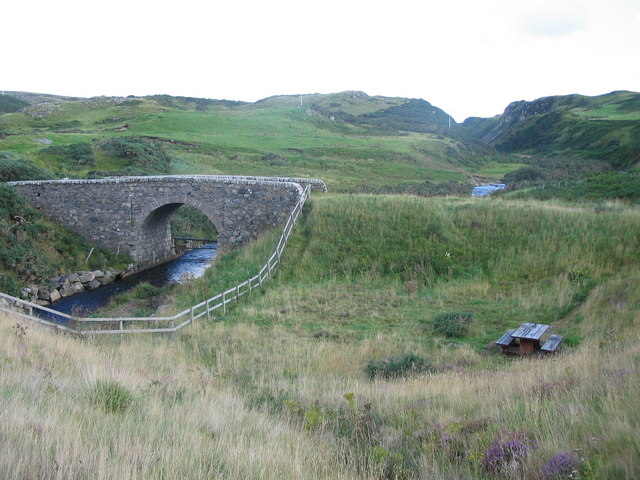
Bridge over Amadale Burn

At the north end of Armadale there is a point called Reismeave, which is a good local fishing spot and great for seeing the coastal birds such as the oystercatcher, rock dove and the famous puffin. This point is home to the famous and extremely rare Primula scotica, the Scottish primrose, although often very hard to find. Armadale beach is a half kilometre stretch of golden sands, offering good tanning and picnic spots during the summer months and two burns flowing either side of the beach, splitting it into three sections. The beach is at its best during the summer, which attracts surfers and body boarders, but the best time to go surfing is from late August to October. The rocks surrounding the bay are excellent for rock pooling and climbing. The beach is accessible by either Armadale itself, or parking near the eastern bridge, and heading down a small track.

== Other places of the same name ==
Unlike Armadale, Skye, both the town of Armadale, West Lothian and the suburb of Armadale, Victoria in Australia are named after the village of Armadale in Sutherland. There are the ruins of an old inn, in the centre of Armadale which was open in the early 19th century and was run by one Alexander Munro who was a boat builder and house carpenter and his wife Barbara Mackay. Their grandson was James Munro who was born in the village of Armadale, Sutherland and also went to school there. He moved to Australia and it was thanks to him that the Armadale in Victoria, Australia takes its name. At the north end of the village is Armadale Salmon Fishery, owned by James "Jukesy" Mackay. Further down is the red bus shelter, which is no longer in service due to Highland Council erecting a new one at the A836 end of the village. There is a new path down to Armadale Beach that was courtesy of the Allt Beag Armadale Trust, built and finished in mid-2005.
