= Gilbert Laing Meason =

Scottish merchant and agricultural improver

Gilbert Laing Meason of Lindertis FRSE FSA (3 July 1769 – 14 August 1832) was a Scottish merchant and agricultural improver, best remembered as the originator of the term landscape architecture.

== Life ==
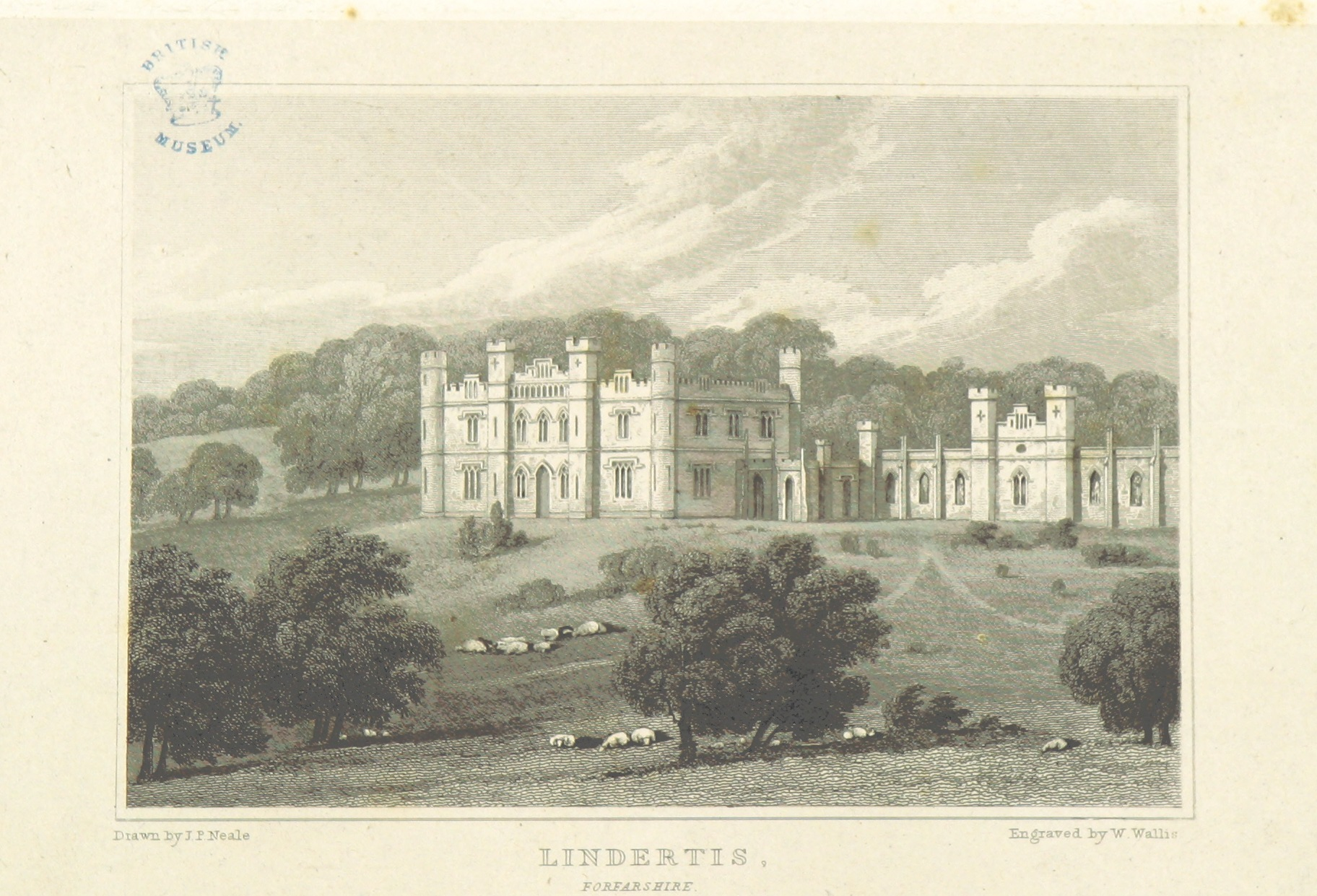
Lindertis House, Forfarshire

He was born Gilbert Laing in Kirkwall, the son of Robert Laing and Barbara Blaw. His brothers were the historian Malcolm Laing and the travel writer Samuel Laing.

In 1799 he appears as a merchant living at 26 St Andrew Square in Edinburgh's New Town still under the name of Gilbert Laing. He is thought to have adopted the suffix "Meason" upon his marriage.

Laing Meason lived on an estate called Lindertis, in Forfar, and was a friend of Sir Walter Scott. He was interested in art history, and in 1828 published a book called On The Landscape Architecture of the Great Painters of Italy (London, 1828). It dealt with the way that buildings and structures were sited within landscapes to produce beautiful compositions. The book sold poorly. Although essentially a work of art criticism, Laing Meason touched on subjects, such as the placing of buildings and their surroundings, which form a central part of the modern landscape architect's work.

Laing Meason had no reason to believe that the term he used would become popular. The term would probably have died out if it had not been taken up by the horticulturalist and planner John Claudius Loudon. Loudoun thought that the term had a wider application outside art theory, and explained this view in an article in the contemporary Gardener's Magazine. He felt that the phrase aptly described the composition of created landscapes, and cited the gardens of Deepdene as an exemplar.

The term was picked up by Loudon's American admirer Andrew Jackson Downing, from whom Frederick Law Olmsted presumably first heard it. Olmsted was the first professional to describe himself as a 'landscape architect', and is considered to be the founder of the modern profession of landscape architecture.

In 1813 he employed the Edinburgh architect Archibald Elliot to remodel his mansion at Lindertis House.

In 1815 he was elected a Fellow of the Royal Society of Edinburgh. His proposers were Thomas Allan, John Playfair and Thomas Charles Hope.

He died in Venice in 1832.

== Description ==
Gilbert Laing Meason (1769 - 1832) was a friend of Sir Walter Scott and the man who invented the term 'landscape architecture', as used in the title of this volume. Born in Kirkwall St Ola, Orkney, he later lived at Lindertis House near Forfar, in Fife, Scotland and was married to Mary Whitelaw Wemyss (1792-1858). His interest in architecture was inspired by the outward appearance of buildings and the placing of buildings and the types of space with which they are surrounded.[6]

When Gilbert Laing Mason Mechen was born on 13 June 1886, his father, Patrick Mechen, was 46 and his mother, Margaret McNeilly, was 40. He married Lily Warren Nicholls on 18 December 1917, in Christchurch, Canterbury, New Zealand. They were the parents of at least 2 sons and 3 daughters. He died on 11 July 1970, at the age of 84.[6]

[7]
