= Heidemann =

Heidemann is a German surname. Notable people with the surname include:

- Britta Heidemann (born 1982), German épée fencer
- Dirk Heidemann (born 1961), German ballroom dancer, fashion model, now author, dance sport coach and choreographer
- Gaille Heidemann, American voice actress
- Gerd Heidemann (1931–2024), German journalist known for his role in the publication of forged Hitler Diaries
- Günther Heidemann (1932–2010), boxer from Germany
- Hartmut Heidemann (1941–2022), German football player
- Jack Heidemann (born 1949), former right-handed Major League Baseball shortstop
- Jørgen Heidemann (born 1946), Danish handball player
- Lavon Heidemann (born 1958), former Lieutenant Governor of Nebraska
- Matthias Heidemann (1912–1970), German footballer
- Stefan Heidemann (born 1961), German orientalist at Hamburg University

== See also ==
- Heideman
