= Mabel Blundell Heynemann =

British archaeologist and antiquarian

Mabel Blundell Heynemann FSA (c. 1866 – 6 January 1952) was a British archaeologist and antiquarian.

== Biography ==
Heynemann grew up in Keighley and lived in Appletreewick and Bradford. She was one of the earliest members of the Brontë Society and was elected as a member of its council in 1930; a position she retained for the rest of her life. She also served as vice-president of the society. Heynemann was a founder-member of the Yorkshire Numismatic Society and a fellow of the Society of Antiquaries of London. When she was elected as a fellow she was then the only Yorkshirewoman in the society.

She died at her home, Vernon House, Bradford, on 6 January 1952, at the age of 85.

== Publications ==
- Heynemann, M.B. 1947. Appletreewick and District. Shipley.
