= Honeyman Island =

Island in Nunavut, Canada

- Location within Nunavut Location within Canada

Geography
- Location: Gulf of Boothia
- Coordinates: 69°05′N 85°18′W
- Archipelago: Arctic Archipelago

Administration
- Canada
- Territory: Nunavut
- Region: Qikiqtaaluk

Demographics
- Population: Uninhabited

Honeyman Island is an irregularly shaped, uninhabited island in Nunavut, Canada. It is located in the Qikiqtaaluk Region's side of the Gulf of Boothia within Committee Bay. It is west of the mainland's Melville Peninsula.
