= Tom Hinzmann =

German politician (born 1996)

Member of the Hamburg Parliament
- Incumbent
- Assumed office 26 March 2025

Personal details
- Born: 29 August 1996 (age 29)
- Party: Social Democratic Party (since 2012)

Tom Hinzmann (born 29 August 1996) is a German politician serving as a member of the Hamburg Parliament since 2025. From 2021 to 2023, he served as chairman of the Young Socialists in the SPD in Hamburg.
