= Rebekah Hyneman =

American poet

- Born: Rebekah Gumpert; 8 September 1812; Philadelphia, Pennsylvania
- Died: 10 September 1875 (aged 63)
- Spouse: Benjamin Hyneman (m. 1835; died 1839)
- Writing career
- Notable works: The Leper and Other Poems (1853)

Rebekah Hyneman (née Gumpert) (Hebrew: רבקה הינמן; 8 September 1812 – 10 September 1875) was an American Jewish author and poet, best known for her 1853 work The Leper and Other Poems.

== Biography ==
Rebekah Hyneman was born in Philadelphia in 1812 to Abraham Gumpert (né Gumpertz), a Jewish-German storekeeper, and a gentile mother. Raised in Bucks County, where there were no facilities for formal education, she became proficient in English composition and mastered French, German, and Hebrew through self-study.

In 1835, she married Jewish jewellery peddler Benjamin Hyneman. They had two children, Elias Leon (born in 1837) and Samuel (born in 1839). She was left a widow after five years of married life when in 1839, while she was pregnant with Samuel, Benjamin disappeared on a business trip to Texas and was presumed murdered. Rebekah and her sons formally converted to Judaism in 1845 under the aegis of Rabbi Isaac Leeser.

Hyneman turned to writing, becoming a regular contributor to The Occident and American Jewish Advocate and The Masonic Mirror and Keystone, founded by prominent Freemason Leon Hyneman, brother of her late husband and husband of her sister Sarah. She wrote for these periodicals a number of original stories, essays, and poems, and frequently presented translations from the works of different foreign authors. Her poetry and fiction were mainly on Jewish themes, and often dealt with the need to resist assimilation. Between 1846 and 1850, she published in The Occident “Female Scriptural Characters,” a series of poems paying homage to fourteen women of the Bible and the Apocrypha, including Ruth, Esther, Deborah, Judith, and the Matriarchs. A collection of over eighty poems entitled The Leper and Other Poems appeared in 1853, which included her best-known poems “The Leper,” “Zara,” “Livia," and “The Muses”.

Hyneman's son Samuel died in 1864 from a chronic condition which finally proved fatal. Shortly thereafter, her son Elias, a volunteer in the 5th Pennsylvania Cavalry Regiment during the American Civil War, died on 7 January 1865 from starvation after six months in the notorious Confederate prisoner-of-war camp at Andersonville Prison. She died on 10 September 1875.

== Partial bibliography ==
- Hyneman, Rebekah (1846–1850). "Female Scriptural Characters". The Occident and American Jewish Advocate.
- Hyneman, Rebekah (1853). The Leper, and Other Poems. Philadelphia: A. Hart.
- Hyneman, Rebekah (1853). "The Fatal Cosmetic: Mystery Novella". The Masonic Mirror and Keystone.
- Hyneman, Rebekah (1860). "The Doctor". The Masonic Mirror and Keystone.
- Hyneman, Rebekah (March–July 1862). "The Lost Diamond". The Occident and American Jewish Advocate.
