= Aaron Honeyman =

Australian basketball player

Personal information
- Born: 26 April 1972 (age 54) Traralgon, Victoria
- Listed height: 174 cm (5 ft 9 in)
- Listed weight: 68 kg (150 lb)

Career information
- Playing career: 1992–1999
- Position: Point guard

Career history
- 1992–1996: Southern Districts Spartans
- 1995–1998: Brisbane Bullets
- 1999: Mount Gambier Pioneers

Aaron Honeyman (born 26 April 1972) is an Australian former professional basketball player. Listed at 174 centimetres tall, he played the point guard position.

Honeyman played for the Brisbane Bullets of the National Basketball League (NBL) from 1995 to 1998. He averaged 2.8 points, 1.3 rebounds and 1.6 assists in 58 games played.

Honeyman played for the Southern Districts Spartans from 1992 to 1996 and won championships in 1992 and 1995. He played for the Mount Gambier Pioneers in 1999.
