= Samuel Laing (travel writer) =

Scottish travel writer

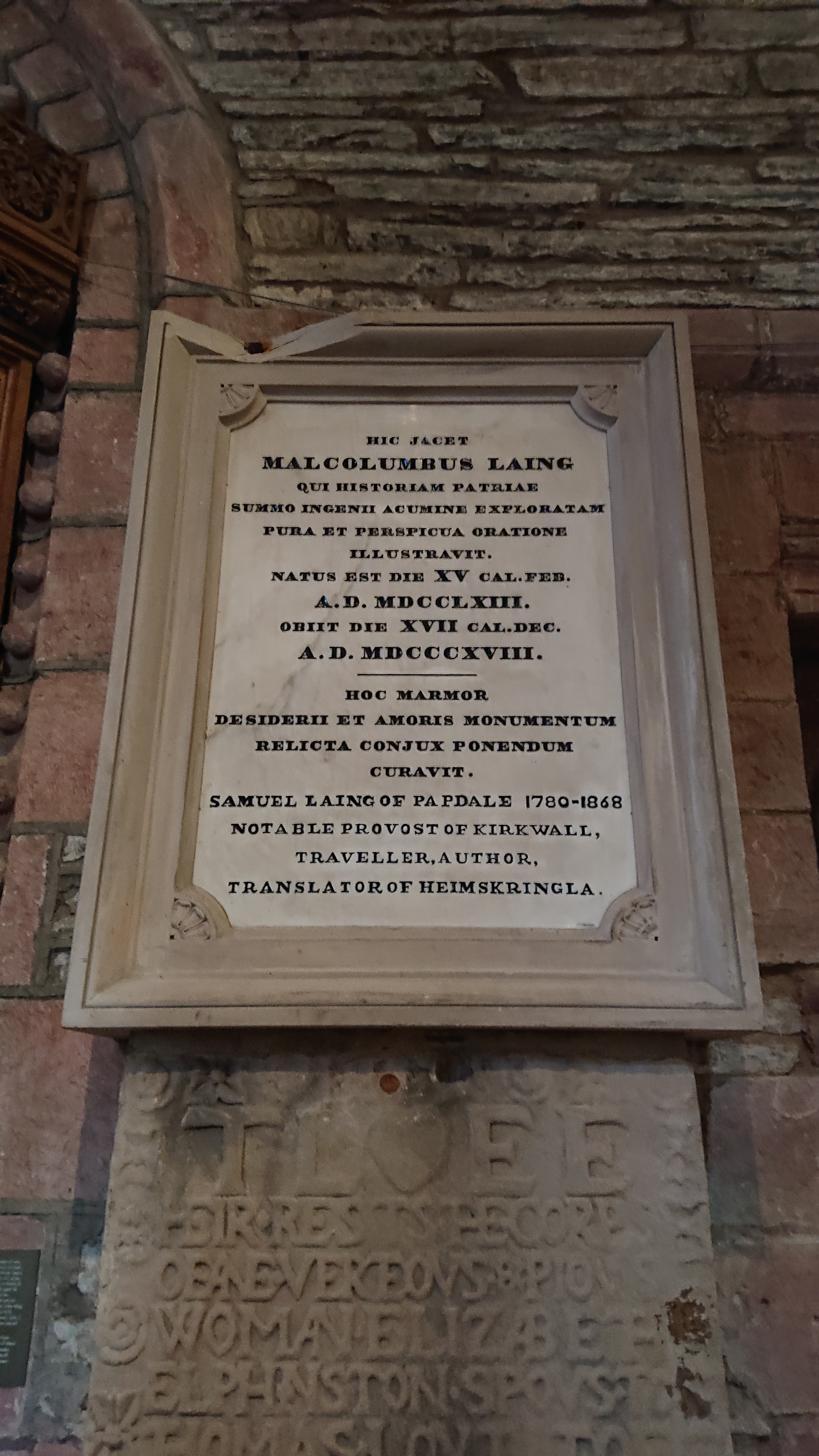
Epitaph for Samuel Laing in St Magnus Cathedral in Kirkwall

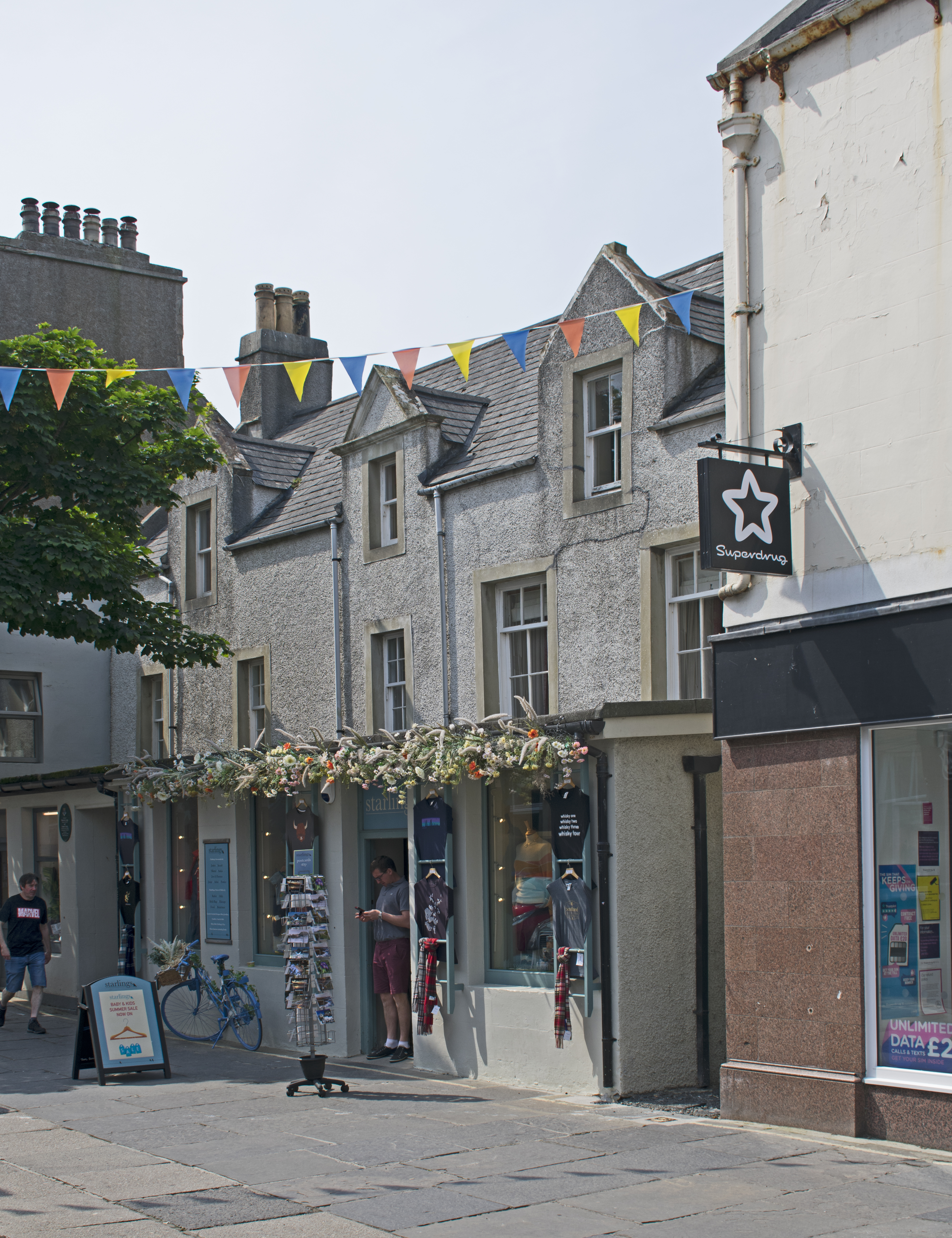
Laing's birthplace in Kirkwall

Samuel Laing (1780–1868) from Papdale in Orkney was a Scottish travel writer. He travelled in Scandinavia and northern Germany and published descriptions of these countries. Laing was the first translator of Heimskringla by Snorri Sturluson.

He unsuccessfully contested the Orkney and Shetland parliamentary constituency in 1832 against incumbent MP George Traill. Held after the passage of the Great Reform Act, this was the first election in which Shetlanders had the right to vote. Laing had won an early majority of votes counted in Orkney and was initially celebrated as the victor, however the delayed arrival of votes from Shetland produced a majority of 11 for Traill. The loss of Laing's majority provoked a riot in Kirkwall, leading to one fatality. Laing's subsequent attempt to lodge a legal challenge to his defeat was also unsuccessful.

Laing's son, also named Samuel Laing, was a railway administrator and important writer on religion and science, and a Liberal member of parliament. Laing's older brother, Malcolm Laing, was a notable historian. The merchant Gilbert Laing Meason was his older brother as well.

== Works ==
- Journal of a residence in Norway during the years 1834, 1835, and 1836, 1836
- A tour in Sweden in 1838, 1839
  - In this work, the author strongly criticises the Swedish-Norwegian union, implying that Norway ought to strive for independence. This caused a comment from the Swedish-Norwegian ambassador in London, M. Björnstierna, On the moral state and political union of Sweden and Norway, 1840.
- Notes of a traveller, 1842
  - Covers journeys in Prussia and other countries. The preface contains a response to Björnstierna.
- Heimskringla. The Chronicle of the Kings of Norway, 3 vols., 1844
  - English translation of the 13th-century Icelandic work by Snorri Sturluson, Heimskringla.
