= John Balfour (Orkney MP) =

Scottish politician and civil servant

John Balfour (6 November 1750 – 15 October 1842) was a Scottish politician and a civil servant in the East India Company with connections to the Orcadian island of Shapinsay.

== Background ==
John Balfour was the son of William Balfour, a factor to the Dundas family. The family was descended from the Balfours of Trenabie on the island of Westray. Having made a fortune in India, John Balfour married the widow of a Colonel Mackennan, who along with other British expatriates, had lent money to the Rajah of Tanjore, who then refused to repay the loans.

== Political career ==
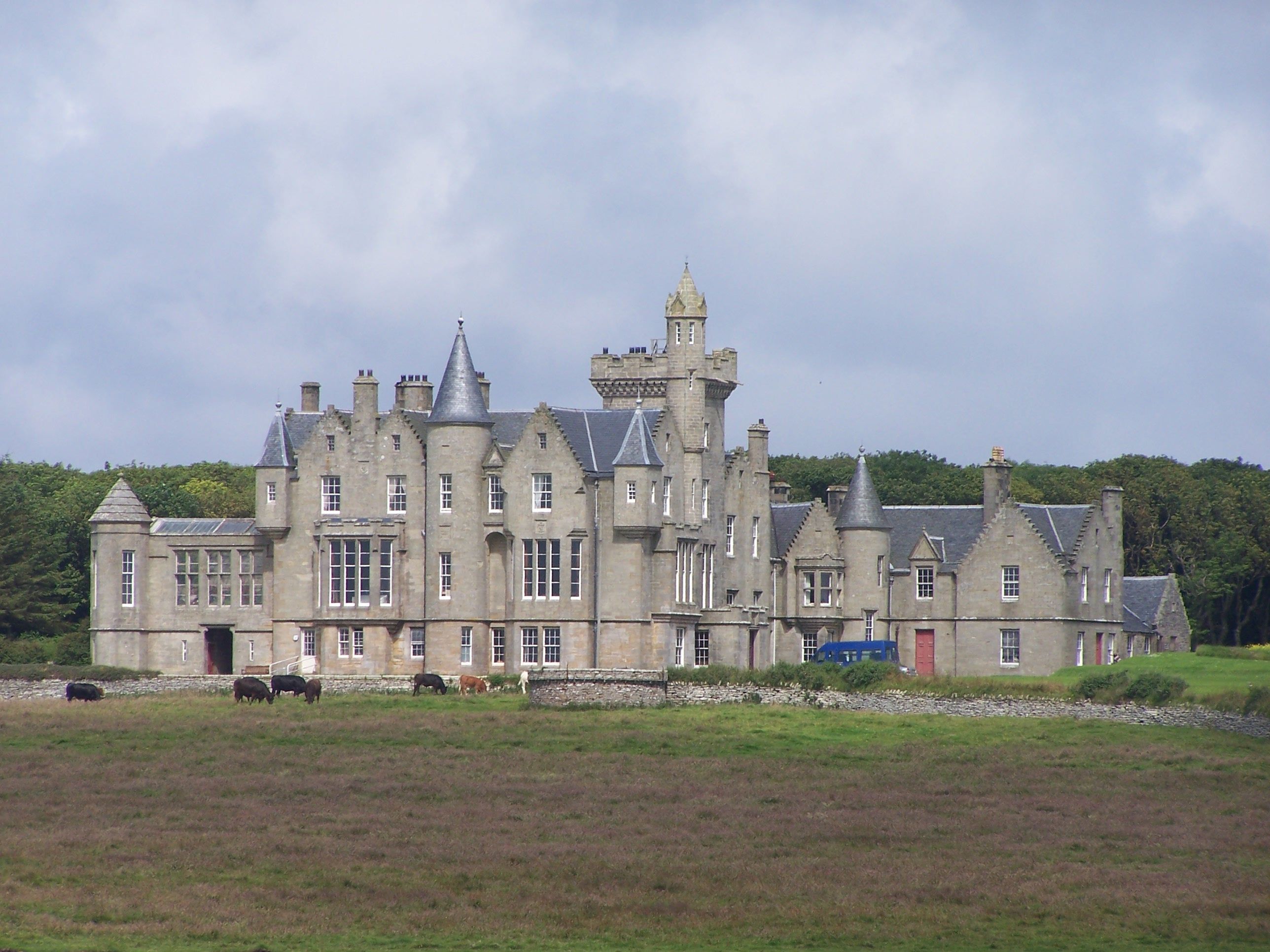
Balfour Castle

Balfour was elected Member of Parliament for Orkney and Shetland on 28 July 1790. He used his new political connections to put pressure on the British Government who eventually engineered compensation for the lenders to the Rajah, so providing his wife with a "substantial benefit". He decided to retire at the next election in 1796 in favour of Robert Honyman. Balfour was MP for Orkney and Shetland again from 1820 to 1826.

== Shapinsay ==
In 1827 he bought the Honyman estate on the island of Shapinsay and the village of Balfour takes its name from the family interest in the island. He commenced the building of Balfour Castle on the island on the site of an older structure. The work was completed by his son, Colonel David Balfour.

== Notes ==
Parliament of Great Britain
Preceded by Thomas Dundas	Member of Parliament for Orkney and Shetland; 1790 – 1796	Succeeded by Robert Honyman
Parliament of the United Kingdom
Preceded by George Dundas	Member of Parliament for Orkney and Shetland; 1820 – 1826	Succeeded by George Dundas
