= Thomas Dundas (British Army officer) =

British Army officer, politician and colonial administrator

Major-General Thomas Dundas
- Born: 30 June 1750
- Died: 3 June 1794 (aged 43)
- Military career
- Allegiance: Great Britain
- Branch: British Army
- Rank: Major-General
- Conflicts: Seven Years' War; American War of Independence; Wars of the French Revolution

Major-General Thomas Dundas (30 June 1750 – 3 June 1794) was a British Army officer, politician and colonial administrator who served as the governor of Guadeloupe. He held a seat in the British House of Commons between 1771 and 1790.

== Life ==
Born the son of Thomas Dundas of Fingask, Dundas was educated at Edinburgh High School and entered the British Army in 1766, rising to Major of the 65th Foot. He was elected Member of Parliament for the Stewartry of Orkney & Shetland in 1771 retaining the seat until 1780.

As Lieutenant Colonel of the 80th Foot he saw action in the American Revolutionary War, serving under Benedict Arnold in the raid against Richmond. Under Arnold and William Phillips, he was present at the capture of Williamsburg, Blandford, the attack on Osborne's, and Manchester. Then he passed under the command of Charles Cornwallis. He commanded the left wing at Green Spring. With Banastre Tarleton, he was bottled up by the Marquis de Choisy at Gloucester during the siege of Yorktown. Assigned as joint commissioner for carrying out the capitulation, he was made a prisoner of war after the fall of Yorktown. He was promoted to Colonel on 20 November 1782. After repatriation, he was appointed to the board of commission in 1782 to examine claims for compensation to those "who having remained loyal to the mother country, had suffered in their rights, properties and profession."

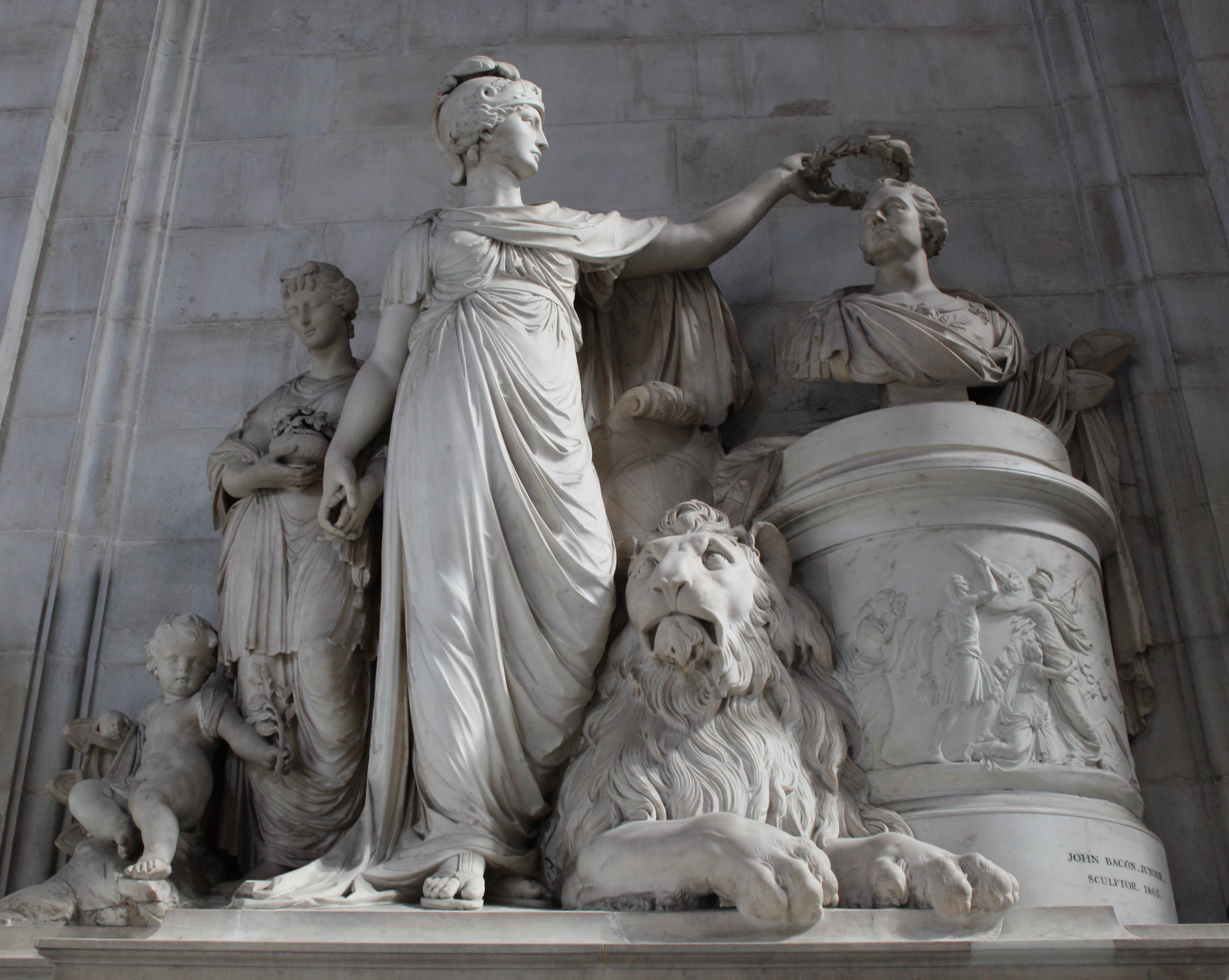
Thomas Dundas memorial, St Paul's Cathedral

Dundas married Lady Elizabeth Eleanora (d. 1837), daughter of Alexander Home, 9th Earl of Home, on 9 January 1784. He was elected MP for Orkney again in 1784 and sat until 1790.

Dundas was briefly Lieutenant Governor of Guernsey in 1793. He was promoted to Major General on 12 October 1793. After the outbreak of the French Revolutionary Wars, he served in the West Indies, commanding the 2nd Brigade under Charles Grey in Barbados in 1794. He served in the second invasion of Martinique in February and commanded the military forces under John Jervis in the invasion of Guadeloupe, landing on 12 April and capturing Grande-Terre. After accepting the French surrender on 20 April, he was made Governor of Guadeloupe, but died on 3 June of yellow fever and was buried in the primary bastion of Fort Maltilde.

When the French later regained possession of the island Victor Hugues issued a declaration on 10 December, which stated "That the body of Thomas Dundas, interred in Guadeloupe, shall be taken up and given as prey to the birds of the air." This aroused great outrage in England and prompted a memorial in St Paul's Cathedral. This was erected in 1805 and was sculpted by John Bacon.

Parliament of Great Britain
Preceded by Thomas Dundas (elder)	Member of Parliament for Orkney and Shetland; 1771–1780	Succeeded by Robert Baikie
Preceded by Charles Dundas	Member of Parliament for Orkney and Shetland; 1784–1790	Succeeded by John Balfour
Government offices
Preceded by William Brown	Lieutenant Governor of Guernsey; 1793	Succeeded by Sir James Craig
Military offices
Preceded by John Mansel	Colonel of the 68th (Durham) Regiment of Foot; 1794	Succeeded by Sir Alured Clarke
