= George Honyman =

British judge (1819–1875)

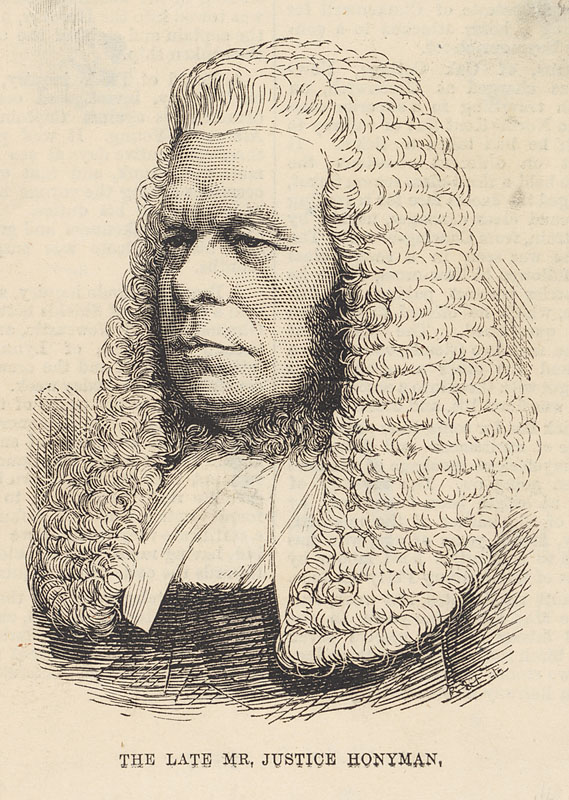
Sir George Essex Honyman.

Sir George Essex Honyman, 4th Baronet (22 January 1819–16 September 1875) was an English judge.

== Life ==
Honyman was born at Strawberry Hill, Middlesex, 22 January 1819. His father, Sir Ord Honyman, 3rd Baronet, born 25 March 1794, became lieutenant-colonel commanding the Grenadier Guards 27 December 1850, and died at Nice 27 January 1863, having married, 7 April 1818, Elizabeth Essex, youngest daughter of George Bowen of Coton Hall, Shropshire, an Admiral of the Red. She died at Boulogne 28 October 1864.

The eldest son, George Essex, was received in 1838 into the office of Martineau, Malton, & Trollope, solicitors, of Lincoln's Inn. In 1840 he became a pupil of Sir Fitzroy Kelly, and afterwards read with David Octavius Gibbons, the special pleader. In 1842 he commenced practice as a pleader. For seven years he had few clients, but studied hard, and mastered commercial law. On 8 June 1849 he was called to the bar at the Middle Temple, and went the home circuit, where he at once attracted the attention both of the leaders of the bar and of the bench. He was married on 26 November 1860 to Annie Johanna, daughter of Virtue Thirkettle of Kingston upon Thames; she died on 13 January 1881.

In 1853 he was the best commercial lawyer of the day. He was not a great orator, but he had a quick intellect, a tenacious memory, and was industrious and conscientiously thorough. He succeeded his father as fourth baronet in 1863. On 23 July 1866 he was appointed a queen's counsel, became a bencher of his inn in November 1866, and a serjeant-at-law 23 January 1873. On the recommendation of Lord Selborne he became a judge of the Court of Common Pleas, 23 January 1873.

Sir George resigned in February 1875 and died at Tunbridge Wells on 16 September 1875 aged 56.

== Family ==
He and his wife Annie Johanna, had no sons, so he was succeeded by his younger brother, the Rev. William Macdonald Honyman, as the fifth, and last, Honyman baronet. His wife died in Edinburgh in 1881 and is buried in St Cuthberts Churchyard.

== Arms ==
Coat of arms of George Honyman
Crest An arrow in pale point downwards Or feathered Argent. Escutcheon Argent on a bend engrailed Gules a bendlet of the field. Supporters Two lions rampant guardant Proper. Motto Progredere Ne Regredere (Advance, Recede Not)

Baronetage of the United Kingdom
Preceded by Ord John Honyman	Baronet (of Armadale); 1863–1875	Succeeded by William Honyman
