= Thomas Dundas (of Fingask and Carronhall) =

Scottish landowner and politician (c. 1708–1786)

Thomas Dundas (c. 1708 – 30 April 1786) of Fingask and Carronhall, Stirlingshire was a Scottish merchant and politician.

Dundas was the oldest son of Thomas Dundas of Fingask. His father was a bailie of Edinburgh and a woollen draper in the Luckenbooths. The family's lands in Perthshire were lost in the 17th century, but the bailie bought lands in Stirlingshire. Young Tomas and his brother Lawrence left their father's ailing business, Thomas acting as agent for Lawrence's highly profitable business supplying the British Army.

Thomas became a burgess of Edinburgh in 1734, and deputy Lord Lyon King of Arms from 1744 to 1754. In 1737, he married Anne, daughter of James Graham of Airth, a judge of the Scottish court of Admiralty. After her death he remarried, to Lady Janet Maitland, daughter of Charles Maitland, 6th Earl of Lauderdale. They had two sons and five daughters.

Dundas bought the Carronhall estate in 1749, but his career remained dependent on his increasingly powerful younger brother, in whose interest he was elected in 1768 as the Member of Parliament (MP) for Orkney and Shetland. He held the seat until December 1770, when he was appointed as a police commissioner, and in 1771 his oldest son Thomas was returned as MP in his place.

The younger Thomas went on to become a notable general in the British Army, serving briefly as Governor of Guadeloupe before his early death. The other son, Charles Dundas, was an MP for nearly 50 years before being ennobled as Baron Amesbury.

Parliament of Great Britain
Preceded by James Douglas	Member of Parliament for Orkney and Shetland; 1768–1770	Succeeded by Thomas Dundas (the younger)
