= Honyman baronets =

Extinct baronetcy in the Baronetage of the United Kingdom

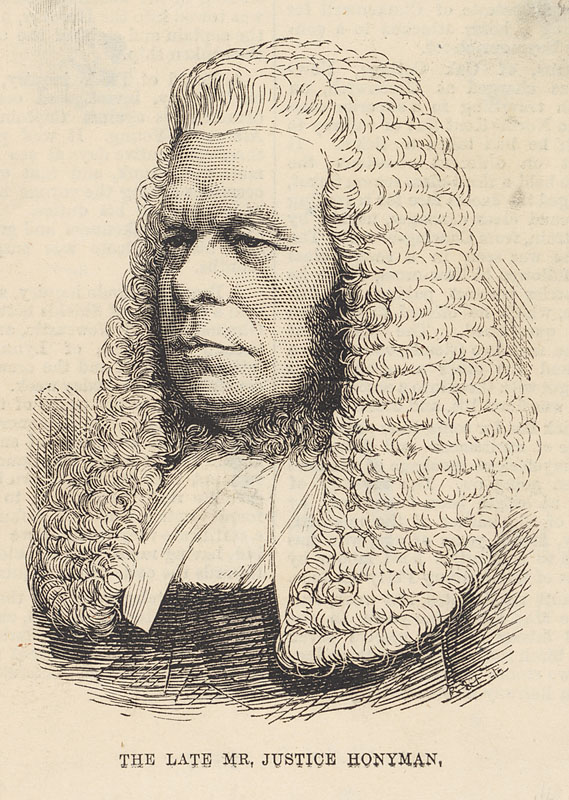
Sir George Honyman, 4th Baronet

The Honyman Baronetcy, of Armadale in the County of Orkney, was a title in the Baronetage of the United Kingdom. It was created on 19 May 1804 for William Honyman, a Lord of Session under the judicial title Lord Armadale. The second Baronet sat as Member of Parliament for Orkney. The fourth Baronet was a Judge of the Court of Common Pleas. The title became extinct on the death of the fifth Baronet in 1911.

Robert Honyman, younger brother of the first Baronet, was MP for Orkney from 1796 to 1807.

== Honyman baronets, of Armadale (1804) ==
- Sir William Honyman, 1st Baronet (died 1825)
- Sir Richard Bempdé Johnstone Honyman, 2nd Baronet (1787–1842)
- Sir Ord John Honyman, 3rd Baronet (1794–1863)
- Sir George Essex Honyman, 4th Baronet (1819–1875)
- Sir William Macdonald Honyman, 5th Baronet (1820–1911)

Coat of arms of Honyman baronets
Crest An arrow in pale point downwards Or feathered Argent. Escutcheon Argent on a bend engrailed Gules a bendlet of the field. Supporters Two lions rampant guardant Proper. Motto Progredere Ne Regredere (Advance, Recede Not)

Baronetage of the United Kingdom
Preceded by Coffin baronets	Honyman baronets of Armadale; 12 May 1804	Succeeded by Sullivan baronets
