= Heineman =

Heineman is a surname. Notable people with the surname include:

- Benjamin W. Heineman (1914–2012), American railroad executive
- Benjamin W. Heineman, Jr. (born 1944), American journalist, lawyer and business executive
- Dannie Heineman (1872–1962), Belgian-American engineer and businessman
  - Dannie Heineman Prize for Astrophysics
  - Dannie Heineman Prize for Mathematical Physics
- Dave Heineman (born 1948), American politician from Nebraska
- Emil Heineman (born 2001), Swedish ice hockey player
- Fred Heineman (1929–2010), American politician from North Carolina
- Laurie Heineman (born 1948), American actress and teacher
- Rebecca Heineman (1963–2025), American video game programmer
- Scott Heineman (born 1992), American baseball player
- Tyler Heineman (born 1991), American baseball player

== See also ==
- Heinemann (disambiguation)
- Jamie Hyneman
