= Andrew Honeyman =

Scottish priest (1619–1676)

Andrew Honeyman or Honyman (1619–1676) was a Scottish priest: he was Bishop of Orkney from 1664 until 1676.

== Life ==
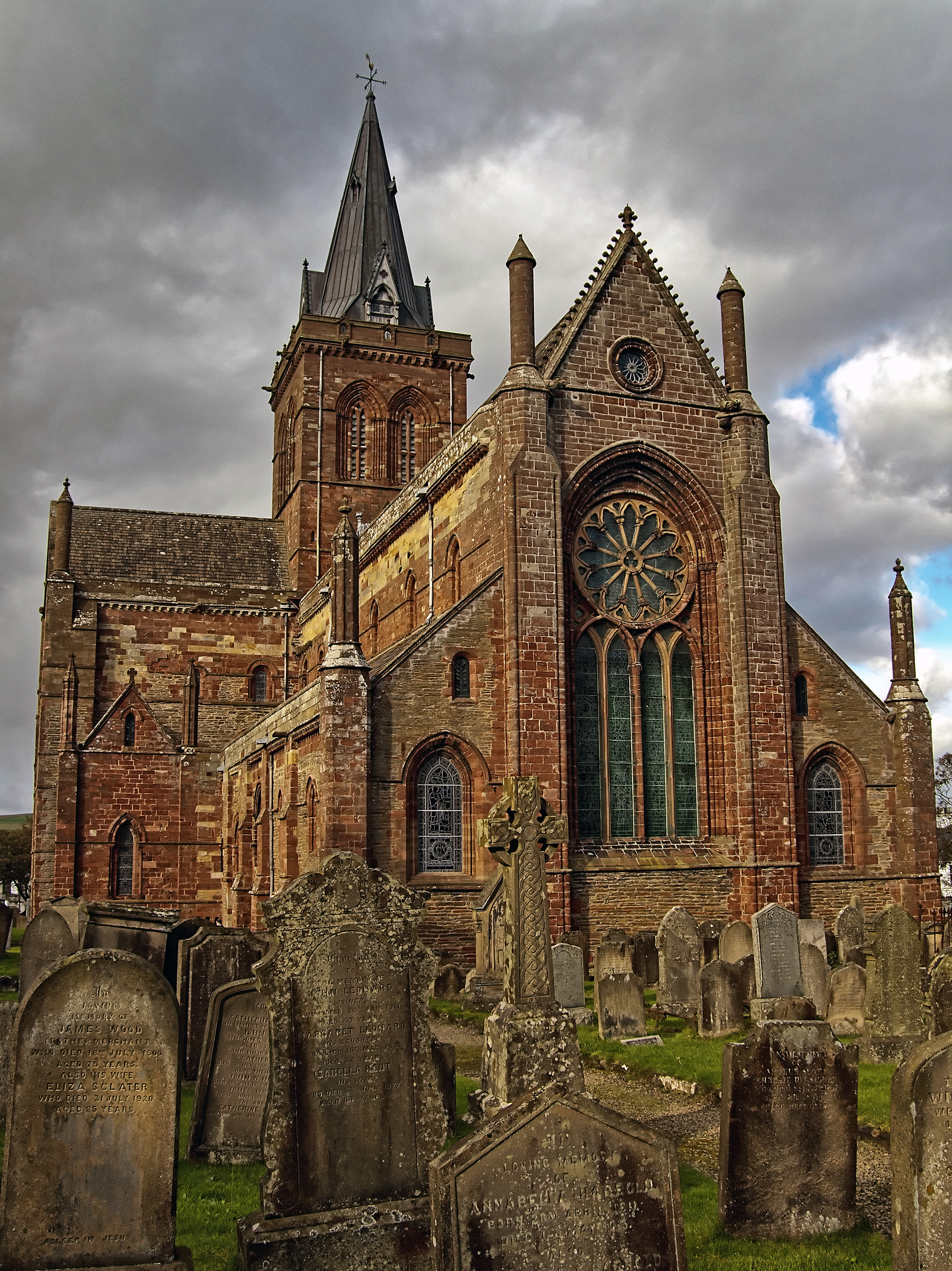
Kirkwall Cathedral

He was born in 1619, the son of David Honeyman of Pitairchney, a baker of St Andrews. His brother was Rev Dr Robert Honyman DD, minister of St Andrews.

He was a graduate of the University of St Andrews in 1635, and was presented to the parish of Ferry-Port on Craig in 1641.

In 1664 he succeeded Thomas Sydserf as Bishop of Orkney based at Kirkwall Cathedral.

Answering Naphtali, a Covenanter pamphlet of 1667, Honeyman became involved in a polemic exchange with James Stewart, one of the presumed authors.

Honeyman was injured in the arm during the assassination attempt made by James Mitchell on Honeyman's friend and colleague Archbishop James Sharp on 9 July 1668, which occurred on the Royal Mile in Edinburgh.

He died at Kirkwall on 21 February 1676. He is buried in Kirkwall Cathedral. His position as bishop was filled by Murdoch MacKenzie.

== Family ==
He married firstly Sept. 1642, Euphan (died 27 March 1668), daugh. of Samuel Cunningham, min. of Ferry-Port-on-Craig, and had issue – John; Robert, died 9 December 1679; Euphan (married 8 April 1669, Harry Graham of Breckness), died 17 Oct. 1686; Ann; Margaret (married 27 November 1673, William Craigie of Gairsay).

He married secondly 1668 Mary Stewart, heiress of Graemsay, daugh. of James Stewart of Graemsay (illegitimate grandson of King James V), and had issue - Euphan junior (married Patrick Graem) died 1763; Robert junior, ancestor of the Honyman Baronets of Armadale, died 17 April 1737.

His descendants included William Honyman, Lord Armadale.

== Bibliography ==
- The Seasonable Case of Submission to the Church (Government as now re-established by Law (Edinburgh, 1662)
- A Survey of the Insolent and Infamous Libel entitled " Naphtali," 2 parts (Edinburgh, 1668–9)
- Bourignonism displayed in a Discovery and Brief Refutation of . . . Errors maintained by Antonia Bourignon

[anon.] (Aberdeen, 1710).

- Craven's Scots Worthies, 127
- Catalog. Edinburgh Univ. Library, ii., 411.

== Notes ==
- born 1619, son of David H. of Pitairchney, baker in St Andrews, and brother of Robert Honeyman, D.D., min. of St Andrews *educated at Univ. of St Andrews; M.A.(1635);
- adm. assistant at Ferry-Port-on-Craig before 6 Oct. 1640;
- trans, to Second Charge, St Andrews, 24 November 1642;
- trans, to First Charge 2 Oct. 1662;
- promoted from Archdeaconry of St Andrews, app. to this See 14 January and 7 March, and consecrated (at St Andrews)

11 April 1664.

- While in Edinburgh, and in company of Archbishop Sharp, on the evening of 11 July 1668, and stepping into a coach at the top of Blackfriars Wynd, he was shot with a poisoned bullet intended for the Archbishop, by James Mitchell, which ultimately caused his death;

died at Kirkwall 21 Feb. 1676.

Religious titles
Preceded by Thomas Sydserf	Bishop of Orkney; 1664–1676	Succeeded by Murdoch MacKenzie
