= Heinemann =

Heinemann may refer to:

- Heinemann (surname)
- Heinemann (publisher), a publishing company
- Heinemann Park, a.k.a. Pelican Stadium in New Orleans, Louisiana, United States
- Gebr. Heinemann, a German distributing and retailing company

== See also ==
- Heineman
- Jamie Hyneman
