= Robert Honyman (British Army officer) =

Colonel Robert Honyman (c. 1781 – 20 November 1808) was a British Army officer from Orkney, Scotland, who briefly held office as the Member of Parliament (MP) for Orkney and Shetland.

Honyman was born in about 1781, the oldest child of the lawyer William Honyman (later the Lord of Session Lord Armadale) and his wife Mary, the daughter of Lord Braxfield.

He served as major in Reay’s Fencibles from 1794 to 1798, and was then on half-pay with the Yorkshire Fusiliers until 1802. He served as a volunteer during the Napoleonic Campaign in Egypt, where he impressed senior officers including Sir John Moore.

He was brevet Lieutenant Colonel in 1802, and the following year was a major in the 93rd Foot, which he led in 1806 in the successful attack on the Cape of Good Hope under Sir David Baird. He was severely wounded in the attack.

In 1806 he was promoted to Lieutenant Colonel of the 18th Foot.

Later that year he returned to Orkney, where at the general election in December 1806 he was returned unopposed in his father's interest as MP for Orkney and Shetland. With his father's influence in Orkney facing a severe challenge, he served only one term, and did not contest the next election in June 1807. Like his uncle Robert, who preceded him as MP, he was away on active service for much of his time in office, and there is no record of him having voted or spoken in the House of Commons.

In 1807 he was involved in the suppression of a mutiny of black troops in Jamaica, where he died of fever on 20 November 1808.

Parliament of the United Kingdom
Preceded by Robert Honyman I	Member of Parliament for Orkney and Shetland; 1806 – 1807	Succeeded by Malcolm Laing
