= Robert Honyman (Royal Navy officer) =

Scottish Royal Navy Admiral (c. 1765–1848)

Admiral Robert Honyman
- Born: c. 1765
- Died: 31 July 1848; Paris, France
- Military career
- Allegiance: United Kingdom
- Branch: Royal Navy
- Rank: Admiral
- Commands: HMS Garland; HMS Topaze; HMS Leda; HMS Ardent; HMS Sceptre; HMS Marlborough
- Conflicts: French Revolutionary Wars; Napoleonic Wars

Admiral Robert Honyman (c. 1765 – 31 July 1848) was a Scottish admiral in the British Royal Navy who served in the French Revolutionary Wars and in the Napoleonic Wars. A native of Orkney, he also held office for ten years as a member of parliament (MP) for Orkney and Shetland.

== Early life and family ==
Honyman was born in about 1765, the oldest son of Patrick Honyman of Graemsay, Orkney. His mother Margaret, a daughter of Patrick Sinclair of Durwin, was his father's second wife. His older half-brother William Honyman, Lord Armadale was a Lord of Justiciary. The family claimed maternal descent from Sir Robert Stewart, an illegitimate son of King James V of Scotland.

He married before 1808 Margaret Henrietta Knight, the granddaughter of Admiral Sir John Knight. They had one son and one daughter.

== Royal Navy ==
Honyman joined the Royal Navy in 1782, becoming a midshipman in 1783, and being promoted to lieutenant in 1790. While serving under Captain Theophilus Jones on HMS Defiance in 1796, he was promoted to commander, and commanded the sloop Tsiphone in 1797 when she captured the French privateers Le Cerf Volant and Le Prospere. He was promoted to post-captain in December 1798.

In 1800 Honynman took command of HMS Garland, initially on service in the English Channel. He sailed Garland to the Caribbean Sea in June 1801, bringing Rear-Admiral Robert Montagu to Jamaica, where the ship was wrecked the following year. Honyman returned to England in October 1802 in command of HMS Topaze.

In early 1803 he took command of the 38-gun frigate HMS Leda, taking part in several engagements of the Napoleonic Wars. In 1806 Honyman took Leda on Sir Home Popham's squadron in the occupation of the Cape of Good Hope, and crossed the South Atlantic to take part in the unsuccessful invasion of the Río de la Plata. Leda returned to England in late 1807, and on 31 January 1808 she was wrecked in a storm near the entrance to Milford Haven. Honyman was court martialled for the loss of his ship, but he and his crew acquitted of all blame.

Honyman then commanded the 64-gun HMS Ardent, and two successive 74-gun ships HMS Sceptre and Marlborough. He retired from active service in the navy in 1816, and was promoted to Rear Admiral of the Blue in 1825, Vice Admiral of the Blue in 1837, and full Admiral of the Blue in 1847.

== Parliament ==
In the 1780s, Honyman's father Patrick had passed the family estates to Robert's older half-brother William, a successful lawyer whose career had advanced under the patronage of the Tory minister Henry Dundas (later Lord Melville). Orkney's electoral politics were in flux, as William expanded challenged the power of the previously dominant family of Sir Lawrence Dundas of Kerse, who in 1766 had bought out the Earl of Morton's estates and privileges in Orkney. Sir Lawrence's son Sir Thomas, who succeeded his father in 1781, had neglected his Orkney estates and also fallen out with the Balfours of Trenabie.

Sir Thomas's cousin Colonel Thomas Dundas had won the Orkney and Shetland seat in 1784. However at the 1790 election, the Balfours and Honymans combined to oust Col Thomas, electing John Balfour by 19 votes to Dundas's 13. However, Balfour felt let down by the lack of the government patronage which he had expected in return for his support, and refused to stand again. After much negotiation, William Honyman put forward Robert, who was returned unopposed. At the next election, in 1802 Robert was again returned unopposed in William's interest, this time in his absence.

Robert was on active service with the navy for nearly all his decade in Parliament, and appears to have never voted or spoken in the House of Commons. He stood down at the 1806 election, when his nephew Robert Honyman (Sir William's oldest son) was elected unopposed.

== Death ==
Honyman died in Paris on 31 July 1848.

Parliament of Great Britain
Preceded by John Balfour	Member of Parliament for Orkney and Shetland; 1796 – 1800	Succeeded by Parliament of the United Kingdom
Parliament of the United Kingdom
Preceded by Parliament of Great Britain	Member of Parliament for Orkney and Shetland; 1801 – 1806	Succeeded by Robert Honyman II
