= 1921 Orkney and Shetland by-election =

UK parliamentary by-election

The 1921 Orkney and Shetland by-election was a parliamentary by-election held for the British House of Commons constituency of Orkney and Shetland on 17 May 1921.

== Vacancy ==
The by-election was caused by the death in London on 19 April 1921 of the sitting Coalition Liberal MP, Cathcart Wason. Wason had represented Orkney and Shetland since the 1900 general election. At the 1918 general election he had been returned unopposed, having been awarded the Coalition coupon.

== Candidates ==
The Coalition Liberals selected Sir Malcolm Smith, an ex-chief magistrate of Leith and a native of Shetland with large commercial interests in the islands. The Unionists did not seek to oppose their Coalition allies, although there was a strong expectation that the Independent Liberals would put up a candidate. There was no Labour Party tradition in the seat at that time. The Asquithian Liberals selected Sir Robert Hamilton, a judge in the East Africa Protectorate, as their candidate but he withdrew his candidature.

== Result ==
The field having been left free for Smith by the other parties, he was returned unopposed. However, Smith held the seat only until the 1922 general election when he did face a challenge from Hamilton who emerged the winner by a majority of 625 votes.

Orkney and Shetland by-election, 1921
Party		Candidate	Votes	%	±%
C	Liberal	Malcolm Smith	Unopposed		
	Liberal hold				
C indicates candidate endorsed by the coalition government.

== See also ==
- Lists of United Kingdom by-elections
- United Kingdom by-election records
