= 1873 Orkney and Shetland by-election =

UK Parliamentary by-election

The 1873 Orkney and Shetland by-election was fought on 6–7 January 1873. The by-election was fought due to the Death of the incumbent MP of the Liberal Party, Frederick Dundas. It was won by the Liberal candidate, former Financial Secretary to the Treasury and Railway Administrator Samuel Laing.
