= James Halyburton (Orkney and Shetland MP) =

James Halyburton (died 1765) of Pitcur in Angus and Firth, Orkney was a Scottish soldier and politician.

The oldest son of James Halyburton of Pitcur (died 1747), he joined the British Army in 1721 as an ensign in the 13th Foot, rising to the rank of Lieutenant-Colonel in 1750.

At the 1747 general election Halyburton was returned by his brother-in-law the 15th Earl of Morton as the Member of Parliament (MP) for Orkney and Shetland. He held the seat until the 1754 election.

Parliament of Great Britain
Preceded by Robert Douglas	Member of Parliament for Orkney and Shetland; 1747–1754	Succeeded by James Douglas
