= Orkney and Shetland (UK Parliament constituency) =

Coordinates: 59.775°N 1.803°W

- County constituency for the House of Commons
- Location of Orkney and Shetland in Scotland
- Subdivision: Orkney and Shetland
- Electorate: 34,824 (March 2020)
- Major settlements: Kirkwall, Lerwick

Current constituency
- Created: 1708
- Member of Parliament: Alistair Carmichael (Liberal Democrats)
- Seats: One
- Created from: Orkney and Shetland

Orkney and Shetland (Scottish Gaelic: Arcaibh agus Sealtainn) is a constituency of the House of Commons of the Parliament of the United Kingdom. It elects one Member of Parliament (MP) by the first past the post system of election and has been represented by Alistair Carmichael of the Scottish Liberal Democrats since 2001. In the Scottish Parliament, Orkney and Shetland are separate constituencies. The constituency was historically known as Orkney and Zetland (an alternative name for Shetland).

In the 2014 Scottish independence referendum, 65.4% of the constituency's electors voted for Scotland to stay part of the United Kingdom.

== Creation ==
The British parliamentary constituency was created in 1708 following the Acts of Union, 1707 and replaced the former Parliament of Scotland shire constituency of Orkney & Zetland.

== Boundaries ==
The constituency is made up of the two northernmost island groups of Scotland, Orkney and Shetland. A constituency of this name has existed continuously since 1708. However, before 1918 the town of Kirkwall (the capital of Orkney) formed part of the Northern Burghs constituency. It is the most northerly of the 650 UK Parliament constituencies.

The constituency is one of five "protected constituencies", the others being Na h-Eileanan an Iar, two on the Isle of Wight, and Ynys Môn, defined exclusively by geography rather than by size of electorate. The constituency contains the areas of the Orkney Islands Council and the Shetland Islands Council. Before 2011 the constituency had been unique in having its boundaries protected by legislation.

The constituency has the second smallest electorate of any UK parliamentary constituency, after Na h-Eileanan an Iar.

== History ==
The constituency has elected one Member of Parliament (MP) by the first past the post since its creation in 1707.

Although called Orkney and Shetland, prior to the Scottish Reform Act 1832 there were no eligible voters from Shetland. This was due to the land tenure and valuation structures used in Shetland, which meant no-one could show that they met the property qualification to be eligible to vote. This was a source of resentment in Shetland; its residents made several attempts to argue that some different form of valuation should be acceptable to show eligibility, but they were unsuccessful until the wider reforms of 1832.

The constituency has remained largely unchanged since its creation. The town of Kirkwall was added in 1918, having previously been part of Wick Burghs.

== Members of Parliament ==
The constituency has elected only Liberal and Liberal Democrat MPs since 1950; the longest run of any British parliamentary constituency. At each general election from 1955 until 1979, in 1987, 2010 and again in 2017 it was the safest Liberal Democrat seat in the UK. At the 2015 general election, it was the only seat in Scotland to return a Liberal Democrat MP.

Year	Member	Party
1707	Sir Alexander Douglas	
1713	George Douglas	
1715	James Moodie	
1722	George Douglas	
1730 by-election	Robert Douglas	
1747	James Halyburton	
1754	James Douglas	
1768	Thomas Dundas I	
1771 by-election	Thomas Dundas II	
1780	Robert Baikie	
1781	Charles Dundas	
1784	Thomas Dundas II	
1790	John Balfour	Tory
1796	Capt. Robert Honyman I	
1806	Col. Robert Honyman II	
1807	Malcolm Laing	Whig
1812	Richard Honyman	Whig
1818	George Dundas	Whig
1820	John Balfour	
1826	George Dundas	Whig
1830	George Traill	Whig
1835	Thomas Balfour	Conservative
1837	Frederick Dundas	Whig
1847	Arthur Anderson	Whig
1852	Frederick Dundas	Whig
1859	Frederick Dundas	Liberal
1873 by-election	Samuel Laing	Liberal
1885	Leonard Lyell	Liberal
1900	Cathcart Wason	Liberal Unionist
1902 by-election	Cathcart Wason	Independent Liberal
1906	Cathcart Wason	Liberal
1916	Cathcart Wason	Coalition Liberal
1921 by-election	Malcolm Smith	Coalition Liberal
Jan 1922	Malcolm Smith	National Liberal
Nov 1922	Robert Hamilton	Liberal
1935	Basil Neven-Spence	Unionist
1950	Jo Grimond	Liberal
1983	Jim Wallace	Liberal
1988	Jim Wallace	Liberal Democrat
2001	Alistair Carmichael	Liberal Democrat

== Elections ==
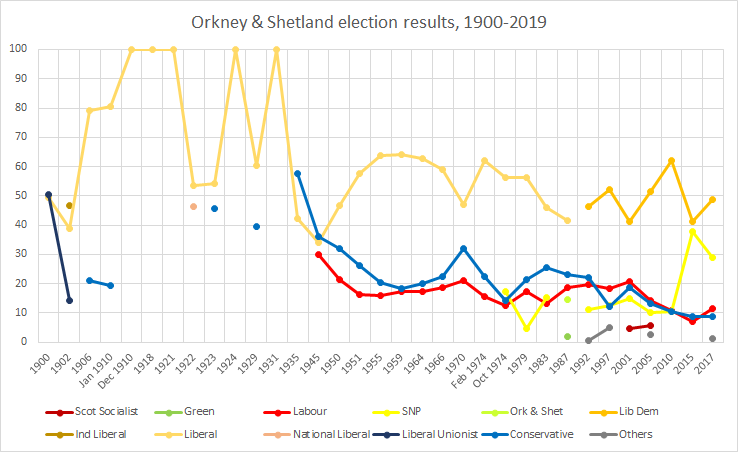
Orkney & Shetland election results

=== Elections in the 2020s ===
General election 2024: Orkney and Shetland
Party	Candidate	Votes	%	±%
Liberal Democrats	Alistair Carmichael	11,392	55.1	+10.3
SNP	Robert Leslie	3,585	17.3	−16.7
Green	Alex Armitage	2,046	9.9	New
Reform	Robert Smith	1,586	7.7	+3.8
Labour	Conor Savage	1,493	7.2	+0.5
Conservative	Shane Painter	586	2.8	−7.1
Majority		7,807	37.8	+27.0
Turnout		20,688	60.4	−7.3
Registered electors		34,236		
Liberal Democrats hold		Swing	+13.5	

=== Elections in the 2010s ===
General election 2019: Orkney and Shetland
Party	Candidate	Votes	%	±%
Liberal Democrats	Alistair Carmichael	10,381	44.8	−3.8
SNP	Robert Leslie	7,874	34.0	+5.0
Conservative	Jenny Fairbairn	2,287	9.9	+1.2
Labour	Coilla Drake	1,550	6.7	−4.7
Brexit Party	Robert Smith	900	3.9	New
Independent	David Barnard	168	0.7	New
Majority		2,507	10.8	−8.8
Turnout		23,160	67.7	−0.4
Liberal Democrats hold		Swing	−4.4	

General election 2017: Orkney and Shetland
Party	Candidate	Votes	%	±%
Liberal Democrats	Alistair Carmichael	11,312	48.6	+7.2
SNP	Miriam Brett	6,749	29.0	−8.8
Labour	Robina Barton	2,664	11.4	+4.3
Conservative	Jamie Halcro Johnston	2,024	8.7	−0.2
UKIP	Robert Smith	283	1.2	−3.6
Independent	Stuart Hill	245	1.1	New
Majority		4,563	19.6	+16.0
Turnout		23,277	68.1	+2.3
Liberal Democrats hold		Swing	+8.0	

General election 2015: Orkney and Shetland
Party	Candidate	Votes	%	±%
Liberal Democrats	Alistair Carmichael	9,407	41.4	−20.6
SNP	Danus Skene	8,590	37.8	+27.2
Conservative	Donald Cameron	2,025	8.9	−1.6
Labour	Gerry McGarvey	1,624	7.1	−3.6
UKIP	Robert Smith	1,082	4.8	−1.5
Majority		817	3.6	−47.7
Turnout		22,728	65.8	+7.3
Liberal Democrats hold		Swing	−23.9	

General election 2010: Orkney and Shetland
Party	Candidate	Votes	%	±%
Liberal Democrats	Alistair Carmichael	11,989	62.0	+10.5
Labour	Mark Cooper	2,061	10.7	−3.5
SNP	John Mowat	2,042	10.6	+0.3
Conservative	Frank Nairn	2,032	10.5	−2.8
UKIP	Robert Smith	1,222	6.3	+3.9
Majority		9,928	51.3	+14.0
Turnout		19,346	58.5	+4.8
Liberal Democrats hold		Swing	+7.0	

=== Elections in the 2000s ===
General election 2005: Orkney and Shetland
Party	Candidate	Votes	%	±%
Liberal Democrats	Alistair Carmichael	9,138	51.5	+10.2
Labour	Richard Meade	2,511	14.2	−6.4
Conservative	Frank Nairn	2,357	13.3	−5.4
SNP	John Mowat	1,833	10.3	−4.5
Scottish Socialist	John Aberdein	992	5.6	+1.0
UKIP	Scott Dyble	424	2.4	New
Legalise Cannabis	Paul Cruickshank	311	1.8	New
Free Scotland Party	Brian Nugent	176	1.0	New
Majority		6,627	37.3	+16.6
Turnout		17,742	53.7	+1.3
Liberal Democrats hold		Swing	+8.3	

General election 2001: Orkney and Shetland
Party	Candidate	Votes	%	±%
Liberal Democrats	Alistair Carmichael	6,919	41.3	−10.7
Labour	Robert Mochrie	3,444	20.6	+2.3
Conservative	John Firth	3,121	18.7	+6.5
SNP	John Mowat	2,473	14.8	+2.1
Scottish Socialist	Peter Andrews	776	4.6	New
Majority		3,475	20.7	−13.0
Turnout		16,733	52.4	−11.6
Liberal Democrats hold		Swing	−13.0	

=== Elections in the 1990s ===
General election 1997: Orkney and Shetland
Party	Candidate	Votes	%	±%
Liberal Democrats	Jim Wallace	10,743	52.0	+5.6
Labour	James Paton	3,775	18.3	−1.5
SNP	Willie Ross	2,624	12.7	+1.5
Conservative	Hope Anderson	2,527	12.2	−9.8
Referendum	Francis Adamson	820	4.0	New
Natural Law	Christian Wharton	116	0.6	0.0
Independent	Arthur Robertson	60	0.3	New
Majority		6,968	33.7	+10.3
Turnout		20,665	64.0	−1.5
Liberal Democrats hold		Swing	+3.6	

General election 1992: Orkney and Shetland
Party	Candidate	Votes	%	±%
Liberal Democrats	Jim Wallace	9,575	46.4	+4.7
Conservative	Paul McCormick	4,542	22.0	−1.3
Labour	John Aberdein	4,093	19.8	+1.1
SNP	Frances McKie	2,301	11.2	New
Natural Law	Christian Wharton	115	0.6	New
Majority		5,033	24.4	+6.0
Turnout		20,626	65.5	−3.2
Liberal Democrats hold		Swing	+3.0	

=== Elections in the 1980s ===
General election 1987: Orkney and Shetland
Party	Candidate	Votes	%	±%
Liberal	Jim Wallace	8,881	41.7	−4.2
Conservative	Richard Jenkins	4,959	23.3	−2.3
Labour	John Aberdein	3,995	18.7	+5.6
Orkney and Shetland Movement	John Goodlad	3,095	14.5	New
Green	Grierson Collister	389	1.8	New
Majority		3,922	18.4	−1.9
Turnout		21,319	68.7	−0.1
Liberal hold		Swing		

General election 1983: Orkney and Shetland
Party	Candidate	Votes	%	±%
Liberal	Jim Wallace	9,374	45.9	−10.5
Conservative	David Myles	5,224	25.6	+4.3
SNP	Winifred Ewing	3,147	15.4	+10.6
Labour	Robina Goodlad	2,665	13.1	−4.3
Majority		4,150	20.3	−14.8
Turnout		20,410	67.8	+0.6
Liberal hold		Swing		

=== Elections in the 1970s ===
General election 1979: Orkney and Shetland
Party	Candidate	Votes	%	±%
Liberal	Jo Grimond	10,950	56.4	+0.2
Conservative	Charles Donaldson	4,140	21.3	+7.1
Labour	Robina Goodlad	3,385	17.4	+5.0
SNP	Michael Spens	935	4.8	−12.4
Majority		6,810	35.1	−3.9
Turnout		19,410	67.2	+0.4
Liberal hold		Swing	−3.5	

General election October 1974: Orkney and Shetland
Party	Candidate	Votes	%	±%
Liberal	Jo Grimond	9,877	56.2	−5.8
SNP	Howard Firth	3,025	17.2	New
Conservative	Raymond M. Fraser	2,495	14.2	−8.4
Labour	Jonathan W. G. Wills	2,175	12.4	−3.1
Majority		6,852	39.0	−0.4
Turnout		17,572	66.8	−4.3
Liberal hold		Swing	−11.5	

General election February 1974: Orkney and Shetland
Party	Candidate	Votes	%	±%
Liberal	Jo Grimond	11,491	62.0	+15.0
Conservative	John L. Firth	4,186	22.6	−9.3
Labour	Jonathan W. G. Wills	2,865	15.5	−5.6
Majority		7,305	39.4	+24.3
Turnout		18,542	71.1	+5.5
Liberal hold		Swing	+12.2	

General election 1970: Orkney and Shetland
Party	Candidate	Votes	%	±%
Liberal	Jo Grimond	7,896	47.0	−12.1
Conservative	John L. Firth	5,364	31.9	+9.6
Labour	William Macpherson Reid	3,552	21.1	+2.5
Majority		2,532	15.1	−21.7
Turnout		16,812	65.6	+0.4
Liberal hold		Swing	−10.9	

=== Elections in the 1960s ===
General election 1966: Orkney and Shetland
Party	Candidate	Votes	%	±%
Liberal	Jo Grimond	9,605	59.1	−3.5
Unionist	John L. Firth	3,630	22.3	+2.3
Labour	Hugh Lynch	3,021	18.6	+1.2
Majority		5,975	36.8	−5.8
Turnout		16,256	65.2	−7.5
Liberal hold		Swing		

General election 1964: Orkney and Shetland
Party	Candidate	Votes	%	±%
Liberal	Jo Grimond	11,604	62.6	−1.5
Unionist	John L. Firth	3,704	20.0	+1.5
Labour	Ian MacInnes	3,232	17.4	±0.0
Majority		7,900	42.6	−3.0
Turnout		18,540	72.7	+1.4
Liberal hold		Swing		

=== Elections in the 1950s ===
General election 1959: Orkney and Shetland
Party	Candidate	Votes	%	±%
Liberal	Jo Grimond	12,099	64.1	+0.3
Unionist	Robert Hunter Wingate Bruce	3,487	18.5	−1.9
Labour	Robert S. McGowan	3,275	17.4	+1.6
Majority		8,612	45.6	+2.2
Turnout		18,861	71.3	+5.2
Liberal hold		Swing		

General election 1955: Orkney and Shetland
Party	Candidate	Votes	%	±%
Liberal	Jo Grimond	11,753	63.8	+6.3
Unionist	John W. Eunson	3,760	20.4	−6.2
Labour	Edgar Ramsay	2,914	15.8	−0.4
Majority		7,993	43.4	+12.1
Turnout		18,427	66.1	−2.9
Liberal hold		Swing		

General election 1951: Orkney and Shetland
Party	Candidate	Votes	%	±%
Liberal	Jo Grimond	11,745	57.5	+10.7
Unionist	Archibald Tennant	5,354	26.2	−5.7
Labour	Magnus A. Fairnie	3,335	16.2	−3.1
Majority		6,391	31.3	+16.4
Turnout		20,434	69.0	+1.4
Liberal hold		Swing		

General election 1950: Orkney and Shetland
Party	Candidate	Votes	%	±%
Liberal	Jo Grimond	9,237	46.8	+12.6
Unionist	Basil Neven-Spence	6,281	31.9	−4.1
Labour	Harald Leslie	3,335	21.3	−8.5
Majority		2,956	14.9	N/A
Turnout		19,716	67.7	+12.2
Liberal gain from Unionist		Swing		

=== Elections in the 1940s ===
General election 1945: Orkney and Shetland
Party	Candidate	Votes	%	±%
Unionist	Basil Neven-Spence	6,304	36.0	−21.6
Liberal	Jo Grimond	5,975	34.2	−8.2
Labour	Prophet Smith	5,208	29.8	New
Majority		329	1.8	−13.4
Turnout		17,487	55.5	+9.2
Unionist hold		Swing		

=== Elections in the 1930s ===
General election 1939–40: Another general election was required to take place before the end of 1940. The political parties had been making preparations for an election to take place and by the Autumn of 1939, the following candidates had been selected;

- Conservative: Basil Neven-Spence
- Liberal: Louise Glen-Coats

General election 1935: Orkney and Shetland
Party	Candidate	Votes	%	±%
Unionist	Basil Neven-Spence	8,406	57.6	N/A
Liberal	Robert Hamilton	6,180	42.4	N/A
Majority		2,226	15.2	N/A
Turnout		14,586	46.3	N/A
Unionist gain from Liberal		Swing	N/A	

General election 1931: Orkney and Shetland
Party	Candidate	Votes	%	±%
Liberal	Robert Hamilton	Unopposed		
Liberal hold				

=== Elections in the 1920s ===
General election 1929: Orkney and Shetland
Party	Candidate	Votes	%	±%
Liberal	Robert Hamilton	8,256	60.4	N/A
Unionist	Basil Neven-Spence	5,404	39.6	N/A
Majority		2,852	20.8	N/A
Turnout		13,660	43.1	N/A
Liberal hold		Swing	N/A	

General election 1924: Orkney and Shetland
Party	Candidate	Votes	%	±%
Liberal	Robert Hamilton	Unopposed		
Liberal hold				

General election 1923: Orkney and Shetland
Party	Candidate	Votes	%	±%
Liberal	Robert Hamilton	5,129	54.3	+0.8
Unionist	Robert Boothby	4,318	45.7	New
Majority		811	8.6	+1.6
Turnout		9,447	39.1	+1.7
Liberal hold		Swing		

Hamilton

General election 1922: Orkney and Shetland
Party	Candidate	Votes	%	±%
Liberal	Robert Hamilton	4,814	53.5	N/A
National Liberal	Malcolm Smith	4,189	46.5	N/A
Majority		625	7.0	N/A
Turnout		9,003	37.4	N/A
Liberal gain from National Liberal		Swing	N/A	

1921 Orkney and Shetland by-election
Party		Candidate	Votes	%	±%
C	National Liberal	Malcolm Smith	Unopposed		
	National Liberal hold				
C indicates candidate endorsed by the coalition government.

=== Elections in the 1910s ===
General election 1918: Orkney and Shetland
Party		Candidate	Votes	%	±%
C	National Liberal	Cathcart Wason	Unopposed		
	National Liberal hold				
C indicates candidate endorsed by the coalition government.

General election December 1910: Orkney and Shetland
Party	Candidate	Votes	%	±%
Liberal	Cathcart Wason	Unopposed		
Liberal hold				

Cathcart Wason

General election January 1910: Orkney and Shetland
Party	Candidate	Votes	%	±%
Liberal	Cathcart Wason	4,117	80.6	+1.6
Liberal Unionist	Thomas William Hemsley	994	19.4	−1.6
Majority		3,123	61.2	+3.2
Turnout		5,111	71.8	+8.5
Liberal hold		Swing		

=== Elections in the 1900s ===
General election 1906: Orkney and Shetland
Party	Candidate	Votes	%	±%
Liberal	Cathcart Wason	3,837	79.0	+29.5
Conservative	C. J. Dunlop	1,021	21.0	−21.5
Majority		2,816	58.0	N/A
Turnout		4,858	63.3	+8.4
Registered electors		7,680		
Liberal gain from Liberal Unionist		Swing	+29.5	

McKinnon Wood

1902 Orkney and Shetland by-election
Party	Candidate	Votes	%	±%
Independent Liberal	Cathcart Wason	2,412	46.8	+46.8
Liberal	McKinnon Wood	2,001	38.8	−10.7
Liberal Unionist	Theodore Vivian Samuel Angier	740	14.4	−36.1
Majority		411	8.0	N/A
Turnout		5,153	68.1	+13.2
Registered electors		7,572		
Independent Liberal gain from Liberal Unionist		Swing		

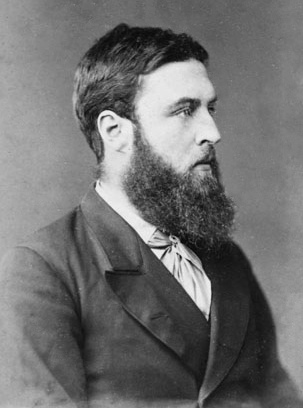
Cathcart Wason

General election 1900: Orkney and Shetland
Party	Candidate	Votes	%	±%
Liberal Unionist	Cathcart Wason	2,057	50.5	+10.4
Liberal	Leonard Lyell	2,017	49.5	−10.4
Majority		40	1.0	N/A
Turnout		4,074	54.9	−1.0
Registered electors		7,420		
Liberal Unionist gain from Liberal		Swing	+10.4	

=== Elections in the 1890s ===
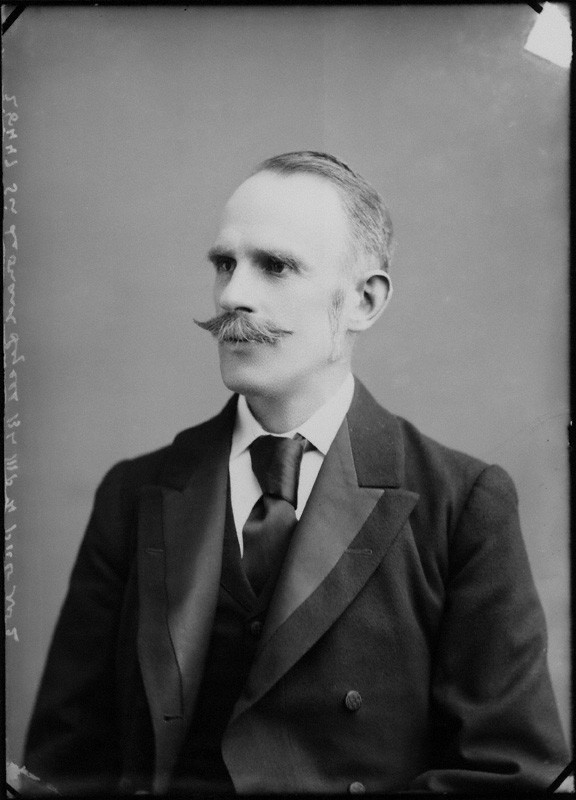
Lyell

General election 1895: Orkney and Shetland
Party	Candidate	Votes	%	±%
Liberal	Leonard Lyell	2,361	59.9	−2.0
Liberal Unionist	Ralph Wardlaw MacLeod Fullarton	1,580	40.1	+2.0
Majority		781	19.8	−4.0
Turnout		3,941	55.9	−4.0
Registered electors		7,053		
Liberal hold		Swing	−2.0	

General election 1892: Orkney and Shetland
Party	Candidate	Votes	%	±%
Liberal	Leonard Lyell	2,624	61.9	−1.1
Liberal Unionist	William Younger	1,617	38.1	+1.1
Majority		1,007	23.8	−2.2
Turnout		4,241	59.9	+9.4
Registered electors		7,075		
Liberal hold		Swing	−1.1	

=== Elections in the 1880s ===
General election 1886: Orkney and Shetland
Party	Candidate	Votes	%	±%
Liberal	Leonard Lyell	2,353	63.0	−0.3
Liberal Unionist	Henry Hoare	1,382	37.0	New
Majority		971	26.0	−0.6
Turnout		3,735	50.5	−21.1
Registered electors		7,394		
Liberal hold		Swing	−0.3	

General election 1885: Orkney and Shetland
Party	Candidate	Votes	%	±%
Liberal	Leonard Lyell	3,352	63.3	+2.5
Conservative	Cospatrick Thomas Dundas	1,940	36.7	−2.5
Majority		1,412	26.6	+5.0
Turnout		5,292	71.6	−14.9
Registered electors		7,394		
Liberal hold		Swing	+2.5	

General election 1880: Orkney and Shetland
Party	Candidate	Votes	%	±%
Liberal	Samuel Laing	896	60.8	N/A
Conservative	George Roy Badenoch	578	39.2	N/A
Majority		318	21.6	N/A
Turnout		1,474	86.5	N/A
Registered electors		1,704		
Liberal hold		Swing	N/A	

=== Elections in the 1870s ===
General election 1874: Orkney and Shetland
Party	Candidate	Votes	%	±%
Liberal	Samuel Laing	Unopposed		
Registered electors		1,618		
Liberal hold				

1873 Orkney and Shetland by-election
Party	Candidate	Votes	%	±%
Liberal	Samuel Laing	646	51.0	N/A
Liberal	Peter Tait	621	49.0	N/A
Majority		25	2.0	−21.2
Turnout		1,267	82.4	+4.3
Registered electors		1,537		
Liberal hold		Swing	N/A	

- Caused by Dundas' death.

=== Elections in the 1860s ===
General election 1868: Orkney and Shetland
Party	Candidate	Votes	%	±%
Liberal	Frederick Dundas	715	61.6	N/A
Conservative	Henry Riddell	446	38.4	N/A
Majority		269	23.2	N/A
Turnout		1,161	78.1	N/A
Registered electors		1,486		
Liberal hold		Swing	N/A	

General election 1865: Orkney and Shetland
Party	Candidate	Votes	%	±%
Liberal	Frederick Dundas	Unopposed		
Registered electors		685		
Liberal hold				

=== Elections in the 1850s ===
General election 1859: Orkney and Shetland
Party	Candidate	Votes	%	±%
Liberal	Frederick Dundas	Unopposed		
Registered electors		621		
Liberal hold				

General election 1857: Orkney and Shetland
Party	Candidate	Votes	%	±%
Whig	Frederick Dundas	Unopposed		
Registered electors		615		
Whig hold				

General election 1852: Orkney and Shetland
Party	Candidate	Votes	%	±%
Whig	Frederick Dundas	227	53.9	−46.1
Conservative	John Inglis	194	46.1	New
Majority		33	7.8	+1.2
Turnout		421	64.7	−0.7
Registered electors		651		
Whig hold		Swing		

=== Elections in the 1840s ===
General election 1847: Orkney and Shetland
Party	Candidate	Votes	%	±%
Whig	Arthur Anderson	209	53.3	N/A
Whig	Frederick Dundas	183	46.7	N/A
Majority		26	6.6	N/A
Turnout		392	65.4	N/A
Registered electors		599		
Whig hold		Swing	N/A	

General election 1841: Orkney and Shetland
Party	Candidate	Votes	%	±%
Whig	Frederick Dundas	Unopposed		
Registered electors		526		
Whig hold				

=== Elections in the 1830s ===
General election 1837: Orkney and Shetland
Party	Candidate	Votes	%
Whig	Frederick Dundas	Unopposed	
Registered electors		476	
Whig gain from Conservative			

General election 1835: Orkney and Shetland
Party	Candidate	Votes	%	±%
Conservative	Thomas Balfour	114	57.6	+12.3
Whig	George Traill	84	42.4	−6.1
Majority		30	15.2	
Turnout		198	66.4	−11.5
Registered electors		298		
Conservative gain from Whig		Swing	+9.2	

General election 1832: Orkney and Shetland
Party	Candidate	Votes	%
Whig	George Traill	107	50.5
Tory	Samuel Laing	96	45.3
Whig	Robert Hunter	9	4.2
Majority		11	5.2
Turnout		212	77.9
Registered electors		272	
Whig hold			

General election 1831: Orkney and Shetland
Party	Candidate	Votes	%
Whig	George Traill	Unopposed	
Registered electors		43	
Whig hold			

General election 1830: Orkney and Shetland
Party	Candidate	Votes	%
Whig	George Traill	Unopposed	
Registered electors		43	
Whig hold			
