= James Douglas, 14th Earl of Morton =

Scottish peer and astronomer (1702–1768)

The Right Honourable The Earl of Morton KT FRS
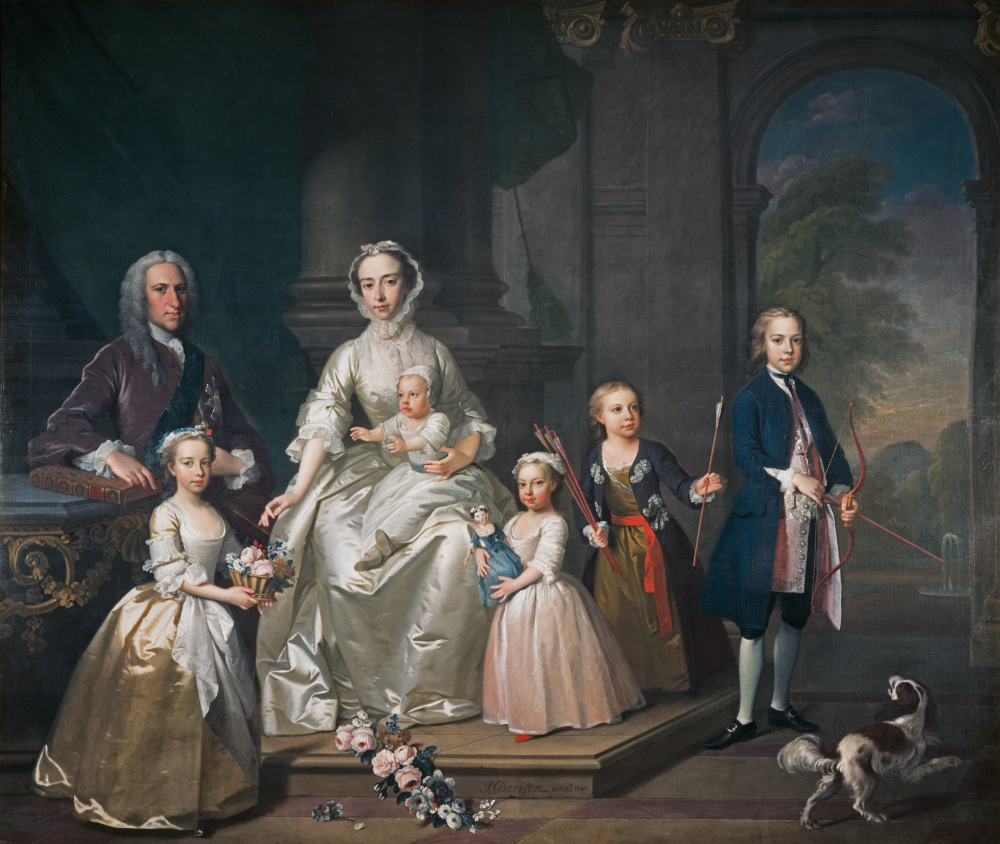
- Portrait of Douglas with his family by Jeremiah Davison, 1740

16th President of the Royal Society
- In office 1764–1768
- Preceded by: George Parker
- Succeeded by: James Burrow

Personal details
- Born: 1702 Edinburgh, Scotland, UK
- Died: 12 October 1768 (aged 65–66)

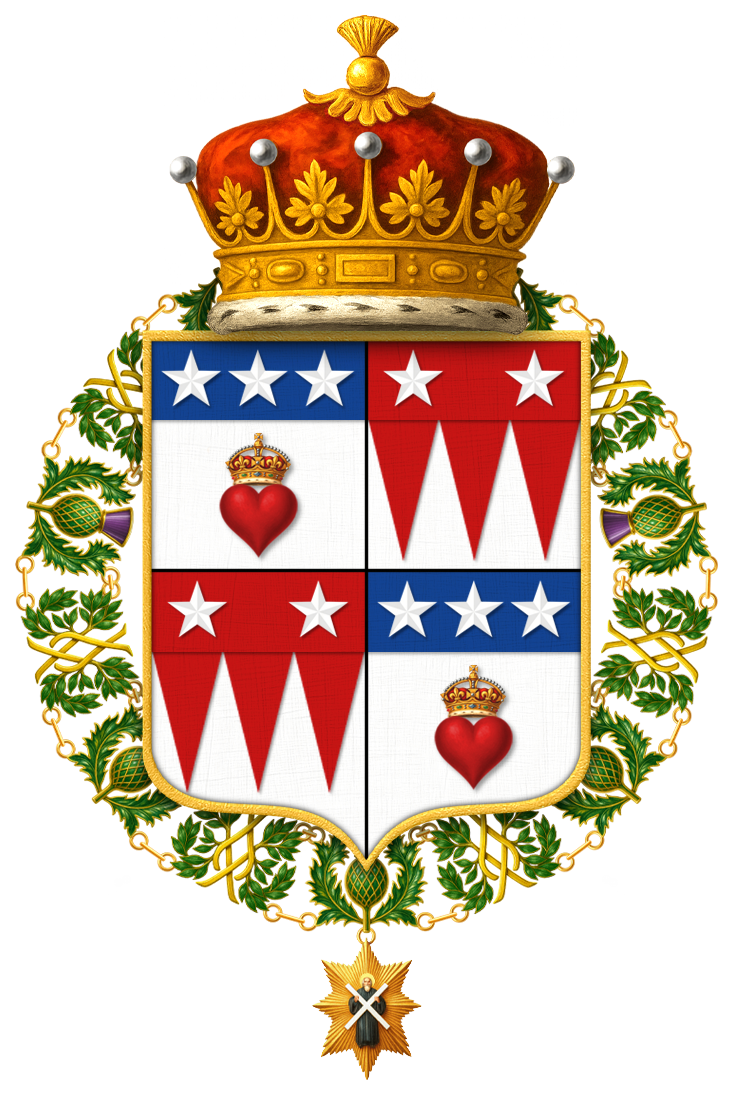
Shield of arms of James Douglas, 14th Earl of Morton, KT, FRS

James Douglas, 14th Earl of Morton, KT, FRS (1702 – 12 October 1768) was a Scottish peer and astronomer who was president of the Philosophical Society of Edinburgh from its foundation in 1737 until his death in 1768. He also became president of the Royal Society on 24 March 1764, and was a distinguished patron of science, and particularly of astronomy.

He was born in Edinburgh as the son of George Douglas, 13th Earl of Morton and his second wife Frances Adderley. He graduated MA from King's College, Cambridge, in 1722. In 1746 he visited France, and was imprisoned in the Bastille, probably as a Jacobite. He had a long lasting tendency to protest against the actions of the British government.

== Family ==
He was twice married: firstly to Agatha, daughter of James Halyburton of Pitcur, Forfarshire, by whom he was the father of three sons, two of whom died young, and three daughters. The second son, Sholto Douglas, 15th Earl of Morton, succeeded him. Secondly, on 31 July 1755, at St James's Church, Piccadilly, he married Bridget, daughter of Sir John Heathcote, Bt., of Normanton, who bore him a son, John (b. 4 July 1756), and a daughter, Bridget (b. 3 May 1758). His wife, Bridget, outlived him by thirty-seven years.

== Legacy ==
Moreton Bay in Queensland, Australia, was named after Lord Morton by Lieutenant James Cook (the spelling being an error in the published account of Cook's voyage in HMS Endeavour). Lord Morton had been influential in obtaining a grant of £4,000 to finance the voyage. With regards the native populations of the places he might visit, Cook was instructed by the Earl, with what are now called his "Hints":

"To check the petulance of the Sailors, and restrain the wanton use of Fire Arms.

To have it still in view that sheding the blood of those people is a crime of the highest nature – They are human creatures, the work of the same omnipotent Author, equally under his care with the most polished European perhaps being less offensive; more entitled to his favor.

They are the natural, and in the strictest sense of the word, the legal possessors of the several Regions they inhabit.

No European nation has the right to occupy any part of their country, or settle among them without their voluntary consent. Conquest over such people can give no just title: because they could never be the Aggressors."

== In popular media ==
Actor Brian Cox was cast as Lord Morton in the TV series, Longitude in 2000.

== See also ==
- List of presidents of the Royal Society

Masonic offices
Preceded by The Earl of Kintore	Grand Master of the Grand Lodge of Scotland; 1739–1740	Succeeded by The Earl of Strathmore and Kinghorne
Preceded by The Earl of Kintore	Grand Master of the Premier Grand Lodge of England; 1741–1742	Succeeded by The Lord Ward
Political offices
Preceded by Alexander Hume Campbell	Lord Clerk Register; 1760–1768	Succeeded by Lord Frederick Campbell
Peerage of Scotland
Preceded by George Douglas	Earl of Morton; 1738–1768	Succeeded by Sholto Douglas
Professional and academic associations
Preceded by George Parker	16th President of the Royal Society; 1764–1768	Succeeded by James Burrow
