= George Douglas, 13th Earl of Morton =

Scottish nobleman, soldier and politician (1662-1738)

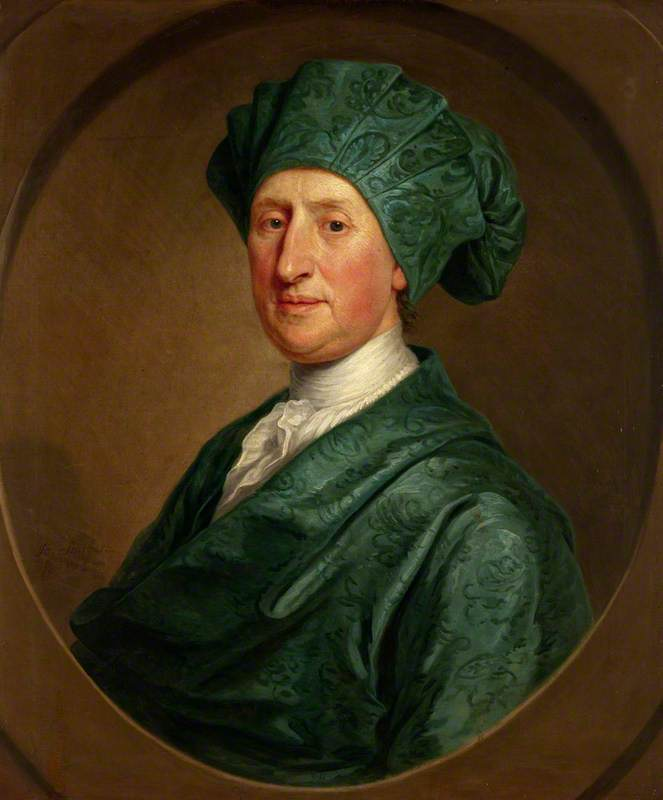
Portrait of George Douglas, 13th earl of Morton by John Smibert

George Douglas, 13th Earl of Morton (1662 – 4 January 1738), of St Ola, Orkney, styled The Honourable George Douglas between 1681 and 1730, was a Scottish nobleman, soldier and politician who sat in the House of Commons from 1708 until he succeeded to a peerage in 1730.

== Background ==
Douglas was a younger son of James Douglas, 10th Earl of Morton, and Anne, daughter of Sir James Hay, 1st Baronet.

He became a professional soldier in various Scottish regiments but was made redundant in 1707 following the Union of England and Scotland.

== Political career ==
Douglas was elected as Member of Parliament for Lanark Burghs, also known as Linlithgow Burgs, in 1708 and was returned there unopposed in 1710. In 1713 he was elected MP for Orkney and Shetland, although this was the first time that the constituency had been contested, usually going to the Morton interest. He was returned as MP for Lanark Burghs in 1715 when he was unopposed, but in the 1722 general election he was defeated there in a contest. However at the same general election he was also returned unopposed at Orkney where he was returned again in 1727. He surrendered his seat in 1730 when he succeeded his elder brother in the earldom and was elected a Scottish representative peer, which he remained until his death. He also served as Vice-Admiral of Scotland from 1733 to 1738.

== Family ==
Lord Morton married Frances Adderley. He died in January 1738 and was succeeded in his titles by his son, James.

Parliament of Great Britain
New constituency	Member of Parliament for Lanark Burghs; 1708–1713	Succeeded by Sir James Carmichael, Bt
Preceded by Sir Alexander Douglas	Member of Parliament for Orkney and Shetland; 1713–1715	Succeeded by James Moodie
Preceded by Sir James Carmichael, Bt	Member of Parliament for Lanark Burghs; 1715–1722	Succeeded by Daniel Weir
Preceded by James Moodie	Member of Parliament for Orkney and Shetland; 1722–1730	Succeeded by Robert Douglas
Peerage of Scotland
Preceded by Robert Douglas	Earl of Morton; 1730–1738	Succeeded by James Douglas
