= Hamilton Douglas Halyburton =

The Honourable Hamilton Douglas Halyburton
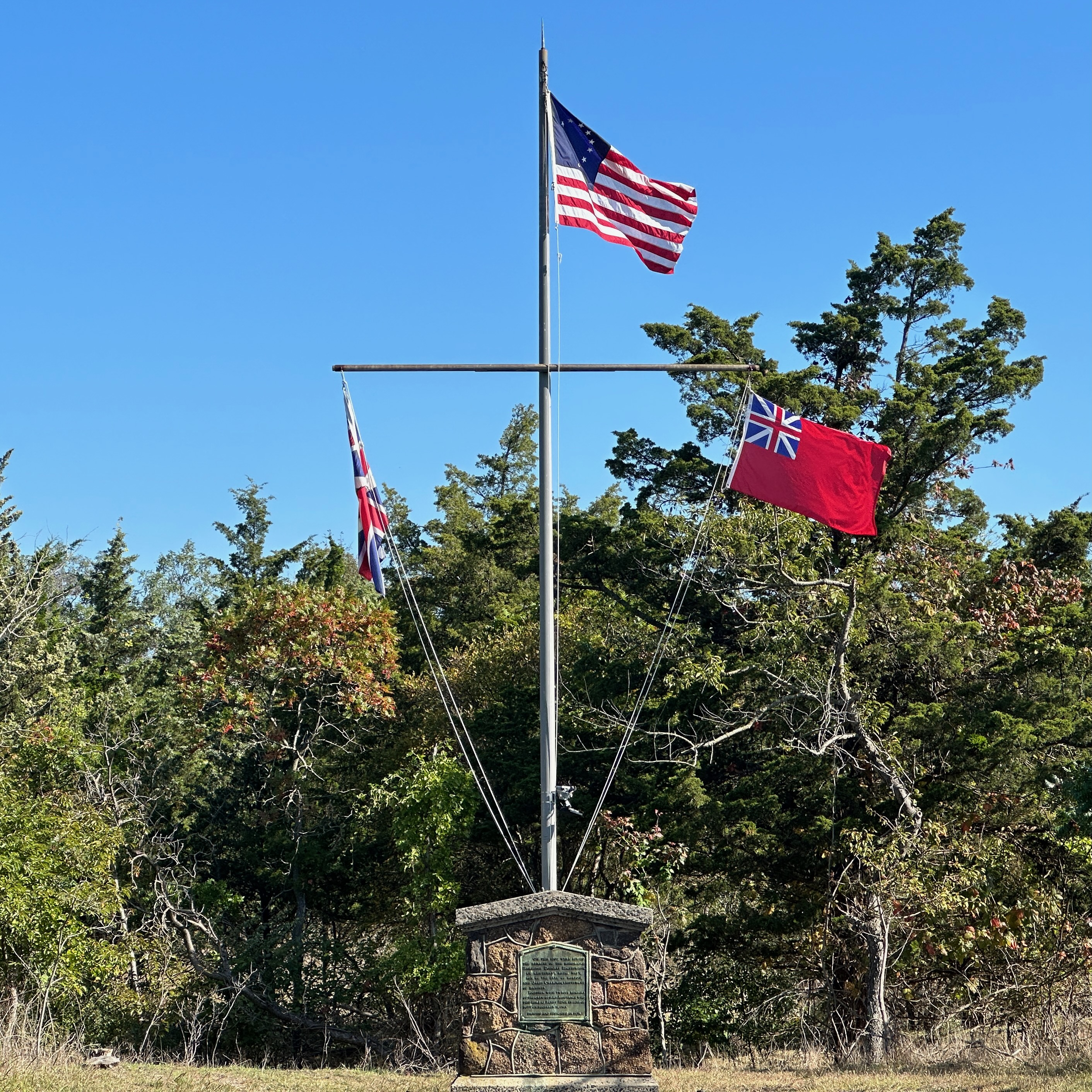
- Halyburton Memorial at Sandy Hook, New Jersey
- Born: October 10, 1763
- Died: December 31, 1783 (aged 20); Sandy Hook, New Jersey
- Burial place: Cypress Hills National Cemetery
- Parent: Sholto Douglas, 15th Earl of Morton

Hamilton Douglas Halyburton (10 October 1763 – 31 December 1783) was a British Lieutenant who died at Sandy Hook, New Jersey.

== Biography ==
He was born on 10 October 1763 to Sholto Douglas, 15th Earl of Morton. He died on 31 December 1783 when he was in command of the barge of HMS Assistance. He was using it to chase deserters off of Sandy Hook. He and his crew were caught in a winter storm and they all died, all but one of the bodies washed ashore the next day. They were described as "12 gentlemen and one common sailor".

== Halyburton Memorial ==
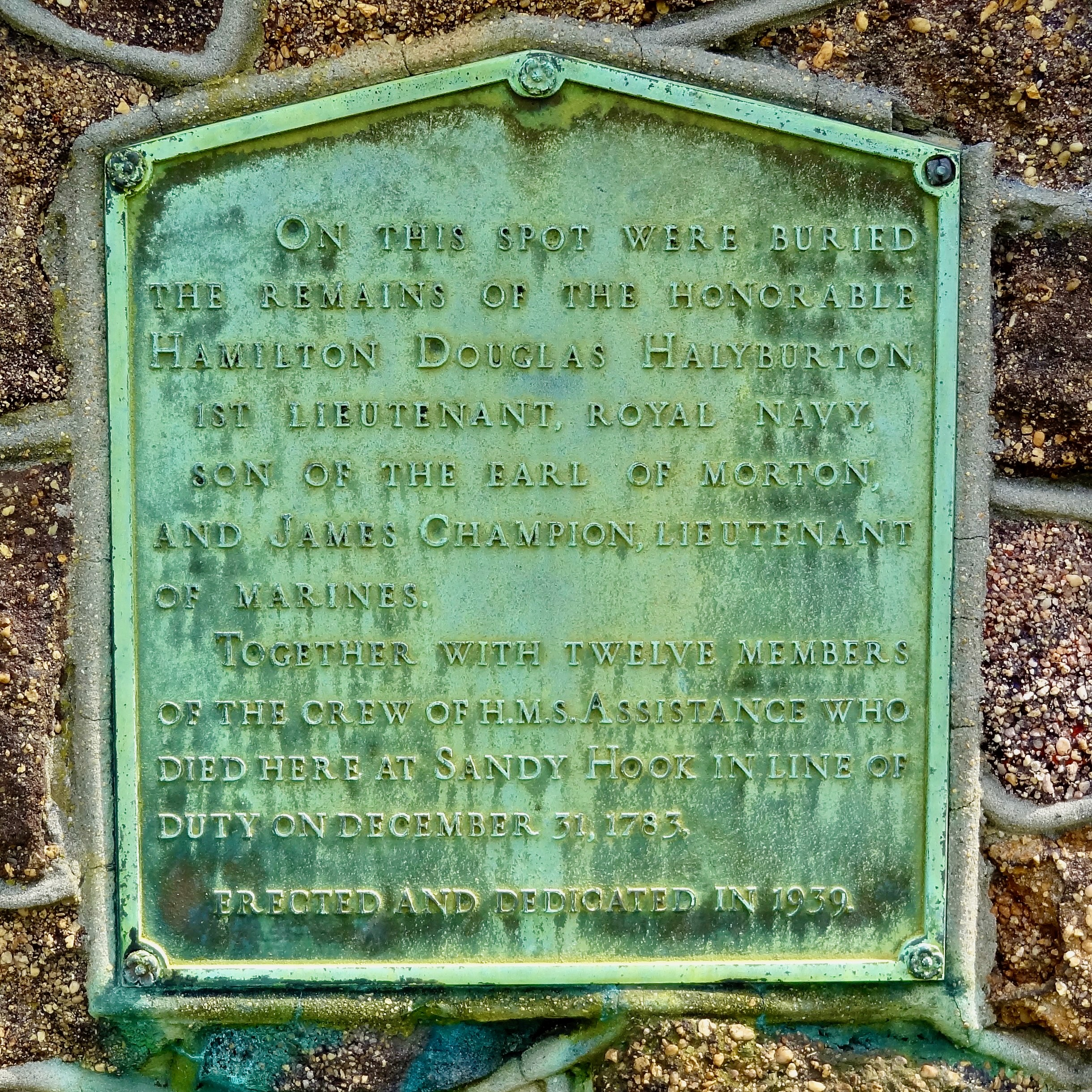
Halyburton Memorial plaque

Katherine Hamilton, the Countess Dowager of Morton erected a monument, but it was destroyed by the French. The grave was rediscovered in 1908 during expansion of a road.

In 1937, a new Halyburton Memorial was constructed. It is a contributing property of the Fort Hancock and the Sandy Hook Proving Ground Historic District, listed on the National Register of Historic Places on April 24, 1980.

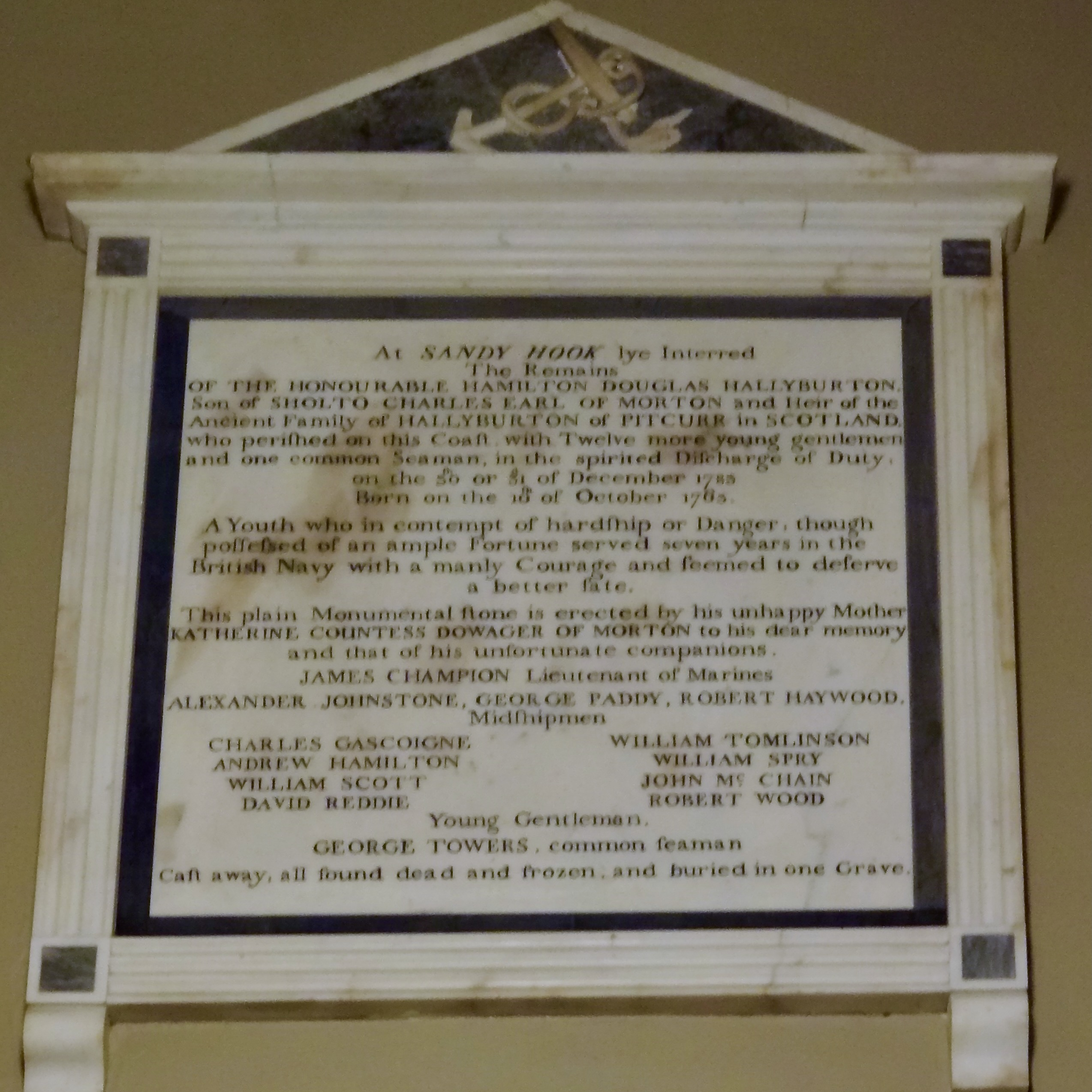
Memorial plaque in Trinity Church in Manhattan

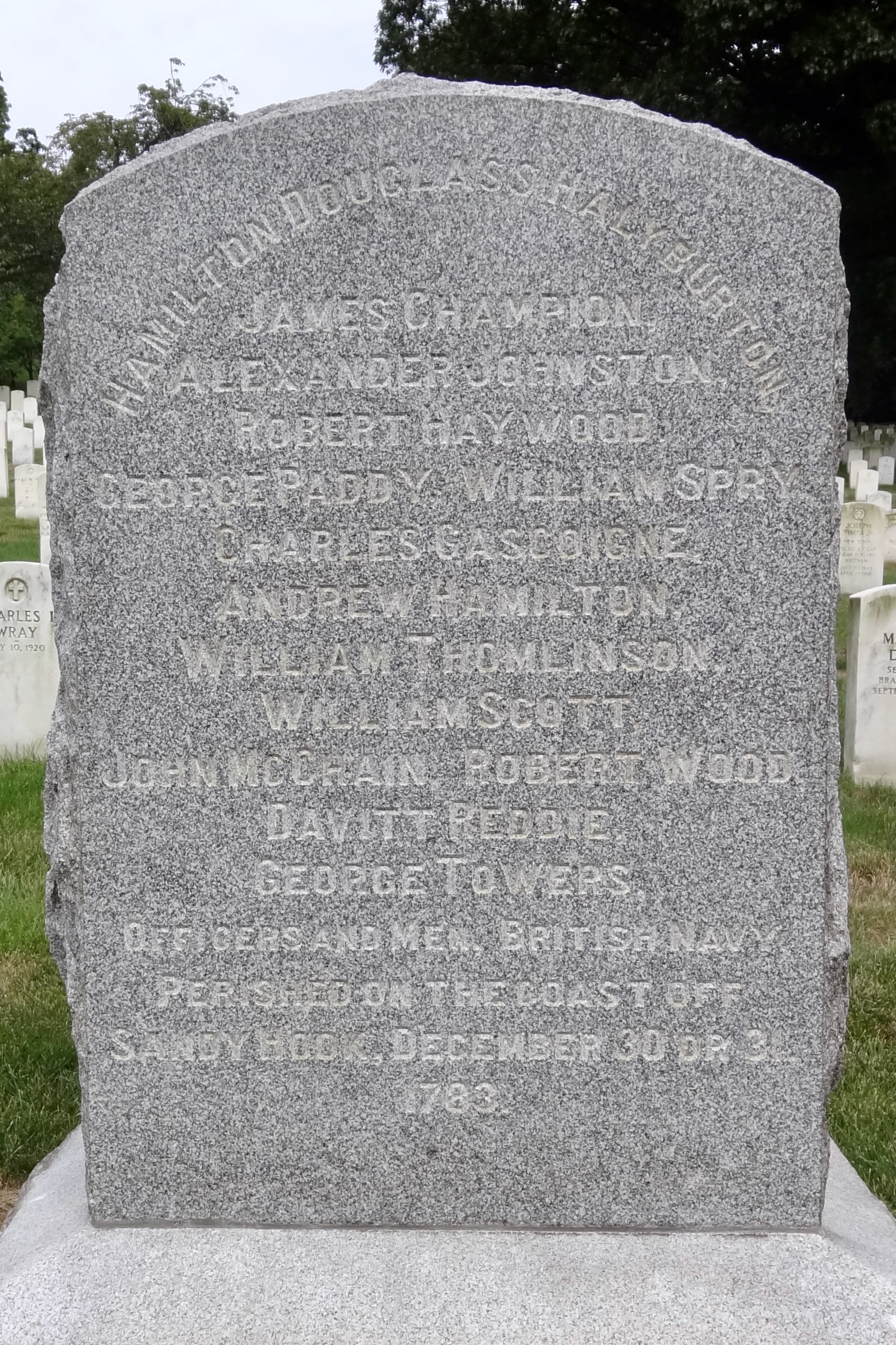
Gravestone at Cypress Hills National Cemetery in Brooklyn
