= Böd of Gremista =

Coordinates: 60°10′13.0008″N 1°9′47.9982″W

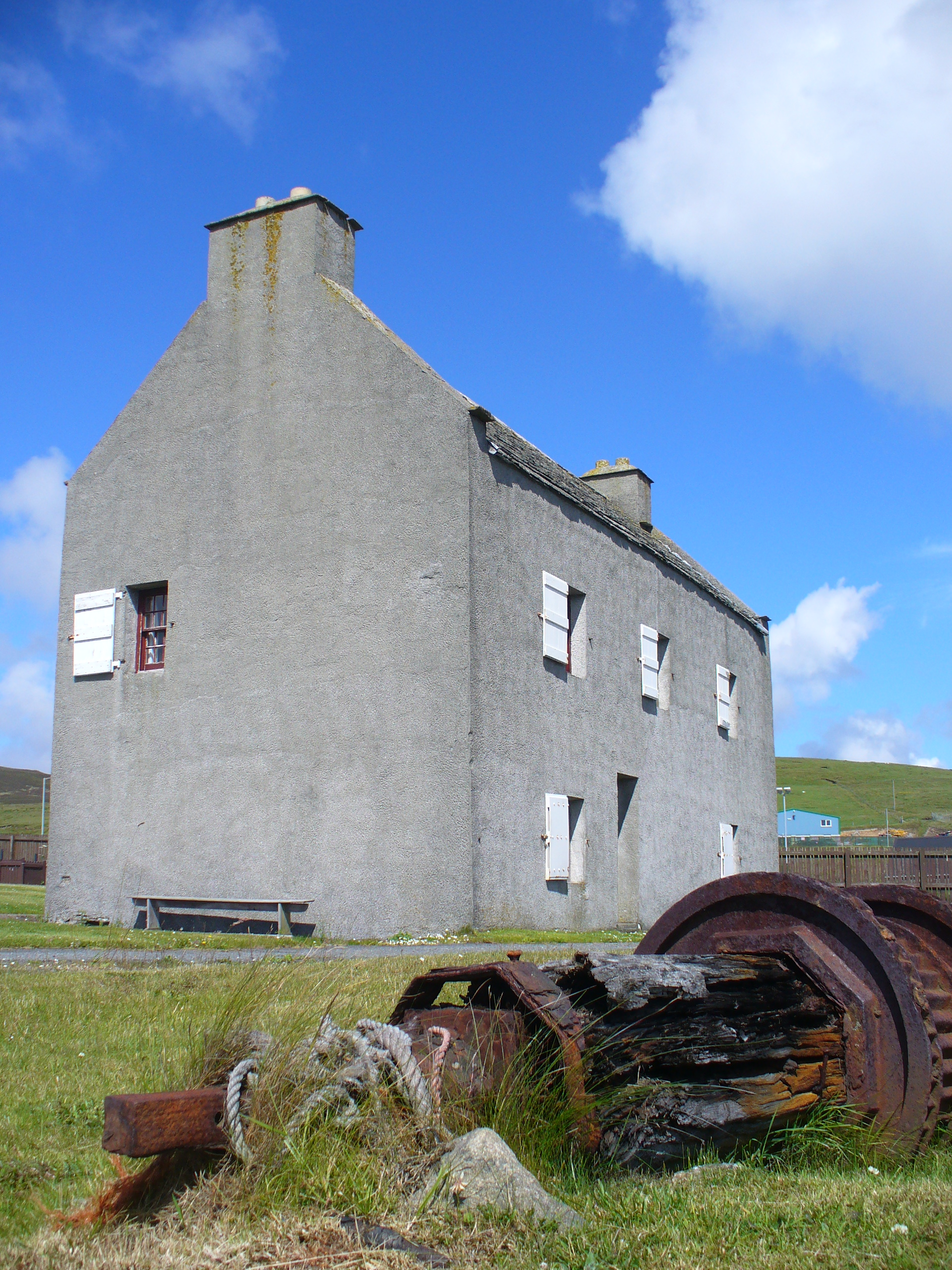
Böd of Gremista

The Böd of Gremista (Shaetlan pronunciation: [ˌbød ə ˈgrimistə]) is a typical 18th-century Shetland fishing booth situated at the north end of Lerwick, Shetland, Scotland. It is protected as a category B listed building.

== History ==
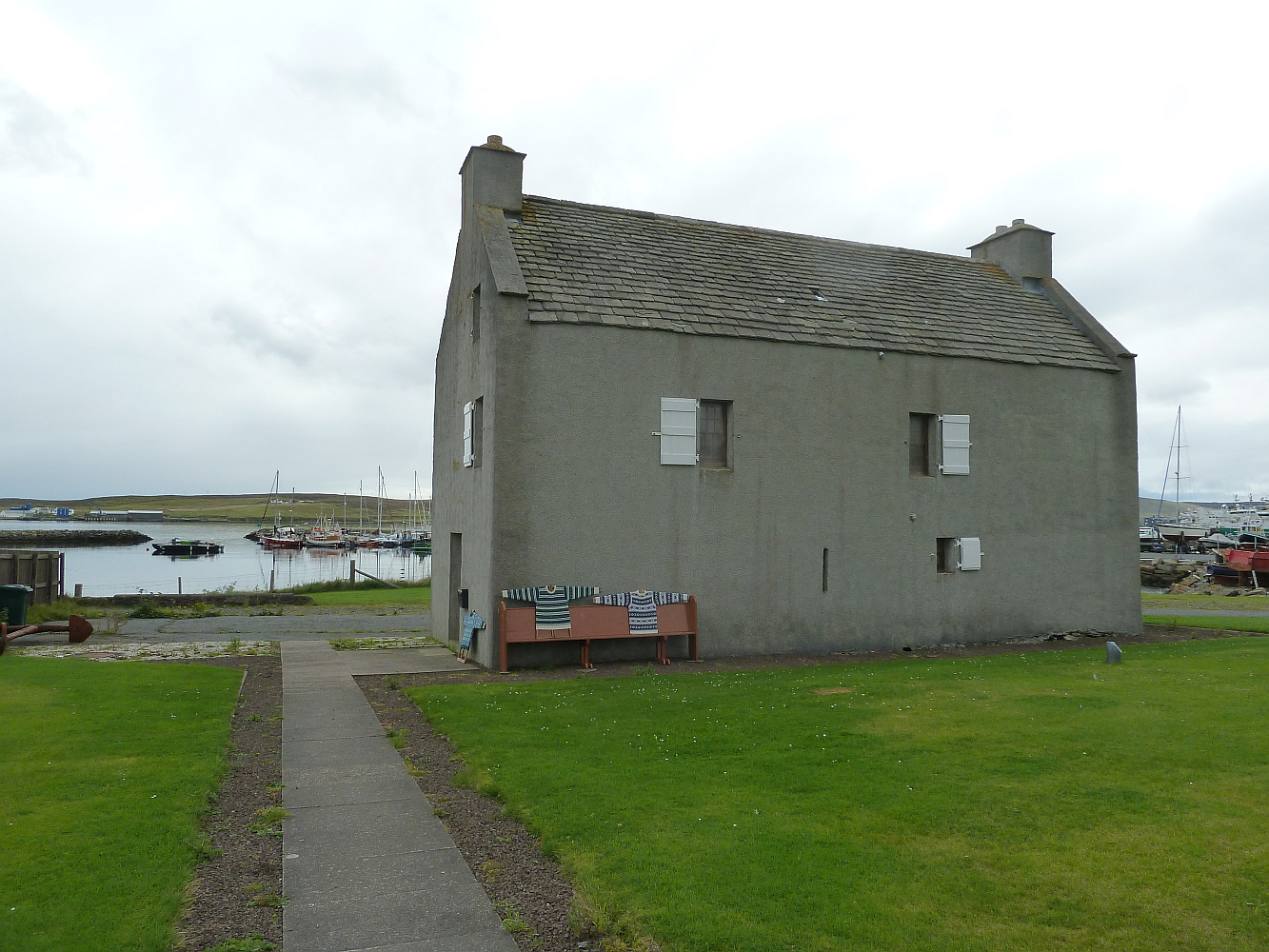
Böd of Gremista

The Böd was built in 1780 by Arthur Nicholson, local landowner and manager of the Gremista fishing station. The building provided family accommodation and a store for the fishing and fish-curing activities that took place on the adjacent beach.

It was the birthplace of Arthur Anderson, co-founder of P&O.

The building fell into disrepair but was restored with grants provided by P&O and the Government of the United Kingdom in 1970, the first phase being completed in 1976. It opened as a museum in 1987, was acquired by the Shetland Museums Service in 1991 and was run as a community museum by the Shetland Amenity Trust. The exhibition included period furnishings and other artefacts together with displays on fishing and the life of Anderson. In 2017 the building was a Shetland textile museum run by a board of trustees and exhibited Shetland textiles from 1800s to the present day including wool, jumpers, Fair Isle, lace, rugs and weaving.

== Description ==
The building is tall and finished with harling. The windows have shutters to the exterior. There are two storeys with an attic; the upper storey is divided into two rooms, as is the attic. The main door is to the east face, placed asymmetrically, and accesses the kitchen. A second door on the north face leads to a room where salt was stored.
