= Charles Dundas (MP, born 1771) =

British politician (1771–1810)

Hon. Charles Lawrence Dundas

Member of Parliament for Malton
- In office 1798–1800 Serving with Bryan Cooke
- Preceded by: William Baldwin; Bryan Cooke
- Succeeded by: Parliament of the United Kingdom

Member of Parliament for Malton
- In office 1801–1805 Serving with Bryan Cooke
- Preceded by: Parliament of Great Britain
- Succeeded by: Bryan Cooke; Henry Grattan

Member of Parliament for Richmond (Yorkshire)
- In office 1806–1810 Serving with Arthur Shakespeare (1806–1808); Lawrence Dundas (1808–1810)
- Preceded by: Arthur Shakespeare; Lawrence Dundas
- Succeeded by: Lawrence Dundas; Robert Chaloner

Personal details
- Born: 18 July 1771 St George Hanover Square, London
- Died: 25 January 1810 (aged 38)
- Party: Whig
- Spouse: Lady Caroline Beauclerk bef. 1800
- Children: 5
- Parents: Thomas Dundas (father); Lady Charlotte Fitzwilliam (mother)
- Relatives: Sir Lawrence Dundas (paternal grandfather); William Fitzwilliam (maternal grandfather); Lawrence Dundas (brother); George Dundas (brother); Robert Dundas (brother); Earl Fitzwilliam (uncle); Frederick Dundas (son)
- Education: Harrow School
- Alma mater: Trinity College, Cambridge

Hon. Charles Lawrence Dundas (18 July 1771 – 25 January 1810) was a British politician and Whig Member of Parliament in the House of Commons. He represented Malton from 1798–1805 and Richmond from 1806 to his death.

== Early life and education ==
Dundas was born in St George Hanover Square, London, the third son of Thomas Dundas and Lady Charlotte Fitzwilliam. His grandfathers were Sir Lawrence Dundas, 1st Baronet and William Fitzwilliam, 3rd Earl Fitzwilliam. His father succeeded to the baronetcy in 1781 and in 1794 was raised to the peerage as Baron Dundas. His eldest brother was Lawrence Dundas, 1st Earl of Zetland (1766–1839), and Rear Admiral Hon. George Heneage Lawrence Dundas (1778–1834) and Sir Robert Lawrence Dundas (1780–1844) were his younger brothers.

Dundas was educated at Harrow School and Trinity College, Cambridge (B.A. 1792; M.A. 1795). He was admitted to Lincoln's Inn in 1789 and called to the bar in 1795.

== Career ==
In 1794, Dundas became private secretary to the Duke of Portland upon the recommendation of his own uncle Earl Fitzwilliam.

Following the resignation of William Baldwin in 1798, Fitzwilliam successfully proposed Dundas to fill his seat for Malton. He adhered closely to his family's political stance on numerous occasions. A Foxite, he voted against the Union of Great Britain and Ireland in 1799 and 1800. In 1805, he resigned his seat to give way for the Irish Whig Henry Grattan, the well-known orator. The following year, he was returned for Richmond in Yorkshire, succeeding his younger brother George, who took up naval command again.

== Personal life ==
Dundas married Lady Caroline Beauclerk, daughter of Aubrey Beauclerk, 5th Duke of St Albans. They had two sons and three daughters:

- Ann Dundas (22 January 1800 – ), died unmarried
- Frederick Dundas (14 June 1802 – 26 October 1872), MP for Orkney and Shetland, who married Grace, daughter of Sir Ralph St George Gore, 7th Baronet
- William Laurence Dundas (1 October 1803 – June 1805), died in childhood
- Catherine Elizabeth (17 January 1805 – 12 February 1876), who married Lt. Gen. Freeman Murray
- Charlotte Amelia (17 April 1808 – 27 January 1881), who married Ralph Thomas Fawcett

He grew ill and died while in office, aged 38.

Parliament of Great Britain
Preceded by William Baldwin; Bryan Cooke	Member of Parliament for Malton; 1798–1800; With: Bryan Cooke	Succeeded by Parliament of the United Kingdom
Parliament of the United Kingdom
Preceded by Parliament of Great Britain	Member of Parliament for Malton; 1801–1805; With: Bryan Cooke	Succeeded by Bryan Cooke; Henry Grattan
Parliament of the United Kingdom
Preceded by Arthur Shakespeare; Lawrence Dundas	Member of Parliament for Richmond (Yorkshire); 1806–1810; With: Arthur Shakespeare 1806–1808; Lawrence Dundas 1808–1810	Succeeded by Lawrence Dundas; Robert Chaloner
