= James West (antiquary) =

British politician and antiquarys

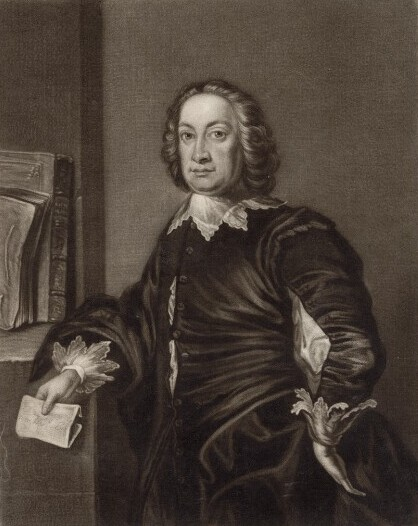
1817 mezzotint of West after a Thomas Gainsborough portrait

James West FRS (2 May 1703 – 2 July 1772) was a British politician and antiquary who served as president of the Royal Society from 1768 to 1772.

== Life and career ==
He was the only son of Richard West of Priors Marston, Warwickshire and St. Swithin's, London and educated at Balliol College, Oxford (1719). He then entered the Inner Temple to study law and was called to the bar in 1728 and made a bencher in 1761.

He was elected a fellow of the Royal Society in 1727, and acted as the society's treasurer from 1736 to 1768. He served as President of the Royal Society from 1768 until his death in 1772.

He was elected as MP for St Albans at the 1741 general election which he represented until 1768. The historian Lewis Namier claims that in two volumes of correspondence relating to West's management of the constituency only three items are about matters of public interest, the rest mostly being requests for jobs and other favours.

In 1746 he had purchased a new house at Lincoln's Inn Fields and employed Thomas Carter the Elder to produce two ornate marble chimney-pieces for the house.

In 1768 he became the member for Boroughbridge, Yorkshire which he served until 1772. West served twice as junior Secretary to the Treasury and twice as senior Secretary to the Treasury.

== Family ==
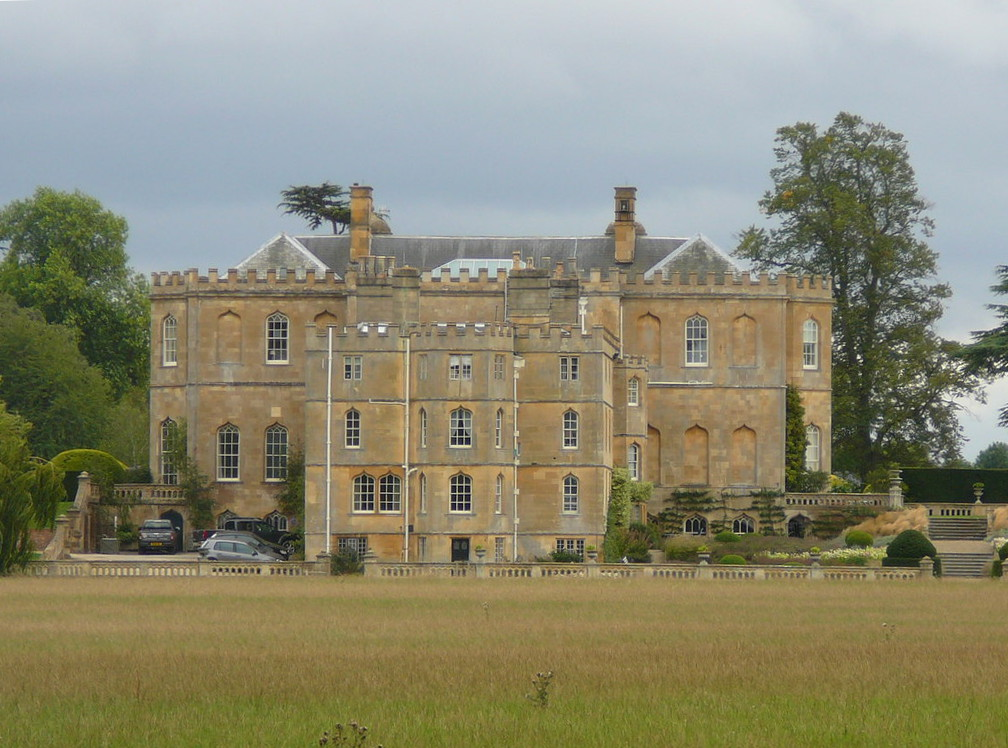
Alscot Park, Preston-on-Stour

He married Sarah, the daughter of Sir Thomas Steavens, a wealthy timber merchant of Eltham, Kent. They lived in the Piazza in Covent Garden and bought Alscot Park, then in Gloucestershire but now in Warwickshire, as a country retreat to which he could retire. He replaced the old house with the present one built in a Rococo Gothic style and moved in c.1762.

James West the younger, the only son of West and Sarah Steavens, died in 1795, predeceasing his mother. Alscot Park thereby passed to James West the younger's son, James Robert West (died 1838).

== See also ==
- List of presidents of the Royal Society

Parliament of Great Britain
Preceded by Sir Thomas Aston, Bt; Thomas Ashby	Member of Parliament for St Albans; 1741–1768; With: Thomas Ashby 1741–1743; Hans Stanley 1743–1747; Sir Peter Thompson 1747–1754; The Viscount Grimston 1754–1761; Viscount Nuneham 1761–1768	Succeeded by Richard Sutton; John Radcliffe
Preceded by Sir Cecil Bishopp, Bt; James West	Member of Parliament for Boroughbridge with Nathaniel Cholmley; 1768–1772	Succeeded by Nathaniel Cholmley; Henry Clinton
Professional and academic associations
Preceded by James Burrow	18th President of the Royal Society; 1768–1772	Succeeded by James Burrow
