= Thomas Balfour =

Scottish politician

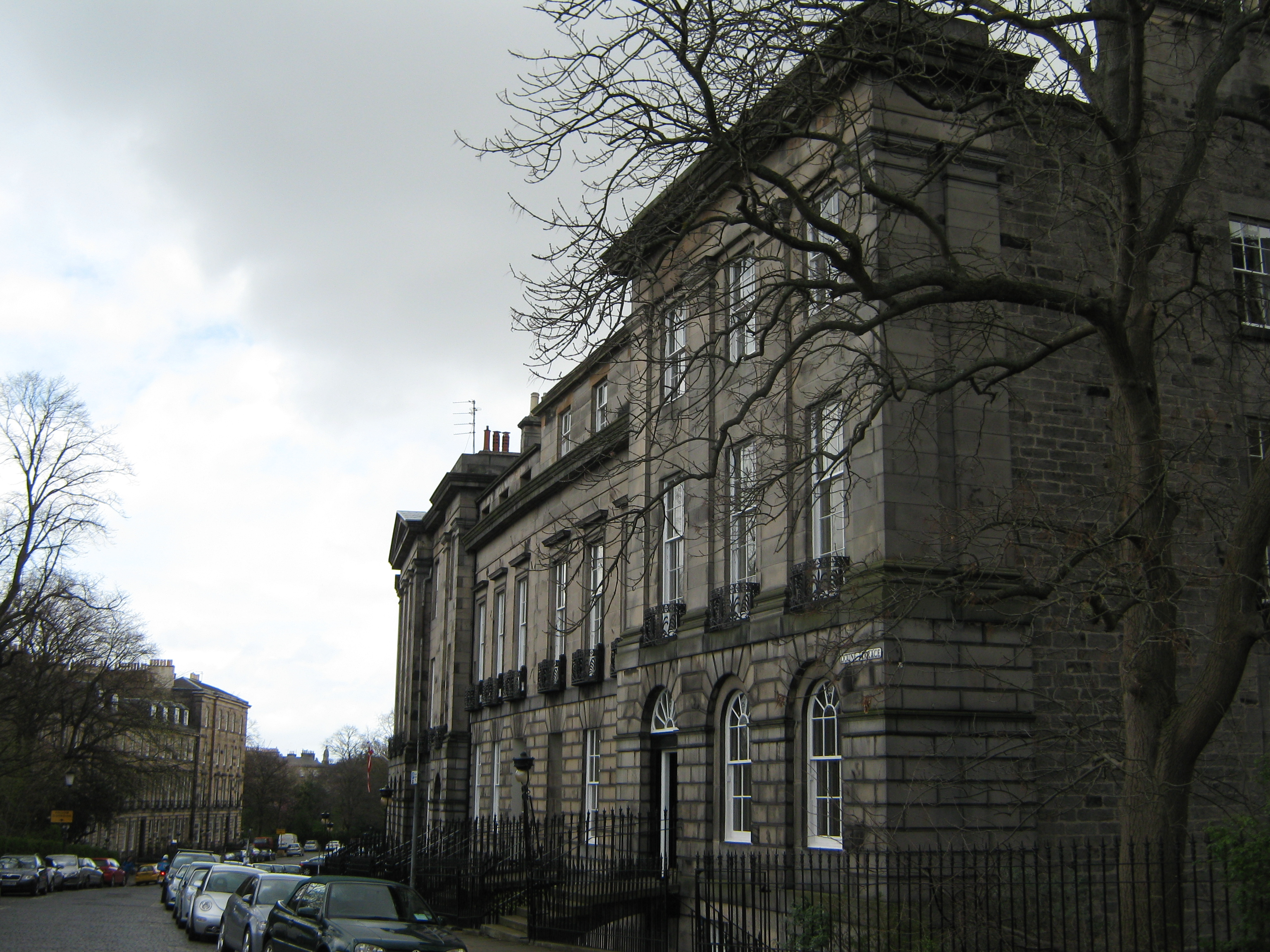
Doune Terrace, Edinburgh

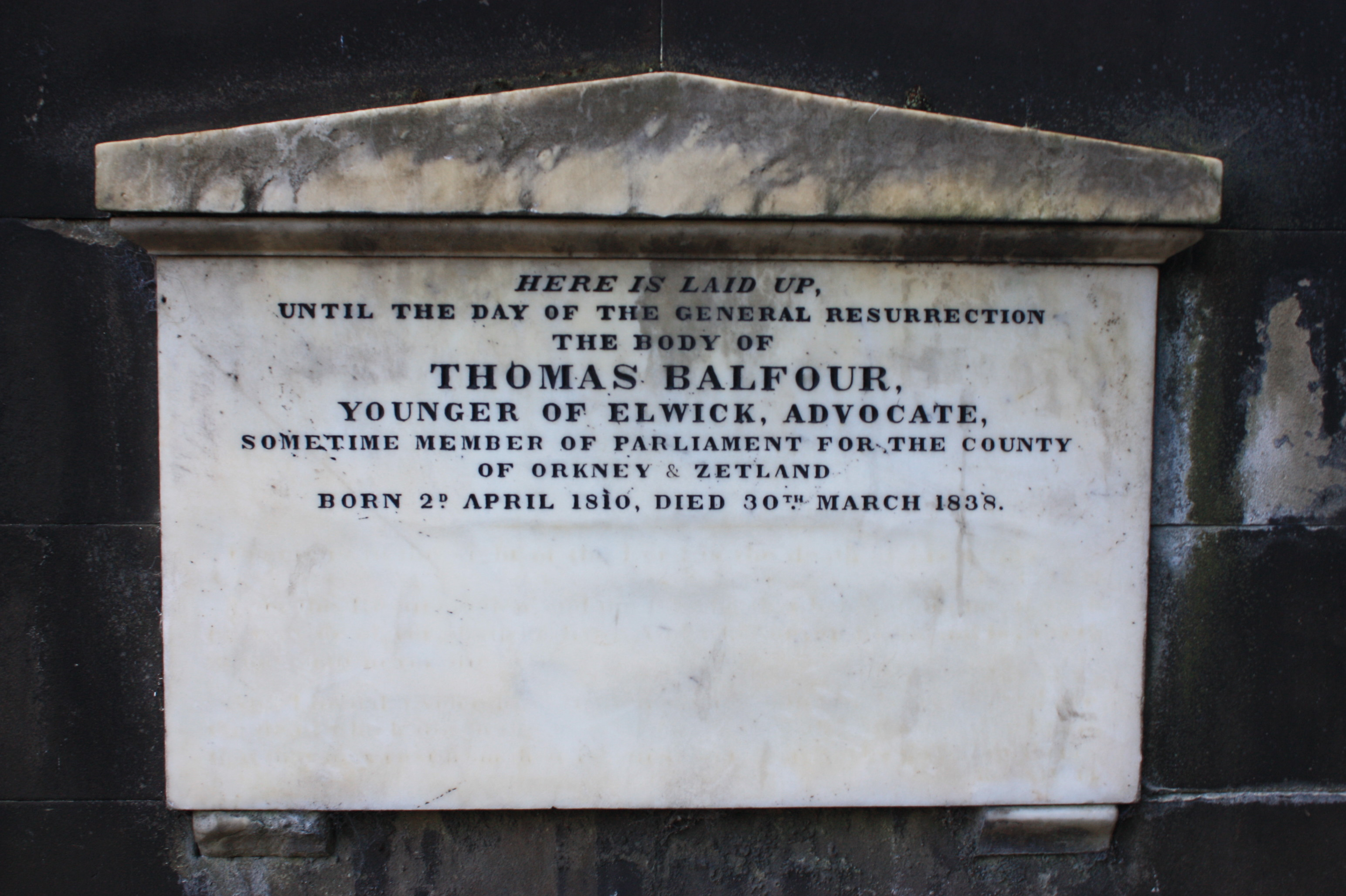
The grave of Thomas Balfour MP, St John's Churchyard, Edinburgh

Thomas Balfour of Elwick FRSE (2 April 1810 – 30 March 1838) was a Scottish politician who sat in the House of Commons from 1835 to 1837. His brother was David Balfour (1811-1887) of Balfour FRSE.

== Family ==
Balfour was the son of Captain William Balfour RN of Trenabie, Orkney. He became an advocate in 1831 and was elected fellow of the Royal Society of Edinburgh on 16 March 1834. His proposer was Thomas Stewart Traill.

Balfour was elected Member of Parliament for Orkney and Shetland on 9 February 1835. He held the seat until 1837. He was a Conservative.

In 1837 he was residing at 9 Doune Terrace on the Moray Estate.

Balfour died unmarried at the age of 28. He is buried in the south-west corner of St Johns Churchyard in Edinburgh.

== Trivia ==
His grandfather Col Thomas Balfour of Elwick was portrayed by Sir Henry Raeburn.

Parliament of the United Kingdom
Preceded by George Traill	Member of Parliament for Orkney and Shetland; 1835 – 1837	Succeeded by Frederick Dundas
