= James Burrow =

English legal reporter and scholar

Sir James Burrow FRS FSA
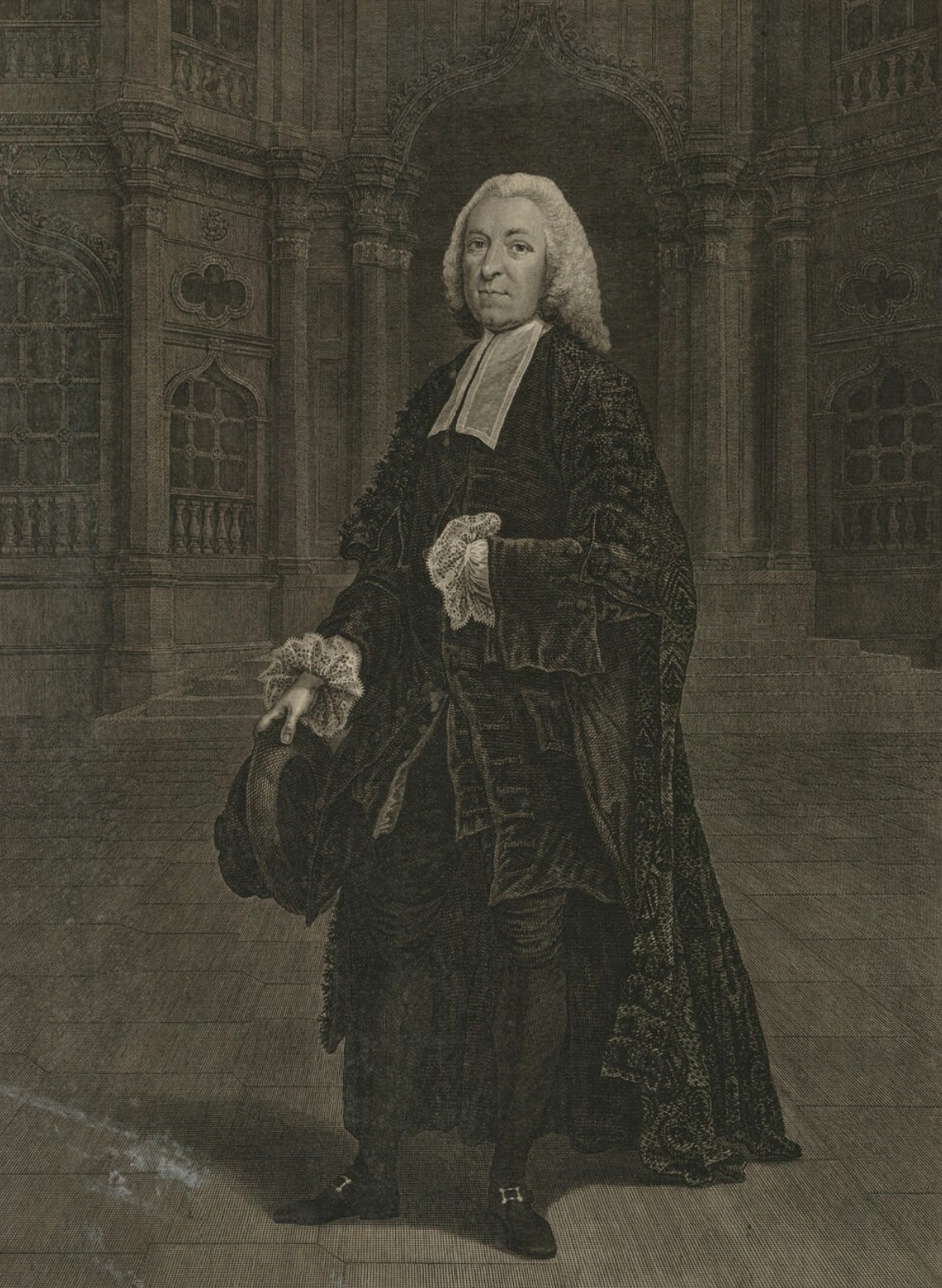
- Engraving by James Basire after an Arthur Devis portrait, 1780

17th and 19th President of the Royal Society
- In office 1768–1768
- Preceded by: James Douglas
- Succeeded by: James West
- In office 1772–1772
- Preceded by: James West
- Succeeded by: Sir John Pringle

Personal details
- Born: November 28, 1701 Starborough Castle, Lingfield, Surrey, England, UK
- Died: 5 November 1782 (aged 80)

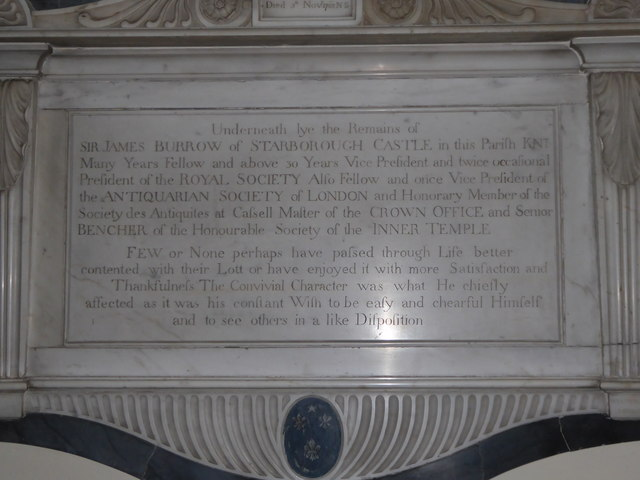
Memorial in Lingfield church

Sir James Burrow FRS FSA (28 November 1701 – 5 November 1782) was an English scholar and legal reporter at Inner Temple, London, and was vice president and twice briefly president of the Royal Society. He was knighted in 1773.

He was elected a Fellow of the Royal Society on 7 April 1737, as "A Gentleman well versed in Natural and Mathematical knowledge". He served as a member of the Royal Society Council from 1752 until 1782, initially as a vice president from 1752, and then as a council member. He twice served briefly as a president of the Royal Society, from October to November 1768 following the death of The Earl of Morton, and July to November 1772, following the death of James West.

As vice president, he was involved in the society's activities in organising the observation of the 1761 Transit of Venus, signing the Articles of Agreement between the Council of the Royal Society and Mr Charles Mason and Mr Jeremiah Dixon for their expedition to Bencoolen in the Island of Sumatra.

As a legal reporter, he wrote and published reports of the decisions of significant cases in the English legal system. At the time, four reporters were formally appointed by the King 'to commit to writing, and truly to deliver, as well the words spoken, as the judgments and reasons thereupon given,' in the courts of Westminster quoted in . His work is still cited in law courses.

== Publications ==
- James Burrow, 1732, The Decisions of King's Bench upon Settlement Cases from the Death of Lord Raymond. London.
- James Burrow. 1757. Serious Reflections on the Present State of Domestic and Foreign Affairs ... together with some critical remarks on lotteries, etc. London.
- James Burrow. 1763. A few Anecdotes and Observations relating to Oliver Cromwell and his family; serving to rectify several errors concerning him, published by N. C. Padopoli in his Historia Gymnasii Patavini. London.
- Sir James Burrow. 1771. De usu et ratione interpungendi: an essay on the use of pointing, and the facility of practising it. J. Worrall & B. Tovey: London.
- Sir James Burrow. 1772. Reports of Cases Argued and Adjudged in the Court of King's Bench: During the Time Lord Mansfield Presided in That Court; from Michaelmas Term, 30 Geo. II. 1756, to Easter Term, 12 Geo. III. London.

== See also ==
- List of presidents of the Royal Society

Professional and academic associations
Preceded by James Douglas	17th President of the Royal Society; 1768	Succeeded by James West
Preceded by James West	19th President of the Royal Society; 1772	Succeeded by John Pringle
