= Peter Thompson (antiquarian) =

English merchant, collector and MP

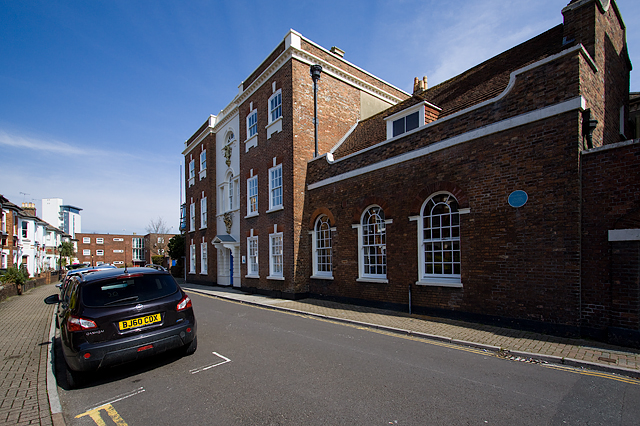
Sir Peter Thompson House, Poole

Sir Peter Thompson (30 October 1698 – 31 October 1770) was an English merchant, collector and MP.

He was a younger son of Captain Thomas Thompson of Poole, Dorset.

He became an eminent merchant in Bermondsey, London, trading in Hamburg and Newfoundland. He was made High Sheriff of Surrey for 1745-46 and knighted the same year. In 1746, he travelled to Berlin during the War of the Austrian Succession. He sat in Parliament as MP for St Albans from 1747 to 1754.

He built a large town house in Poole, now a grade I listed building, and became a collector and antiquary, being created a Fellow of the Society of Antiquaries and, in 1746, a Fellow of the Royal Society.

Thompson was a friend of Joseph Ames (author), and died unmarried and was succeeded by his brother James.

Parliament of Great Britain
| Preceded by James West; Hans Stanley | Member of Parliament for St Albans; 1747–1754; With: James West | Succeeded by James West; Hon. James Grimston |
