= James Moodie =

British politician (died 1724)

James Moodie (died 4 February 1724) of Orkney was a British politician.

Moodie was the second son of Royal Navy Captain James Moodie of Melsetter, Orkney. His mother was the daughter of James Douglas, 11th Earl of Morton.

Moodie was elected unopposed as the Member of Parliament (MP) for Orkney and Shetland in 1715, but was defeated at the 1722 election by his cousin George Douglas, later 13th Earl of Morton.

Parliament of Great Britain
Preceded by George Douglas	Member of Parliament for Orkney and Shetland; 1715–1722	Succeeded by George Douglas
