= HMS Assistance (1781) =

Ship of the line of the Royal Navy

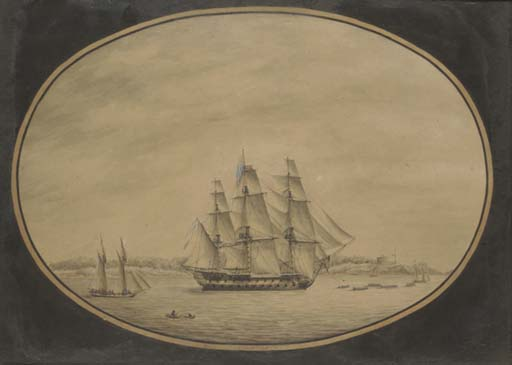
- H.M.S. Assistance in Halifax Harbour, Nova Scotia, 1796, sketched by Captain George Gustavus Lennock, R.N.

History

Great Britain
- Name: HMS Assistance
- Ordered: 11 February 1778
- Builder: Peter Baker, Liverpool
- Laid down: 4 July 1778
- Launched: 12 March 1781
- Completed: By 31 December 1781
- Fate: Wrecked on 29 March 1802

General characteristics
- Class & type: 50-gun Portland-class fourth rate
- Tons burthen: 1,053 37/94 bm
- Length: 145 ft 1 in (44.2 m) (overall); 119 ft 9 in (36.5 m) (keel)
- Beam: 40 ft 8 in (12.4 m)
- Depth of hold: 17 ft 6 in (5.33 m)
- Propulsion: Sails
- Sail plan: Full-rigged ship
- Complement: 350
- Armament: Upper deck: 22 × 12-pounders; Lower deck: 22 × 24-pounders; Quarter deck: 4 × 6-pounders; Forecastle: 2 × 6-pounders

HMS Assistance was a 50-gun Portland-class fourth rate of the Royal Navy. She was launched during the American War of Independence and spent most of her career serving in American waters, particularly off Halifax and Newfoundland. Assistance was the flagship of several of the commanders of the station. She was in service at the beginning of the French Revolutionary Wars, and was wrecked off Dunkirk in 1801.

== Construction and commissioning ==
Assistance was ordered from the Liverpool yard of Peter Baker on 11 February 1778, laid down there on 4 July that year, and launched on 12 March 1781. She was completed by 31 December 1781, having cost £10,908.3.3d. to build, and entered service in the English Channel under her first commander, Captain James Worth.

== Career ==
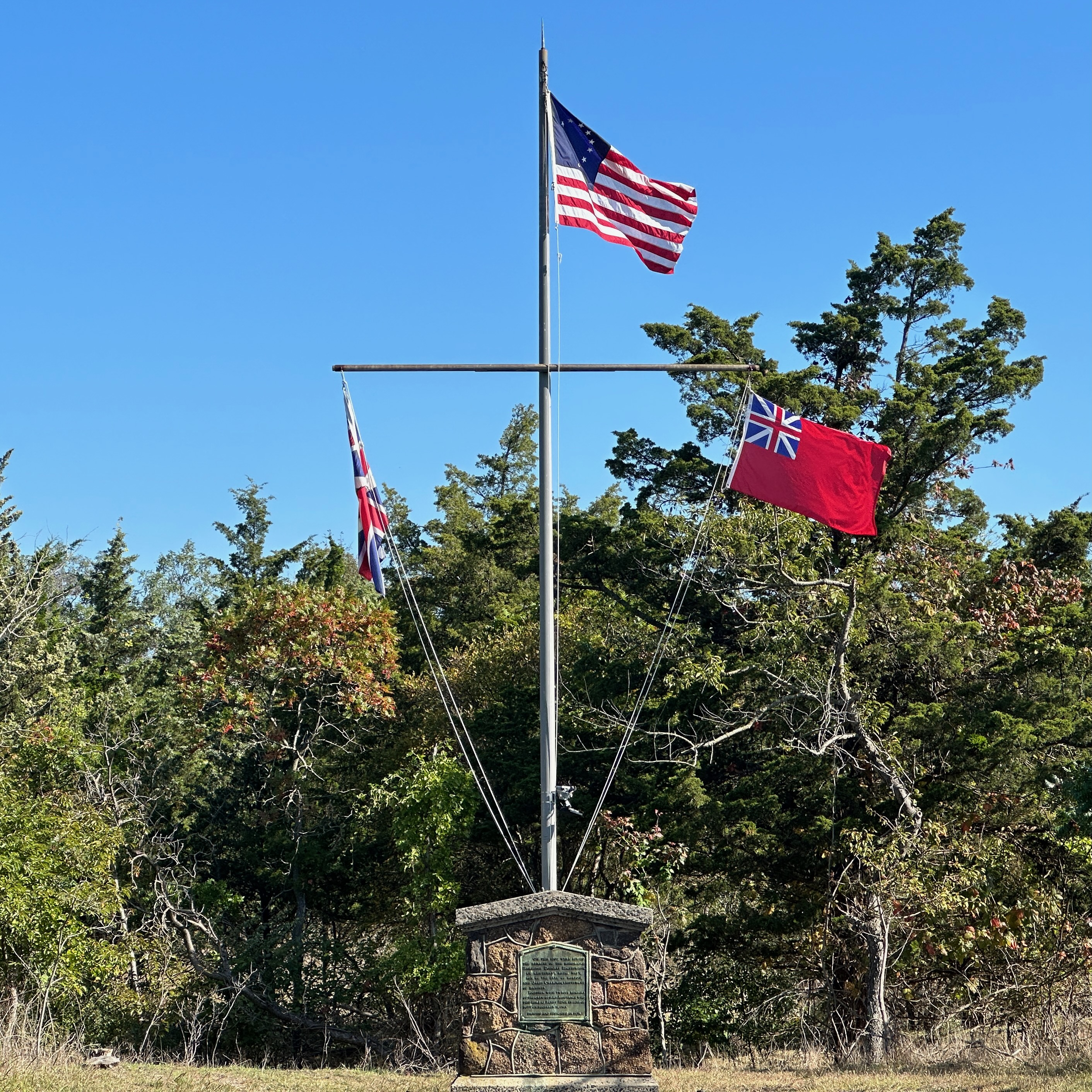
Halyburton Memorial at Sandy Hook in New Jersey

She escorted a convoy to North America in May 1782, returning to Britain to be paid off in early 1783. Assistance was then refitted at Plymouth and returned to North America in October 1783 under the command of Captain William Bentinck and flying the broad pendant of Captain Sir Charles Douglas. Serving on Assistance at this time was Lieutenant Hamilton Douglas Halyburton, the son of Sholto Douglas, 15th Earl of Morton. He and a party of men were sent out in Assistance's barge to chase deserters, but, landing in the dark and in a snowstorm, they became trapped in mud. When the snowstorm cleared two days later, all 13 of the party had died from exposure. "Had they landed fifty yards on either side from the place they became stranded, the company would have escaped." A memorial was later erected by Lt Halyburton's mother, Katherine, Countess of Morton. Captain Nicholas Sawyer took command in January 1784, flying the broad pendant of Captain Herbert Sawyer.

Assistance returned to Britain in mid-1786 and was paid off. She underwent repairs at Chatham and was recommissioned in 1790 during the Spanish Armament under Captain Lord James Cranstoun. The easing of tensions led to Assistance being paid off in 1791, before recommissioning the following year under Captain John Samuel Smith in order to serve off North America again. She became the flagship of Rear-Admiral Sir Richard King on the Halifax station between August 1792 and January 1793. Captain Arthur Legge took command in February, being replaced by Captain Nathan Brunton in July for service cruising with the Channel Fleet. Captain Henry Mowatt was in command from May 1795, returning the Assistance to Halifax in March 1796, where he captured the 40-gun French frigate Elizabeth on 28 August 1796. Mowatt died in April 1798, and was succeeded in the command of Assistance by Captain John Oakes Hardy, and he from December 1799 by Captain Robert Hall. Hall took her home from Halifax to be repaired at Chatham between October 1800 and January 1801, whereupon she recommissioned under Captain Richard Lee for a return to Halifax.

== Fate ==
On 29 March 1802, Assistance was en route from Dunkirk to Portsmouth when she ran aground on a sandbank near Gravelines. Efforts to free her were unsuccessful, and the impact of waves against her beached hull quickly rendered the vessel unserviceable. The beaching was visible from the Flemish shore, and a local pilot boat and several fishing boats put to sea to come to her aid. By late afternoon Captain Lee accepted that Assistance was stuck fast and unable to sail; he and the crew then abandoned ship. Two marines drowned while attempting to swim to one of the fishing boats, but the remainder of the crew were safely carried to shore in the Flemish craft. The surviving crew members then made their way to Dunkirk, where a ship was hired to return them to England.

A court martial was convened ten days later, to be held aboard HMS Brilliant. Blame for Assistance's loss was laid at the feet of her pilots, Watson Riches and Edmund Coleman, who were found to have acted negligently in not guiding the ship clear of the charted sandbanks off the Gravelines shore. The two men were fined, and jailed for six months in Marshalsea Prison. For his part, Captain Lee was admonished for placing the too much trust in the pilots, and for not showing due regard for the safety of his ship. No formal penalty was imposed, though Lee was denied a new naval command for the following three years. He returned to active service in 1805, as captain of the 74-gun HMS Courageux.
