= Malcolm Smith (British politician) =

Scottish Liberal Party politician

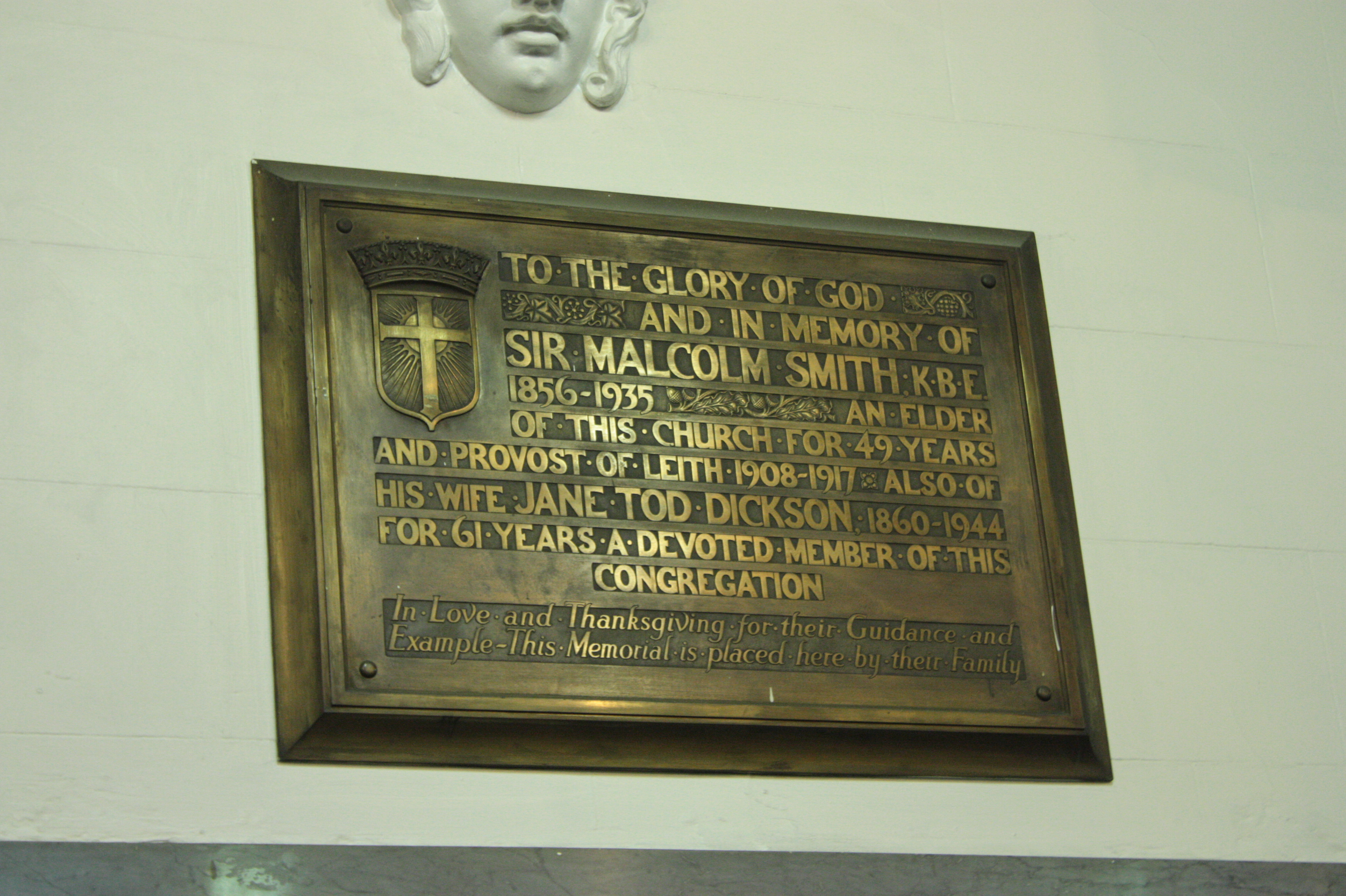
Plaque to Sir Malcolm Smith, South Leith Parish Church

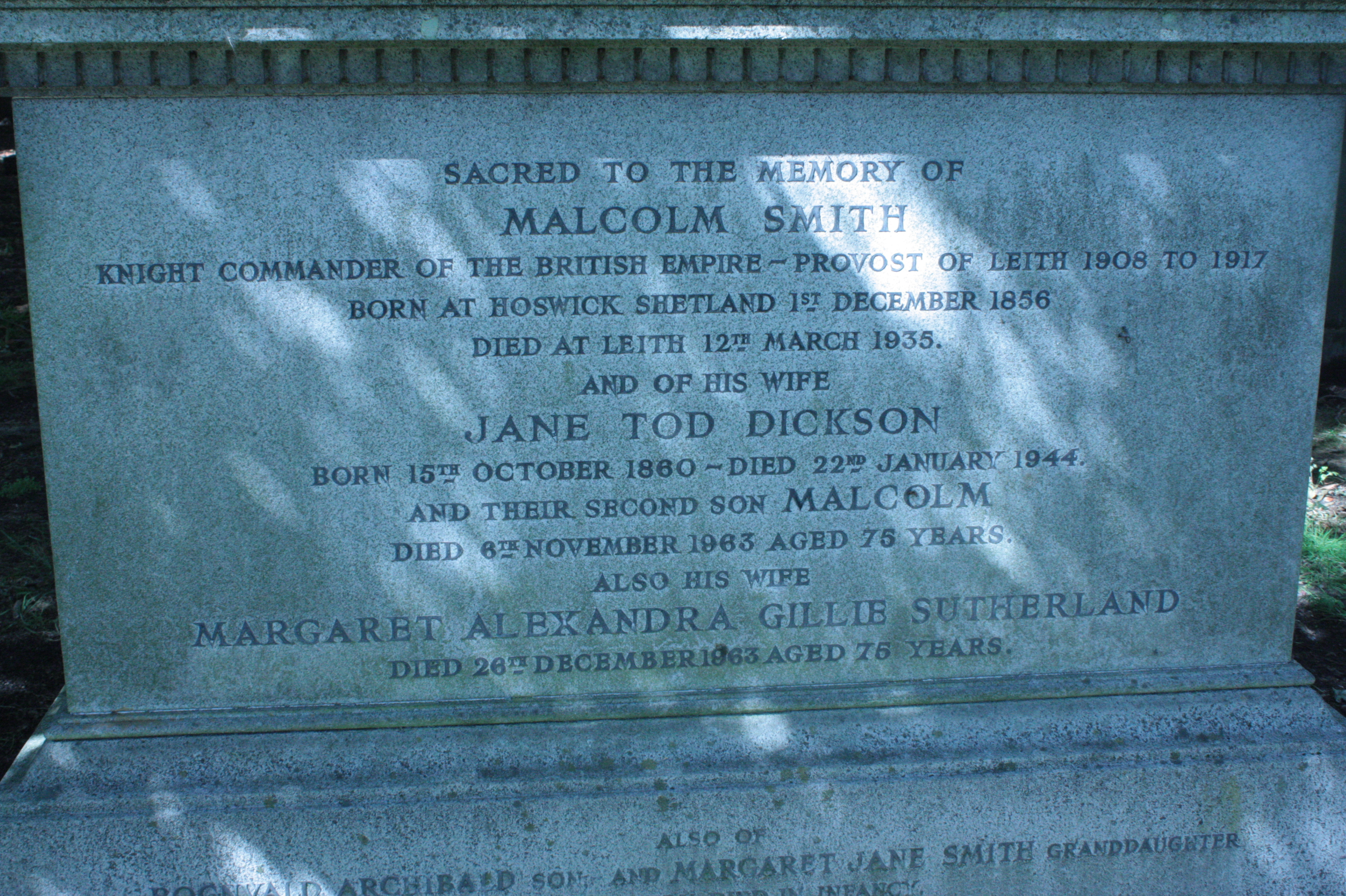
grave of Malcolm Smith MP, Warriston Cemetery

Sir Malcolm Smith (1 December 1856 – 12 March 1935) was a Scottish Liberal Party politician.

== Life ==
Smith was born and brought up in a crofting family in Hoswick, Shetland, but moved to the port of Leith as a young man. There he prospered as a businessman and became the Provost of Leith from 1908 to 1917, shortly before the town was incorporated into the city of Edinburgh. During this period he lived at 47 Stirling Road in the Trinity district. His duties during this period included presiding over the ceremony unveiling the Gretna Memorial in Rosebank Cemetery on 13 May 1916.

He was elected unopposed as the Member of Parliament (MP) for the island constituency of Orkney and Shetland in a by-election in May 1921, following the death of the sitting MP, Cathcart Wason. Having stood in the by-election as a Coalition Liberal, supporting the coalition government led by David Lloyd George, he stood at the 1922 general election as a National Liberal, but was defeated by the Liberal party candidate Robert William Hamilton.

He died in Leith and was buried in Warriston Cemetery to the south-east of the vaults.

A memorial to Smith and his wife also exists in the south aisle of South Leith Parish Church.

== Family ==
He was married to Jane Tod Dickson (1860–1944).

Parliament of the United Kingdom
Preceded by Cathcart Wason	Member of Parliament for Orkney and Shetland; 1921 – 1922	Succeeded by Sir Robert William Hamilton
