= List of presidents of the Royal Society =

President of the Royal Society
- The arms of the Royal Society

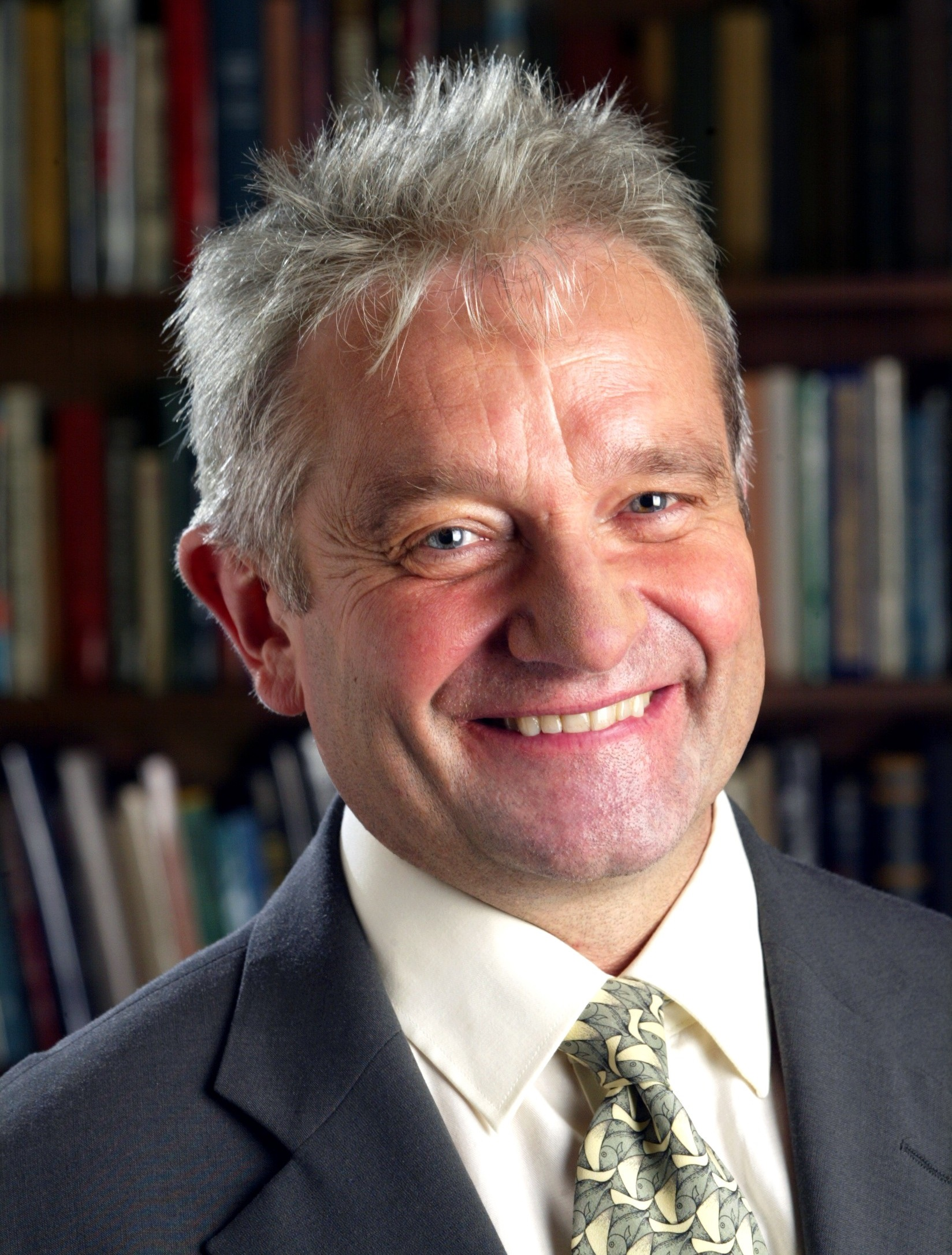
- Incumbent; Paul Nurse since 1 December 2025
- Royal Society
- Style: President, Sir/Madam, or Mr/Madam President
- Type: Head of the Society
- Abbreviation: PRS
- Member of: The Royal Society Council
- Seat: Carlton House Terrace, London
- Nominator: Royal Society Council
- Appointer: Royal Society Fellows
- Term length: 5 years
- Constituting instrument: Royal Charters of the Royal Society
- Inaugural holder: Viscount Brouncker
- Formation: 1662
- First holder: Viscount Brouncker
- Salary: Honorary role and not applicable
- Website: royalsociety.org

The president of the Royal Society (PRS), also known as the Royal Society of London, is the elected head of the Royal Society who presides over meetings of the society's council.

After an informal meeting (a lecture) by Christopher Wren at Gresham College, the Royal Society was officially founded on 28 November 1660 when a group of academics decided to found "a College for the Promoting of Mathematical Experimental Learning". King Charles II granted the society a Royal Charter on 15 July 1662, formally establishing it as the "Royal Society of London." The Royal Charter nominated William Brouncker as president and stipulated that future presidents should be elected by the Council and Fellows of the Society at anniversary meetings each year on St. Andrew's Day (30 November).

The details of the presidency were described by the second Royal Charter in 1663, which did not set any limit on how long a president could serve. There were considerable fluctuations in the president's term of office until well into the 19th century. By then, sentiment had turned against electing wealthy amateurs solely because they might become patrons of the society, and in 1847 the society decided that Fellows would be elected solely on scientific merit. Since the 1870s, it has been usual (with a few exceptions) for each President to serve for exactly five years. Under the current statutes, a president cannot serve for more than five years. The current President is Sir Paul Nurse who began his second 5-year tenure on 1 December 2025.

Historically, the duties of the president have been both formal and social. Under the Cruelty to Animals Act 1876, the President was one of only a few people authorized to certify that a particular experiment on an animal was justified, and in addition he acted as the government's chief (albeit informal) advisor for scientific matters. At the same time, the President was tasked with entertaining distinguished foreign guests and scientists.

The changeover of presidents occurs on the Royal Society Anniversary Day, the weekday on or nearest to 30 November, after the departing President's Anniversary Address. Of the 26 presidents since 1901, 18 have been Nobel laureates (seven in Physiology or Medicine, four in Physics and seven in Chemistry). Many past presidents, including all those in the 20th century, have been appointed to the Order of Merit.

Sir Joseph Banks was the longest serving president of Royal Society, serving from 1778 to 1820.

== Presidents of the Royal Society ==
List of presidents of the Royal Society from 1662 – till date.
No.	Term	Portrait	President	Profession
1	1662–1677		William Brouncker, 2nd Viscount Brouncker	Mathematician
2	1677–1680		Sir Joseph Williamson	Civil servant and politician
3	1680–1682		Sir Christopher Wren	Architect, astronomer and physicist
4	1682–1683		Sir John Hoskyns, 2nd Baronet	Lawyer
5	1683–1684		Cyril Wyche	Lawyer, politician and administrator
6	1684–1686		Samuel Pepys	Civil servant and politician
7	1686–1689		John Vaughan, 3rd Earl of Carbery	Politician
8	1689–1690		Thomas Herbert, 8th Earl of Pembroke	Politician
9	1690–1695		Sir Robert Southwell	Diplomat
10	1695–1698		Charles Montagu, 1st Earl of Halifax	Poet and statesman
11	1698–1703		John Somers, 1st Baron Somers	Jurist and statesman
12	1703–1727		Sir Isaac Newton	Physicist, mathematician, astronomer, natural philosopher, alchemist, and theologian
13	1727–1741		Sir Hans Sloane, 1st Baronet	Physician and collector
14	1741–1752		Martin Folkes	Antiquarian
15	1752–1764		George Parker, 2nd Earl of Macclesfield	Astronomer
16	1764–1768		James Douglas, 14th Earl of Morton	Astronomer
17	1768–1768		Sir James Burrow	Legal reporter
18	1768–1772		James West	Politician and antiquarian
19	1772–1772		Sir James Burrow	Legal reporter
20	1772–1778		Sir John Pringle, 1st Baronet	Physician
21	1778–1820		Sir Joseph Banks	Naturalist and botanist
22	1820–1820		William Hyde Wollaston	Chemist
23	1820–1827		Sir Humphry Davy, 1st Baronet	Chemist and inventor
24	1827–1830		Davies Gilbert	Engineer, author and politician
25	1830–1838		Prince Augustus Frederick, Duke of Sussex	Sixth son of George III of the United Kingdom
26	1838–1848		Spencer Compton, 2nd Marquess of Northampton	Nobleman
27	1848–1854		William Parsons, 3rd Earl of Rosse	Astronomer
28	1854–1858		John Wrottesley, 2nd Baron Wrottesley	Astronomer
29	1858–1861		Sir Benjamin Collins Brodie, 1st Baronet	Physiologist and surgeon
30	1861–1871		Sir Edward Sabine	Astronomer, geophysicist, ornithologist and explorer
31	1871–1873		Sir George Biddell Airy	Mathematician and astronomer
32	1873–1878		Sir Joseph Dalton Hooker	Botanist and explorer
33	1878–1883		William H. Spottiswoode	Mathematician and physicist
34	1883–1885		Thomas Henry Huxley	Biologist
35	1885–1890		Sir George Stokes, 1st Baronet	Mathematician and physicist
36	1890–1895		William Thomson, 1st Baron Kelvin	Mathematical physicist
37	1895–1900		Joseph Lister, 1st Baron Lister	Surgeon
38	1900–1905		Sir William Huggins	Astronomer
39	1905–1908		John William Strutt, 3rd Baron Rayleigh	Physicist
40	1908–1913		Sir Archibald Geikie	Geologist and writer
41	1913–1915		Sir William Crookes	Chemist and physicist
42	1915–1920		Sir Joseph John Thomson	Physicist
43	1920–1925		Sir Charles Scott Sherrington	Neurophysiologist, histologist, bacteriologist, and pathologist
44	1925–1930		Sir Ernest Rutherford (later 1st Baron Rutherford of Nelson)	Physicist and chemist
45	1930–1935		Sir Frederick Gowland Hopkins	Biochemist
46	1935–1940		Sir William Henry Bragg	Physicist, chemist and mathematician
47	1940–1945		Sir Henry Hallett Dale	Pharmacologist and physiologist
48	1945–1950		Sir Robert Robinson	Organic chemist
49	1950–1955		Edgar Adrian, 1st Baron Adrian	Electrophysiologist
50	1955–1960		Sir Cyril Norman Hinshelwood	Physical chemist
51	1960–1965		Howard Florey, Baron Florey	Pharmacologist and pathologist
52	1965–1970		Patrick Blackett (Baron Blackett after 1969)	Physicist
53	1970–1975		Sir Alan Lloyd Hodgkin	Physiologist and Biophysicist
54	1975–1980		Alexander R. Todd, Baron Todd	Biochemist
55	1980–1985		Sir Andrew Huxley	Physiologist and biophysicist
56	1985–1990		Sir George Porter (Baron Porter of Luddenham after 1990)	Chemist
57	1990–1995		Sir Michael Atiyah	Mathematician
58	1995–2000		Sir Aaron Klug	Chemist and biophysicist
59	2000–2005		Sir Robert May (Baron May of Oxford after 2001)	Mathematical Biologist
60	2005–2010		Martin Rees, Baron Rees of Ludlow	Cosmologist and astrophysicist
61	2010–2015		Sir Paul Nurse	Geneticist and cell biologist
62	2015–2020		Venki Ramakrishnan	Biophysicist
63	2020–2025		Sir Adrian Smith	Statistician
64	2025–present		Paul Nurse	Geneticist and cell biologist
