= Basil Neven-Spence =

Scottish politician

Sir Basil Neven-Spence
- Neven-Spence in November 1969

Member of Parliament for Orkney and Shetland
- In office 14 November 1935 – 23 February 1950
- Preceded by: Sir Robert Hamilton
- Succeeded by: Jo Grimond

Personal details
- Born: 12 May 1888 Leith, Scotland, United Kingdom
- Died: 13 September 1974 (aged 86) Edinburgh, Scotland, United Kingdom
- Resting place: Uyea Chapel Cemetery, Uyea, Unst
- Party: Unionist
- Spouse: Margaret Alice MacKenzie (m. 1917; died 1961) Lady Constance Ella Corbet (m. 1963; died 1967)
- Children: 3
- Parent: Thomas William Leisk Spence (father) Henrietta Fanny Hebden (mother)
- Education: University of Edinburgh

Military service
- Allegiance: United Kingdom
- Branch/service: British Army
- Years of service: 1911–1927
- Rank: Major
- Unit: Royal Army Medical Corps
- Battles/wars: World War I
- Awards: Order of the Nile; Military Cross; Victory Medal; British War Medal

Sir Basil Hamilton Hebden Neven-Spence (12 June 1888 – 13 September 1974) was a Scottish Unionist Party politician and military physician.

Neven-Spence came from a prominent landowning family in the Shetland Islands. Neven-Spence graduated from Edinburgh University in 1911. He served with the Royal Army Medical Corps, seconded to help the Egyptian Army and government of Sudan, and in the First World War, mainly in the Middle East. He received the Order of the Nile for his role in the Darfur Expedition. Following the war he organised a campaign to treat sleeping sickness in Darfur. He returned to the University of Edinburgh to study for an M.D., before moving to Aldershot in 1924 to work as a specialist physician to the British Army. He retired from the Army in 1927 with the rank of Major.

Neven-Spence's family had owned property in Shetland for several generations and he became Vice-Convenor of Zetland County Council.

Neven-Spence first contested the Orkney and Shetland constituency in 1929. He did not contest the seat in 1931, but was elected in 1935 and served as the Member of Parliament until he lost his seat at the 1950 general election to Jo Grimond of the Liberal Party.

He was knighted in 1945 and served as Lord Lieutenant of Shetland from 1952 to 1963.

As of 2024, Neven-Spence is the most recent MP for the Orkney and Shetland constituency to not be from either the Liberal Party or the Liberal Democrats. He once lived on the island of Uyea.

== Family ==
He married Margaret Alice MacKenzie (b. 1887) on 31 May 1917 in Paddington, London, and the couple had three children, daughters Margaret Sunniva Neven-Spence (b. 11 November 1920) and Alice Annette Neven-Spence (b. 11 March 1922) and son Basil St. Clair Neven-Spence (b. 28 June 1925). Sir Basil's son, served in the Colonial Office following serving in World War II. He died by suicide from gunshot at the age of 22, after having been assigned to the island of Tanna in the New Hebrides.

His wife Margaret, died from myocardial degeneration on 22 December 1961 at Busta House Hotel, Shetland Islands. Their eldest child, Margaret Sunniva, married Bernard Maxwell Ward in Westminster on 1 June 1948, and died there on 29 January 1962; just five weeks after the death of her mother.

On 16 April 1963, he married Lady Constance Ella Corbet at Chapel Royal, Hampton Court Palace. The union was short lived, and his second wife died on 13 October 1967, aged 72 years.

Sir Basil Neven-Spence died in Edinburgh on 13 September 1974, aged 86 years, survived only by his daughter Alice; having outlived both of his wives and two of his children.

Parliament of the United Kingdom
Preceded by Sir Robert Hamilton	Member of Parliament for Orkney and Shetland; 1935–1950	Succeeded by Jo Grimond
Honorary titles
Preceded by Sir Arthur Nicolson	Lord Lieutenant of Shetland; 1952–1963	Succeeded by Robert Bruce
