= Arthur Anderson (businessman) =

Scottish businessman and politician (1792-1868)

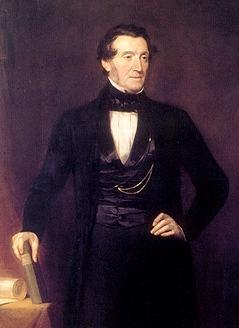
Arthur Anderson (businessman)

Arthur Anderson (19 February 1792 in Shetland – 27 February 1868 in London) was a Scottish businessman and Whig politician. He was co-founder of P&O.

== Career ==
He was born at Böd of Gremista, in Lerwick, and as a boy worked on the beach preparing fish. The Crown attempted to press gang Anderson but Bressay man Thomas Bolt persuaded the Royal Navy to wait until he had finished his apprenticeship before his impressment in 1808. Anderson was discharged 10 years later in Plymouth. Like many Shetland men, he was left destitute 600 miles from home after his service to King and country during the Napoleonic Wars. Anderson moved to London and eventually became a clerk in the London shipping and insurance firm of Brodie McGhie Willcox where he became a partner in 1822 and the firm was renamed Wilcox and Anderson. They developed the shipping business between Britain and the Iberian Peninsula, at one stage shipping guns and the British Legion to fight Portuguese conservatives and Spanish Carlists during their internal wars of the 1830s.

They followed this with a regular steamship service in 1830, called the Peninsular Steam Navigation Company, which became in 1837 P&O. Despite cash crises, it expanded operations to Egypt (1840), India (1842), Hong Kong (1845) and Australia (1852), supported by government mail contracts. Anderson had a thrusting entrepreneurial character and by his death in 1868 P&O had the largest commercial fleet of steamships in the world.

He moved to Streatham, London, and was Chairman of P&O from 1854 until his death. Other chairs included the coal transport company the Union Steam Ship Company (which he created in 1853 to supply his P&O line ships with fuel) and the Crystal Palace Co.

He served as a radical Whig MP for the Orkney and Shetland constituency from 1847 to 1852.

He also founded the Shetland Journal (1835), the Shetland Fishery Company at Vaila, and encouraged fish exports to Spain and business between Shetland and the UK mainland. After Queen Victoria's coronation in 1838, Anderson gave her some Shetland lace articles. The queen subsequently bought twelve pairs of lace stockings which led to a significant increase in sales of Shetland lace.

He endowed Lower Norwood Working Men's Institute, the Anderson Educational Institute in 1862 (later known as the Anderson High School) and a home for the widows of fishermen in Shetland.

He was buried at West Norwood Cemetery, with a memorial at Lerwick Old Cemetery.

His nephew James Anderson, who worked in P&O, was married to the medical pioneer Elizabeth Garrett Anderson.

== Bibliography ==
- Nicolson, John (1914). Arthur Anderson, a Founder of the P. & O. Coy. A. Gardner.

Parliament of the United Kingdom
Preceded by Frederick Dundas	Member of Parliament for Orkney & Shetland; 1847 – 1852	Succeeded by Frederick Dundas
