= Robert Douglas (British politician) =

Robert Douglas (c. 1703 – 30 April 1745) of St Ola, Orkney was a British Army officer and Scottish politician who sat in the House of Commons from 1730 to 1745. He died in battle.

Douglas was the third son of George Douglas, 13th Earl of Morton. He joined the British Army in 1721 as an ensign in the 31st Foot, and became captain in 1732.

When his father succeeded to the peerage in 1730, Douglas was returned unopposed in his place as the Member of Parliament (MP) for Orkney and Shetland at a by-election on 7 May 1730. He voted with the Administration on the army in 1732 and on the Excise Bill in 1733. He was returned unopposed again at the 1734 British general election. In March 1735, he found himself in conflict with the Administration and his father over an election petition. The petition was by William Piers and the ministry had set themselves to turn out the sitting Member, George Hamilton. Douglas voted in honesty and as his conscience dictated for Hamilton. Walpole threatened to take away his commission, and his father threatened to disinherit him but he refused to change his vote. He was still returned unopposed at the 1741 general election and voted consistently with the Administration. He spoke in favour of the Hanoverians in January 1744.

Douglas rose to the rank of lieutenant-colonel of the 3rd Foot Guards in 1740, Colonel in 1743, and also became aide-de-camp to King George II. He served in the campaigns in Flanders, where he was responsible for escorting Marshal Belleisle as a prisoner from the continent to England. Douglas died unmarried in the Battle of Fontenoy on 30 April 1745. When Belleisle heard of his death, he expressed ‘great sorrow on account of [Douglas's] genteel behaviour to him.

Parliament of Great Britain
Preceded by George Douglas	Member of Parliament for Orkney and Shetland; 1730–1745	Succeeded by James Halyburton
