= Robert Hamilton (Liberal politician) =

British politician (1867–1944)

Hamilton in 1920

Sir Robert William Hamilton (26 August 1867 – 5 July 1944) was a Scottish Liberal Party politician and Chief Justice of the East Africa Protectorate.

== Background ==
Hamilton was the second son of Sir Robert G. C. Hamilton who was Governor of Tasmania. He was educated at St Paul's School and Trinity Hall, Cambridge, and was called to the Bar at Inner Temple. He was knighted in 1918. In 1925 he married Gertrude Williamson of Kirkwall, Orkney.

== Professional career ==
Hamilton was appointed an Assistant Judge of the High Court of East Africa in 1902. Three years later, he was in 1905 appointed Principal Judge and Chief Justice of the East Africa Protectorate. He was appointed as Chairman of the Civil Service Commission in 1918. He retired from the civil service in 1920.

== Political career ==
Hamilton was selected as Liberal candidate for the island constituency of Orkney and Shetland at the 1922 general election. The seat was a safe Liberal seat, where at the previous election Sir Malcolm Smith had been returned unopposed. Smith declared himself a supporter of Lloyd George's Coalition Government and sought re-election in 1922 as a National Liberal Party candidate. The two Liberal factions went head to head and Hamilton won the seat;

General election 1922: Orkney and Shetland
Party	Candidate	Votes	%	±%
Liberal	Robert Hamilton	4,814	53.5	n/a
National Liberal	Malcolm Smith	4,189	46.5	n/a
Majority		625	7.0	n/a
Turnout		9,003	37.4	n/a
Liberal gain from National Liberal		Swing	n/a	

He was re-elected at the general election a year later, this time against a Unionist challenger;

General election 1923: Orkney and Shetland
Party	Candidate	Votes	%	±%
Liberal	Robert Hamilton	5,129	54.3	+0.8
Unionist	Robert Boothby	4,318	45.7	n/a
Majority		811	8.6	+1.6
Turnout		9,447	39.1	+1.7
Liberal hold		Swing		

In 1924 he was returned at the general election unopposed. At the 1929 General election he was re-elected with a bigger majority;

General election 1929: Orkney and Shetland
Party	Candidate	Votes	%	±%
Liberal	Robert Hamilton	8,256	60.4	n/a
Unionist	Basil Neven-Spence	5,404	39.6	n/a
Majority		2,852	20.6	n/a
Turnout		13,660	43.1	n/a
Liberal hold		Swing	n/a	

He served as a Parliamentary delegate to South Africa in 1924, to Canada in 1928 and to Iceland in 1930. From 1930 to 1931 he was a member of the first Round Table Conference formed to discuss plans for Indian independence. In 1931 he served on the Joint Select committee on East Africa. When the Liberal Party split in late 1931, Hamilton followed the group led by Sir Herbert Samuel and the official Liberal Party, in support of the National Government. He became Parliamentary Under-Secretary of State for the Colonies in the National Government in September 1931, working under the Conservative Philip Cunliffe-Lister. At the October general election he was returned unopposed. In 1932 he was replaced as Under-Secretary by the Conservative Ivor Windsor-Clive, 2nd Earl of Plymouth. When the Liberal Party decided to leave the National Government in 1933, he followed Samuel across to the opposition benches. He was appointed Scottish Liberal Whip in 1934. He lost his seat at the 1935 general election, to the Conservative Party candidate.

General election 1935: Orkney and Shetland
Party	Candidate	Votes	%	±%
Unionist	Basil Neven-Spence	8,406	57.6	n/a
Liberal	Robert Hamilton	6,180	42.4	n/a
Majority		2,226	15.2	n/a
Turnout		1,586	46.3	n/a
Unionist gain from Liberal		Swing	n/a	

He retired from politics and did not stand again.

Parliament of the United Kingdom
Preceded by Sir Malcolm Smith	Member of Parliament for Orkney and Shetland; 1922–1935	Succeeded by Sir Basil Neven-Spence
Political offices
Preceded by Drummond Shiels	Under-Secretary of State for the Colonies; 1931–1932	Succeeded by The Earl of Plymouth
