= Sholto Douglas, 15th Earl of Morton =

Sholto Charles Douglas, 15th Earl of Morton (c. 1732–25 September 1774) was the son of James Douglas, 14th Earl of Morton.

He was Colonel of a regiment of light dragoons, the 17th Regiment of Light Dragoons, raised in Scotland in 1759 and disbanded in 1763.

In February 1754 he was elected a Fellow of the Royal Society

On 19 November 1758, he married Katherine Hamilton and they had two sons:

- George Douglas, 16th Earl of Morton (1761–1827)
- Lt. Hon. Hamilton Douglas Halyburton (10 October 1763 – 31 December 1783), who died of exposure while commanding the barge of HMS Assistance. His party was caught in a snowstorm while looking for deserters and wrecked on Sandy Hook.

== Notes ==
Masonic offices
Preceded by The Lord Forbes	Grand Master of the Grand Lodge of Scotland; 1755–1757	Succeeded by The Earl of Galloway
Preceded by Marquess of Carnarvon	Grand Master of the Premier Grand Lodge of England; 1757–1762	Succeeded by The Earl Ferrers
Peerage of Scotland
Preceded by James Douglas	Earl of Morton; 1768–1774	Succeeded by George Douglas
