= Frederick Dundas =

British politician

Frederick Dundas (14 June 1802 – 26 October 1872) was a British politician.

== Background ==
Dundas was the son of Charles Dundas, Member of Parliament for Malton, younger son of Thomas Dundas, 1st Baron Dundas. His mother was Lady Caroline, daughter of Aubrey Beauclerk, 5th Duke of St Albans.

== Political career ==
Dundas was returned to Parliament for Orkney and Shetland in 1837, a seat he held until 1847 and again between 1852 and 1872.

== Family ==
Dundas married Grace, daughter of Sir Ralph Gore, 7th Baronet, on 2 June 1847. She died on 15 January 1868. Dundas survived her by four years and died on 26 October 1872, aged 70.

Parliament of the United Kingdom
Preceded by Thomas Balfour	Member of Parliament for Orkney and Shetland; 1837–1847	Succeeded by Arthur Anderson
Preceded by Arthur Anderson	Member of Parliament for Orkney and Shetland; 1852–1872	Succeeded by Samuel Laing
Honorary titles
Preceded by Charles Dundas	Lord Lieutenant of Orkney and Shetland; 1866–1872	Succeeded by John Charles Dundas
