= Coopers Lagoon / Muriwai =

Lagoon in Canterbury Region, New Zealand

- Muriwai o Whata (Māori)
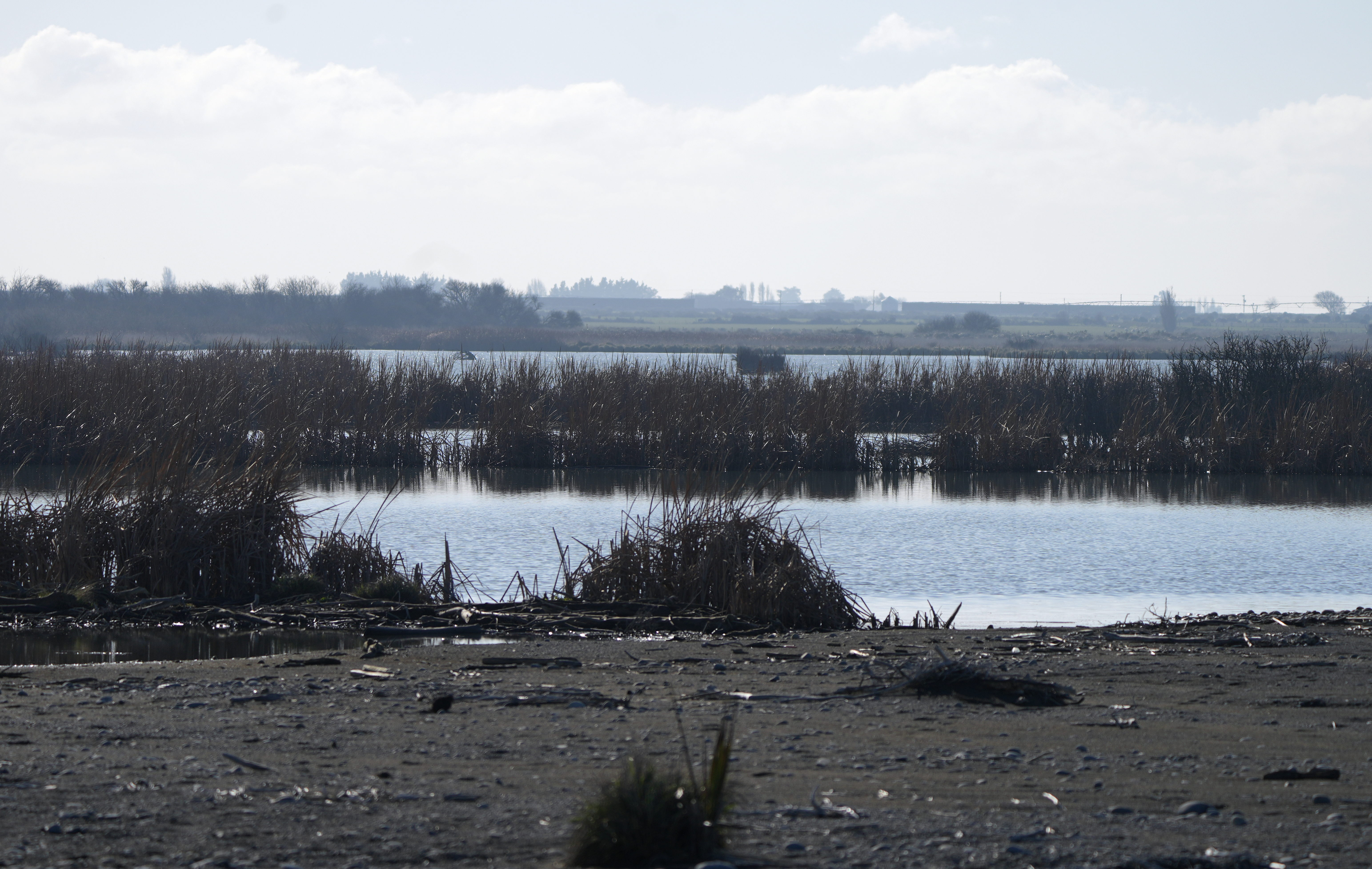
- Coopers Lagoon / Muriwai as seen in July during the early afternoon, 2024. Beds of raupo reeds can be seen, in addition to hides for waterfowl hunting.

- Location within New Zealand
- Location: Selwyn District and Christchurch City, Canterbury region, South Island
- Coordinates: 43.8583°S 172.3001°E
- Type: Brackish lagoon
- Primary inflows: Youngs Creek
- Basin countries: New Zealand
- Max. length: 1.15 km (0.71 mi)
- Max. width: 0.76 km (0.47 mi)
- Surface area: 2 ha (4.9 acres)
- Max. depth: 2.1 m (6 ft 11 in)
- Surface elevation: 3 metres (9.8 ft)

Coopers Lagoon / Muriwai is a small coastal waituna-type lagoon in the Canterbury region of New Zealand, located approximately halfway between the mouth of the Rakaia River and the outlet of the much larger Lake Ellesmere / Te Waihora. While the present-day lagoon is separated from the nearby Canterbury Bight by approximately 100 metres (330 ft), the water of the lagoon is considered brackish and early survey maps show that, until recently, the lagoon was connected to the ocean by a small channel. The lagoon, along with the surrounding wetlands, has historically been an important mahinga kai (site of traditional significance for food and other natural resources) for local Māori.

In 1998, Coopers Lagoon was officially given a dual place name as part of a Treaty of Waitangi settlement with Ngāi Tahu, receiving the name Coopers Lagoon / Muriwai.

== Ecology ==
Coopers Lagoon / Muriwai is recognised as a nationally significant habitat for birdlife, forming part of a chain of waituna and hāpua extending along the east coast of the South Island from Lake Grassmere / Kapara Te Hau in the north to Washdyke and Waituna lagoons further south. Approximately 70 species of animals and 50 species of plants have been identified at the lagoon, including birds such as the pūkeko, bar-tailed godwit and kāki as well as the shortfin and longfin eels, whitebait and freshwater crayfish, among others. The lagoon is also home to mysis shrimps in the genus Tenagomysis, which form swarms in the lagoon. The lagoon is also New Zealand's largest wild breeding population of the introduced mute swan, and an important winter habitat for the white-winged tern. Muriwai's proximity to the much larger Te Waihora heavily influences its ecology, with an 1865 survey of the region showing a network of wetlands between the two locations. Despite these wetlands since being converted to farmland, this relationship remains important to the lagoon.

As with several other coastal lagoons in the Canterbury region, Coopers Lagoon / Muriwai is rated as having a poor water quality. Water quality ratings since 2004 have shown the lagoon to have a trophic level index of between 4-5, classifying the lagoon as eutrophic. Despite being 100 metres (330 ft) from the ocean, the amount of springs which feed the lagoon mean that it is primarily freshwater, with the exception of a small portion of saltwater marsh near the lagoon's northeastern corner.

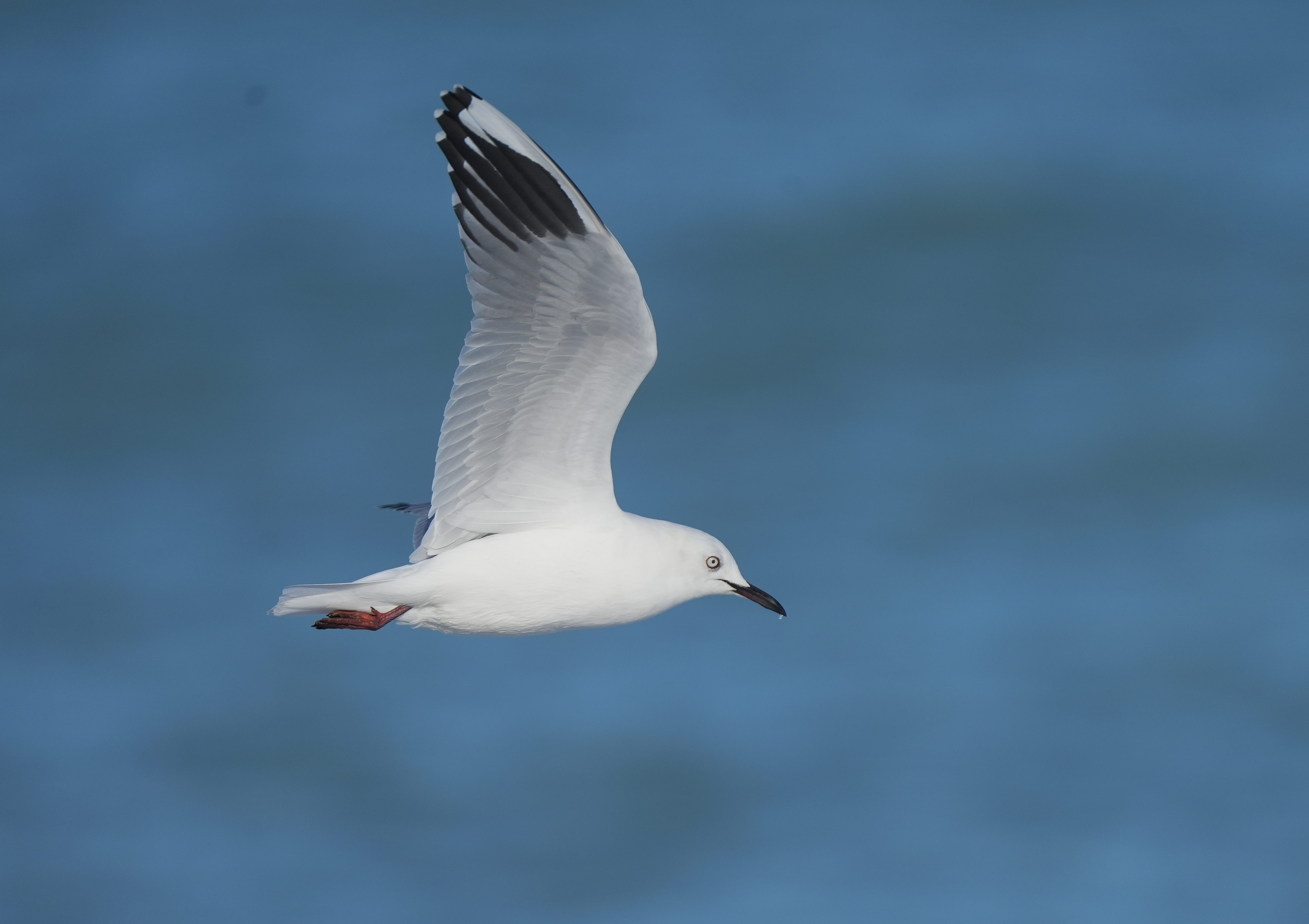
Black-Billed Gull (Chroicocephalus bulleri) flying past Coopers Lagoon. Black-Billed Gulls are one of many birds that can be seen flying over the lagoon or along the local coastline.

== Human interaction ==
Muriwai has traditionally been of large importance to Māori as a food source and is recognised as a wāhi taonga (place of significance) for local Hapū. The lagoon is associated with local legends, which hold that a person named Tuna-o-ruka-i-te-raki descended from heaven to live in the lagoon as a serpent. This serpent was said to have been captured and dismembered by residents of a local village and its parts cast into the water, where the parts became various species of eel known to Māori. Māori access to Muriwai for food gradually decreased as European settlement surrounding the lake increased, causing the quality of natural resources managed by local hapū at the lagoon to decline.

In 1998, control of the lakebed and surrounding area were vested in Ngāi Tahu with the passage of the Ngāi Tahu Claims Settlement Act 1998, part of a landmark Treaty of Waitangi settlement which also included the renaming of the lagoon to its current dual name. This began a new period of Māori engagement with the lagoon, culminating in the 2016 publication of a joint management plan with Environment Canterbury to support the restoration of the original wetland environment in the area. The lagoon is also popular with hunters and fisherman, with pre-established maimai for waterfowl hunting expressly protected from removal by the Ngāi Tahu Settlement Act.
