= Irwell =

Irwell may refer to:

- River Irwell in England
- Irwell River (New Zealand)
- SS Irwell, a British freight ship
- Irwell, New Zealand, a place in New Zealand

== See also ==
- Irwell, Australian brand of tapware produced by Caroma
