= Irwell River =

Irwell River may refer to:

- River Irwell in North West England
- Irwell River, New Zealand
