= Muriwai (disambiguation) =

Muriwai is a coastal community in the Auckland Region of New Zealand.

Muriwai can also refer to:

- Muriwai, Gisborne, settlement and rural community in the Gisborne District of New Zealand
- Coopers Lagoon / Muriwai, lagoon in Canterbury Region of New Zealand
- Muriwai (rangatira) (died 1828), Māori chief
- Muriwai gecko, species of lizard
- Muriwai (Whakatōhea whare), marae in Opape, New Zealand
