= Washdyke Lagoon =

- Waitarakao (Māori)
- Location within New Zealand
- Location: Canterbury, New Zealand
- Coordinates: 44.3637°S 171.2525°E
- Type: lagoon
- Surface area: 48 hectares (0.48 km^{2})

Washdyke Lagoon (known in Māori as Waitarakao) is a brackish shallow coastal lagoon approximately 1 kilometre (0.62 mi) north of Timaru, South Canterbury, New Zealand. The lagoon has drastically reduced in size since 1881 when it was approximately 253 hectares (630 acres), now it is less than 48 hectares (0.48 km^{2}) in area. It is enclosed by a barrier beach that is 3 kilometres (1.9 mi) long and 3 metres (9.8 ft) above high tide at its largest point (see Figure 1). The reduced lagoon size is due to the construction of the Timaru Port breakwater which is preventing coarse sediments from reaching and replenishing Washdyke Barrier. This is important as the lagoon and the surrounding 250 hectares (620 acres) are classified as a wildlife refuge and it demonstrates the role human structures have on coastline evolution.

== Classification ==
Washdyke Lagoon is a coastal lake, ‘choked’ type lagoon as it is separated from the sea by a built-up bar, and has only minimal tidal input (<5% of total tidal impact to coast within the lagoon). Lagoons of this type usually form along high energy, microtidal coastlines, have high ratio of fresh to salt water and rarely open to the ocean. This type of lagoon differs from more ‘open’ lagoons which are open to the ocean through one or more channels, have a lower percentage of fresh water and form directly at the end of large river mouths. Lagoons form when longshore transport builds up sediment across the mouth of a water source cutting it off or diverting it from directly reaching the ocean. In order for a lagoon to form the barrier needs both a coarse and fine sediment source, the fines usually from longshore transport offshore and the coarse usually from transport of sediment from river mouths. The barriers created rely on the accretion of sediment to at least equal the rate of erosion in order for the lagoon to remain separate from the ocean. This balance is also effected by sea level changes, rising causing the barrier to be overtopped and falling allowing a smaller barrier keep the lagoon separate.

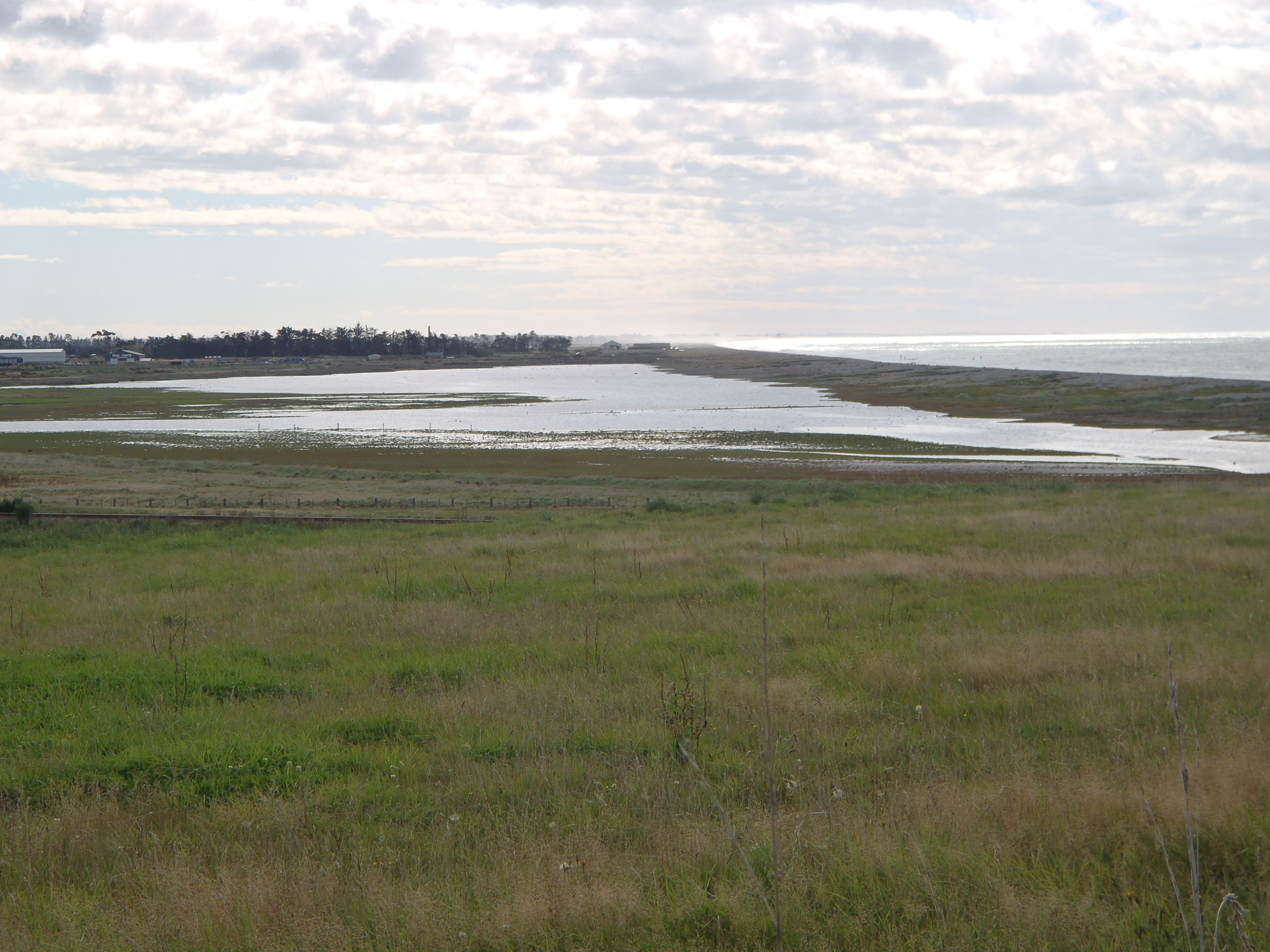
Figure 1:Photograph of Washdyke Lagoon taken from its Southern end.

There are many examples of these relatively closed lagoon systems around the world. Most have significant ecological value, so preserving the balance between fresh and salt water is important. Examples include the Coorong, Australia, 260 square kilometres (100 sq mi), Laguna de Araruama (Brazil, 10,360 square kilometres (4,000 sq mi)), Lake St. Lucia (South Africa, 312 square kilometres (120 sq mi)) and Lake Songkhla (Thailand, 1,040 square kilometres (400 sq mi)). If the sediment sources for these barriers was to be removed their barriers would be eroded away and bays would form in the lagoons place with inundation.

== Formation and Setting ==
Washdyke Lagoon was created by the formation of a mixed sand and gravel (MSG) beach barrier (Figure 2) allowing fluvial water from Washdyke Creek to accumulate behind it, with some tidal infiltration through the barrier. The MSG barrier type is relatively rare and has its own unique set of processes and morphology. MSG barriers form mostly on paraglacial coasts where there is a large amount of coarse grained sediments available and storm wave conditions during which more sediment load is transported ashore. They also form steep slopes in high wave energy environments and have very high levels of seepage of freshwater into the ocean, due to the large grain size range increasing permeability. Another characteristic is the zonation of sediments on the barrier. Coarse, flat sediments form the crest, whilst large, spherical and rod shape sediments form the outer part and the barrier infill is made up of finer sediment sizes. Washdyke Lagoon is a useful example of a barrier that displays all of these characteristics.

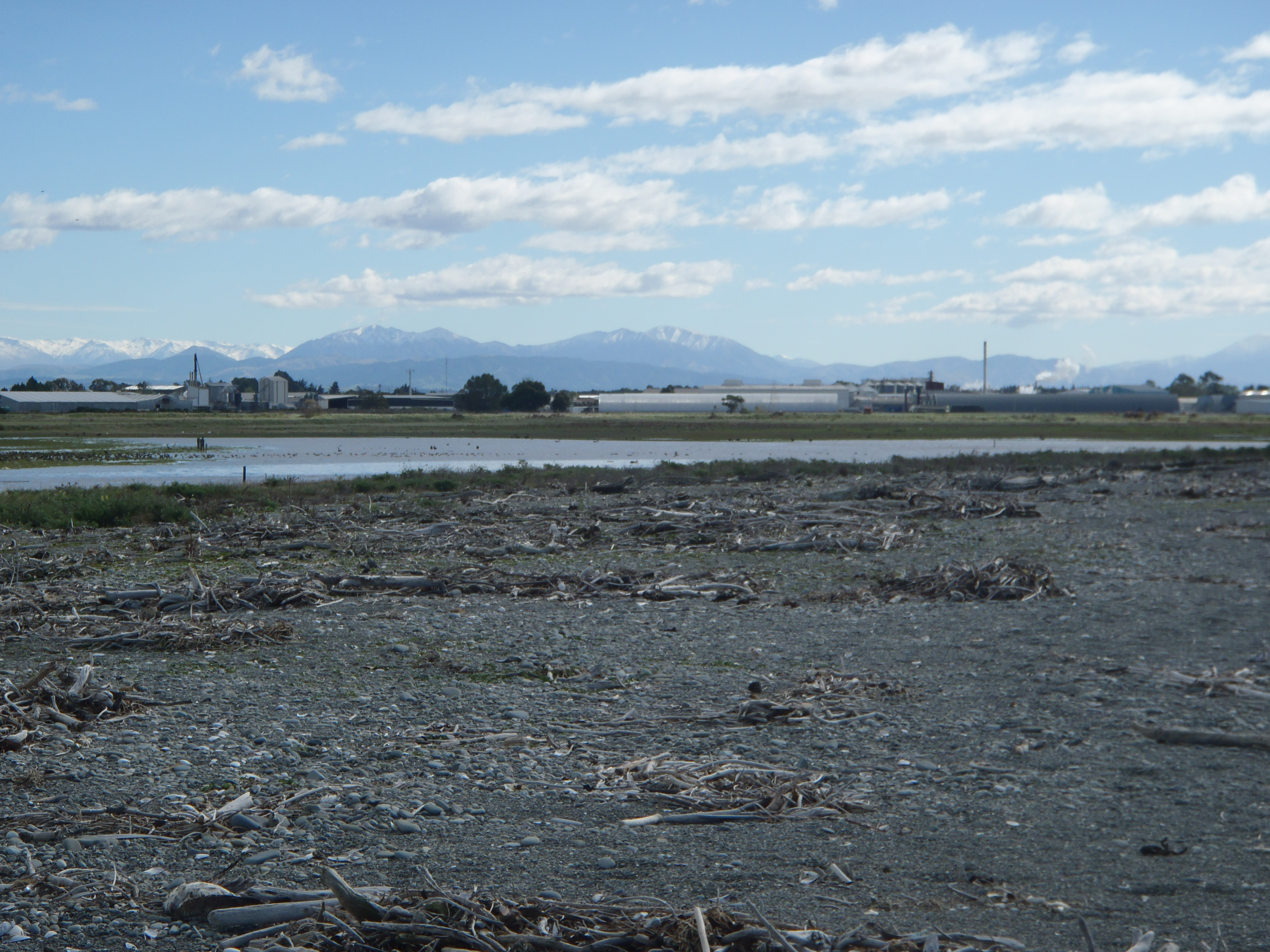
Figure 2:Photograph of the mixed sand and gravel (MSG) barrier of Washdyke Lagoon

The lagoon is situated at the southern end of the Canterbury Bight. This coastline is characterised by its mixed sand and gravel beaches and southerly longshore currents. These currents transport coarse greywacke sediments that have reached the coast down braided rivers that originated at the Southern Alps and fine sediments from further offshore. Southerly currents push them north and they are then deposited on Washdyke Barrier causing it to stay above the high tide mark and form the lagoon.

The southerly current travelling up from south of the South Island of New Zealand has formed a chain of lagoons along the east and south coast of the island, including Waituna, Wainono and Washdyke Lagoons, Coopers Lagoon / Muriwai, and Lake Ellesmere / Te Waihora. Like Washdyke, these closed lagoons are also facing the possibility of becoming much more open systems in the near future.

Currently Kaitorete Spit (enclosing Lake Ellesmere / Te Waihora) is undergoing erosion, especially at its southern end, due to coastal rotation of currents. It is also possible that it will permanently breach forming an open bay in the coming decades.

Waituna Lagoon is also under threat from breaching but in this case it is machinery not erosion that is opening the coastal lake to the ocean. This is so that it can be used for hunting and allow grazing at its banks. However, it is now been opened more frequently increasing the natural salinity of the lagoon. The effects of this on native fish and bird species are still not fully understood.

== Management Issues ==
Currently the lagoon is shrinking at an alarming rate. The barrier has retreated 400 metres (1,300 ft) between 1865 and 1987 (3.2 metres (10 ft) per year). In 1992 it was predicted that by the year 2000 the lagoon would have totally disappeared. Whilst this has not yet happened it is still a possibility in the near future. This would cause flooding of the Washdyke industrial area and the loss of habitat for the wildlife within the refuge.

The drastic reduction in area of the lagoon can be at least partially attributed to the construction of the Timaru Port, which started in 1878. In building the port's 700 metres (2,300 ft) long breakwater (Figure 3) the sediment supply from the south is blocked from reaching the Washdyke Lagoon area. Since the construction the Washdyke-Opihi coast has lost 2,620,000 cubic metres (93,000,000 cu ft) of sediment per year, whilst the coast to the south of the port is accumulating sediment forming 80 hectare of new land. This is a large loss to the north of the port that can not be replaced by current longshore transport mechanisms.

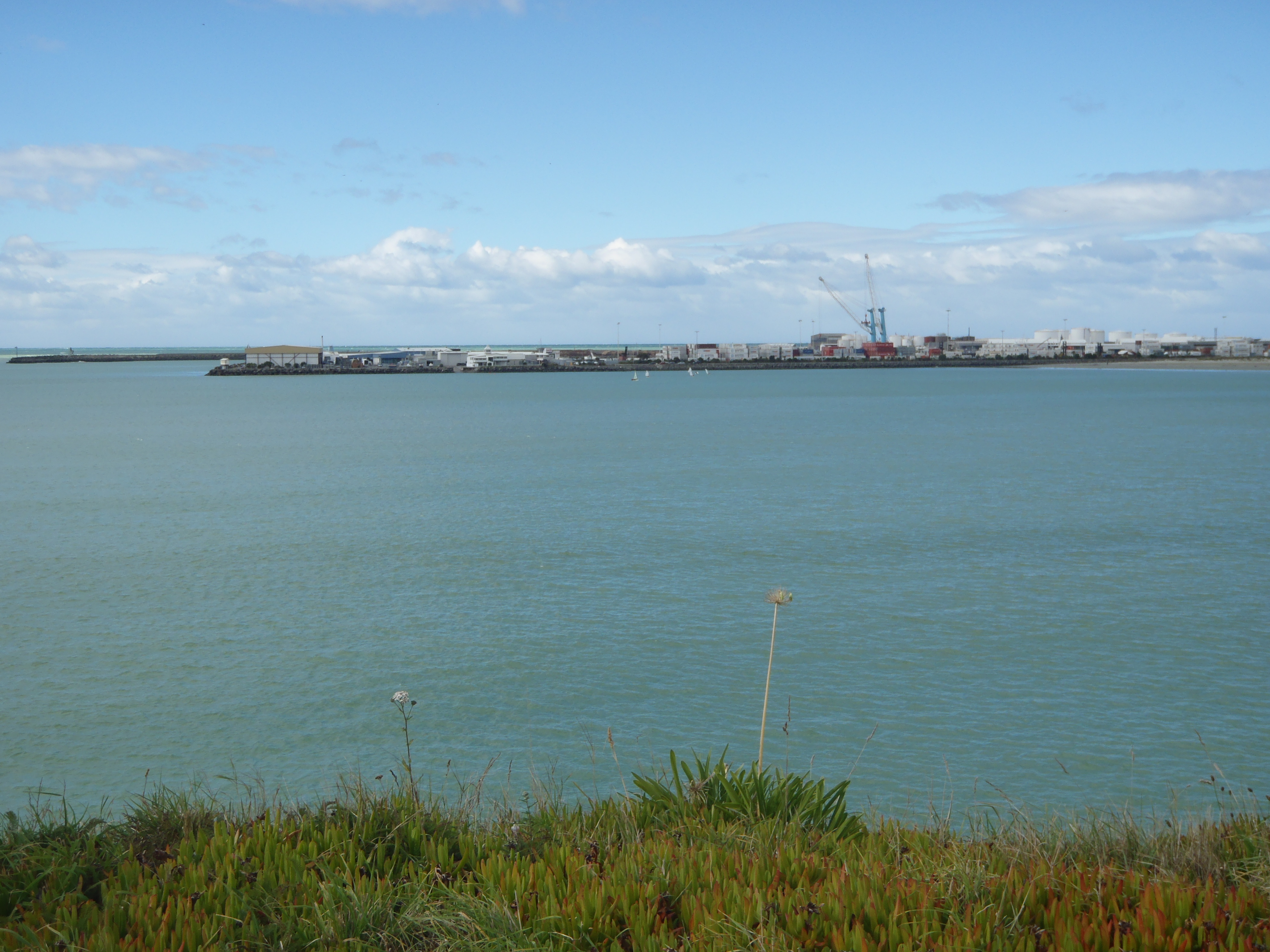
Figure 3:Photograph of Timaru Port Breakwater, showing its large scale.

The port's breakwater starves the barrier of coarse sediments from the rivers to the south. As shown in Figure 4, prior to breakwater construction fine and coarse sediments were transported from the south and deposited on Washdyke Barrier. However, after the breakwater was built the coarse sediment is unable to reach the barrier as it accumulates at the port's southern side. Some sediment is supplied further offshore by bypassing the breakwater but this is a much reduced load.

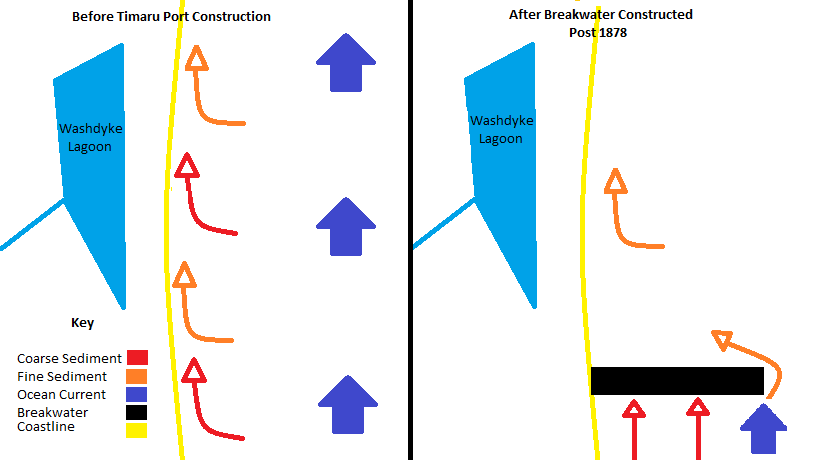
Figure 4:Diagram contrasting longshore sediment transport pre- and post-port construction.

Without sediment supply erosion of the barrier is rapid as normal processes such as washover continue. This happens when waves hit the barrier and push sediment from the ocean side to the lagoon side, there is no incoming sediment on the ocean side to rebuild the barrier. This means that the barrier migrate landward as the barrier ridges are reworked. The ratio of fine to coarse sediments making up the barrier is also increased. The coarse sediments armour the barrier structure against ocean swell and wind waves, without this sediment the fines are much more vulnerable to being removed leaving the barrier structure more vulnerable. Maximum wave height for this section of coast during one October was found to be 6.3 metres (21 ft), and other studies have recorded frequent breakers around 5 metres (16 ft) high. This means that the barrier would frequently have to deal with overtopping events.

Another factor that is preventing the supply of coarse sediment to the lagoon barrier is the damming of the Waitaki River. The dam was constructed by 1934 as part of a hydroelectric scheme and is the only braided river in New Zealand that is dammed. It is estimated that the dam stops 50% of the bed load transport.

The amount of sediment that is supplied to the barrier is the most important aspect in determining barrier alignment and breakdown. This was shown studying the coastal barriers on the Atlantic coast of Nova Scotia. This is particularly important as these barriers are one of the few other MSG beaches internationally.

Another, more local site very relevant to the issues at Washdyke Lagoon is Waimataitai Lagoon. This lagoon was situated just north of the Port of Timaru (South of Washdyke Lagoon and Dashing Rocks) prior to 1933. The barrier enclosing the lagoon began to erode rapidly after the construction of the port resulting in the complete destruction of the lagoon, leaving behind an open bay in its place.

Internationally, sediment starvation is causing the erosion of many important coastal features. Breakwaters and other man-made structures in Thailand are responsible for accelerated beach erosion which may start to affect tourism in the coming years. In Hallsands, Devon, England, a combination of an existing seawall and new gravel dredging to form a harbour from 1986 to 1902, caused the erosion of the whole village by 1917. This was due to sediment starvation causing the erosion of the mixed sand and gravel barrier beaches which protected the village. They are not alone, the effects of man-made structures on restricting or diverting natural sediment transport are now well known and to some extent there is now a move away from these.

There is also an issue surrounding the pollution of the lagoon. Nearby freezing works have previously pumped waste water into the lagoon. Workers in charge of checking this discharge pipe also noted thinning of the barrier as early as 1897. More recently there has been concern about the pollution runoff from the Washdyke industrial area immediately to the west of the lagoon.

Another source of pollutants was the sewage outfall pipe which ended on the ocean side of the middle of the barrier and was in use until 1998. This pipe was constantly at risk to exposure and damage as the barrier eroded and would have contributed pollutants and caused nitrification in the lagoon.

== Remediation and Future Management ==
Every ten months the entrance to the Timaru Port is dredged in order to keep the channel deep enough for use as a commercial port. Each time around 100,000 cubic metres (3,500,000 cu ft) of fine grained sediments are removed. It was proven that 20% of these tailings are coarse enough to benefit Washdyke Barrier, so tailings have been dumped off the Washdyke coast since the early 1990s. However 80% of this material is unsuitable due to the fine, weathered nature of the sediments, making them less resistant to wave activity than the sediment source prior to port construction.

From 1979 to 1985 the Timaru City Council commissioned a length of the Washdyke Barrier to be renourished in order to protect a sewage outfall pipe and ascertain whether or not the system would viably protect the barrier structure. A 300 metres (980 ft) section of the barrier was raised 2–2.5 metres (6 ft 7 in – 8 ft 2 in) using sediments which have rolled over the barrier and are now on the lagoon side, then armouring them with coarse sediments brought in from Opihi River (12 kilometres (7.5 mi) away). Despite the overall findings of the report being that the project was 'technically and economically feasible' no further renourishment work of the barrier has been undertaken. However, the effects of the renourishment on this section of the barrier is still evident (as of 2006).

Further work is needed in order to show the best way to maintain the bar economically and environmentally. This work needs to be site specific due to the unique morphodynamics and challenges that the lagoon is facing. Mixed sand and gravel barriers are an area that is being continuously studied and some long term behaviours are still not understood. A challenge to future work is that the Timaru Port is a major economic driver in the region and sections of the community may feel that Washdyke Lagoon is a necessary sacrifice.

== Ecological Value ==
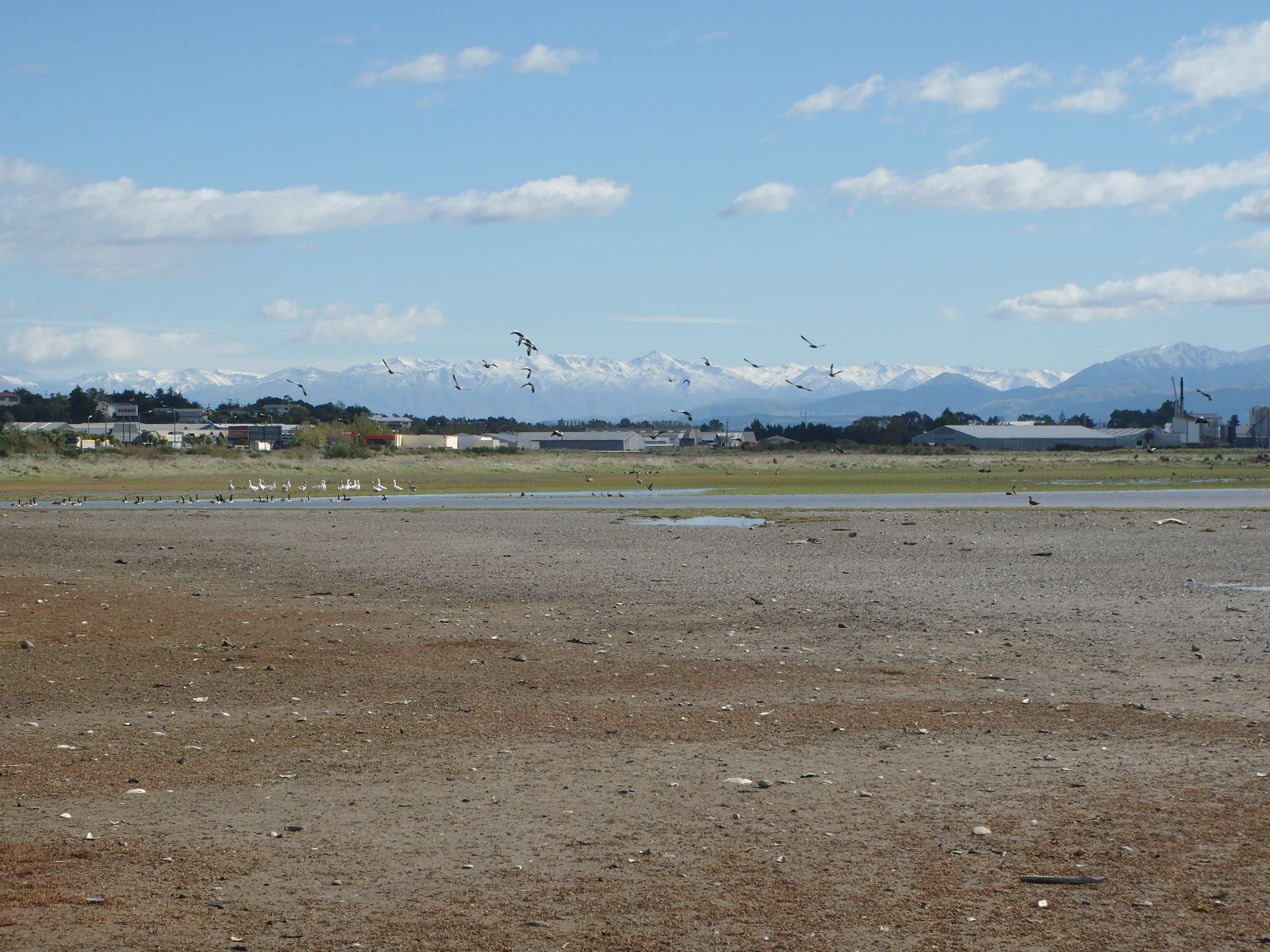
Figure 5:Photograph showing birds over Washdyke Lagoon.

Washdyke Lagoon is a feeding ground for a variety of birds including waterfowl, handfuls of migratory godwits and sandpipers, herons and other species of water birds (Figure 5). Gulls and dotterels nest on the shingle barrier of the eastern side. However, in recent years black-fronted dotterel numbers have been declining. Saltmarsh ribbonwood, rushes and exotic plants can be found on the margins of the lagoon. A reef borders part of the coast just off the barrier, attracting oystercatchers and turnstones. The area is also popular for catching whitebait off the barrier.

The ecology of lagoon systems is lost if the sediment sources for these barriers is removed and their barriers erode away, bays then form in the lagoons place with inundation. This is what will happen at Washdyke Lagoon and other lagoons around the world if human activities continue to starve natural sediment supplies. This will have ecological implications and will also allow for flooding of land previously protected by the lagoon, such as the Washdyke industrial area.

== See also ==
- Lagoon
- Longshore Drift
- Sediment transport
- Coastal erosion
- Kaitorete Spit
- Lake Ellesmere / Te Waihora
- Canterbury Bight
- Waituna Wetlands Scientific Reserve
