= Canterbury Bight =

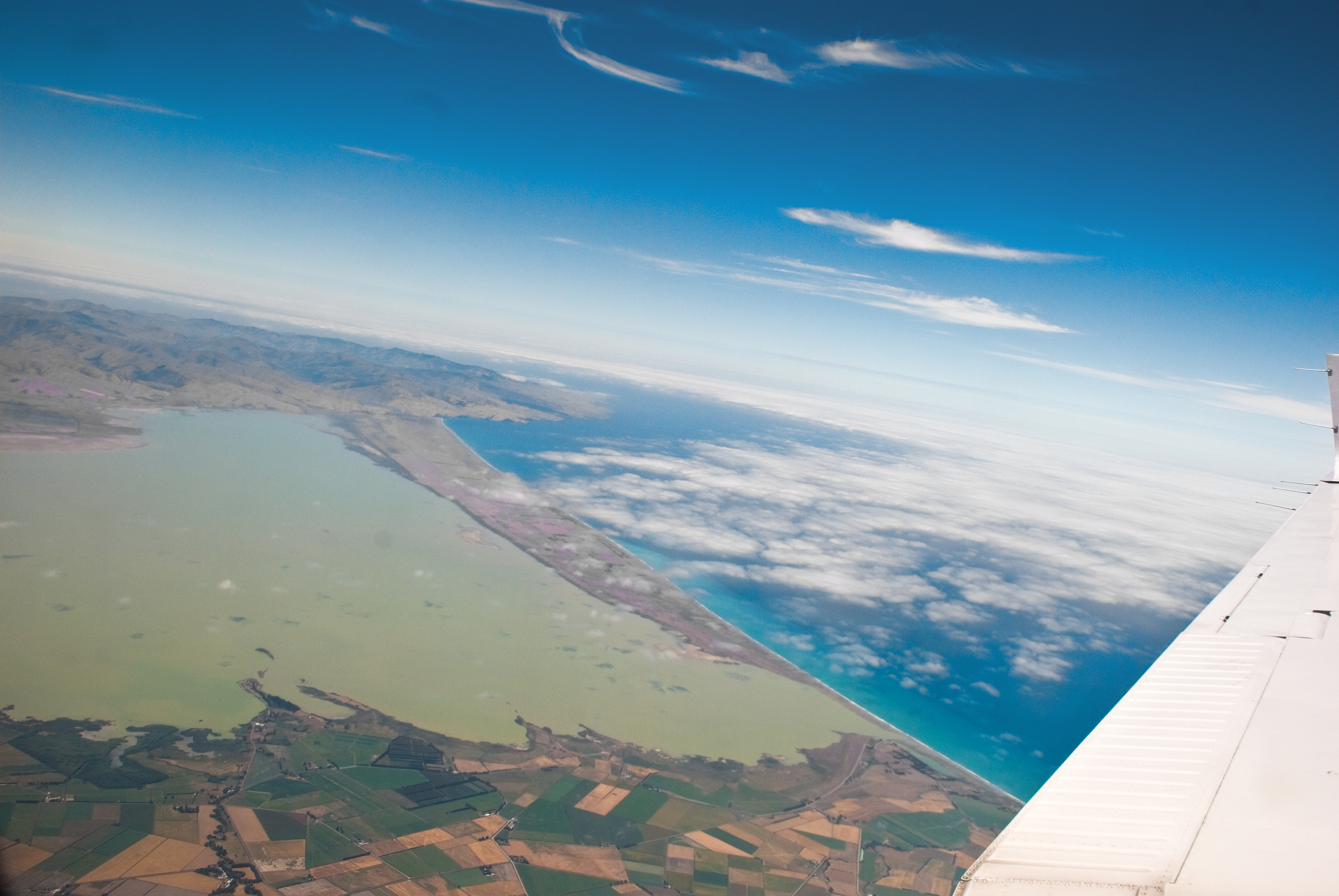
- Aerial view of Kaitorete Spit and Lake Ellesmere / Te Waihora, showing the northern end of the Canterbury Bight

- The Canterbury Bight takes up much of the Cantabrian coast south of Banks Peninsula. Canterbury Bight (Oceania)
- Location: Canterbury, New Zealand
- Coordinates: 44°15′S 171°38′E
- Type: Oceanic bight
- Primary inflows: Lake Ellesmere / Te Waihora, Rakaia River, Ashburton River / Hakatere, Rangitata River
- Primary outflows: Pacific Ocean
- Basin countries: New Zealand
- Settlements: Timaru

The Canterbury Bight is a large bight on the eastern side of New Zealand's South Island. The bight runs for approximately 135 kilometres (84 mi) from the southern end of Banks Peninsula to the settlement of Timaru and faces southeast, exposing it to high-energy storm waves originating in the Pacific Ocean. The bight is known for rough conditions as a result, with wave heights of over 2 metres (6.6 ft) common. Much of the bight's geography is shaped by this high-energy environment interacting with multiple large rivers which enter the Pacific in the bight, such as the Rakaia, Ashburton / Hakatere, and Rangitata Rivers. Sediment from these rivers, predominantly Greywacke, is deposited along the coast and extends up to 50 kilometres (31 mi) out to sea from the current shoreline. Multiple hapua, or river-mouth lagoons, can be found along the length of the bight where waves have deposited sufficient sediment to form a barrier across a river mouth, including most notably Lake Ellesmere / Te Waihora and Washdyke Lagoon

== Zones of the Canterbury Bight ==
The Canterbury Bight can be split into three distinct regions: the Southern Zone, Central Zone and Northern Zone.

=== Southern Zone ===
The Southern Zone runs from Dashing Rocks at Timaru in the south to the Rangitata River mouth in the north. Features include the Washdyke Barrier and Washdyke Lagoon.

=== Central Zone ===
The Central Zone is the largest and runs between the Rangitata River mouth and Taumutu on the southern end of Kaitorete Spit. Unconsolidated alluvial cliffs interbedded with sands and silts, which back steep, narrow, mixed sand and gravel beaches, unify this zone. The cliffs are the result of erosion of the Rangitata River, Ashburton River / Hakatere and Rakaia River alluvial fans, whose mouths are all encompassed by this region. Continued cliff erosion contributes around 70% of the coarse material supplied to the mixed sand and gravel beaches of the Canterbury Bight.

=== Northern Zone ===
The Northern Zone runs from Taumutu to Banks Peninsula and represents the 'down-drift' end of the bight. This zone is dominated by the Kaitorete Spit (actually a barrier) and is backed extensively by dune systems. Kaitorete 'Spit' encloses Lake Ellesmere / Te Waihora, the fourth largest lake in New Zealand. This is the only zone that is not in a long-term erosional state.

== Sediment inputs ==
Generally speaking, there are six potential sediment sources for beach environments. These are longshore transport, onshore transport, wind transport, river transport (and alluvial cliffs for the Canterbury Bight), biogenous (mainly in shell form) deposition and hydrogenous deposition. In the Canterbury Bight system, wind transport and biogenous and hydrogenous deposition can be excluded as agents of sediment inputs. Wind can be excluded as it acts to remove sediment from the beach although this is not a significant amount. Biogenous deposition can be excluded as the high-energy environment and coarse sediment deter shelled animals from occupying the area. Lastly, hydrogenous deposition is not considered important to the Canterbury Bight system. This means that rivers, longshore transport and onshore transport are the main sediment sources for the Canterbury Bight.

=== Rivers ===
Erosion of the alluvial cliffs (and subsequent longshore transport) through the Central Zone of the Canterbury Bight is believed to provide the majority of coarse material to the beach system. This creates a conundrum, as rivers are generally accepted to be the main source of sediment to coasts and three large rivers (Rangitata, Ashburton and Rakaia) discharge into the Canterbury Bight. Furthermore, the total amount of sediment that the rivers transport to the coast is proportional to other rivers worldwide. The first reason the rivers do not provide a significant amount of sediment to the coast is that the coarse sediment (i.e. gravels) are transported offshore during floods where waves are unable to return it to the coast and/or it is deposited further inland within the river channel. The second reason is that the material capable of nourishing the coastline (i.e. coarse material like gravels) provided by rivers is estimated to only be around 176,700m3/yr although this value is very speculative. This estimate of coarse sediment supply only equates for less than 10% (by weight) of sediment supplied by the river systems. The remaining 90% (by weight) is fine material, which is unable to nourish the Canterbury Bight and is transported offshore.

=== Alluvial cliffs ===
The erosion of alluvial cliffs found in the central zone is predominantly caused by sub-aerial processes followed by marine processes removing the eroded material. This eroded material is then subjected to longshore transport, which in the case of the Canterbury Bight is predominantly from south to north. Estimates for the rate of erosion vary along the coast but are averaged at about 8m/yr (landward retreat), although high erosion levels at one site may influence this value. The marine processes include swash and backwash, with the larger storm induced waves creating stronger swash/backwash, which removes more eroded material. The amount of gravel provided to the coast from the cliffs is estimated at around 666,400m3/yr although this value is also speculative.

=== Onshore transport ===
Onshore transport of sediment is considered a secondary sediment source for the Canterbury Bight. In the offshore zone, sediment movement is unimpeded as the local bathymetry of the continental shelf is relatively flat with no major obstructions. Because of this storm waves are thought to be capable of moving sediment onshore (by increasing water velocity near the bed) although due to the highly turbulent swash/backwash zone, only a small portion of sediment will remain onshore.

== Sediment outputs ==
Evidence for longshore transport is readily apparent on the Canterbury Bight. These include the formation of the Kaitorete Barrier, a landform associated with longshore sediment transport. The Canterbury Bight is not eroding due to net longshore transport exceeding sediment inputs however as firstly, Banks Peninsula and the basalt cliffs at Dashing Rocks prevent significant longshore transport out of the Canterbury Bight system by obstructing further transport. Secondly, longshore transport appears to have abated as little sediment has accumulated at the down-drift end of the bight since the 1950s suggesting sediment is lost from beaches before reaching Banks Peninsula. This has been attributed to sediment becoming finer after undergoing abrasion, which allows it to be winnowed from the beach. To further this conclusion, backwash is significantly weaker than swash as there is a lot of percolation through the coarse beach material. Weaker backwash means that sediment must be smaller in order for it to be removed from the beach. Estimations for the amount of sediment losses due to abrasion differ greatly with studies giving figures of 76%, 9-98% and 5-65%.

== Sediment transport mechanisms ==
=== Longshore transport ===
Sediment removed from the cliffs, brought onshore from offshore and the sediment supplied by rivers that remains in the lower foreshore zone undergoes longshore transport. The main agents are swash and backwash, which act to move the material up and down the beach in a zigzag fashion. Almost all of the changes in beach morphology and sediment distribution observed are produced by swash and backwash. The direction and rate of longshore sediment transport is a function of the angle of wave approach, wave strength and the time between successive waves. The end result of this is a net northward migration of coarse sediment, predominantly in the swash zone. This is because only swell/waves moving from south to north are generally strong enough to move large sediment. Sediment removed from the backshore is predominantly moved offshore rather than along shore as only large southerly storm waves and their subsequent swash, which usually flow perpendicular to the beach are able to reach this area. The direction of wave approach is often relatively perpendicular due to wave refraction. This means that longshore transport mainly occurs in the nearshore swash zone.

=== Wind ===
Wind also plays a part in the transportation of sediment. The most frequent velocities reached by winds on the Canterbury Bight are capable of moving medium to coarse sized sand particles. These winds are attributed with the movement of sand from the beach towards the dunes including the extensive dune ridges along the Kaitorete Barrier. Wind also has a secondary effect of sediment transport, especially strong winds following southerly swell. These winds force the wave crests of the southerly storm waves to spill (spilling breakers). Spilling breakers produce a longer and stronger swash. Given that swash is a component of longshore drift on the Canterbury Bight, it is easy to assume that these waves will inherently cause an increase in sediment transport, particularly from south to north. But as discussed earlier, storm waves act more to remove sediment offshore than along it.

== Coastal management ==
=== Current erosion conditions ===
Erosion is occurring along 75% of the Canterbury Bight. In the long term, most mixed sand and gravel beaches are in an erosional state due to the lack of available coarse sediment needed to withstand the high-energy environments they reside in. In the Northern Zone however, from Taumutu to Birdlings Flat/Banks Peninsula conditions are relatively stable as longshore transport into the zone is small, but sufficient to maintain a relative equilibrium. The Central Zone, from the Rangitata River mouth to Taumutu is experiencing the worst erosion along the Bight. Estimates vary on the rate of erosion but an average of 8m/yr is given, however this value may be influenced by high erosion levels at one site. The height of the cliffs characterizing this zone and the size of the beach in front of them are a controlling factor for erosion rates. The Southern Zone, from Dashing Rocks Timaru to the Rangitata river mouth is also undergoing erosion although at rates not as severe as seen along the Central Zone. The Washdyke Barrier is the major concern in this zone.

Management of the Canterbury Bight is controlled and regulated by Environment Canterbury (Ecan). Ecan believes that in many instances, the increased risk of erosion and seawater inundation are caused by the inappropriate location of assets and activities and by a reliance on inadequate works to protect from the ocean. To investigate coastal hazards, Ecan; establish and maintain co-operation with weather and tsunami forecasting agencies in the issuing of warnings about potentially damaging natural events, assess the effect of hazards on the coast and regularly collect data on sea/shoreline conditions to determine any changes in occurrence of hazards and the physical nature of the coast as well as determine areas requiring hazard mitigation.

=== Current coastal management initiatives ===
Erosion, and subsequent sea water inundation poses a serious threat along the length of the Canterbury Bight. To date, erosion has led to the loss of agricultural land, threatened valuable infrastructure and some holiday settlements, and reduced coastal lagoons and wetlands. One of the main areas of concern is the Washdyke barrier. The shoreline at Washdyke was naturally eroding before construction of the Timaru harbour commenced in 1879. The harbour has prevented sediment being transported from the south meaning that no coarse sediment is able to nourish the Washdyke beach/barrier. The material that is currently on the beach is undergoing abrasion (discussed above), which has reduced grain sizes and lowered the berm heights increasing the amount of washover, which further increases erosion.

This process has created a significant hazard, as the Washdyke barrier is the only line of protection between the high-energy ocean and valuable infrastructure including State Highway 1, an important railway and a large industrial area. Additionally, the barrier protects the Washdyke Lagoon, which is a valued wildlife area.

In 1980, to manage the erosion hazard of the Washdyke barrier beach crest heights were raised 2.0–2.5m to minimise washover, washover sediment was used to fill the body of the beach and river gravels were used to cap the beach crest. This programme was monitored over five years and showed that erosion was decreased by 55%, with no retreat or washover. Untreated adjacent beaches experienced significant retreat over the five-year period showing the programme was very successful.

=== Recommendations for coastal management ===
There is a clear need for further mitigation to coastal erosion hazards along the bight through coastal management. The Washdyke barrier re-nourishment has proved a successful venture for that area although it has only lessened the threat, rather than completely removed it. The success of the re-nourishment programme means it should be used again for this area. Along the Central Zone of the Canterbury Bight, different mitigation methods are needed in order to decrease erosion risks. A huge dilemma is created, as sediment is needed from this area to nourish the Northern Zone, which without it would itself begin to erode. Given this, only three options are left, either do nothing, retreat from the coast or constantly re-nourish the area with large sediment. Doing nothing is an option for some areas where there is no economic or cultural significance and erosion poses no risk to anything valuable. Objects that can be moved landward, without incurring significant losses should be moved in a managed retreat. Lastly, re-nourishment could be used sparingly in areas where objects cannot be moved or have some form of value. Re-nourishment would be the ideal method used for the entire coastline but this is not plausible due to the size of the area and the cost of re-nourishment.
