= Longshore drift =

Sediment moved by the longshore current

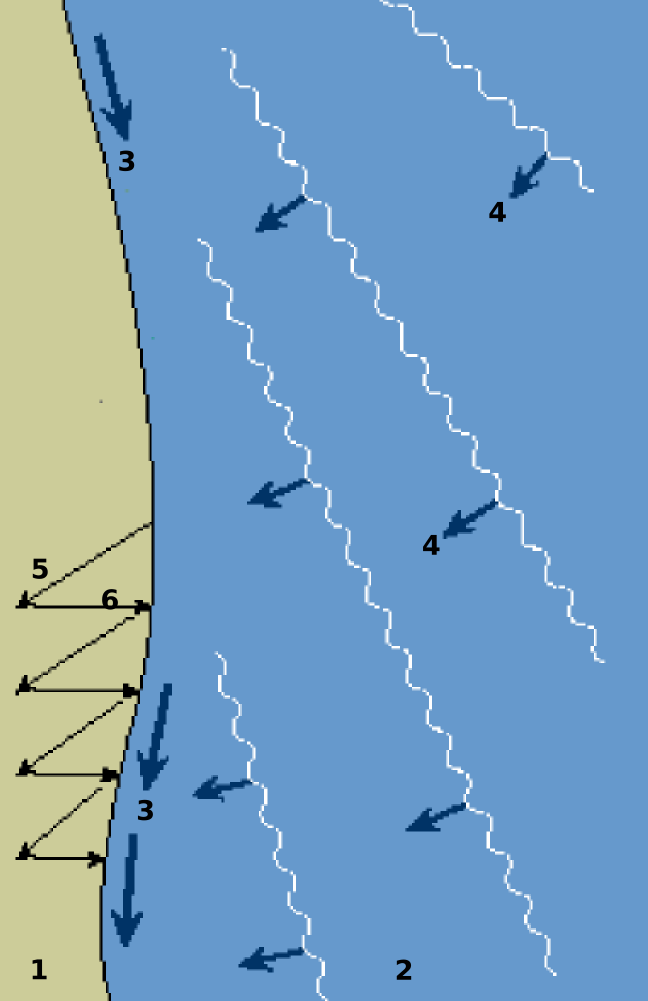
Diagram demonstrating longshore drift: 1. beach; 2. sea; 3. longshore current direction; 4. incoming waves; 5. swash; 6. backwash

Longshore drift from longshore current is a geological process that consists of the transportation of sediments (clay, silt, pebbles, sand, shingle, shells) along a coast parallel to the shoreline, which is dependent on the angle of incoming wave direction. Oblique incoming wind squeezes water along the coast, generating a water current that moves parallel to the coast. Longshore drift is simply the sediment moved by the longshore current. This current and sediment movement occurs within the surf zone. The process is also known as littoral drift.

Beach sand is also moved on such oblique wind days, due to the swash and backwash of water on the beach. Breaking surf sends water up the coast (swash) at an oblique angle and gravity then drains the water straight downslope (backwash) perpendicular to the shoreline. Thus beach sand can move downbeach in a sawtooth fashion many tens of meters (yards) per day. This process is called "beach drift", but some workers regard it as simply part of "longshore drift" because of the overall movement of sand parallel to the coast.

Longshore drift affects numerous sediment sizes as it works in slightly different ways depending on the sediment (e.g. the difference in long-shore drift of sediments from a sandy beach to that of sediments from a shingle beach). Sand is largely affected by the oscillatory force of breaking waves, the motion of sediment due to the impact of breaking waves and bed shear from long-shore current. Because shingle beaches are much steeper than sandy ones, plunging breakers are more likely to form, causing the majority of longshore transport to occur in the swash zone, due to a lack of an extended surf zone.

== Development of longshore drift theories ==
The concept of longshore drift or transportation of sediment parallel to the shore by wave action has evolved considerably with time. Early observations related to sediment displacement can be traced back to coastal communities, but the formal scientific understanding of this started crystallising in the 19th and early 20th centuries. While such early perceptions were imprecise, this evolution has encouraged a gradually more sophisticated understanding of the processes occurring at coastlines. Understanding of the coastline processes has continued to evolve through a succession of developments that began many years ago.

=== Early observations ===
Erosion of coasts and sediment transport was known in ancient times, mostly in those parts of the world where dramatic changes of shores take place. However, these early observations were largely anecdotal. Fishermen, sailors and locals would note that sand and gravel seemingly "moved" down the beaches; they didn't fully understand the mechanics, however. Because of the general scientific knowledge, this was an interesting but somewhat misunderstood phenomenon.

=== 19th century: first scientific studies ===
The systematic investigation into the coast processes, including those responsible for longshore drift, began in the mid-1800s when scientists tried to explain the processes of sediment movement along coasts. Among the first of such theories were those proposed by a French engineer, Jean-Baptiste Fourier, and an Irish geologist, Robert Mallet. They studied wave action and sediment transport; however, at that time, the term "longshore drift" was not yet coined. Instead, the principal focus was to understand the processes of waves and their impact on the resuspension and movement of sand and pebbles. The subject was of primary importance because it helped to explain the morphological features of any coast. However, while much is covered, the complete significance of such mechanisms was yet to be fully realised.

=== 20th century: longshore drift defined ===
In the early years of the 20th century, longshore drift became much more refined in its explanation through oceanographers and coastal engineers. They realised that the angle of wave approach to the coast is of paramount importance to sediment transport. This then led to the development in the concept of "longshore currents," which in turn transport sediment along the coast. These currents then became recognised as the main agent of longshore drift. An important concept which emerged during this generation was that of the "drift-aligned" beach. It explained how beaches get to form as a result of prevailing wind and wave directions and that on one side of the beach deposition takes place, while on the other side, erosion does. While the mechanics were becoming more apparent, the interrelationship of the forces in play still proved quite problematic for those trying to manage coasts.

== Overview ==
=== Longshore drift formulas ===
Numerous calculations take into consideration the factors that produce longshore drift. These formulations are:

1. Bijker formula (1967, 1971)
2. The Engelund and Hansen formula (1967)
3. The Ackers and White formula (1973)
4. The Bailard and Inman formula (1981)
5. The Van Rijn formula (1984)
6. The Watanabe formula (1992)

These formulas provide a different view of the processes that generate longshore drift. The most common factors taken into consideration in these formulas are:

- Suspended and bed load transport
- Waves, e.g., breaking and non-breaking
- The shear exerted by waves or the flow associated with waves.

=== Features of shoreline change ===
Longshore drift plays a large role in the evolution of a shoreline, as if there is a slight change of sediment supply, wind direction, or any other coastal influence longshore drift can change dramatically, affecting the formation and evolution of a beach system or profile. These changes do not occur due to one factor within the coastal system, in fact there are numerous alterations that can occur within the coastal system that may affect the distribution and impact of longshore drift. Some of these are:

1. Geological changes, e.g. erosion, backshore changes and emergence of headlands.
2. Change in hydrodynamic forces, e.g. change in wave diffraction in headland and offshore bank environments.
3. Change to hydrodynamic influences, e.g. the influence of new tidal inlets and deltas on drift.
4. Alterations of the sediment budget, e.g. switch of shorelines from drift to swash alignment, exhaustion of sediment sources.
5. The intervention of humans, e.g. cliff protection, groynes, detached breakwaters.

=== The sediment budget ===
The sediment budget takes into consideration sediment sources and sinks within a system. This sediment can come from any source with examples of sources and sinks consisting of:

- Rivers
- Lagoons
- Eroding land sources
- Artificial sources e.g. nourishment
- Artificial sinks e.g. mining/extraction
- Offshore transport
- Deposition of sediment on shore
- Gullies through the land

This sediment then enters the coastal system and is transported by longshore drift. A good example of the sediment budget and longshore drift working together in the coastal system is inlet ebb-tidal shoals, which store sand that has been transported by long-shore transport. As well as storing sand these systems may also transfer or by pass sand into other beach systems, therefore inlet ebb-tidal (shoal) systems provide good sources and sinks for the sediment budget.

Sediment deposition throughout a shoreline profile conforms to the null point hypothesis; where gravitational and hydraulic forces determine the settling velocity of grains in a seaward fining sediment distribution. Long shore occurs in a 90 to 80 degree backwash so it would be presented as a right angle with the wave line.

== Natural features ==
This section consists of features of longshore drift that occur on a coast where long-shore drift occurs uninterrupted by man-made structures.

=== Spits ===
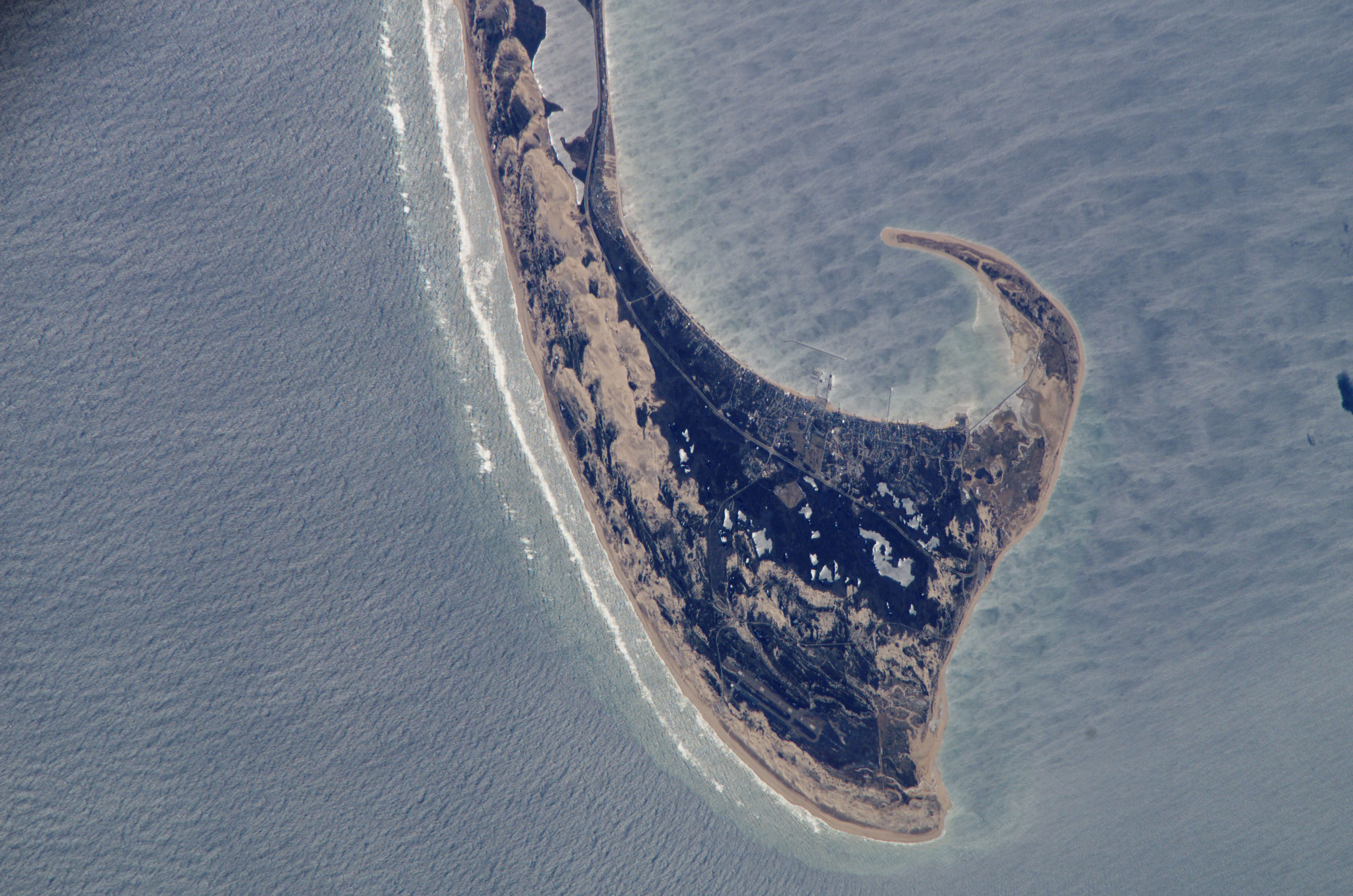
Provincetown Spit, at the northern end of Cape Cod, was formed by longshore drift after the end of the last Ice age.

Spits are formed when longshore drift travels past a point (e.g. river mouth or re-entrant) where the dominant drift direction and shoreline do not veer in the same direction. As well as dominant drift direction, spits are affected by the strength of wave-driven current, wave angle and the height of incoming waves.

Spits are landforms that have two important features, with the first feature being the region at the up-drift end or proximal end (Hart et al., 2008). The proximal end is constantly attached to land (unless breached) and may form a slight “barrier” between the sea and an estuary or lagoon (called peresyp in the Russian tradition of geomorphology). The second important spit feature is the down-drift end or distal end, which is detached from land and in some cases, may take a complex hook-shape or curve, due to the influence of varying wave directions.

As an example, the New Brighton spit in Canterbury, New Zealand, was created by longshore drift of sediment from the Waimakariri River to the north. This spit system is currently in equilibrium but undergoes alternate phases of deposition and erosion.

=== Barriers ===
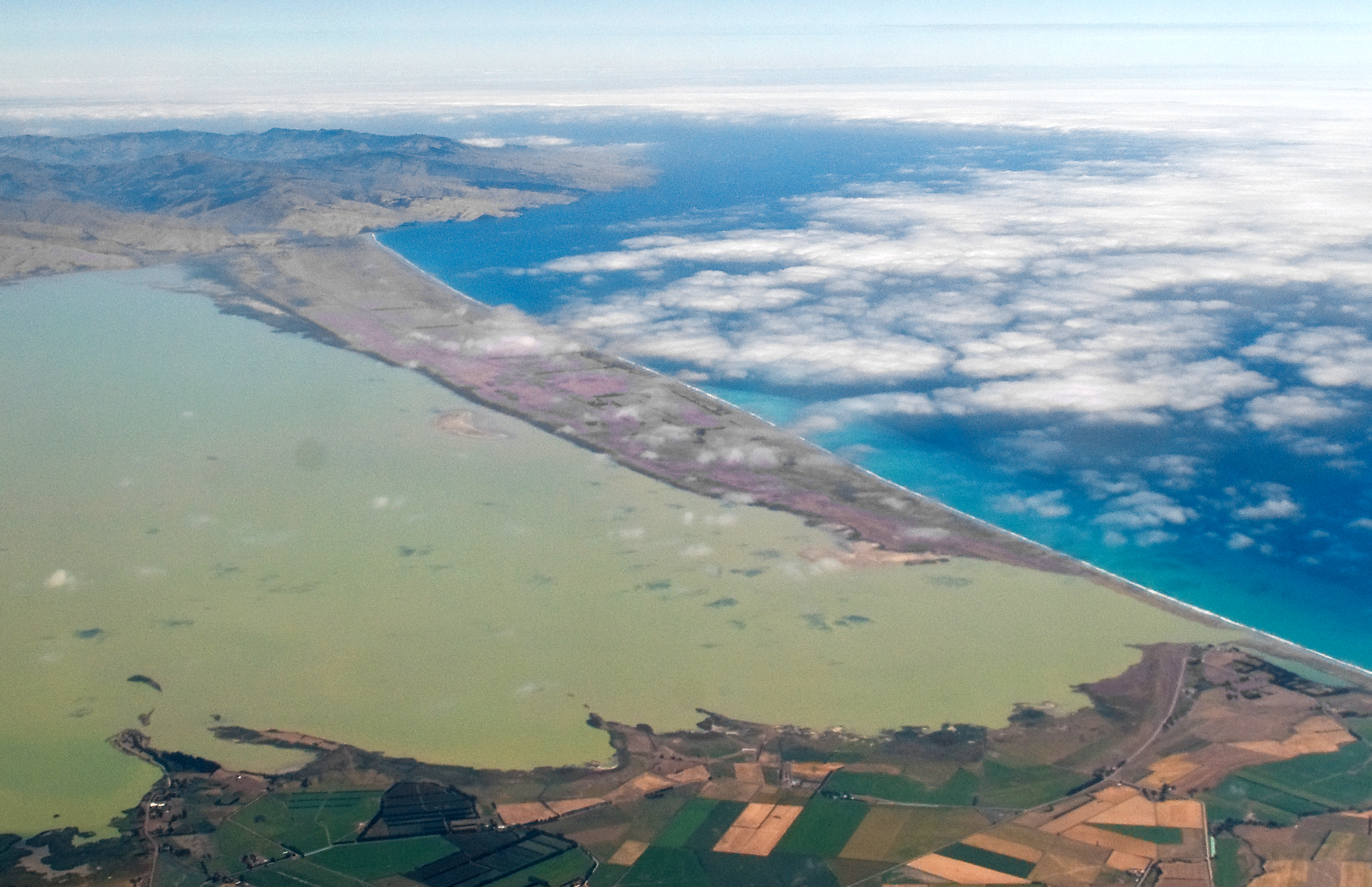
Kaitorete Spit in the Canterbury Region of New Zealand's southern island.

Barrier systems are attached to the land at both the proximal and distal ends and are generally widest at the down-drift end. These barrier systems may enclose an estuary or lagoon system, like that of Lake Ellesmere / Te Waihora enclosed by the Kaitorete Spit or hapua which form at river-coast interface such as at the mouth of the Rakaia River.

The Kaitorete Spit in Canterbury, New Zealand, is a barrier/spit system (which generally falls under the definition of barrier, as both ends of the landform are attached to land, but has been named a spit) that has existed below Banks Peninsula for the last 8,000 years. This system has undergone numerous changes and fluctuations due to avulsion of the Waimakariri River (which now flows to the north of Banks Peninsula), erosion and phases of open marine conditions. The system underwent further changes c. 500 years Before Present, when longshore drift from the eastern end of the “spit” system created the barrier, which has been retained due to ongoing longshore transport.

=== Tidal inlets ===
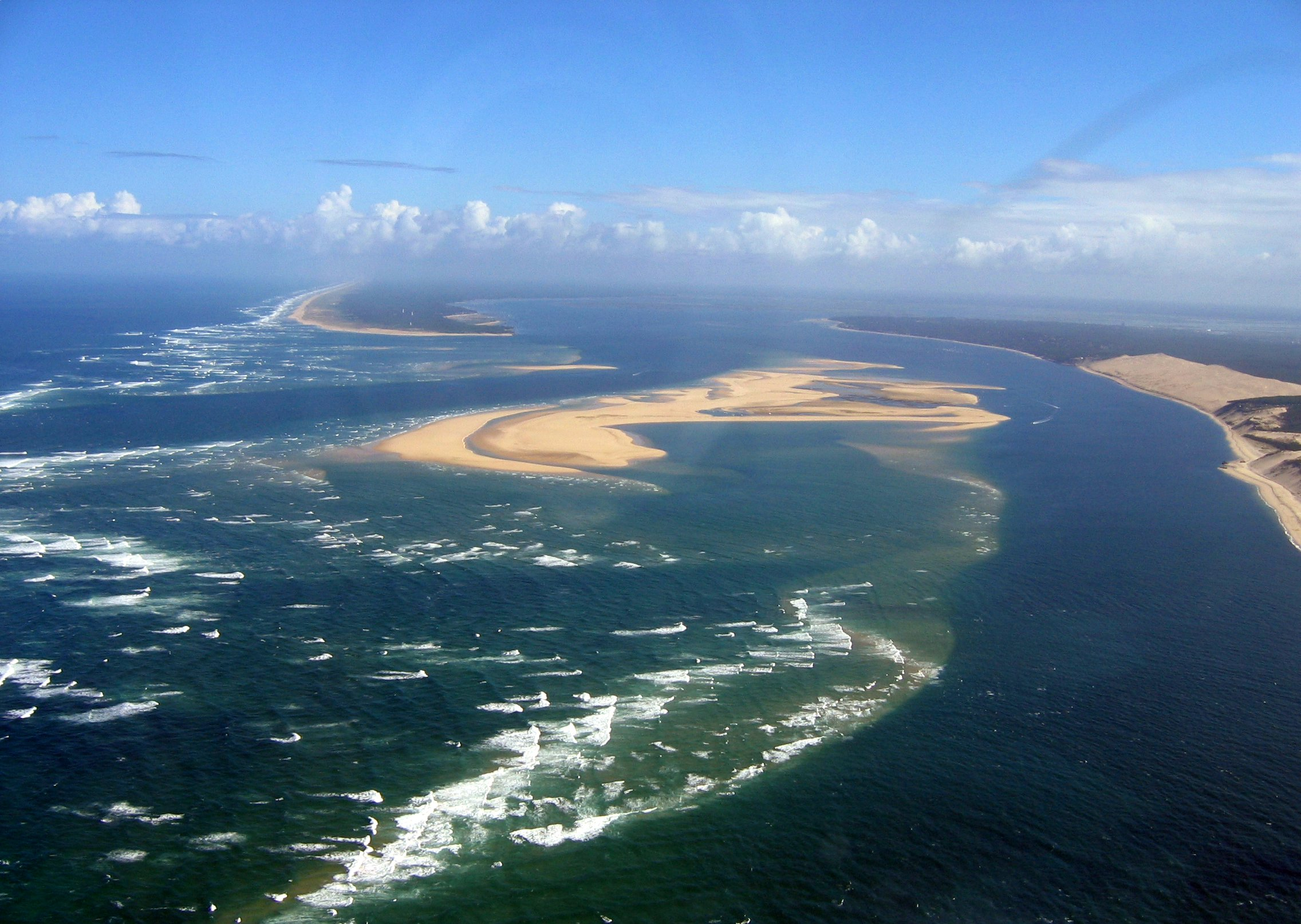
Arcachon Bay in Southwest France.

The majority of tidal inlets on longshore drift shores accumulate sediment in flood and ebb shoals. Ebb-deltas may become stunted on highly exposed shores and in smaller spaces, whereas flood deltas are likely to increase in size when space is available in a bay or lagoon system. Tidal inlets can act as sinks and sources for large amounts of material, which therefore impacts on adjacent parts of the coastline.

The structuring of tidal inlets is also important for longshore drift: if an inlet is unstructured, sediment may by-pass the inlet and form bars at the down-drift part of the coast. This may also depend on the inlet size, delta morphology, sediment rate and by-passing mechanism. Channel location variance and amount may also influence the impact of longshore drift on a tidal inlet.

Arcachon lagoon in southwest France is an example of a tidal inlet system, which provides large sources and sinks for longshore drift sediments. The impact of longshore drift sediments on this inlet system is highly influenced by the variation in the number of lagoon entrances and the location of these entrances. Any change in these factors can cause severe down-drift erosion or down-drift accretion of large swash bars.

=== Sand Islands ===
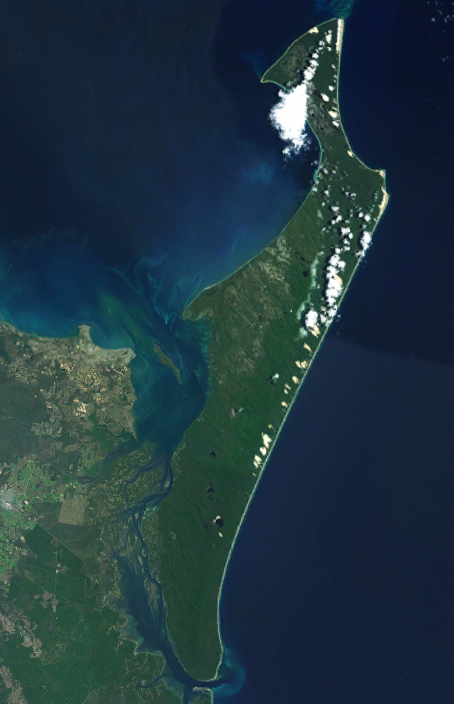
K'gari on Australia's east coast is an example of sand islands formed from longshore drift.

Where longshore drift is interrupted by other natural features, sufficient sediment deposition can occur to form long-term land structures extending off the coast. The formation process is similar to that of a Barrier island.

K'gari is the largest sand island in the world, located on Australia's east coast, and was formed from interrupted northerly longshore drift.

Over extensive periods, drifting sediment can 'leak' into deeper water, where the wind and waves driving longshore drift are weaker. This allows extensive sediment deposits to be built up off-shore, which is gradually transferred back to the coast as the sea level falls in long-term glacial cycles.

== Human influences ==
This section consists of long-shore drift features that occur unnaturally and in some cases (e.g. groynes, detached breakwaters) have been constructed to enhance the effects of longshore drift on the coastline but in other cases have a negative impact on long-shore drift (ports and harbours).

=== Groynes ===
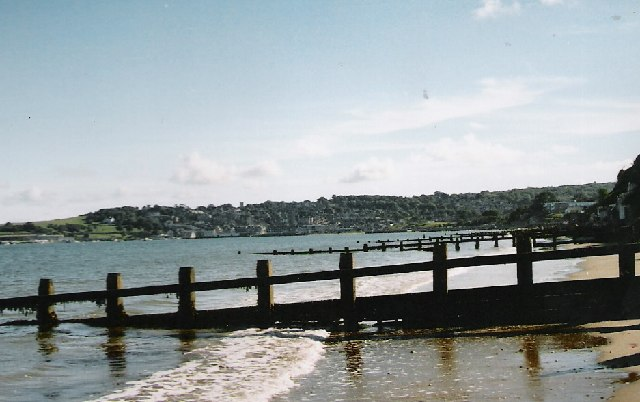
Timber groyne from Swanage Bay, UK

Groynes are shore protection structures, placed at equal intervals along the coastline in order to stop coastal erosion and generally cross the intertidal zone. Due to this, groyne structures are usually used on shores with low net and high annual longshore drift in order to retain the sediments lost in storm surges and further down the coast.

There are numerous variations to groyne designs with the three most common designs consisting of:

1. zig-zag groynes, which dissipate the destructive flows that form in wave-induced currents or in breaking waves.
2. T-head groynes, which reduce wave height through wave diffraction.
3. ‘Y’ head, a fish-tail groyne system.

=== Artificial headlands ===
Artificial headlands are also shore protection structures, which are created in order to provide a certain amount of protection to beaches or bays. Although the creation of headlands involves accretion of sediments on the up-drift side of the headland and moderate erosion of the down-drift end of the headland, this is undertaken in order to design a stabilised system that allows material to accumulate in beaches further along the shore.

Artificial headlands can occur due to natural accumulation or also through artificial nourishment.

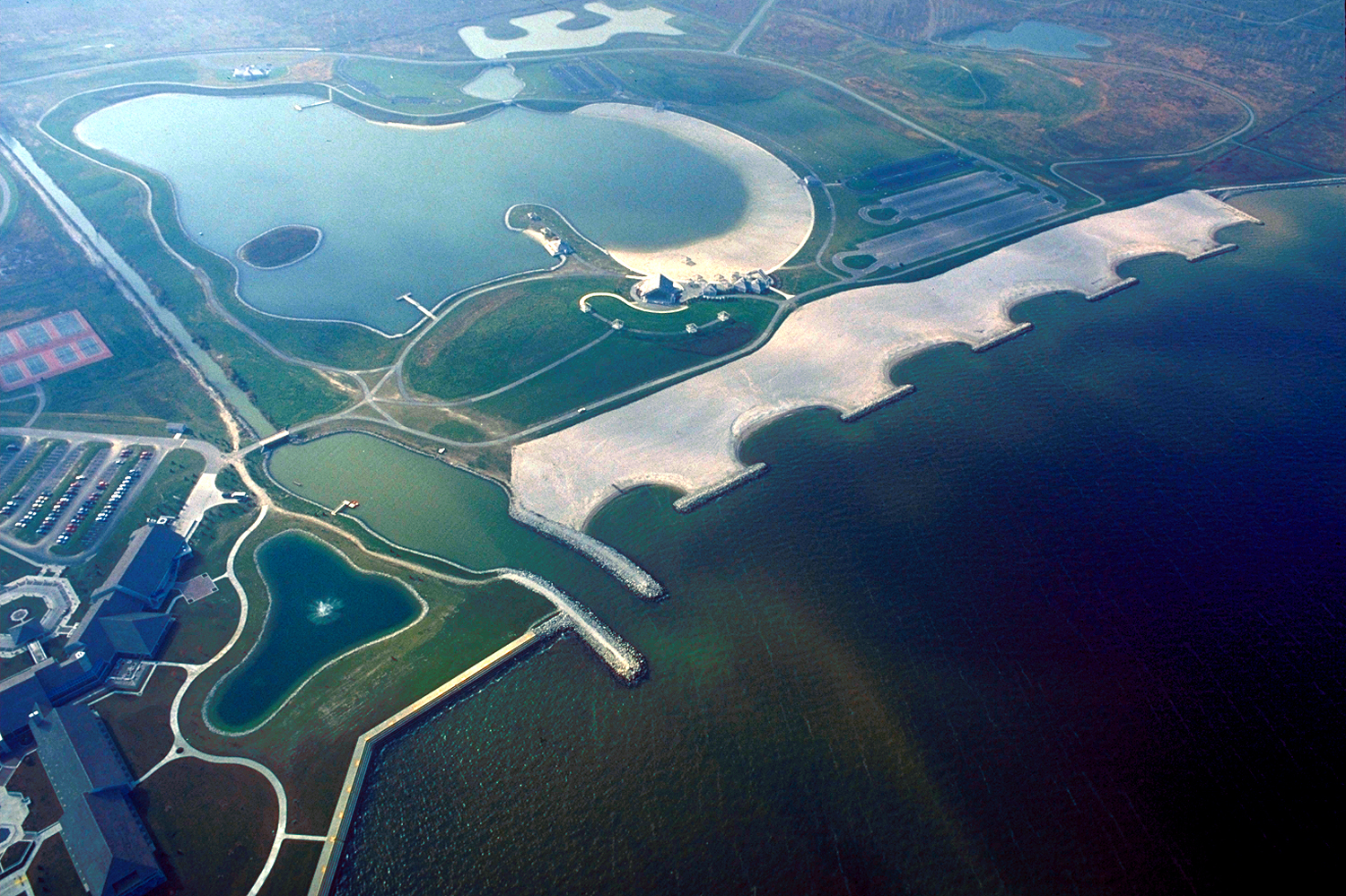
Picture showing the use of artificial headlands and detached breakwaters in a coastal system

=== Detached breakwaters ===
Detached breakwaters are shore protection structures, created to build up sandy material in order to accommodate drawdown in storm conditions. In order to accommodate drawdown in storm conditions detached breakwaters have no connection to the shoreline, which lets currents and sediment pass between the breakwater and the shore. This then forms a region of reduced wave energy, which encourages the deposition of sand on the lee side of the structure.

Detached breakwaters are generally used in the same way as groynes, to build up the volume of material between the coast and the breakwater structure in order to accommodate storm surges.

=== Ports and harbours ===
The creation of ports and harbours throughout the world can seriously impact on the natural course of longshore drift. Not only do ports and harbours pose a threat to longshore drift in the short term, they also pose a threat to shoreline evolution. The major influence, which the creation of a port or harbour can have on longshore drift, is the alteration of sedimentation patterns, which in turn may lead to accretion and/or erosion of a beach or coastal system.

As an example, the creation of a port in Timaru, New Zealand, in the late 19th century led to a significant change in the longshore drift along the South Canterbury coastline. Instead of longshore drift transporting sediment north up the coast towards the Waimataitai lagoon, the creation of the port blocked the drift of these (coarse) sediments and instead caused them to accrete to the south of the port at South beach in Timaru. The accretion of this sediment to the south, therefore meant a lack of sediment being deposited on the coast near the Waimataitai lagoon (to the north of the port), which led to the loss of the barrier enclosing the lagoon in the 1930s and then shortly after, the loss of the lagoon itself. As with the Waimataitai lagoon, the Washdyke Lagoon, which currently lies to the north of the Timaru port, is undergoing erosion and may eventually breach, causing loss of another lagoon environment.

== See also ==
- Beach evolution
- Beach erosion and accretion
- Coastal management, to prevent coastal erosion and creation of beach
- Coastal erosion
- Coastal geography
- Sand dune stabilisation
