= Hapua =

River-mouth lagoon on a mixed sand and gravel beach

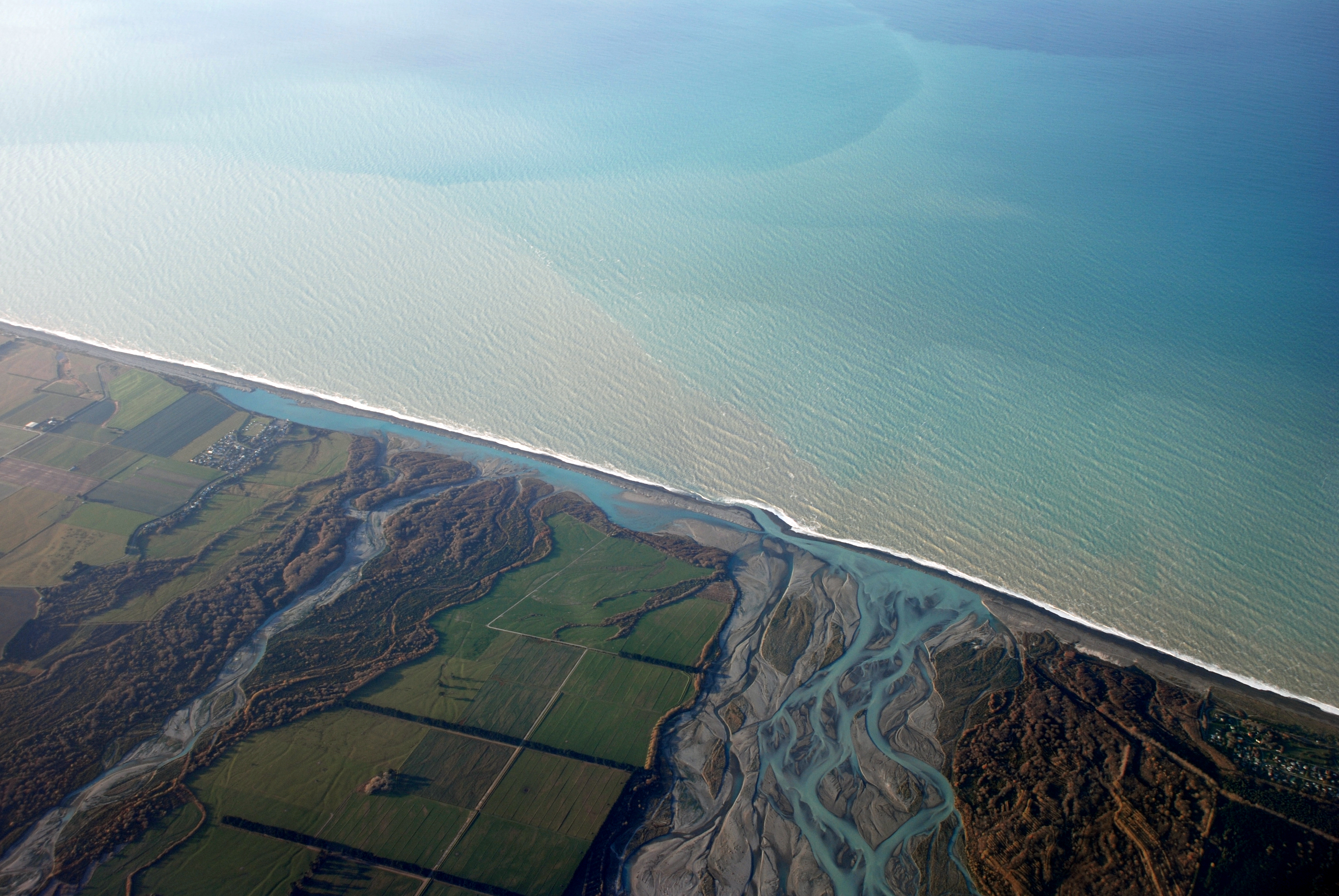
Coastal lagoon at the mouth of the Rakaia river, Canterbury Plains

A hapua is a river-mouth lagoon on a mixed sand and gravel (MSG) beach, formed at the river-coast interface where a typically braided, although sometimes meandering, river interacts with a coastal environment that is significantly affected by longshore drift. The lagoons which form on the MSG coastlines are common on the east coast of the South Island of New Zealand and have long been referred to as hapua by Māori people. This classification differentiates hapua from similar lagoons located on the New Zealand coast termed waituna.

Hapua are often located on paraglacial coastal areas where there is a low level of coastal development and minimal population density. Hapua form as the river carves out an elongated coast-parallel area, blocked from the sea by a MSG barrier which constantly alters its shape and volume due to longshore drift. Longshore drift continually extends the barrier behind which the hapua forms by transporting sediment along the coast. Hapua are defined as a narrow shore-parallel extensions of the coastal riverbed. They discharge the majority of stored water to the ocean via an ephemeral and highly mobile drainage channel or outlet. The remainder percolates through the MSG barrier due to its high levels of permeability. Hapua systems are driven by a wide range of dynamic processes that are generally classified as fluvial or marine; changes in the balance between these processes as well as the antecedent barrier conditions can cause shifts in the morphology of the hapua, in particular the barrier. New Zealand examples include the Rakaia, Ashburton and Hurunui river-mouths.

== Hapua environment ==
Hapua have been identified as establishing in the Canterbury Bight coastal region on the east coast of the South Island. They are often found in areas of coarse-grained sediment where contributing rivers have moderately steep bed gradients. MSG beaches in the Canterbury Bight region contain a wide range of sediment sizes from sand to boulders and are exposed to the high energy waves that make up an east coast swell environment. MSG beaches are reflective rather than dissipative energy zones due to their morphological characteristics. They have a steep foreshore which is known as the ‘engine room’ of the beach profile. In this zone, swash and backwash are dominating processes alongside longshore transport. MSG beaches do not have a surf zone; instead a single line of breakers is visible in all sea conditions. Hapua are associated with MSG beaches as the variation in sediment size allows for the barrier to be permeable.

The east coast of the South Island has been identified as being in a period of chronic erosion of approximately 0.5 metres per year. This erosion trend is a result of a number of factors. According to the classification scheme of Zenkovich, the rivers on the east coast can be described as ‘small’; this classification is not related to their flow rate but to the insufficient amount of sediment that they transport to the coast to nourish it. The sediment provided is not adequate to nourish the coast against its typical high energy waves and strong longshore drift. These two processes constantly remove sediment depositing it either offshore or further up drift. As the coastline becomes eroded the hapua have been 'rolling back' by eroding the backshore to move landwards.

Hapua or river-mouth lagoons form in micro-tidal environments. A micro-tidal environment is where the tidal range (distance between low tide and high tide) is less than two metres. Tidal currents in a micro-tidal zone are less than those found on meso-tidal (two – four metres) and macro-tidal (greater than four metres) coastlines. Hapua form in this type of tidal environment as the tidal currents are unable to compete with the powerful freshwater flows of the rivers therefore there is no negligible tidal penetration to the lagoon. A fourth element of the environment in which hapua form is the strong longshore drift component. Longshore or littoral drift is the transportation of sediments along the coast at an angle to the shoreline. In the Canterbury Bight coastal area; the dominant swell direction is northwards from the Southern Ocean. Therefore, the principal movement of sediment via longshore drift is north towards Banks Peninsula. Hapua are located in areas dominated by longshore drift; because it aids the formation of the barrier behind which the hapua is sited.

A hapua also requires sediment to form the lagoon barrier. Sediment which nourishes the east coast of New Zealand can be sourced from three different areas. Material from the highly erodible Southern Alps is removed via weathering; then carried across the Canterbury Plains by various braided rivers to the east coast beaches. The second source of sediment is the high cliffs which are located in the hinterland of lagoons. These can be eroded during the occurrence of high river flow or sea storm events. Beaches further south provide nourishment to the northern coast via longshore transport.

== Hapua characteristics ==
Hapua have a number of characteristics which includes shifts between a variety of morphodynamic states due to changes in the balance between marine and fluvial processes as well as the antecedent barrier conditions. The MSG barrier constantly changes size and shape as a result of the longshore drift. Water stored in the hapua drains to the coast predominantly though an outlet; although it can also seep through the barrier depending on the permeability of the material.

Changes in the level of the lagoon water do not occur as a result of saltwater or tidal intrusion. Water in a hapua is predominantly freshwater originating from the associated river. Hapua are non-estuarine, there is no tidal inflow however the tide does have an effect on the level of water in the lagoon. As the tide reaches its peak, the lagoon water has a much smaller amount of barrier to permeate through so the lagoon level rises. This is related to a physics theory known as hydraulic head. The lagoon level has a similar sinusoidal wave shape as the tide but reaches its peak slightly later. In general, any saltwater intrusion into the hapua will only occur during a storm via wave overtopping or sea spray.

Hapua can act as both a source and sink of sediment. The majority of sediment in the hapua is fluvial sourced. During medium to low river flows, coarser sediment generally collects in the hapua; while some of the finer sediment can be transported through the outlet to the coast. During flood events the hapua is 'flushed out' with larger amounts of sediment transferred through the outlet. This sediment can be deposited offshore or downdrift of the hapua replenishing the undernourished beach. If a large amount of material is released to the coast at one time it can be identified as a 'slug'. These can often be visible from aerial photographs.

Antecedent barrier conditions combined with changes in the balance between marine and fluvial processes results in shifts between a variety of morphological states in a hapua or river-mouth lagoon on a MSG beach. Marine processes includes the direction of wave approach, wave height and the coincidence of storm waves with high tides. Marine processes tend to dominate the majority of morphodynamic conditions until there is a large enough flood event in the associated river to breach the barrier. The level and frequency of base or flood flows are attributed to fluvial processes. Antecedent barrier conditions are the permeability, volume and height of the barrier as well as the width and presence of previous outlet channels. During low to medium river flows, the outlet from the lagoon to the sea becomes offset in the direction of longshore drift. Outlet efficiency tends to decrease the further away from the main river-mouth the outlet is. A decrease in efficiency can cause the outlet to become choked with sediment and the hapua to close temporarily. The potential for closure varies between different hapua depending on whether marine or fluvial processes are the bigger driver in the event. A high flow event; such as a fresh or flood can breach the barrier directly opposite the main river channel. This causes an immediate decrease in the water level of the hapua; as well as transporting previously deposited sediments into the ocean. Flood events are important for eroding lagoon back shores; this is a behaviour which allows hapua to retreat landward and thus remain coastal landforms even with coastal transgression and sea level rise. During high flow events there is also the possibility for secondary breaches of the barrier or lagoon truncation to occur.

Storm events also have the ability to close hapua outlets as waves overtop the barrier depositing sediment and choking the scoured channel. The resultant swift increase in lagoon water level causes a new outlet to be breached rapidly due to the large hydraulic head that forms between the lagoon and sea water levels. Storm breaching is believed to be an important but unpredictable control on the duration of closures at low to moderate river flow levels in smaller hapua.

Hapua are extremely important for a number of reasons. They provide a link between the river and sea for migrating fish as well as a corridor for migratory birds. To lose this link via closure of the hapua outlet could result in losing entire generations of specific species as they may need to migrate to the ocean or the river as a vital part of their lifecycle. River-mouth lagoons such as hapua were also used a source for mahinga kai (food gathering) by the Māori people. However, this is no longer the case due to catchment degradation which has resulted in lagoon deterioration. River-mouth lagoons on MSG beaches are not well explained in international literature.

== Hapua case study ==
The hapua located at the mouth of the Rakaia River stretches approximately three kilometres north from where the river-mouth reaches the coast. The average width of the hapua between 1952 and 2004 was approximately 50 metres; whilst the surface area has stabilised at approximately 600,000 square metres since 1966. The coastal hinterland is composed of erodible cliffs and a low-lying area commonly known as the Rakaia Huts. This area has changed notably since European Settlement; with the drainage of ecologically significant wetlands and development of the small bach community.

The Rakaia River begins in the Southern Alps, providing approximately 4.2 Mt per year of sediment to the east coast. It is a braided river with a catchment area of 3105 kilometres squared and a mean flow of 221 cubic metres per second. The mouth of the Rakaia River reaches the coast south-west of Banks Peninsula. As the river reaches the coast it diverges into two channels; with the main channel flowing to the south of the island. As the hapua is located in the Canterbury Bight it is in a state of constant morphological change due to the prevailing southerly sea swells and resultant northwards longshore drift.
