= Irwell River (New Zealand) =

Coordinates: 43°45′S 172°23′E

Location
- Country: New Zealand

Physical characteristics
- Mouth
  - location: Lake Ellesmere / Te Waihora
- Length: 7 km (4.3 mi)

The Irwell River is a river of the Canterbury Plains, on New Zealand's South Island. A short river, it rises to the southeast of Dunsandel, flowing southeast to enter the broad, shallow Lake Ellesmere / Te Waihora.

== See also ==
- List of rivers of New Zealand
