= Lake Ellesmere / Te Waihora =

Lagoon in New Zealand

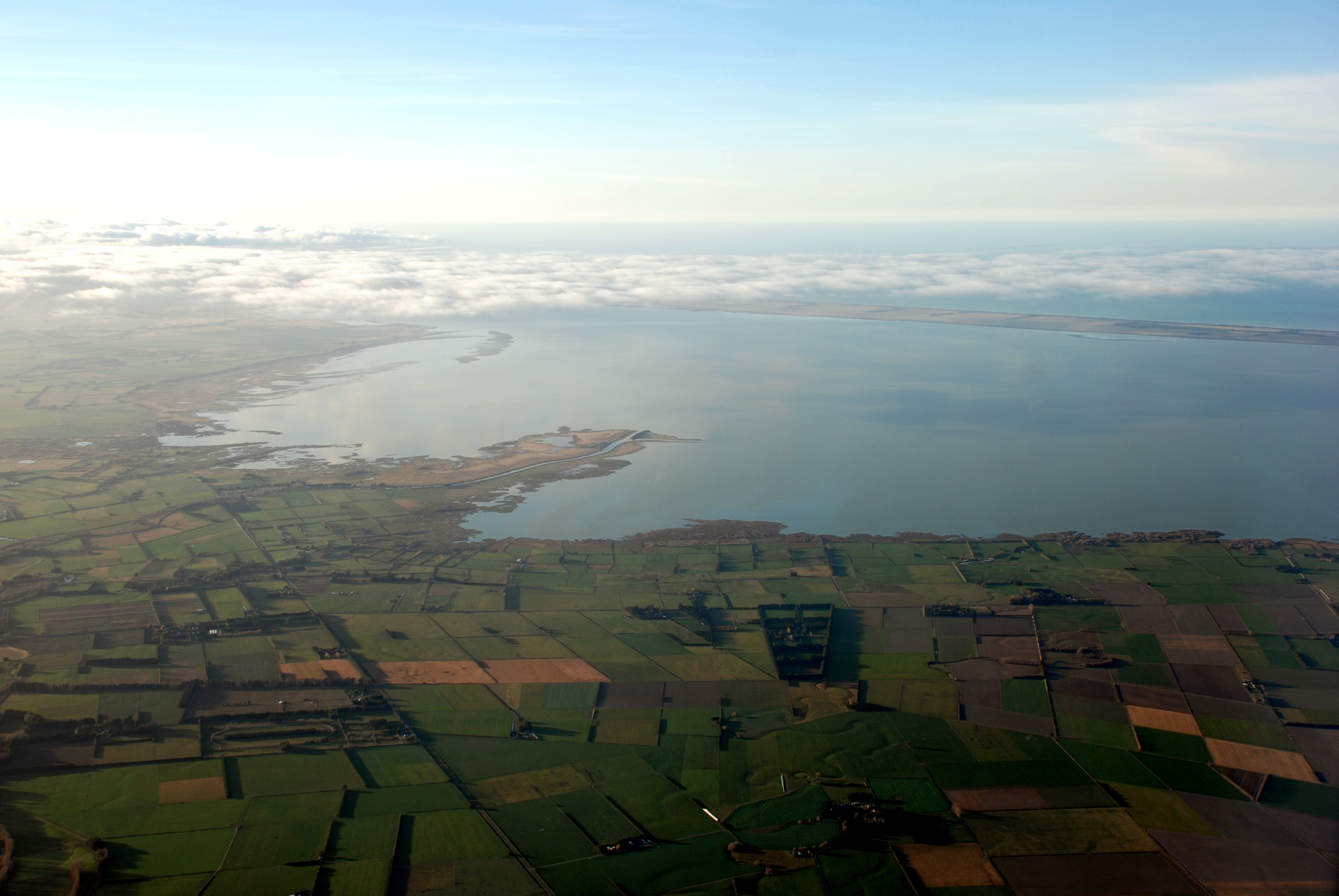
- Aerial view of Lake Ellesmere / Te Waihora

- Location within South Island
- Interactive map of Lake Ellesmere / Te Waihora
- Location: Selwyn District and Christchurch City, Canterbury region, South Island
- Coordinates: 43°48′S 172°25′E
- Type: Brackish lagoon
- Primary inflows: Selwyn River / Waikirikiri
- Basin countries: New Zealand
- Max. length: 30.5 km (19.0 mi)
- Max. width: 14.5 km (9.0 mi)
- Surface area: 197.81 km^{2} (76.37 sq mi)
- Max. depth: 2.1 m (6 ft 11 in)
- Surface elevation: 2 m (6 ft 7 in)

Lake Ellesmere / Te Waihora is a shallow coastal lagoon or waituna, in the Canterbury region of the South Island of New Zealand. It is directly to the west of Banks Peninsula, separated from the Pacific Ocean by the long, narrow, sandy Kaitorete Spit. It lies partially in extreme southeastern Selwyn District and partially in the city of Christchurch's district. The lake holds high historical and cultural significance to the indigenous Māori population and the traditional Māori name Te Waihora means spreading waters. It has officially had a dual English/Māori name since at least 1938.

== Geography and hydrology ==
Lake Ellesmere / Te Waihora is a brackish bar-type water body, commonly called a lake or lagoon. It covers an area of 198 square kilometres (76 sq mi), and is New Zealand's fifth largest lake.

== Nature ==
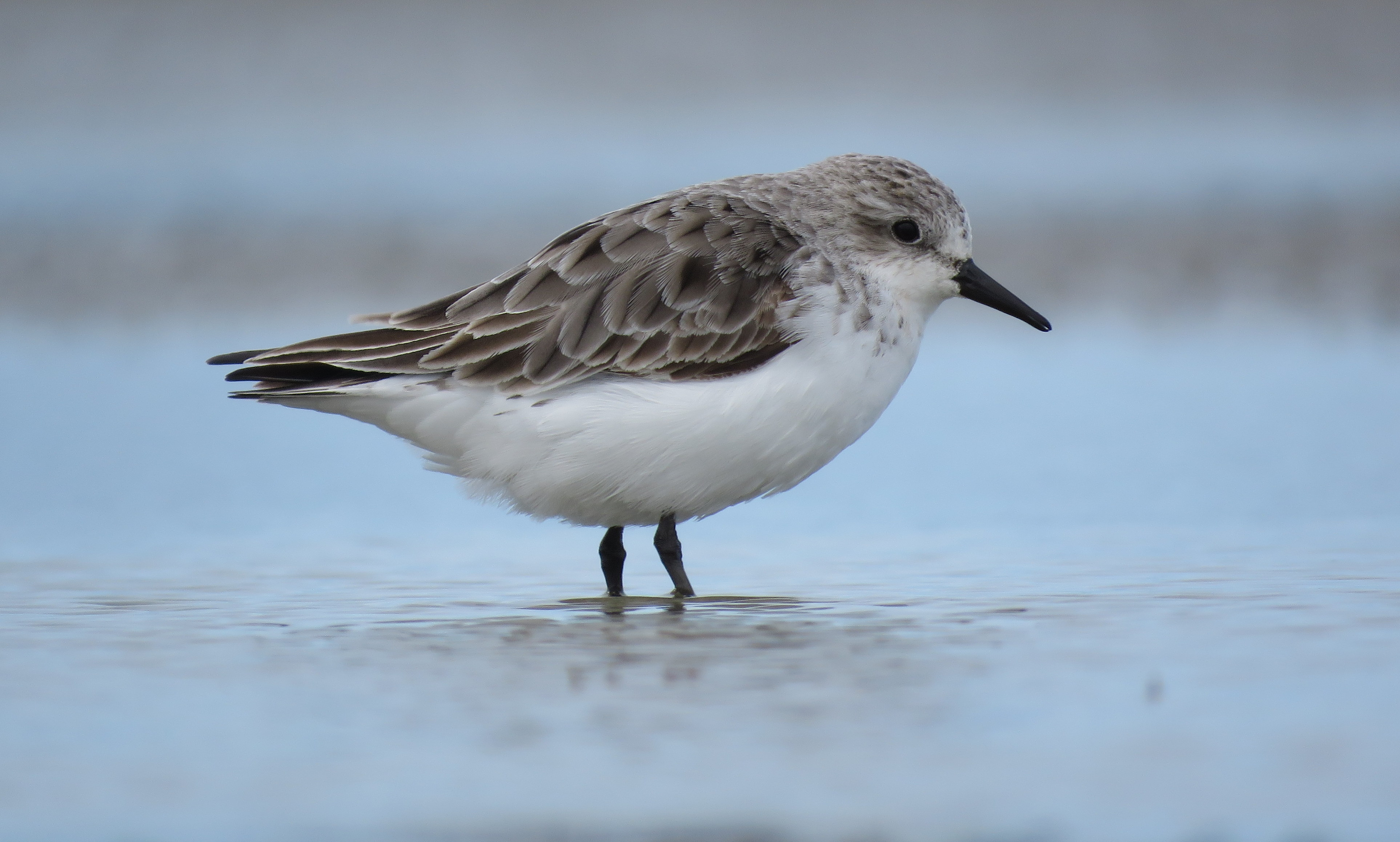
Red-Necked Stint (Calidris ruficollis) at mudflat near the southern tip of Kaitorete Spit. This small wading bird is a regular summer migrant to New Zealand, and can regularly be seen on Lake Ellesmere's mudflats.

Southern elephant seals have been observed here, spending short periods in the lake. Basking sharks have occasionally entered the lake.

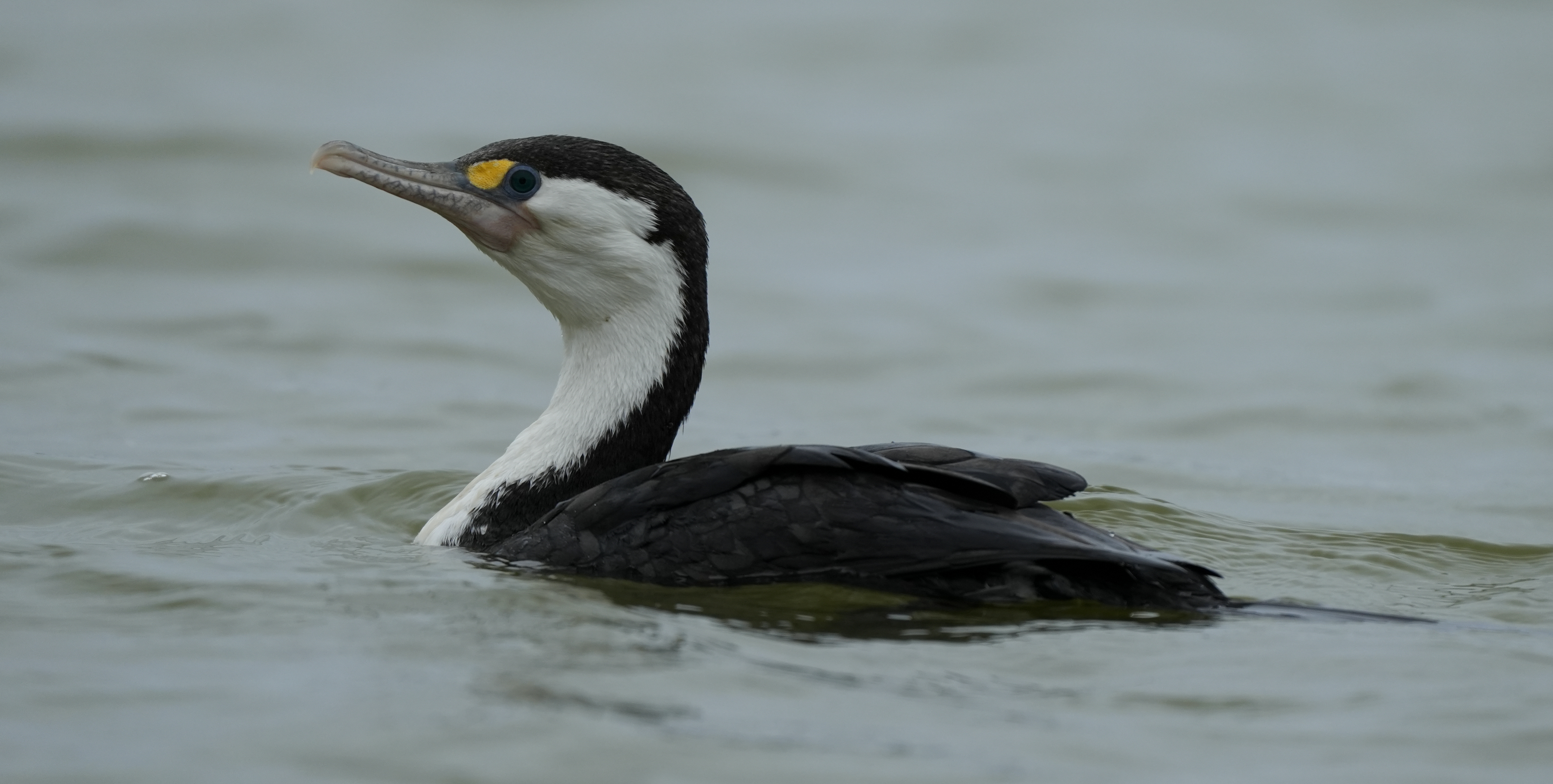
Pied Shag / Kāruhiruhi (Phalacrocorax varius) swimming on water's surface at the small settlement of Fishermans Point near the southern end of the lake. Pied Shags are a regularly seen resident on and around the lake.

Lake Ellesmere is also home to a wide variety of birds, with over 200 species (if extinct species are also included) having been recorded at the lake and its direct surroundings. Lake Ellesmere has become a well-known bird watching location for certain rare species, such as the Australasian Bittern, Marsh Crake and Kotuku. Wading birds of various species frequent the lake and its surroundings, including native species such as the Pied Stilt, South Island Pied Oystercatcher, Banded Dotterel and Wrybill, and also Arctic migrants such as the Bar-Tailed Godwit, Red-Necked Stint, Sharp-Tailed Sandpiper and Pacific Golden Plover, among others. Waterfowl are also prominent residents on the lake, with native species including Paradise Shelduck, New Zealand Scaup, Australasian Shoveler and Grey Teal. Grey Teal are actually considered one of the most abundant bird species on the lake. Introduced waterfowl species include Mallards, feral Greylag Geese, Canada Geese, Mute Swan and Black Swan, with the latter being another one of the lake's most abundant birds. Cormorants such as the Black Shag, Pied Shag and Little Shag are commonly seen in the lake. Black-Backed Gull, Red-Billed Gull and Black-Billed Gull can be seen in and around the lake, as can some tern species such as the Caspian Tern, White-Fronted Tern and Black-Fronted Tern, and the rarer White-Winged Tern. A wide variety of other birds can also be seen in and around the lake, including White-Faced Heron, Eastern Cattle Egret, Royal Spoonbill, Australasian Harrier, Pukeko, Spotless Crake, Sacred Kingfisher, as well as various introduced Galliforms and both native and introduced Passerines. A variety of rare vagrant birds have also appeared at Lake Ellesmere over the years, with some of these including Little Stint, Long-Toed Stint, Stilt Sandpiper, and Cox's Sandpiper. Australian Terns are also rare visitors to the lake.

== History ==
The lake has been up to twice its present depth and area in the past, and it has progressed through various stages as it has developed into the current brackish bar-type lagoon. In chronological order these stages began with the lake as part of Canterbury plains, which were then flooded, forming a bay, then an estuary and finally a lake.

== Cultural significance ==
Lake Ellesmere / Te Waihora has been an important mahinga kai (site of traditional significance for food and other natural resources) for Māori since ancient times and remains central to the lives of many Māori who now live in the area.

The traditional name for the lake was Te Kete Ika o Rākaihautū meaning "the fish basket of Rākaihautū". The food sources of Lake Ellesmere / Te Waihora were once abundant and included tuna (eels), pātiki (flounder) inanga (whitebait), koura (freshwater crayfish) and aua (mullet). The lake was a famed mahinga manu wai māori (place for taking waterfowl), with many species of wetland birds. The lake was surrounded by raupo (Typha orientalis) and harakeke or New Zealand flax (Phormium tenax), and pīngao (Ficinia spiralis) grew on Kaitorete Spit; all three were harvested for weaving, and black mud (paruparu) from the lake was used for dyeing fibres.

The pā Taumutu, or Te Pā o te Ikamutu, was built at the southwestern corner of Te Waihora, close to the outlet to the sea, sited on a tongue of land surrounded by defensive swamplands. The pā was strategically positioned for access to the lake, to Banks Peninsula to the north, the pā at Kaiapoi and Poranui, and for coastal canoes from Te Maru (Timaru) to the south. The control of the lake's level was retained at an optimum water level for the birdlife that lived there and provided kai (food) for many people. The lake was only drained when its level exceeded the normal maximum. Kōrari (harakeke stalks) were dragged across the sand to make the initial opening of the water to the sea. This carefully monitored drainage of the lake took place for several hundred years, consistently maintaining Lake Ellesmere / Te Waihora's abundant supply of kai.

Europeans settled at Fishermans Point at Taumutu and set up a commercial eel fishery, with up to 250 people living in the settlement. With no management the uncontrolled fishery had significantly depleted the lake's eels by the end of the 19th century. Europeans also wanted the level of the lake permanently lowered to expose more farmland around the lake shore, and opened Te Waihora to the sea in the 1860s. Local Māori protested, and in 1865 wrote to James FitzGerald, Superintendent of Canterbury Province:

Friend Mr FitzGerald…now the water is being let off by the Pakehas, that is to say by the Government, so as that land might be made a sheep station by the Europeans, and now there is very little (or no) water, it has to be left for two or three years before there is sufficient water to over-flow so as to enable us to catch eels; but no, it is being drained off by the Government so as to be a source of emolument for them.

Today Lake Ellesmere / Te Waihora is periodically lowered by bulldozers to prevent it encroaching on agricultural land. The bulldozers dig a dry channel to the sea over several days, leaving a small dam which is then breached; the lake then lowers over a week or two until the entrance is blocked by waves and storms again. While the lake remains a mahinga kai, its vitality and fisheries have been reduced by regular lake lowering. Under the Ngāi Tahu Claims Settlement 1998, ownership of the lake bed of Lake Ellesmere / Te Waihora was returned to Te Rūnanga O Ngāi Tahu, who are now able to reassert their rangatiratanga (ownership) over the lake through direct control of its management. However this has not yet resolved the dispute over the permanently-lowered lake level.

=== Recreation ===
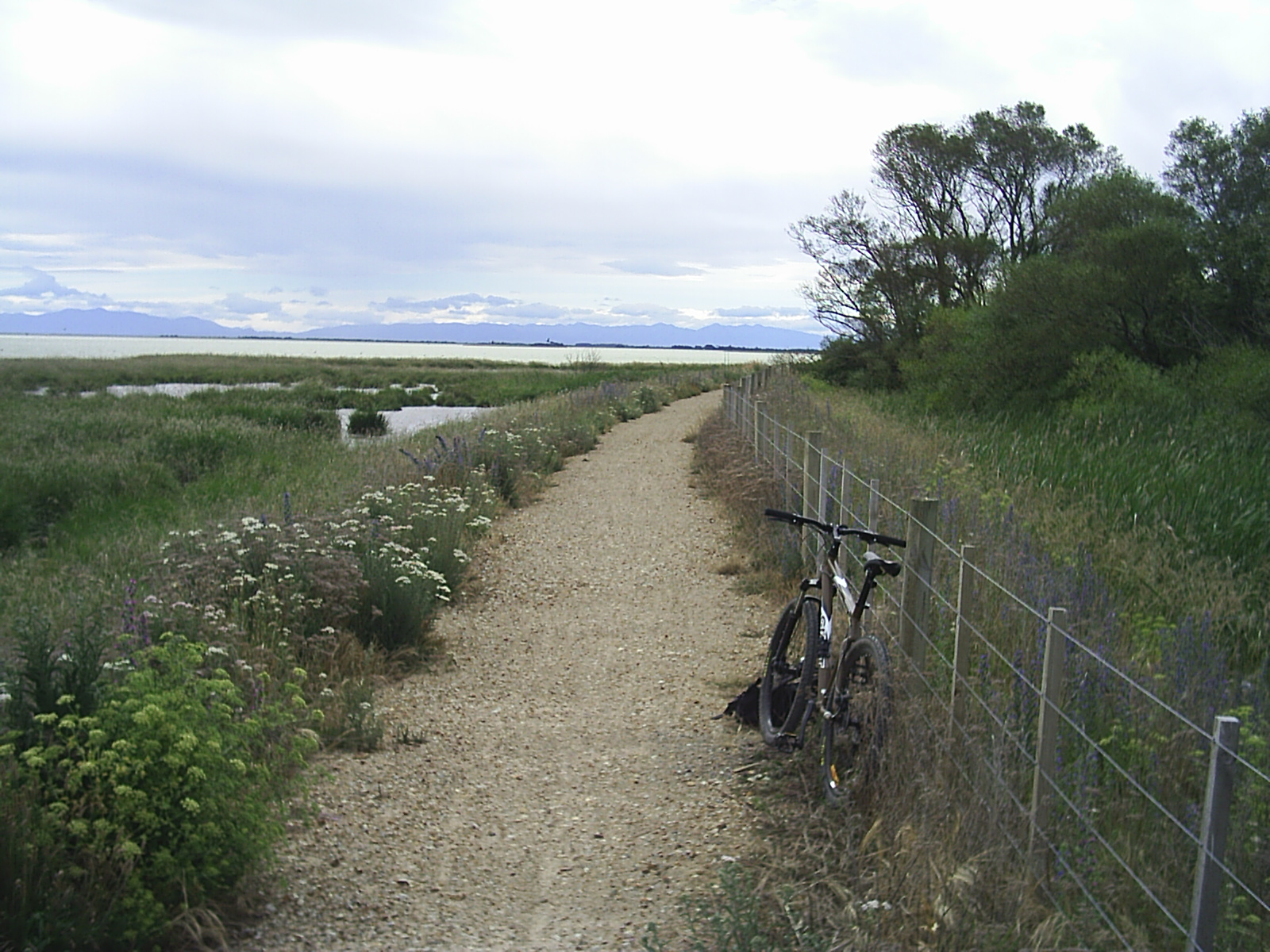
Little River Rail Trail near Lake Ellesmere / Te Waihora

As well as holding high cultural significance to the indigenous population, Lake Ellesmere / Te Waihora is also rated as a nationally significant site for recreation. The lake is currently used for a wide range of water and land based activities.

Many of these activities are reliant on a healthy natural ecosystem, especially fish and wildlife habitat, and a decrease in the number of people participating in trout fishing and other activities has been recorded since 1996.

== State of the lake and future management ==
In 2007 an assessment of the cultural health of Lake Ellesmere / Te Waihora was undertaken as a combined effort by Ngai Tahu and the National Institute of Water and Atmospheric Research (NIWA). In a 2010 report on lake water quality, Lake Ellesmere / Te Waihora was deemed the second most polluted lake in New Zealand in terms of nutrient content and algal growth. Algal blooms are a regular summer occurrence and toxic algae bloomed in the lake in 2009.

Results for E. coli levels are also poor with 42% of sites associated with the lake failing national recreational guide standards for water quality. No sites achieved the shellfish/food gathering standard or were fit for drinking.

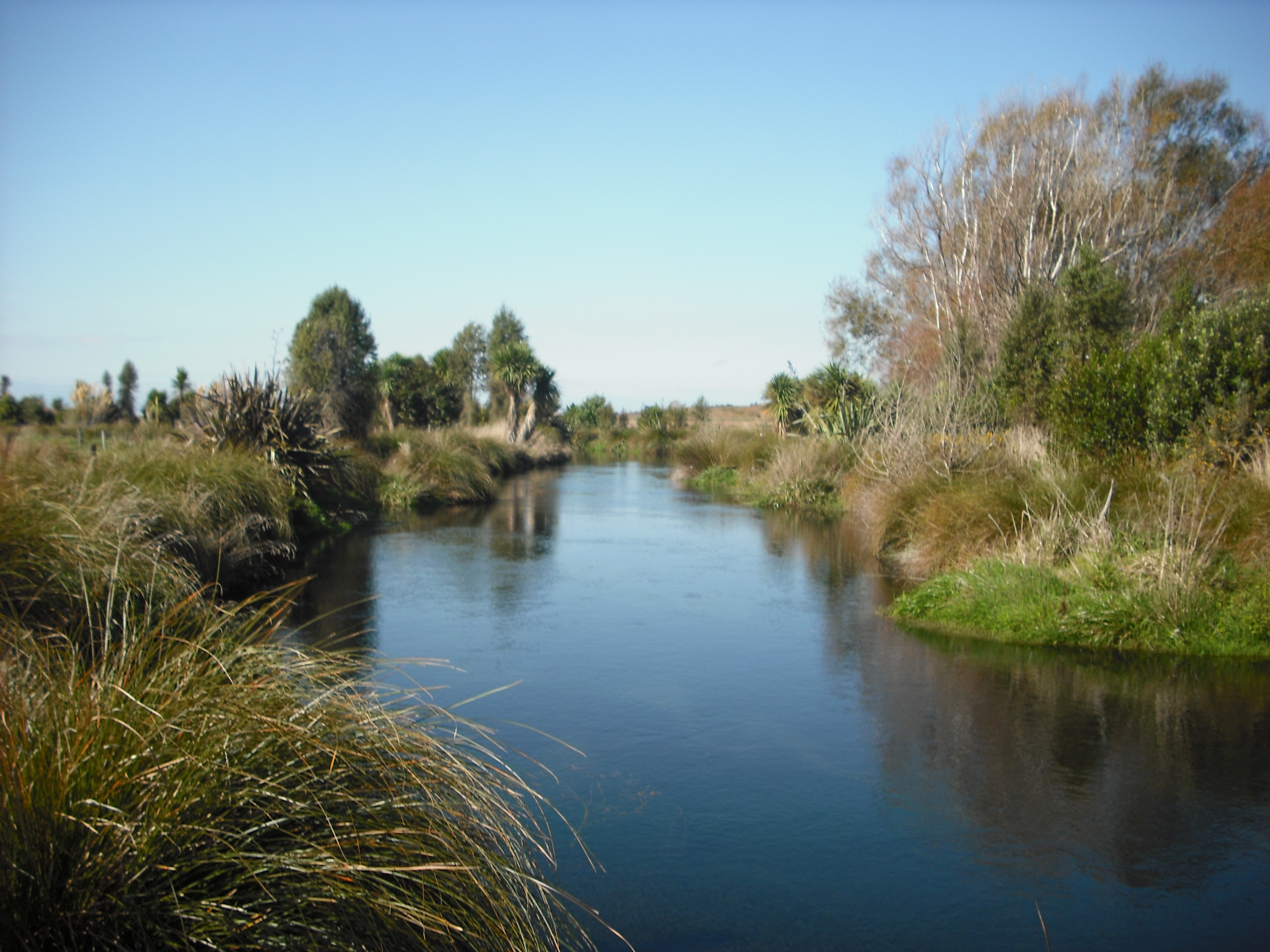
Riparian protection zone on the banks of Hart Creek, in the Selwyn River Catchment, Canterbury

== See also ==
- Lakes of New Zealand
