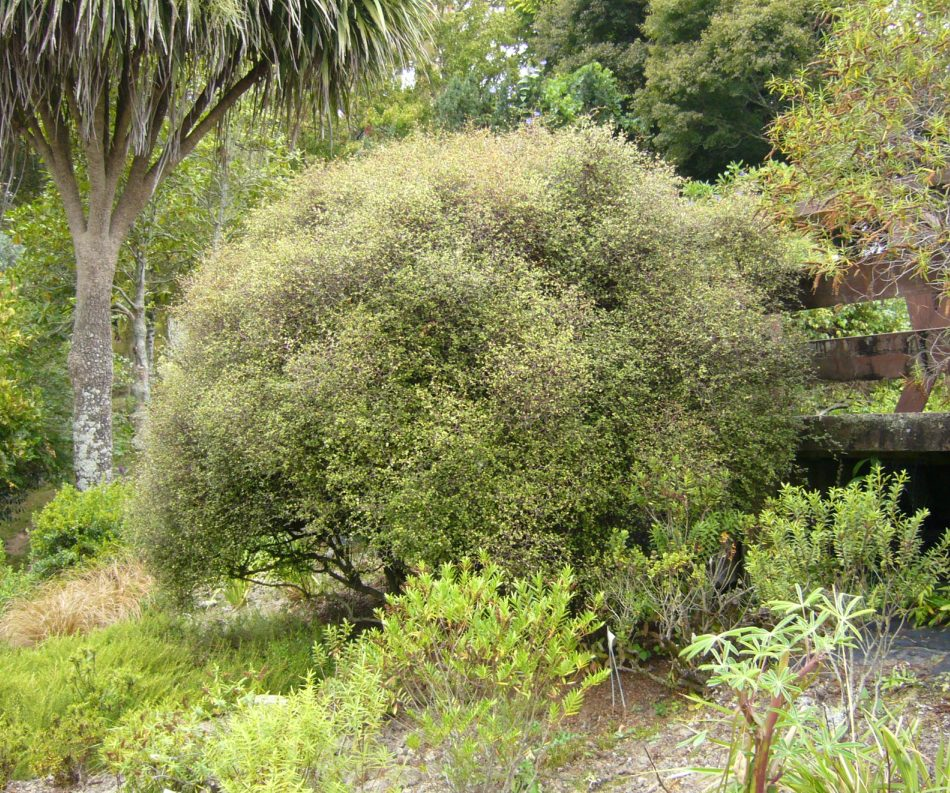
- Shrubby tororaro at Hackfalls Arboretum, Tiniroto, New Zealand

Conservation status
- Nationally Endangered (NZ TCS)

Scientific classification
- Kingdom: Plantae
- Clade: Tracheophytes
- Clade: Angiosperms
- Clade: Eudicots
- Order: Caryophyllales
- Family: Polygonaceae
- Genus: Muehlenbeckia
- Species: M. astonii

Binomial name
- Muehlenbeckia astonii Petrie

= Muehlenbeckia astonii =

Species of shrub endemic to New Zealand

Muehlenbeckia astonii, commonly known as the shrubby tororaro, is an endemic New Zealand shrub in the family Polygonaceae. It is found in both the North and the South Islands and has distinctive small heart-shaped deciduous leaves amidst a tangle of wiry interlocking branches. Although common in cultivation around the world, it is extremely rare and threatened in the wild. Its conservation status is "Nationally Endangered".

== Description ==
Shrubby tororaro has very small leaves (only 2–15 millimetres (0.079–0.591 in) wide) on a 3–10 millimetres (0.12–0.39 in) brown stalk, growing in clusters of two to three (sometimes five), or alternating along the longer branchlets. The leaves are usually dented at the tip and heart-shaped. They are bright green above and pale below.

Unlike most New Zealand plants M. astonii is leafless in winter. It grows from a distinct trunk, and has many fine reddish brown to orange flexible branches that zigzag around one another to form a dense, interwoven ball, generally 2–3 metres (6 ft 7 in – 9 ft 10 in) around, and sometimes 4 × 4 metres. Older plants have stems like canes growing from the interior. Plants have been recorded living for over 80 years.

Its flowers, appearing December to January, are tiny and grow in clusters of two to four, less than 10 millimetres (0.39 in) in diameter, and are greenish to white or pinkish white. The plant is gynodioecious: individuals have either female flowers or what have been described as 'inconstant male' hermaphrodites. 'Inconstant males' can self-fertilise, but their seeds have less than 5% viability. Isolated female plants produce infertile fruits, or hybridise with other Muehlenbeckia species nearby.

Fruits appear in October to June. The seed is a dark three-sided nut, about 2–2.5 millimetres (0.079–0.098 in) long, dull not glossy (which distinguishes it from the scrub pōhuehue or torararo, M. complexa). The seed is surrounded by the remnants of the tepals, which swell into a white fruit in just 10–15 days. These fruits are sugary and edible, eaten by birds and lizards (which disperse the seeds), and by mice (which pulverise and kill the seed). Seeds can persist for up to four years in the soil. The plant is an important host for several endemic moth species, and in some cases their sole host.

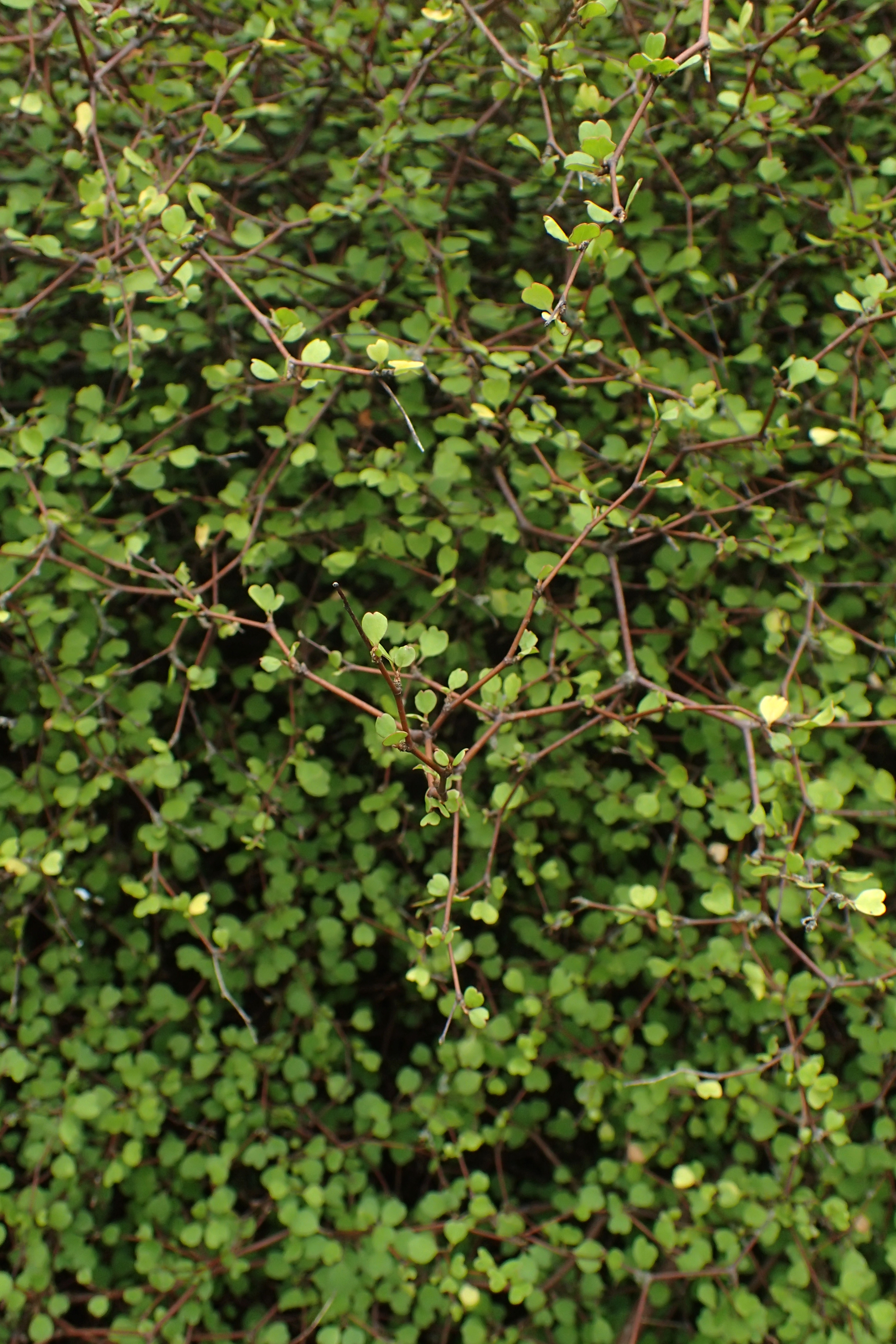
M. astonii's distinctive interlaced branches and heart-shaped leaves

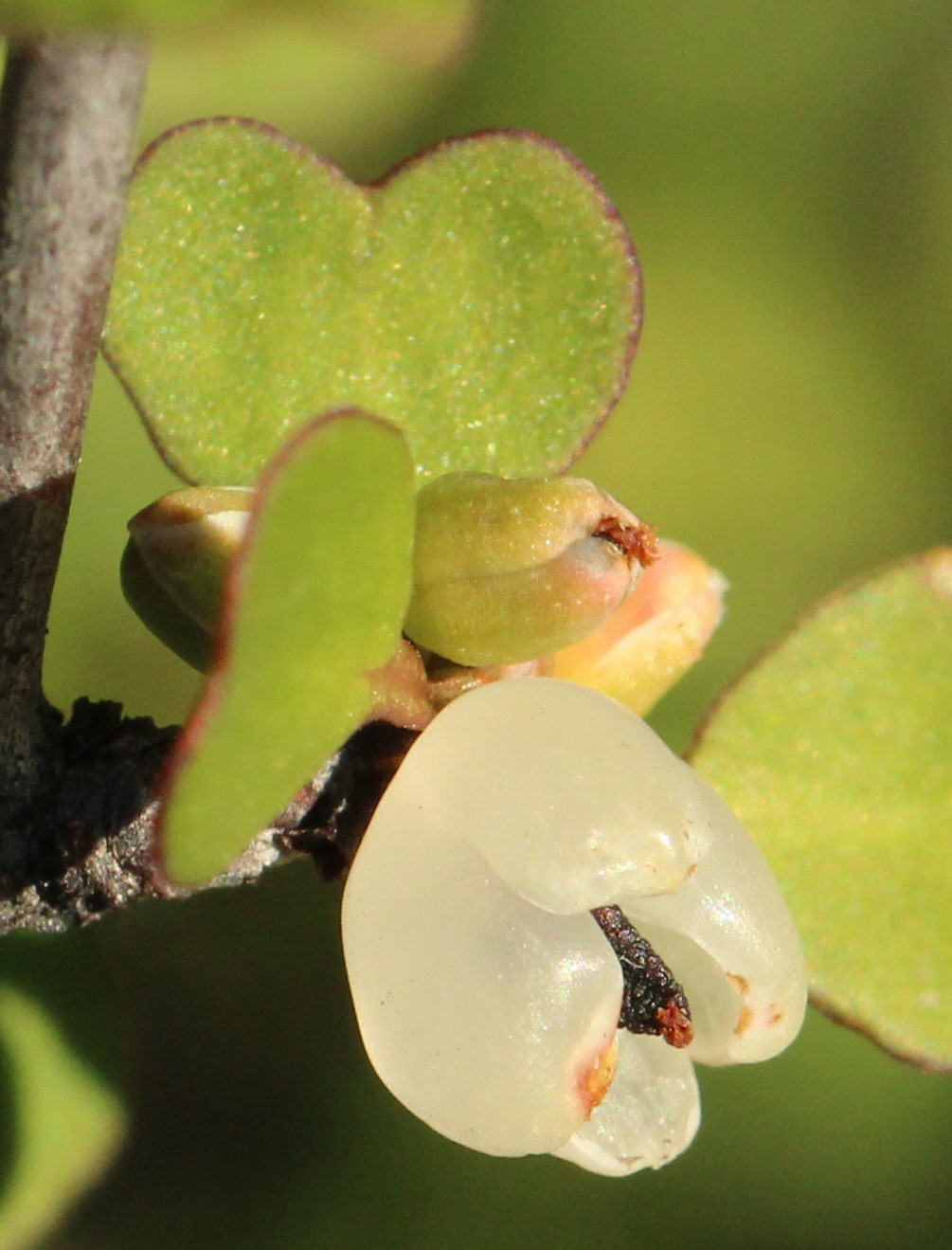
One mature fruit and seed at bottom, and an immature seed (recently pollinated flower) above.

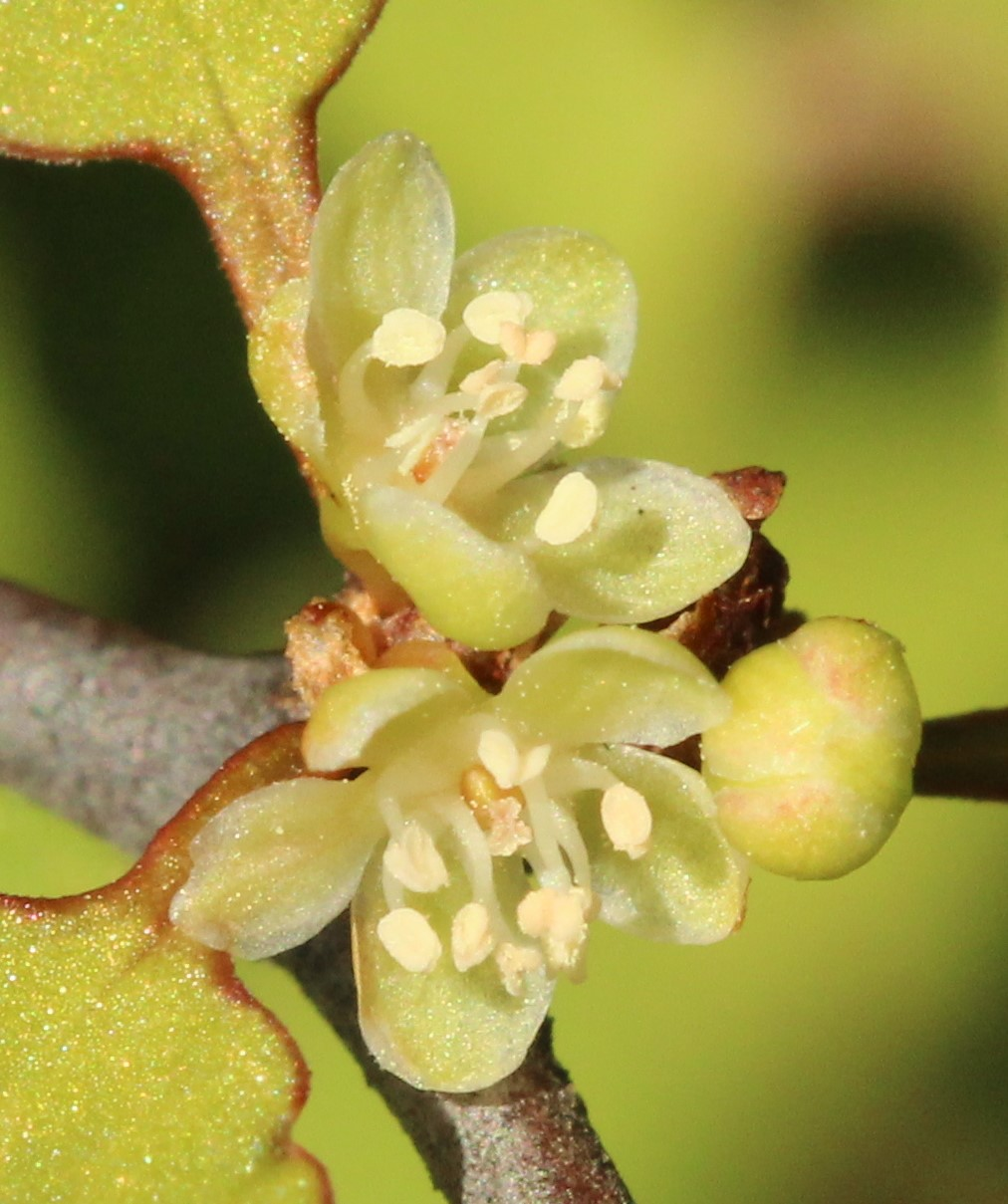
The flowers of M. astonii are inconspicuous, being pale and only 3 mm across.

== Taxonomy ==
Muehlenbeckia astonii was first described by botanist Donald Petrie in 1911, and named Muehlenbecki Astoni after Bernard Aston, who collected the specimens in Palliser Bay at the mouth of the Wainuiomata River in 1908. The type specimen is in Museum of New Zealand Te Papa Tongarewa, Wellington.

=== Etymology ===
The name "shrubby tororaro" distinguishes it from the similar species tororaro (Muehlenbeckia complexa), a scrambling plant with no trunk. It sometimes goes by the names wiggy-wig bush, (Note: According to Given (2001), this name was coined by Marlborough farmer Ted Reynolds in 1996 referring to an igloo-like plant on his property.) zig zag plant, wirebrush, shrubby pōhuehue, or mingimingi (a generic term for many small-leaved shrubs).

== Distribution ==
This species was probably once widely distributed in the drier lowland and coastal parts of eastern New Zealand, especially on terraced riverbeds, possibly as far south as the Waitaki Valley, South Canterbury. Its former range is hard to determine, as the species was only recognised by botanists decades after most of New Zealand's dry scrublands had been cleared for agriculture. Its deep root system helps it survive in dry conditions, and can grow on open rocky hillsides and stony ground, up to 300 metres (980 ft) altitude. It prefers free-draining, warm, sunny slopes, on moderately- to highly-fertile soil. M. astonii is currently only found in four areas:

1. Around Palliser Bay at the southern tip of the North Island, from Honeycomb Light south to Sinclair Head.
2. Northeastern Marlborough, currently only from the lower Awatere Valley, the Blind River, Clifford Bay, and Cape Campbell.
3. Some sites in North Canterbury discovered in the 1950s and 1960s: Balmoral, Weka Pass, Waikari Stream, Waiau, and along the Waipara River.
4. Kaitorete Spit at Lake Ellesmere (containing 90% of the world population), and Birdling's Flat and Lake Forsyth at the southwestern edge of Banks Peninsula.

== Cultivation ==
M. astonii is usually deciduous, though retains some leaves when grown in northern New Zealand. It prefers dry conditions, and is very drought-tolerant – excessive moisture can lead to root rot. Its unusual form and wiry orange stems make it an interesting garden plant. It tolerates light shade, but grows well as a shelter plant in exposed situations, tolerating salt spray, wind, and frost. It can be planted as an informal hedge, and responds well to being pruned into shape. If planted in rich soil, M. astonii can grow vigorously upwards and may require staking. It can be propagated by winter hardwood cuttings, which strike best in early spring, and grows well from outcrossed seed. The translucent fruits are considered decorative, so most plants sold in nurseries are female.

At a time when only 48 M. astonii were known to be growing wild in the Wellington area, the city councils of the Hutt Valley and Wellington began propagating plants from the wild and successfully growing males and females close together in traffic islands, each representing a different wild population, where they could pollinate each other. Traffic island populations were used as a stock to propagate 1500 plants from cuttings, and these were subsequently planted in Turakirae Reserve where the species once occurred.

== Conservation ==
M. astonii is now rare in the wild. In most of the sites it is known from there are only 1–3 old plants, and almost no seedlings: male and female flowers occur on separate plants and need to cross-pollinate, so isolated individuals cannot reproduce. Several small populations show no out-crossing because males and females are too far apart. Most of the population (2,500 of 2,800) occur on private land at Kaitorete Spit south of Lake Ellesmere, and even at Kaitorete there are very few young plants. Most wild populations are unlikely to recover without active management.

Originally M. astonii would have grown in the dry scrub habitat known as "grey scrub", in association with grasses or sedges and small-leaved shrubs such as Rubus squarrosus (leafless lawyer), Olearia solandri (coastal tree daisy), and Discaria toumatou (matagouri). These habitats were some of the first in New Zealand to be cleared for agriculture during colonisation, and so most individual M. astonii now are surviving in heavily modified open grassland. Plants suffer from trampling and browsing by livestock and other introduced mammals such as rabbits, hares, and possums, and seedlings are eaten by slugs and snails. Some plants have been seen succumbing to scale insects and fungal disease. Plants also have to compete with introduced grasses which smother them as seedlings, and with introduced shrubs such as boxthorn (Lycium ferocissimum).

Open agricultural land is a poor habitat for shrubby tororaro, but is suitable for the other scrambling and climbing members of the genus (M. complexa and M. australis) which both compete with and hybridise with M. astonii.

This species was not recognised as endangered in the wild until the 1980s, and a recovery plan was created in 2000. Its conservation status in 2004 was "Nationally Vulnerable", revised in 2009 to "Nationally Endangered". Representatives from all remnant populations of M. astonii have been propagated in large numbers, for both restoration planting on protected land, including Mana Island, and for gardens and urban planting projects. Three wild populations (at Cape Campbell, Balmoral Conservation Area, and Kaitorete Scientific Reserve) have legal protection and are undergoing restoration. Once threats are removed, wild populations of M. astonii appear to respond rapidly, so there is an excellent chance that this endangered species will recover.

In 2018, a farmer destroyed about one third of Kaitorete spit's M. astonii plants by spraying and cultivating three paddocks to plant oats.

== Works cited ==
Journals

- Wotton, Debra M. (2018). "Seed germination, dormancy and longevity in the endangered shrub Muehlenbeckia astonii (Polygonaceae)". New Zealand Journal of Botany. 56 (3): 331–341. Bibcode:2018NZJB...56..331W. doi:10.1080/0028825x.2018.1491862. ISSN 0028-825X. S2CID 91367481.
- Petrie, Donald (1911). "Descriptions of New Native Phanerogams". Transactions of the New Zealand Institute. [1910] 43: 254–257.
- Given, David R. (2001). "The Wiggy-wig bush – orphan or geriatric? Muehlenbeckia astonii (Polygonaceae) in North Canterbury and Marlborough". Journal of the Canterbury Botanical Society. 35: 48–51. hdl:10182/1254. ISSN 0110-5892.

Miscellaneous

- de Lange, Peter; Jones, Cathy (2000). "Shrubby tororaro (Muehlenbeckia astonii Petrie) recovery plan 2000–2010" (PDF). Threatened Species Recovery Plan. 31.
