= Okuti River =

Coordinates: 43.782216°S 172.784595°E

Location
- Country: New Zealand

Physical characteristics
- Mouth
  - location: Takiritawai River
- Length: 9 km (5.6 mi)

The Okuti River is a river of Banks Peninsula, in the Canterbury region of New Zealand's South Island. It flows west to meet the Okana River. The combined waters form the Takiritawai River, a short stream which flows into the eastern end of Lake Forsyth 2 kilometres (1.2 mi) south of the settlement of Little River.

== See also ==
- List of rivers of New Zealand
