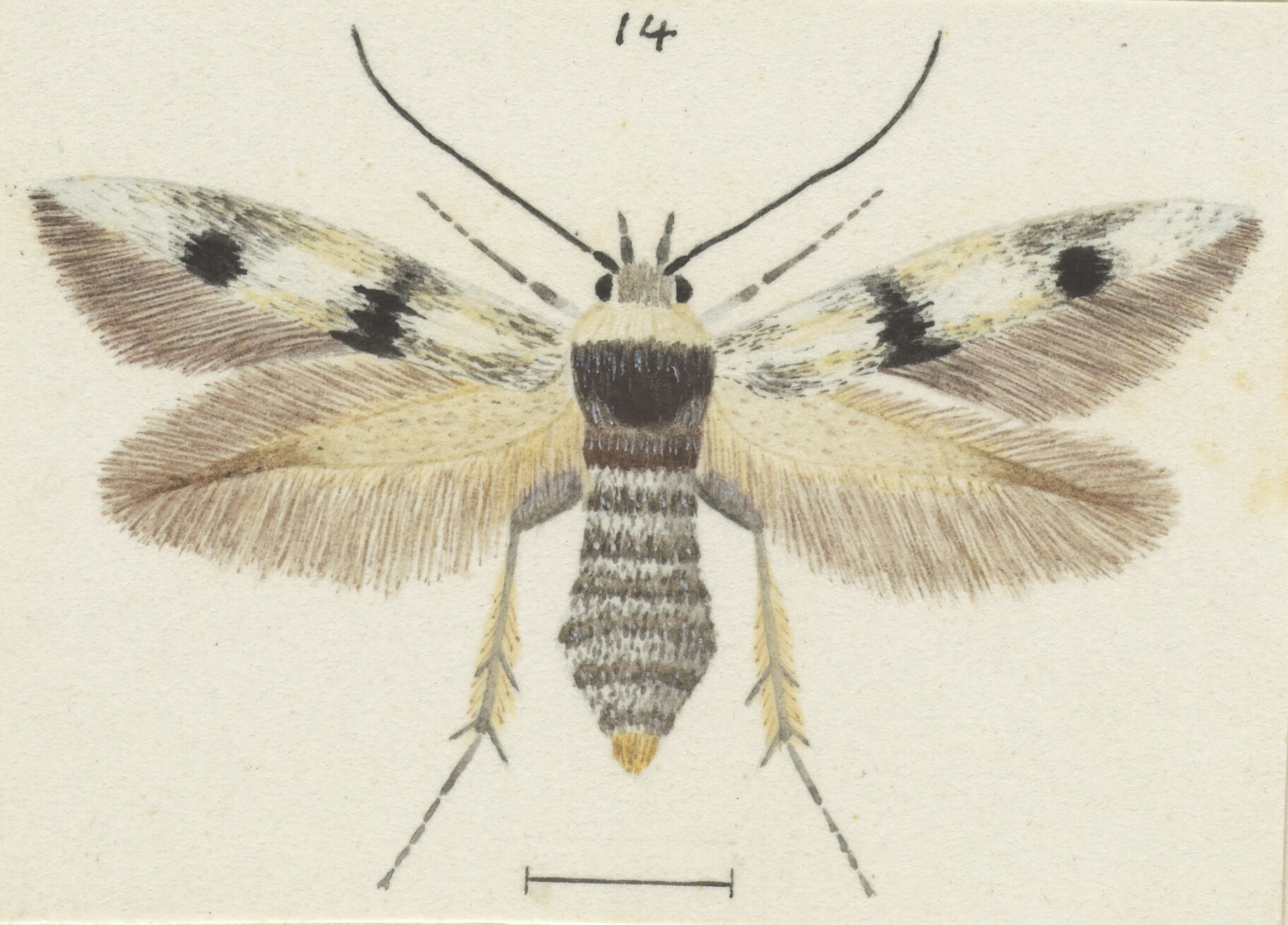
- male

Conservation status
- Nationally Critical (NZ TCS)

Scientific classification
- Kingdom: Animalia
- Phylum: Arthropoda
- Clade: Pancrustacea
- Class: Insecta
- Order: Lepidoptera
- Family: Scythrididae
- Genus: Scythris
- Species: S. niphozela

Binomial name
- Scythris niphozela Meyrick, 1931

= Scythris niphozela =

Species of moth, endemic to New Zealand

Scythris niphozela is a species of moth in the family Scythrididae. It is endemic to New Zealand. It is regarded as endemic to the Kaitorete Spit area although it had been recorded in the Manorburn Ecological District. This species inhabits the foredune area of Kaitorete Spit. The larvae feed on Carmichaelia appressa. Adults day fly from October to December. These moths are not attracted to light. In 2025 this species was classified as "nationally critical" under the New Zealand Threat Classification System by the Department of Conservation as it is impacted by climate change and is in need of conservation research as it is data poor, it is only known from one location and is range restricted. The conservation status of this species has worsened since 2015.

== Taxonomy ==
This species was described by Edward Meyrick in 1931 using specimens collected by Stewart Lindsay at Birding's Flat in December. George Hudson discussed and illustrated this species in his 1939 publication A supplement to the butterflies and moths of New Zealand. The holotype specimen is held at the Canterbury Museum.

== Description ==
Meyrick's description:

♂︎♀︎. 9–10mm – Head, palpi, thorax dark grey, more or less mixed or suffused white. Abdomen iridescent whitish grey, ♂︎ anal tuft tinged ochreous, ♀︎ basal third suffused blackish above, apex blackish beneath. Forewings elongate-lanceolate; dark grey posteriorly or nearly wholly suffused white; an irregular fascia of blackish suffusion from dorsum before middle; not reaching costa; a slightly narrower suffused blackish fascia from tornus, hardly reaching above middle; in whiter examples both these may be connected with costa by irregular grey marks; cilia grey, round apex, more or less suffused white. Hindwings 4 or 5 coincident; bronze-grey-whitish, apex greyer; in ♀︎ a thick streak of black suffusion along dorsum from near base to near middle; cilia light ochreous-grey.

== Distribution ==
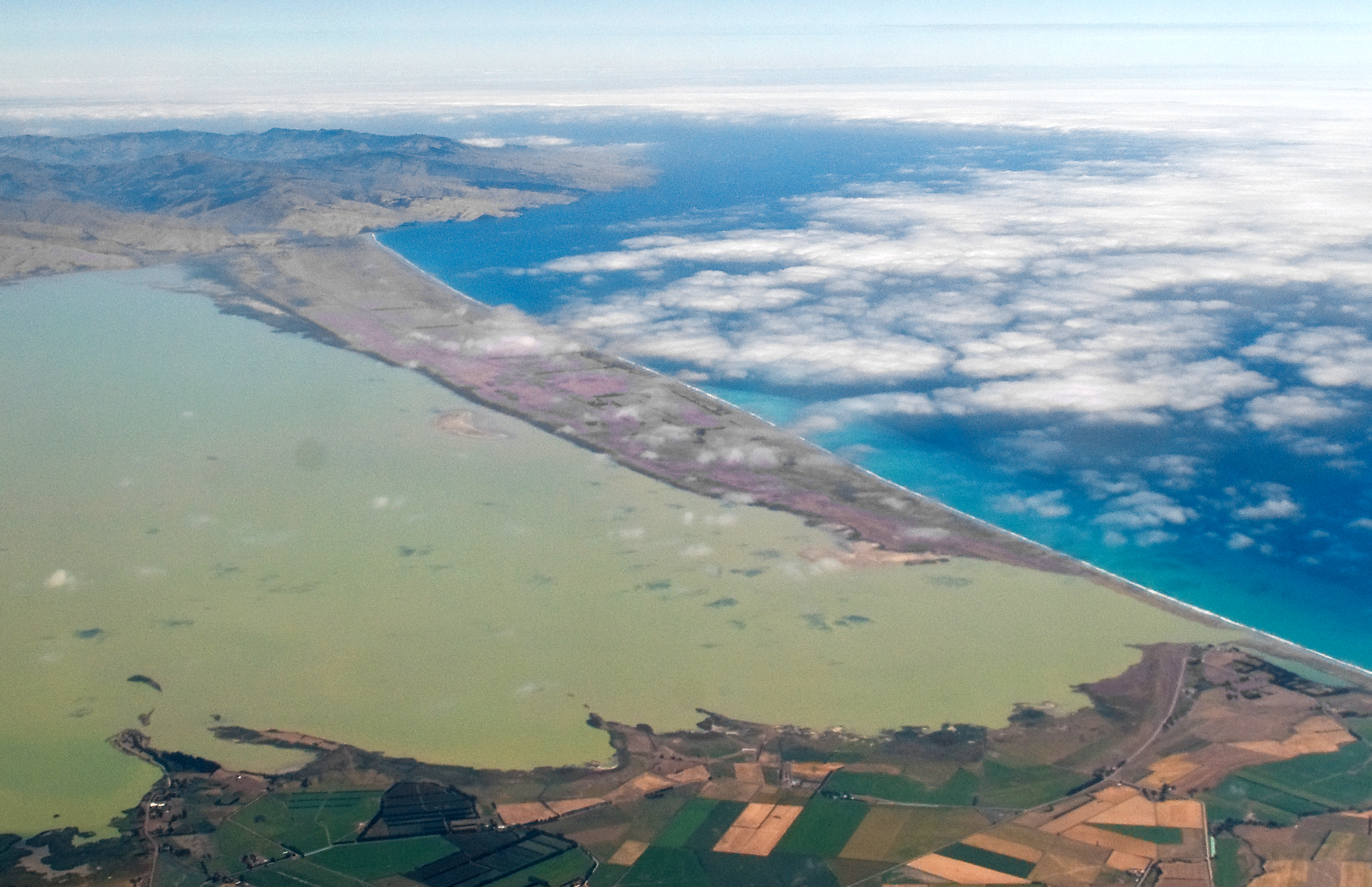
Aerial view Kaitorete Spit

This species is endemic to New Zealand. Other than the type locality of Birdings Flat at Kaitorete Spit, this species was recorded by Brian Patrick at Long Valley Ridge in the Manorburn Ecological District, Central Otago in February. However in 1994 Patrick described S. niphozela as endemic to the Kaitorete Spit area.

== Life history ==
From October to December, the larvae emerge from their eggs. Adult moths are day flyers from October to December. S. niphozela are not attracted to light traps.

== Host species and habitat ==
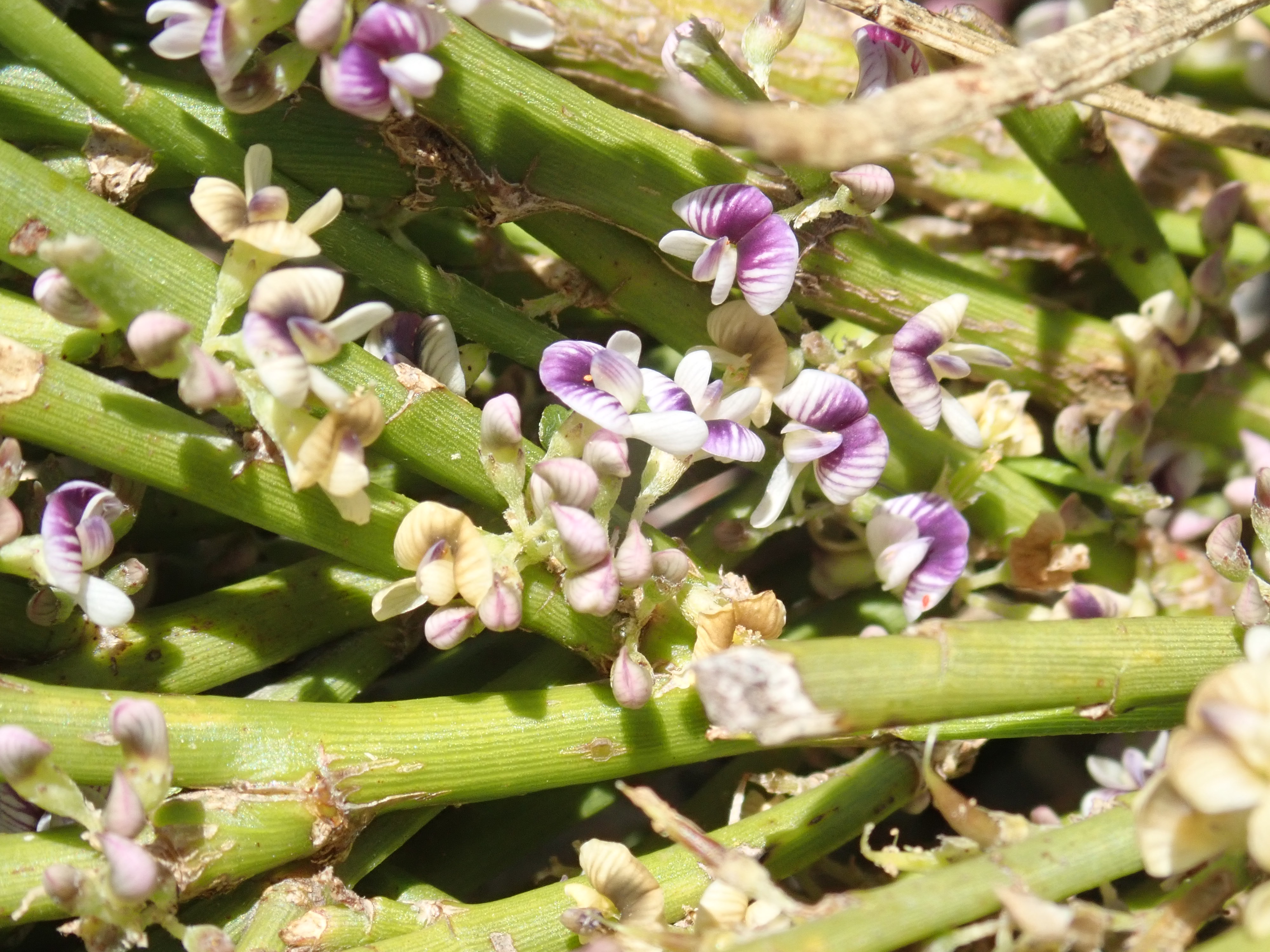
Larval host C. appressa

Larvae of this species have been found on Carmichaelia appressa, an endemic species of plant at the Kaitorete Spit. The moth inhabits the foredune area of the spit and is endemic to its gravel barrier.

== Conservation status ==
In 2025 this species was classified as "Nationally Critical" with the report stating that this species is impacted by climate change, is in need of conservation research as the species has a lack of data on both the population size as well as how the population is changing over time, is found in only one location and is range restricted. The conservation status of this species has worsened since 2015 when S. niphozela was regarded as being "At Risk, Naturally Uncommon" under the New Zealand Threat Classification System.
