= Little River, New Zealand =

Town in Canterbury, New Zealand

Little River
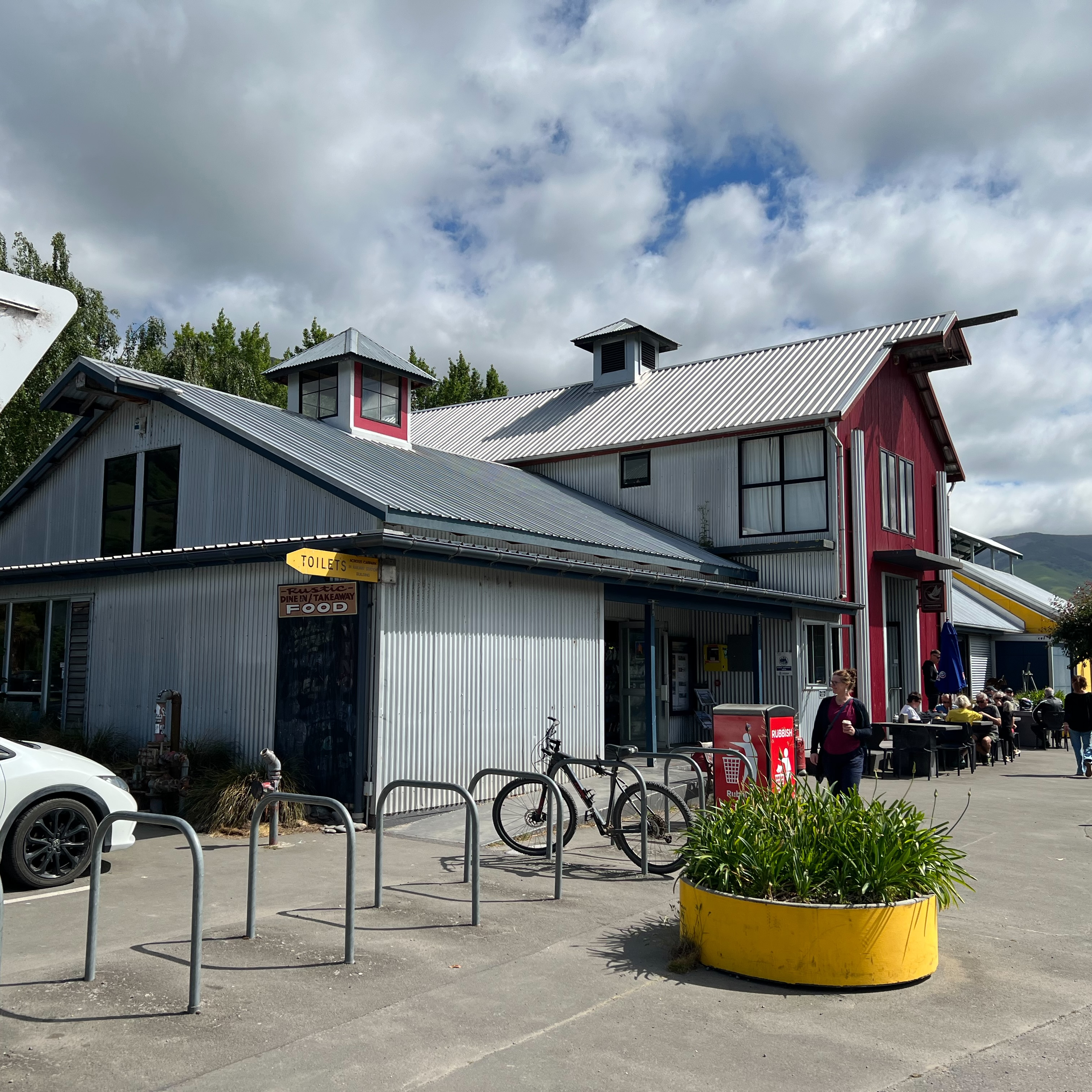
- Little River is a popular stopping point for tourists travelling to Akaroa.
- Interactive map of Little River
- Coordinates: 43.771°S 172.790°E
- Country: New Zealand
- Region: Canterbury Region
- District: Christchurch City
- Ward: Banks Peninsula
- Community: Te Pātaka o Rākaihautū Banks Peninsula
- Electorates: Banks Peninsula; Te Tai Tonga (Māori)

Government
  - Territorial Authority: Christchurch City Council
  - Regional council: Environment Canterbury
  - Mayor of Christchurch: Phil Mauger
  - Banks Peninsula MP: Vanessa Weenink
  - Te Tai Tonga MP: Tākuta Ferris

Area
  - Total: 2.74 km^{2} (1.06 sq mi)

Population (June 2025)
  - Total: 300
  - Density: 110/km^{2} (280/sq mi)

Little River is a town on Banks Peninsula in the Canterbury region of New Zealand.

== Location ==
Little River is approximately 30 minutes drive from Akaroa, a tourist destination on Banks Peninsula, and 45 minutes drive from Christchurch. It is on State Highway 75, which links Christchurch and Akaroa.

The road from Christchurch is at sea level but once past Little River, the road rises steeply to the top of the summit road. From the summit at Hilltop, all of the bays on the peninsula are accessible on equally steep roads. Not all roads are sealed and some are more suited to four wheel drive vehicles.

== Rail Trail ==
The Little River Rail Trail is a cycling and walking track that opened in 2006, which largely follows the course of the old Little River Branch railway that ran to Little River from its junction with the Southbridge Branch in Lincoln. This branch line was opened to Little River on 11 March 1886, closed to passengers on 14 April 1951, and closed to all traffic on 30 June 1962. Between 1927 and 1934, Little River railway passengers were served by the experimental and popular Edison battery-electric railcar, the only one of its type to be built.

== History ==
The population early last century numbered in the thousands, and people were mainly employed in timber milling and farming. A fairly localised but major industry was the harvesting and threshing of cocksfoot.

== Churches ==
=== St John the Evangelist ===
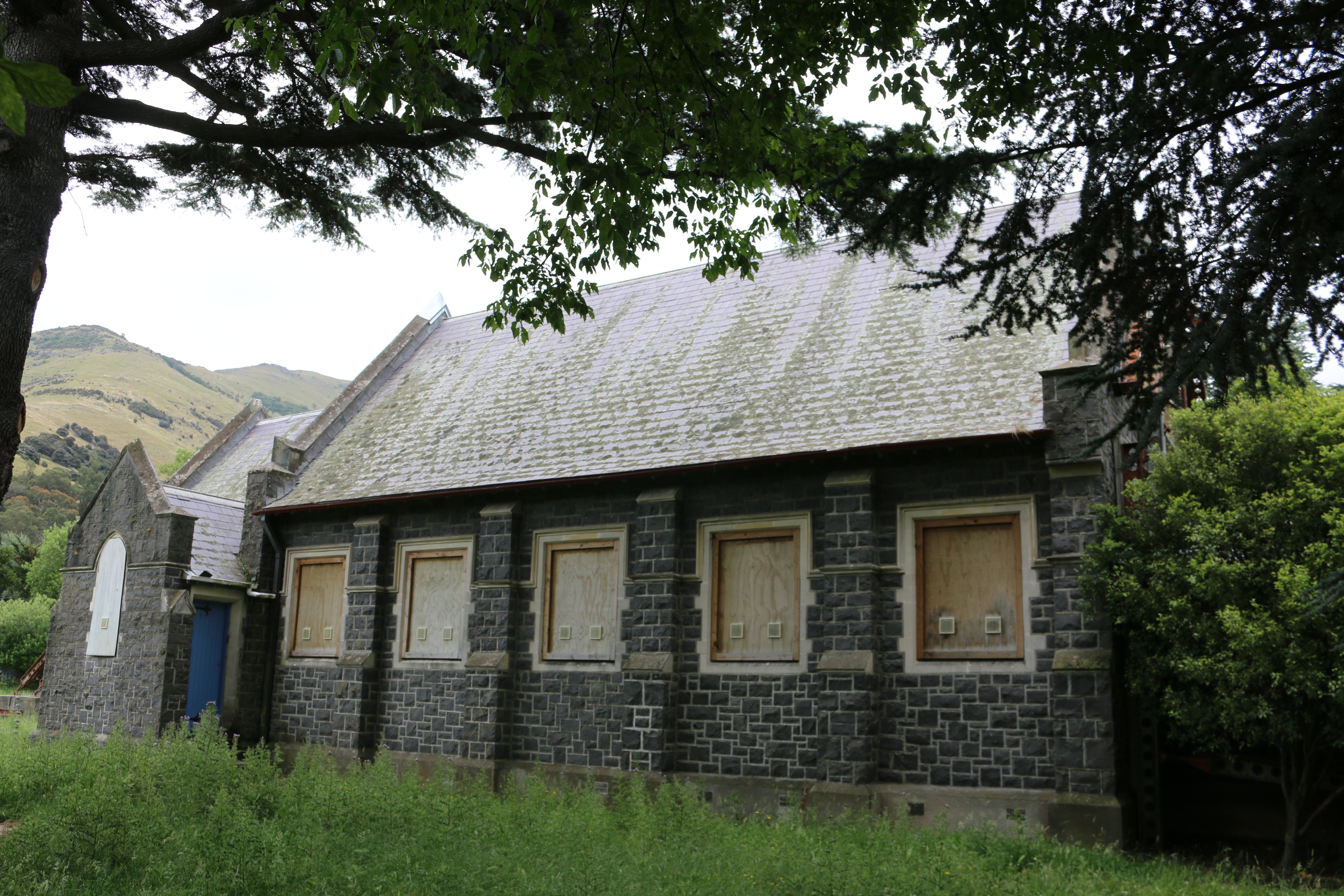
St John The Evangelist Catholic Church

St John The Evangelist church is a Catholic church located in Little River. It was built around 1924. It is a category two historic place. It suffered earthquake damage and was closed in 2022.

=== St Andrews ===
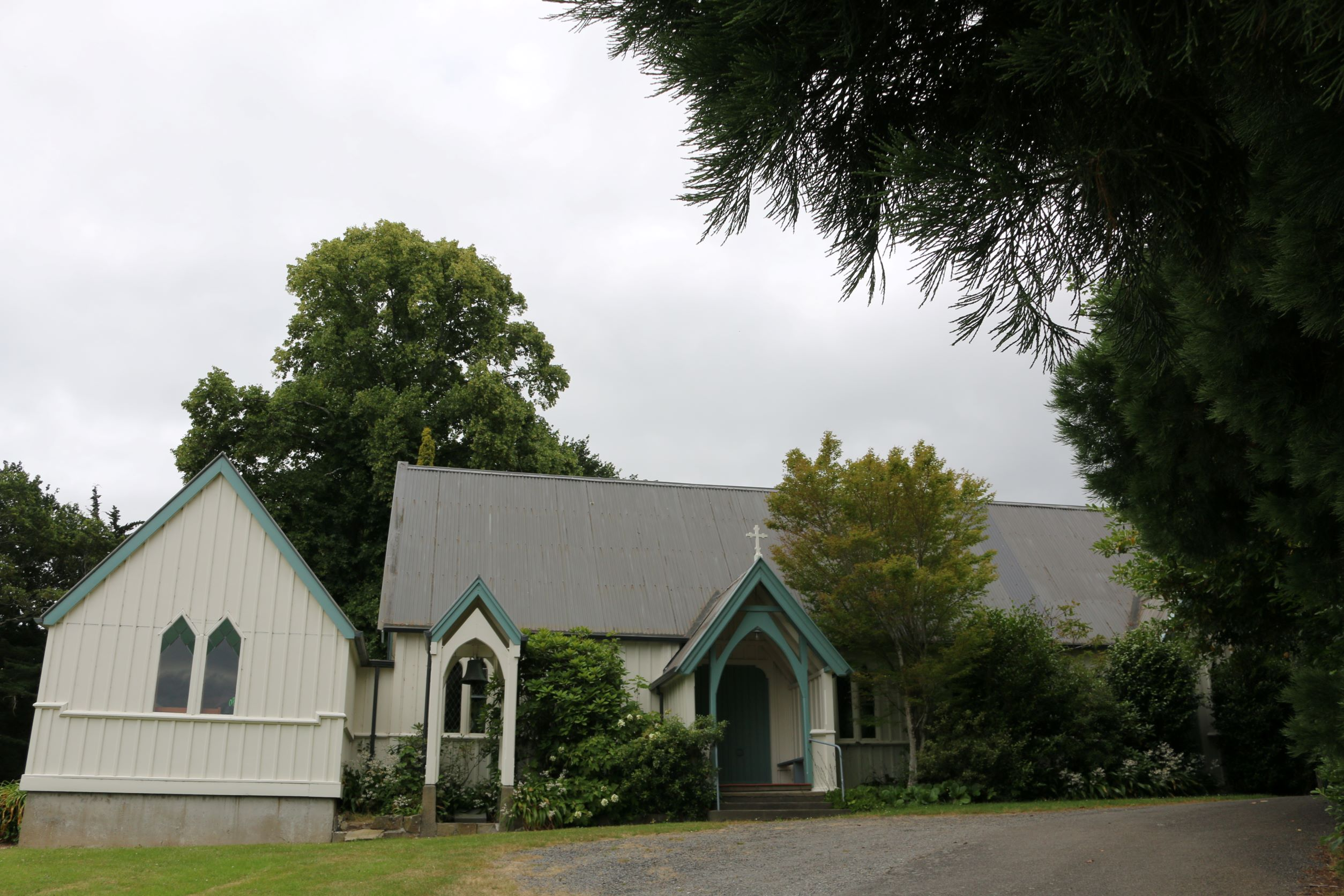
St Andrews Anglican Church

St Andrews Anglican church is located at 32 Upper Church St. The first Anglican services were held in 1866 in Little River. St Andrews was built in a gothic style and opened in 1879. It was designed by architect Benjamin Mountfort and opened by Bishop Harper. Sir Miles Warren designed the lounge which was added to the eastern end of the church in 1990. The church is a category two historic place.

=== Marae ===
Wairewa marae, a marae (tribal meeting ground) of Ngāi Tahu and its Wairewa Rūnanga branch, is located at Little River. It includes Te Mako wharenui (meeting house).

== Demographics ==
Little River is described by Stats NZ as a rural settlement, and covers 2.74 km^{2} (1.06 sq mi). It had an estimated population of 300 as of June 2025, with a population density of 109 people per km^{2}. It is part of the Banks Peninsula South statistical area.

Historical population for Little River
Year	Pop.	±% p.a.
2006	228	—
2013	297	+3.85%
2018	306	+0.60%
2023	303	−0.20%
The 2006 population is for a smaller area of 2.64 km^{2}. Source:

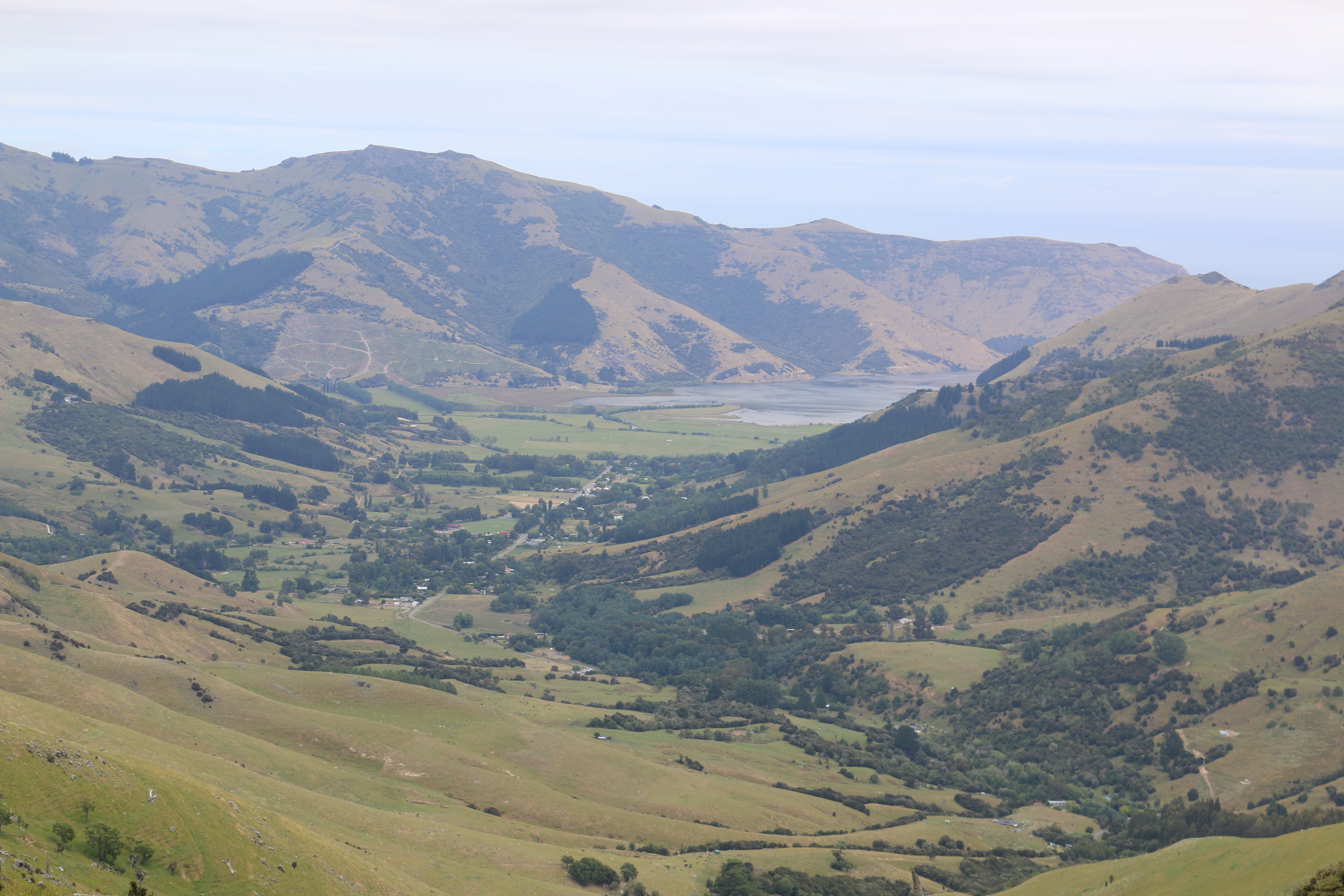
Little River, New Zealand (December 2020)

Little River had a population of 303 in the 2023 New Zealand census, a decrease of 3 people (−1.0%) since the 2018 census, and an increase of 6 people (2.0%) since the 2013 census. There were 156 males and 144 females in 117 dwellings. 5.0% of people identified as LGBTIQ+. The median age was 47.0 years (compared with 38.1 years nationally). There were 45 people (14.9%) aged under 15 years, 51 (16.8%) aged 15 to 29, 168 (55.4%) aged 30 to 64, and 39 (12.9%) aged 65 or older.

People could identify as more than one ethnicity. The results were 92.1% European (Pākehā); 13.9% Māori; 3.0% Asian; 1.0% Middle Eastern, Latin American and African New Zealanders (MELAA); and 4.0% other, which includes people giving their ethnicity as "New Zealander". English was spoken by 99.0%, Māori by 3.0%, Samoan by 1.0%, and other languages by 9.9%. No language could be spoken by 1.0% (e.g. too young to talk). New Zealand Sign Language was known by 1.0%. The percentage of people born overseas was 22.8, compared with 28.8% nationally.

Religious affiliations were 29.7% Christian, 1.0% Māori religious beliefs, 1.0% Buddhist, 1.0% New Age, and 1.0% other religions. People who answered that they had no religion were 57.4%, and 7.9% of people did not answer the census question.

Of those at least 15 years old, 66 (25.6%) people had a bachelor's or higher degree, 156 (60.5%) had a post-high school certificate or diploma, and 39 (15.1%) people exclusively held high school qualifications. The median income was $35,900, compared with $41,500 nationally. 27 people (10.5%) earned over $100,000 compared to 12.1% nationally. The employment status of those at least 15 was 126 (48.8%) full-time, 60 (23.3%) part-time, and 9 (3.5%) unemployed.

=== Banks Peninsula South ===
Banks Peninsula South statistical area, which also includes Birdlings Flat, covers 371.61 km^{2} (143.48 sq mi). It had an estimated population of 1,280 as of June 2025, with a population density of 3.4 people per km^{2}.

Historical population for Banks Peninsula South
Year	Pop.	±% p.a.
2006	1,026	—
2013	1,101	+1.01%
2018	1,167	+1.17%
2023	1,287	+1.98%

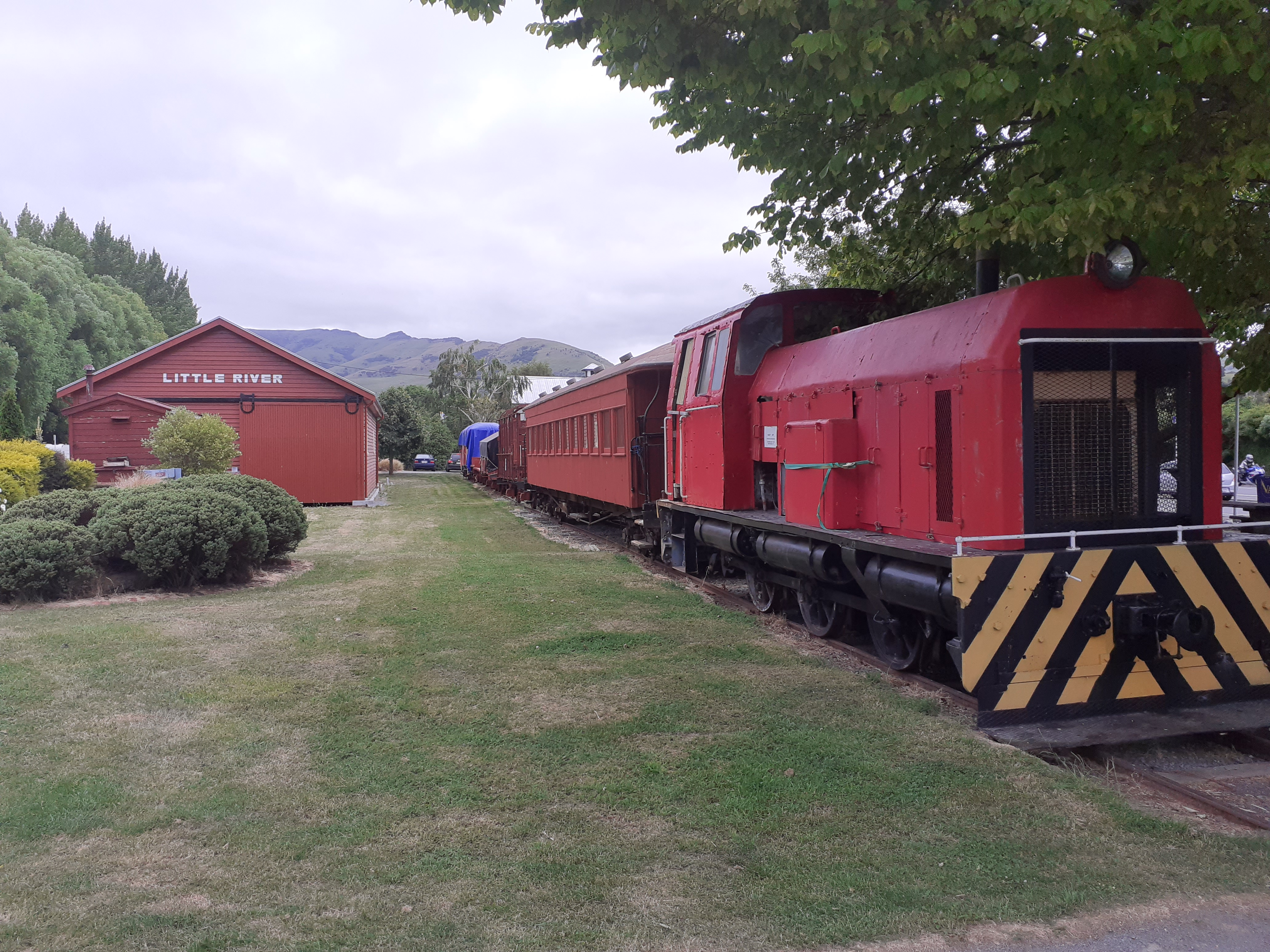
Little River Railway Station (December 2020)

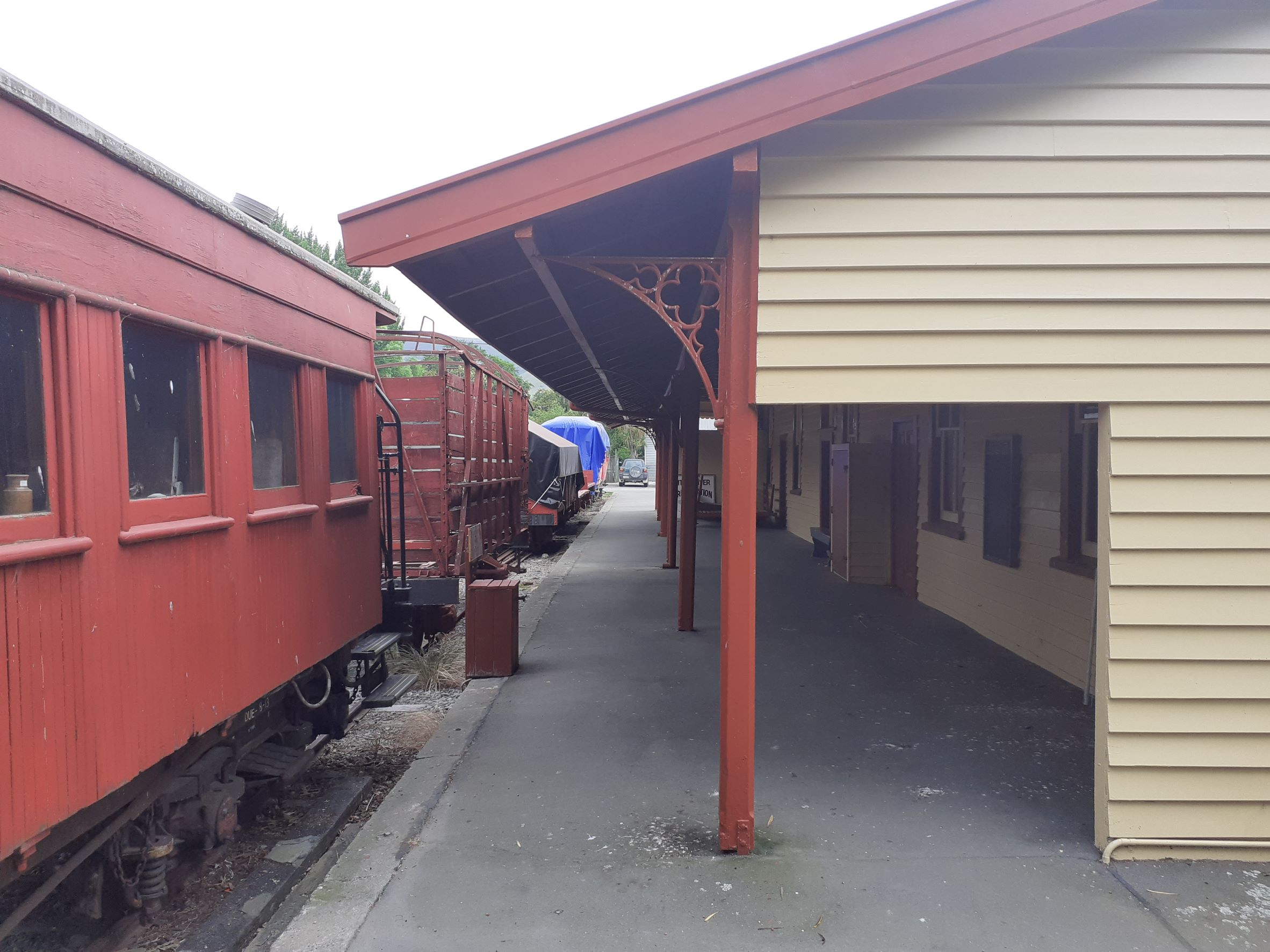
Little River Railway Station (December 2020)

Banks Peninsula South had a population of 1,287 in the 2023 New Zealand census, an increase of 120 people (10.3%) since the 2018 census, and an increase of 186 people (16.9%) since the 2013 census. There were 657 males, 624 females, and 9 people of other genders in 537 dwellings. 3.7% of people identified as LGBTIQ+. The median age was 49.7 years (compared with 38.1 years nationally). There were 174 people (13.5%) aged under 15 years, 177 (13.8%) aged 15 to 29, 717 (55.7%) aged 30 to 64, and 225 (17.5%) aged 65 or older.

People could identify as more than one ethnicity. The results were 93.5% European (Pākehā); 10.0% Māori; 1.2% Pasifika; 2.6% Asian; 0.9% Middle Eastern, Latin American and African New Zealanders (MELAA); and 4.2% other, which includes people giving their ethnicity as "New Zealander". English was spoken by 98.4%, Māori by 2.3%, Samoan by 0.2%, and other languages by 11.0%. No language could be spoken by 1.4% (e.g. too young to talk). New Zealand Sign Language was known by 1.4%. The percentage of people born overseas was 22.6, compared with 28.8% nationally.

Religious affiliations were 28.9% Christian, 0.2% Islam, 0.5% Māori religious beliefs, 0.5% Buddhist, 1.9% New Age, and 1.6% other religions. People who answered that they had no religion were 58.3%, and 8.9% of people did not answer the census question.

Of those at least 15 years old, 285 (25.6%) people had a bachelor's or higher degree, 642 (57.7%) had a post-high school certificate or diploma, and 186 (16.7%) people exclusively held high school qualifications. The median income was $36,000, compared with $41,500 nationally. 132 people (11.9%) earned over $100,000 compared to 12.1% nationally. The employment status of those at least 15 was 567 (50.9%) full-time, 216 (19.4%) part-time, and 24 (2.2%) unemployed.

== Agricultural and Pastoral Show ==
Every year in January the Little River Agricultural and Pastoral Show is held in the Awa-Iti Domain situated in the middle of the town. This attracts many visitors as well as exhibitors and competitors in the equestrian arena and the numerous displays of sheep, cattle, dog trialling, produce, floral and cooking.

== Waterways ==
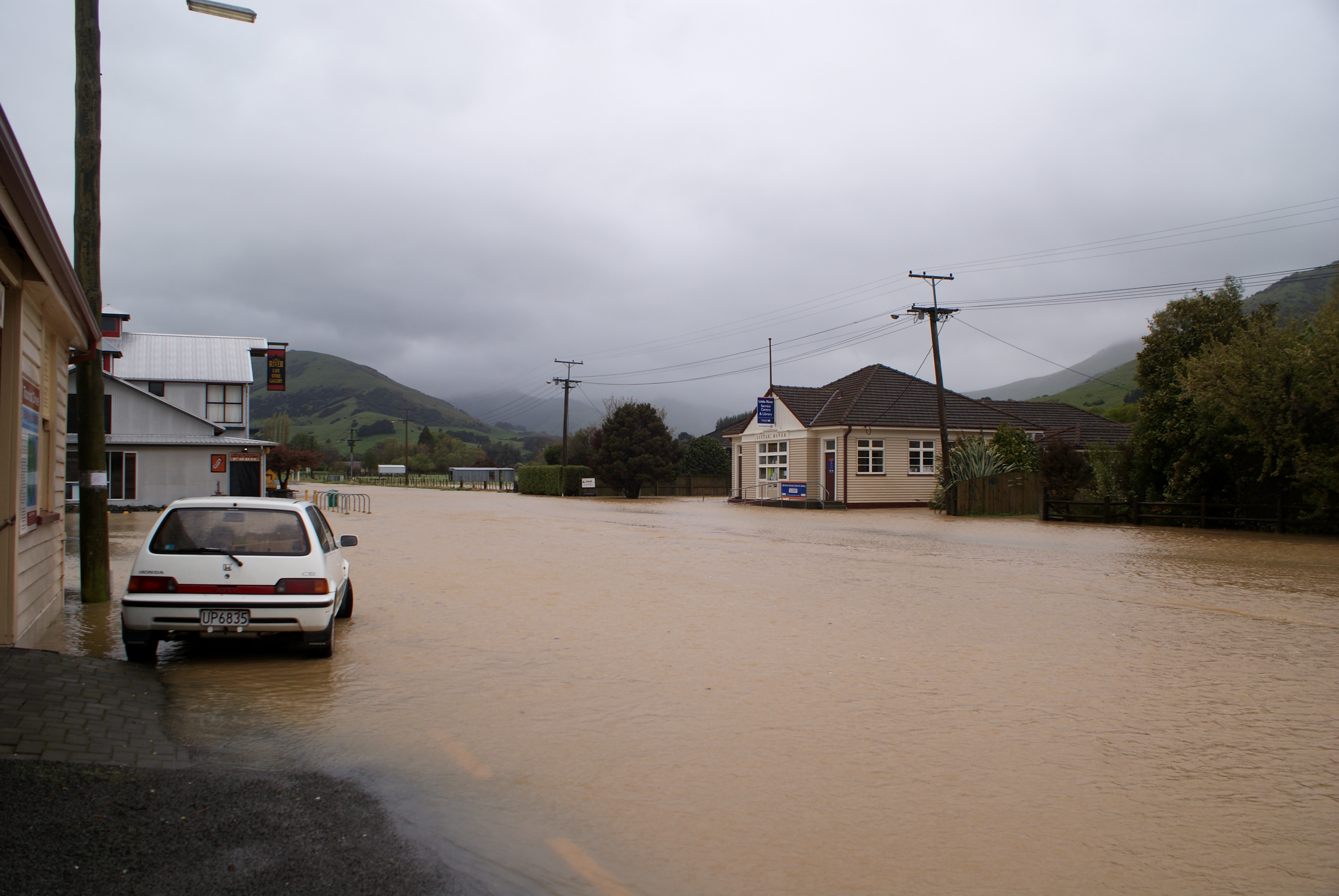
Little River flooded by the Okana River in October 2011

Little River nestles in a deep valley and myriads of streams and springs converge to form the Okana and Okuti Rivers. The combined waters form the Takiritawai River, a short stream which flows into the eastern end of Lake Wairewa / Lake Forsyth. The lake, rivers and streams abound in trout, perch (redfin) and eel. The world record for the largest brown trout caught was held by one of these rivers in the 1960s.

On 19 October 2011, the Okana River caused the worst flooding in Little River for many years, with State Highway 75 closed. Long term residents believe that the flooding was the worst since the "Wahine storm" on 10 April 1968.

== Education ==
Little River School is a full primary school catering for years 1 to 8. It had a roll of 36 as of July 2026.

Little River has had three schools; the first opened in 1873, and was replaced in 1880. That was destroyed by fire in 1939. The current school opened in 1942.

== Notable residents ==
- Alana Bremner New Zealand rugby player
- Chelsea Bremner New Zealand rugby player
