= Okana River =

Coordinates: 43°46′S 172°48′E

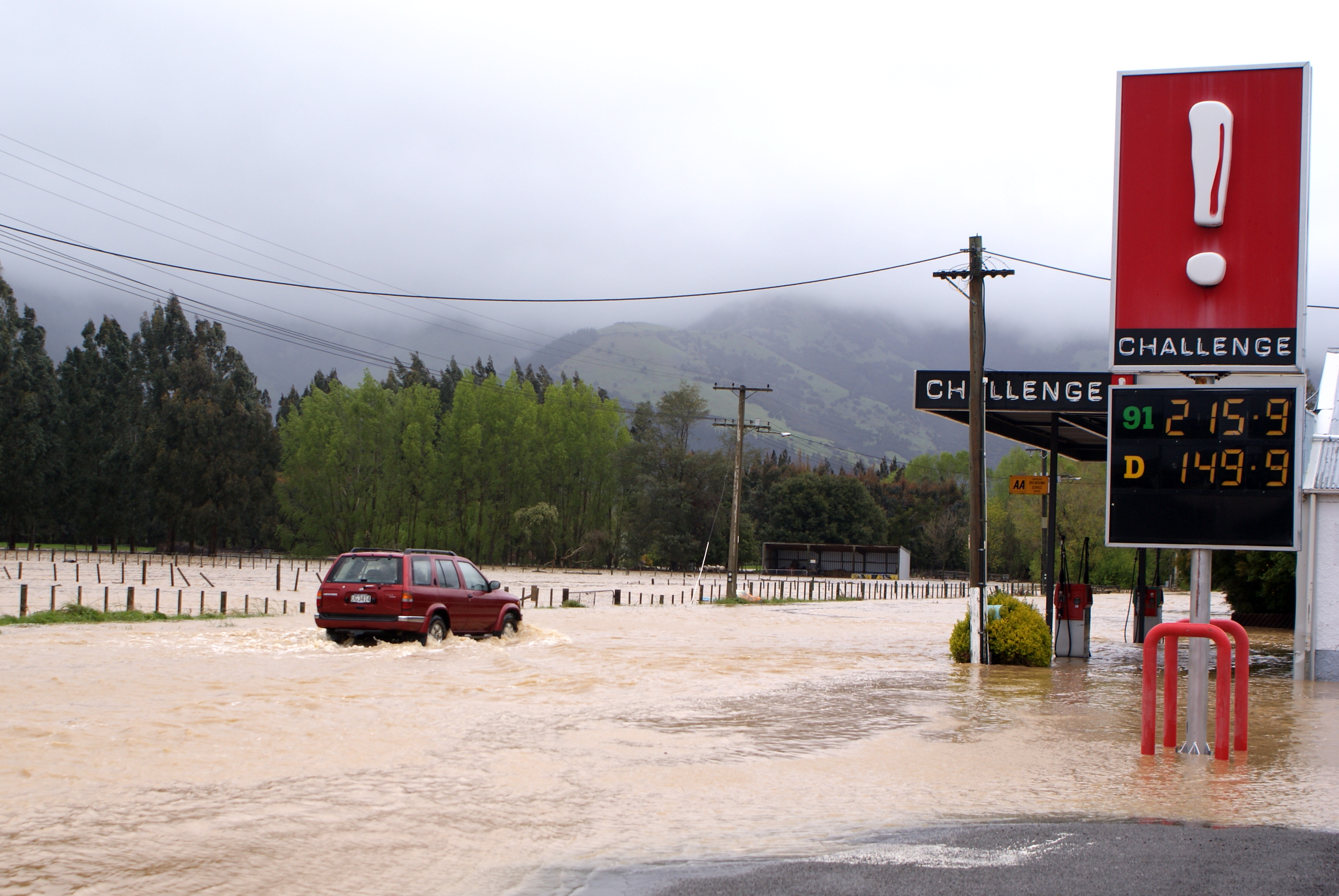
- Okana River flooding Little River

Location
- Country: New Zealand

Physical characteristics
- Mouth
  - location: Takiritawai River

The Okana River, formerly called the Ohiriri River, is a river on Banks Peninsula in the Canterbury region of New Zealand's South Island. It flows southwest past the settlement of Little River where it meets the Okuti River, the two rivers forming the short Takiritawai River which flows into the northern end of Te Roto o Wairewa / Lake Forsyth.

On 19 October 2011, the Okana River caused the worst flooding in Little River for many years, with State Highway 75 closed. Long-term residents believe that the flooding was the worst since the Wahine storm on 10 April 1968.

== See also ==
- List of rivers of New Zealand
