= Kiwaia jeanae =

Scientific classification
- Kingdom: Animalia
- Phylum: Arthropoda
- Clade: Pancrustacea
- Class: Insecta
- Order: Lepidoptera
- Family: Gelechiidae
- Genus: Kiwaia
- Species: K. jeanae

Binomial name
- Kiwaia jeanae Philpott, 1930

Species of moth

Kiwaia jeanae, also known as the Kaitorete jumper or mat daisy jumper, is a species of moth in the family Gelechiidae. It is endemic to New Zealand. This species is classified as "At Risk, Naturally Uncommon" by the Department of Conservation. Both the males and females of this species are brachypterous.

== Taxonomy ==
This species was described by Alfred Philpott in 1930 using a specimen collected at Birdlings Flat, Canterbury. George Hudson also discussed and illustrated this species in 1939. This species is named in honour of Jean Lindsay, the first collector of the species. The holotype specimen is held at the Canterbury Museum.

== Description ==
Philpott originally described the species as follows:

♂︎. 8mm. Head shining creamy white. Palpi ocherous white, apex of terminal segment blackish. Antennae brownish black. Thorax grey. Abdomen ocherous mixed with grey. Legs grey. Forewings lanceolate; whitish ocherous mixed with grey; a large subtriangular blackish blotch at 1/3; a round black spot in disk at 2/3; apex black anteriorly obscured margined with whitish; fringes ocherous grey. Hindwings greatly reduced; about a quarter the length of forewings; densely covered with long fine ocherous whitish hair-scales which radiate in all directions.

It has been hypothesised that the hairs on the hind wings of the male may assist in the release of pheromones attracting the females of the species. Both the males and females of this species are brachypterous. This reduction in wing size is rare in male moths.

== Distribution ==
This species is endemic to New Zealand. It is found in North and Mid Canterbury. As well as its type locality, this species has also occurred at Kaitorete Spit, Amberley beach, at Leithfield beach, both near Amberley.

== Biology and behaviour ==
Very little is known of the biology of this species. The adult moths of this species jump like a flea. Adult moths have been collected from January to mid April.

== Habitat and host species ==
This species has been collected on active sand dunes or shingle soils covered with cushion plants. The host plants for the larvae of this species are Raoulia mats and it has been hypothesised that the larvae are detritivorous.

== Conservation status ==
This species has been classified as having the "At Risk, Naturally Uncommon" conservation status under the New Zealand Threat Classification System. This species is at risk because of habitat damage caused by commercial shingle removal and stock trampling. The main threats to this species at Kaitorete Spit have been recorded as weed invasion, damage to habitat by recreational vehicles, housing development of habitat and predators.
