= Little River Branch =

Railway line in New Zealand

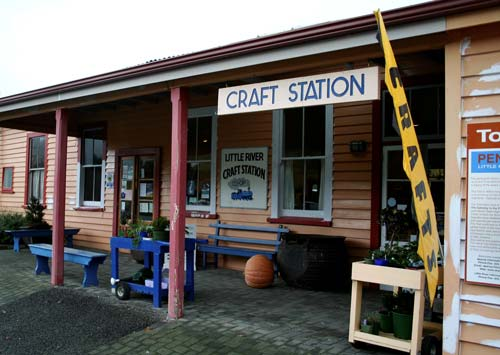
- The former railway station at the terminus in Little River

Overview
- Status: Closed
- Owner: Railways Department
- Locale: Canterbury, New Zealand
- Termini: Lincoln Junction; Little River
- Stations: 7

Service
- Type: Heavy Rail
- System: New Zealand Government Railways (NZGR)
- Operator(s): Railways Department

History
- Opened: 11 March 1886
- Closed: 1 July 1962

Technical
- Line length: 36.37 km
- Number of tracks: Single
- Character: Rural
- Track gauge: 3 ft 6 in (1,067 mm)

Map

The Little River Branch was a branch line railway that formed part of New Zealand's national rail network. It diverged from the Southbridge Branch in Lincoln and ran down to Banks Peninsula in the Canterbury region of the South Island. It was opened to Little River on 11 March 1886 and operated until 1 July 1962.

== Construction ==
Little River contained one of only two significant stands of timber in the Canterbury region (the other, near Oxford, was serviced by the Oxford Branch), and accordingly, plans were made to build a line to provide convenient transportation and stimulate economic activity. These were finalised in 1879, and construction was under way by the next year. On 16 May 1882, the first 27.44 km of the line were opened to Birdling's Flat, and almost four years later, the next nine kilometres were opened to Little River. There were proposals to extend the line as far as Akaroa, but these did not eventuate and Little River remained the terminus.

== Operation ==
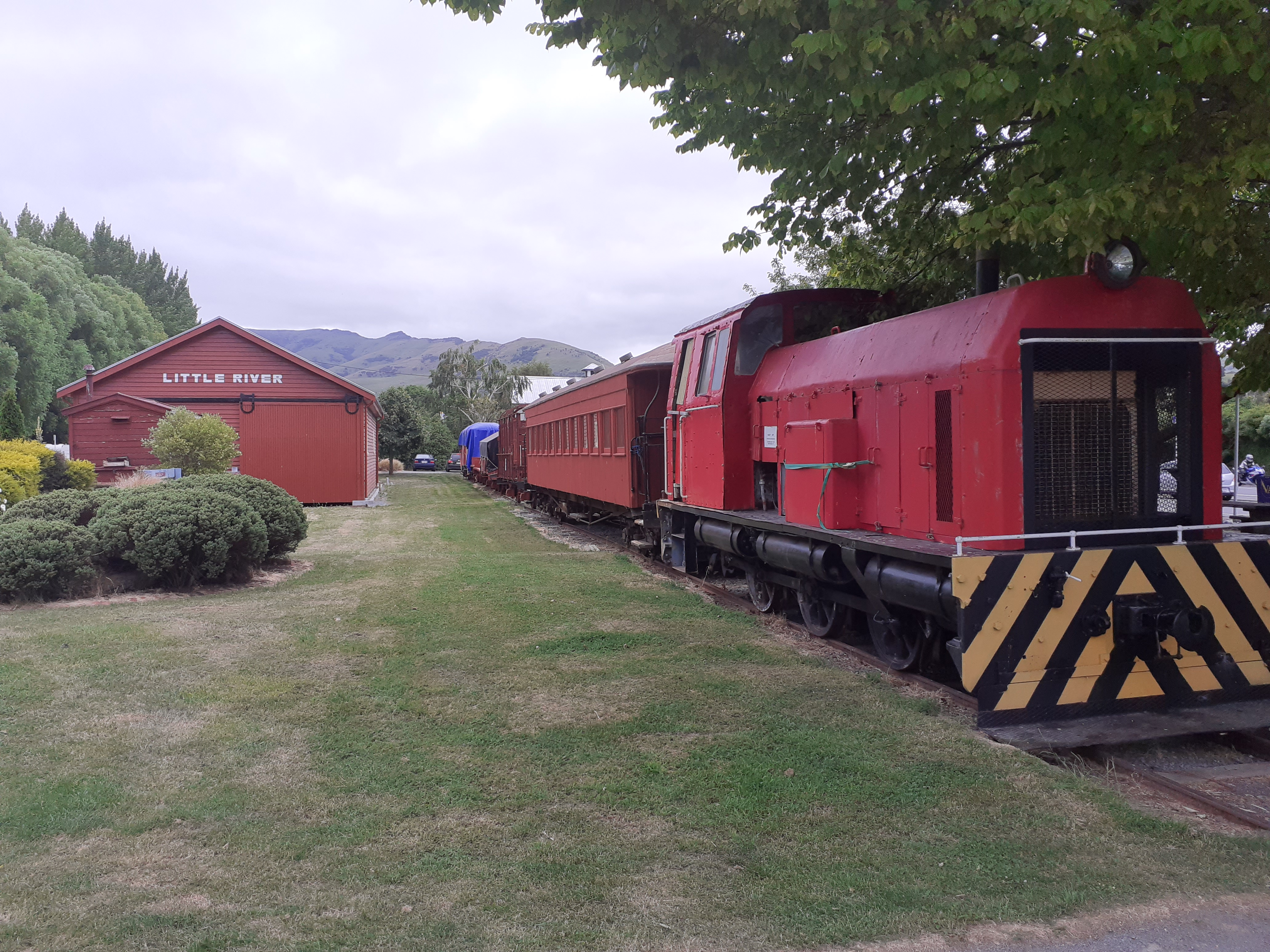
Little River Railway Station (December 2020)

In the early years of the line, it operated profitably as large quantities of timber were transported by rail to destinations off the branch. This freight was mainly but not solely loaded in Little River. There was also significant agricultural activity in the area; livestock and farming supplies were important commodities at all stations. As time progressed, the timber traffic declined as no effort was made to replant and sustain the industry, and accordingly, the line's traffic became increasingly focused on the agricultural industry that was expanding into the felled areas.

Passenger numbers totalled over 10,000 in the line's first year of operation, though no dedicated passenger trains ran. Instead, until 1927, passengers were carried on mixed trains. In 1927, an experiment was conducted on the Little River Branch when the Edison battery-electric railcar was trialled. It provided a twice daily dedicated passenger service each way between Christchurch and Little River, completing the trip in 69 minutes. Affordable and efficient, the railcar proved popular with travellers, but its life was abruptly cut short in 1934 when it was destroyed in a depot fire and not replaced due to the poor economic conditions of the Great Depression, forcing passengers back to the slower mixed trains.

Around this time, traffic started to seriously decline. Timber traffic was becoming non-existent because resources were almost exhausted, and road transport was increasingly competitive with rail. A Royal Commission in 1930 had recommended that passenger services be cancelled and freight trains operated only thrice weekly, but provisions were made for passengers until 14 April 1951, and in 1952, goods trains were still operating nine times a week. However, the line was making a financial loss and service cuts could not alleviate it. With the line becoming too uneconomic to continue to operate, it was closed on 30 June 1962, along with the Southbridge Branch beyond Lincoln.

== The branch today ==
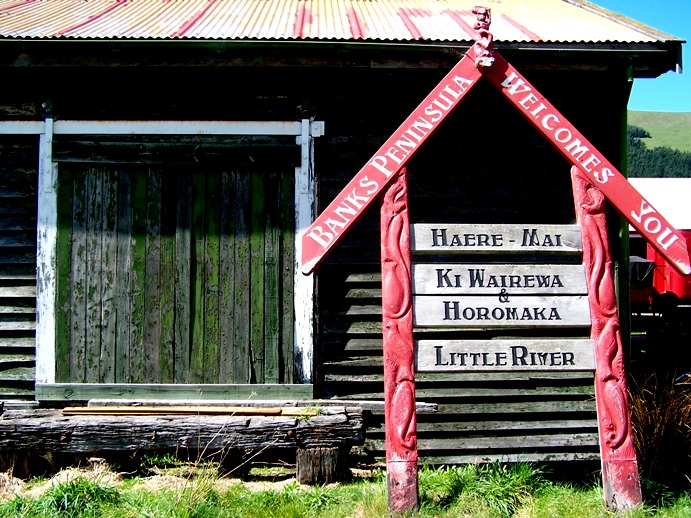
Welcome sign leaning against the goods shed of the Little River Railway Station

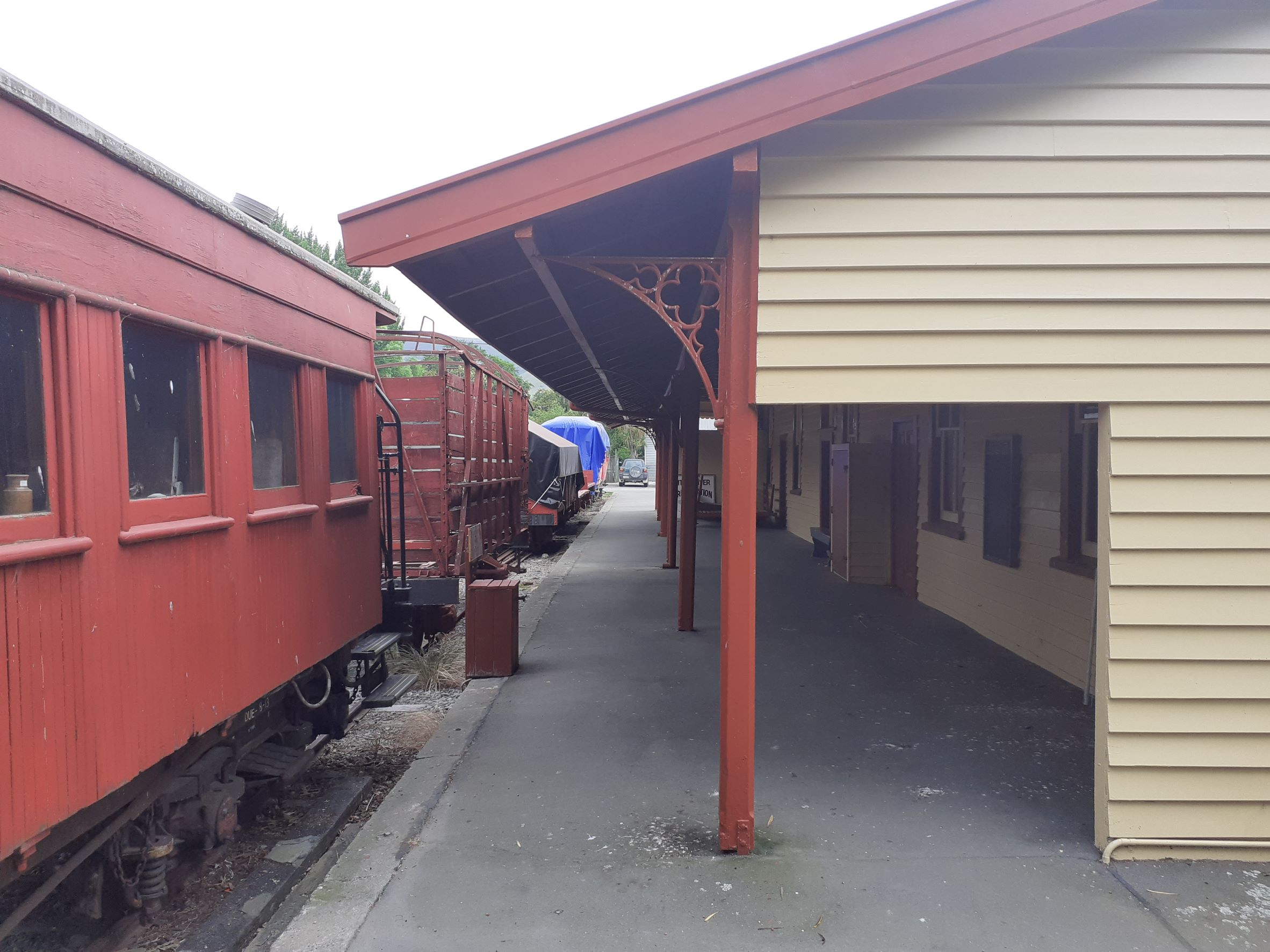
Little River Railway Station (December 2020)

The Little River Branch is one of New Zealand's best preserved former railways. The Little River Rail Trail has been established as a walking and cycling track utilising the former track bed of the branch, in much the same style as the Otago Central Rail Trail. On 28 May 2006, the first section, from Motukarara to Catons Bay Reserve, was opened to the public, and plans exist to convert the entire line into a rail trail, though it may deviate from the railway's original route in places to ensure easy accessibility. Furthermore, the Little River station has been well preserved by the local community, who have converted into a centre that sells local craft and historical items. The platform and goods shed are still in good repair, and some metres of trackage have been installed so that a number of preserved freight wagons can be displayed.
