= Takiritawai River =

Coordinates: 43°48′S 172°46′E

Location
- Country: New Zealand

Physical characteristics
- Source
  - location: Okana River, Okuti River
- Mouth
  - location: Lake Forsyth
- Length: 1.01 km (0.63 mi)

The Takiritawai River is a river of the Canterbury region of New Zealand's South Island. A short river of approximately 1.01 kilometres (0.63 mi), it flows from the confluence of the Okana and Okuti Rivers to feed the top of Te Roto o Wairewa/Lake Forsyth, at the southwest of Banks Peninsula. Given the higher normal lake level, and hence shorter length of the river, it can claim to be the shortest river in New Zealand.

== See also ==
- List of rivers of New Zealand
