= Lake Forsyth =

Lake in New Zealand

Lake Forsyth Wairewa
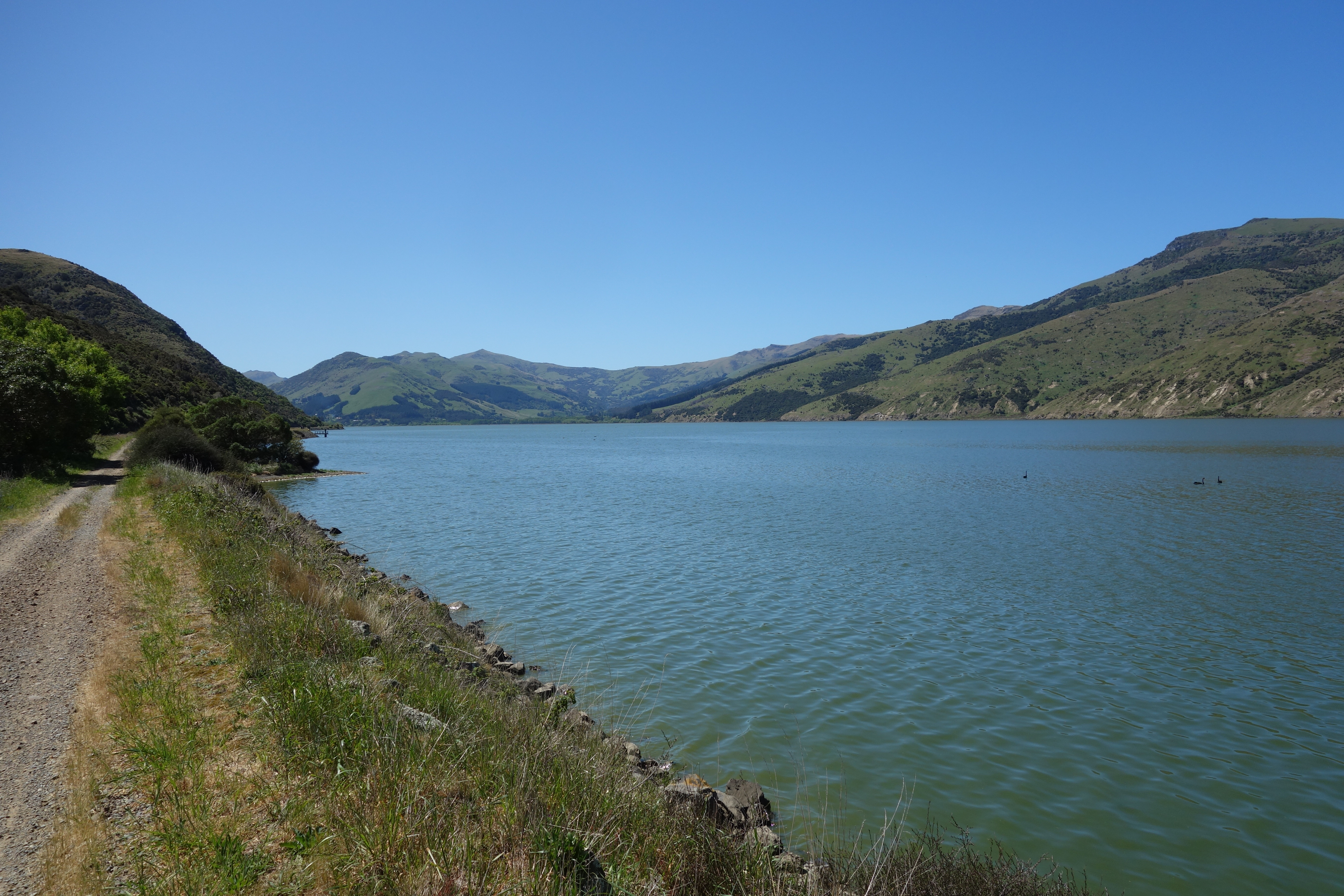
- Lake Forsyth from the Little River Rail Trail

- Location within South Island
- Location: Canterbury, South Island
- Coordinates: 43.8050°S 172.7407°E
- Primary inflows: Takiritawai River
- Primary outflows: Seepage, artificial opening
- Basin countries: New Zealand
- Max. length: 7.6 km (4.7 mi)
- Max. width: 1 km (0.62 mi)
- Surface area: 627.5526 ha (1,550.716 acres)
- Average depth: 1 m (3 ft 3 in)
- Max. depth: 4 m (13 ft)
- Surface elevation: 0 m (0 ft)
- Settlements: Little River

Lake Forsyth (also known as Te Roto o Wairewa) is a lake on the south-western side of Banks Peninsula in the Canterbury region of New Zealand, near the eastern end of the much larger Lake Ellesmere / Te Waihora. State Highway 75 to Akaroa and the Little River Rail Trail run along the north-western side of the lake.

The lake is fed by the Takiritawai River. Its natural discharge into the sea is through a gravel bank at the small community of Birdlings Flat.

Wairewa was an important source of eels as food for the Ngāi Tahu tribe. It is the only Ngāi Tahu customary lake. The Wairewa Rūnanga, one of 18 rūnanga of Ngāi Tahu, are the guardians or kaitiaki of the lake.

Deforestation of the surrounding hills has led to erosion and silting up of the lake. The lake is hypertrophic, leading to eutrophication with corresponding poor water quality. This decline in water quality has been known since the early 1900s. In 2016, after a spell of dry weather, the water quality deteriorated and recurring algal blooms made the water toxic. Animals, including pets and sheep, died after drinking the water.

The Wairewa Rūnanga has created an outlet canal that is occasionally opened to the sea when there is a risk of flooding due to heavy rain. The lake's health has improved since the canal was created. A bridge over the canal was built in 2018. Prior to that, vehicle access across the outlet was restricted for up to weeks at a time whenever the outlet canal was opened to the sea.

== Geography ==
Lake Forsyth is long, narrow and shallow. It has undergone dynamic change over its short lifespan, from bay to estuary to lagoon. Up until a few thousand years ago it was an embayment in the Canterbury Bight, fully exposed to the fury of southerly waves. Over time, a spit of sand and gravel grew, fed by a strong longshore drift. The spit, grew steadily, until it ran into Banks Peninsula and could grow no more, but the sand and sediment kept coming. The spit had become a barrier, now named Kaitorete Spit. It closed off a nearby lake basin from the sea, creating the waituna now known as Lake Ellesmere / Te Waihora.

Within perhaps a further 1000 years, the barrier barred the mouth of the bay turning it into an estuary, where tidal waters could still go in and out. However, the progressive thickening of barrier impounded the estuary, kept the sea out, and it became a lagoon. Freshwater seeped out but sea water couldn't flow it. The opening was navigable by waka canoes and small coastal schooners in the 1860s.

If natural coastal processes were left to operate, Lake Forsyth would eventually become a lake. It is one of many lagoons and estuaries misnamed on New Zealand maps.
