= Kaitorete Spit =

Spit in the Canterbury Region of New Zealand

Coordinates: 43.8278°S 172.5548°E

- Spit
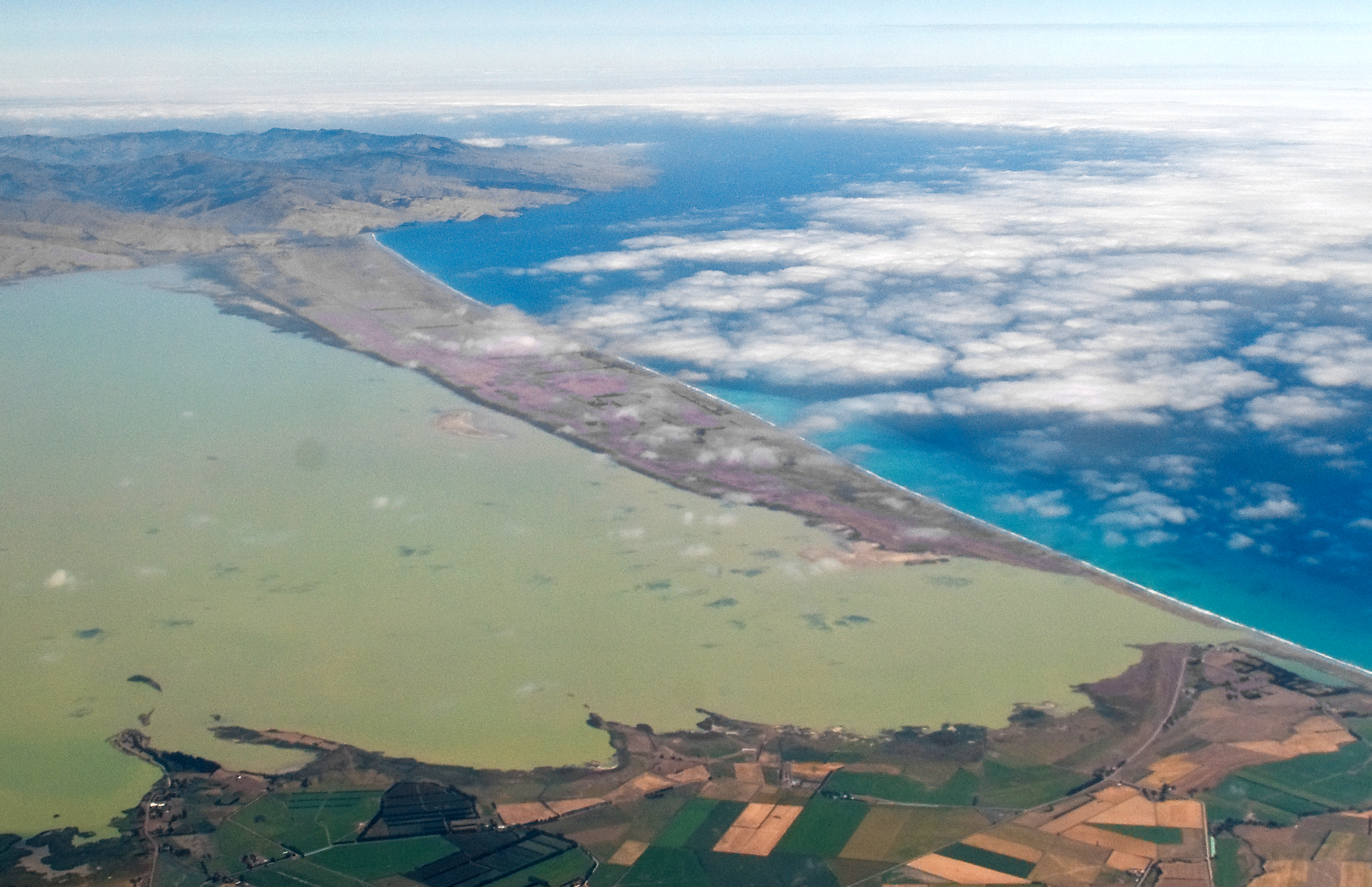
- Kaitorete Spit separating Lake Ellesmere / Te Waihora from the Canterbury Bight
- Interactive map of Kaitorete Spit
- Water bodies: Lake Ellesmere / Te Waihora
- Age: 6,000–8,000 years
- Formed by: gravel outwash

Dimensions
  - Length: 27 km (17 mi)
  - Width: from 200 m to 3.2 km
- Highest elevation: 20 m (66 ft)

Kaitorete Spit is a long finger of land which extends along the coast of Canterbury in the South Island of New Zealand. It runs west from Banks Peninsula for 25 kilometres (16 miles), and separates the shallow Lake Ellesmere / Te Waihora from the Pacific Ocean. It is technically a continuous barrier beach, though at its western end it tapers to a point less than 100 metres in width which is occasionally breached at high tide. The spit is noted for its isolation and for its pebbly beaches. At its eastern end is the small settlement of Birdlings Flat, and west of its narrowest point is the settlement of Taumutu.

== Geography ==
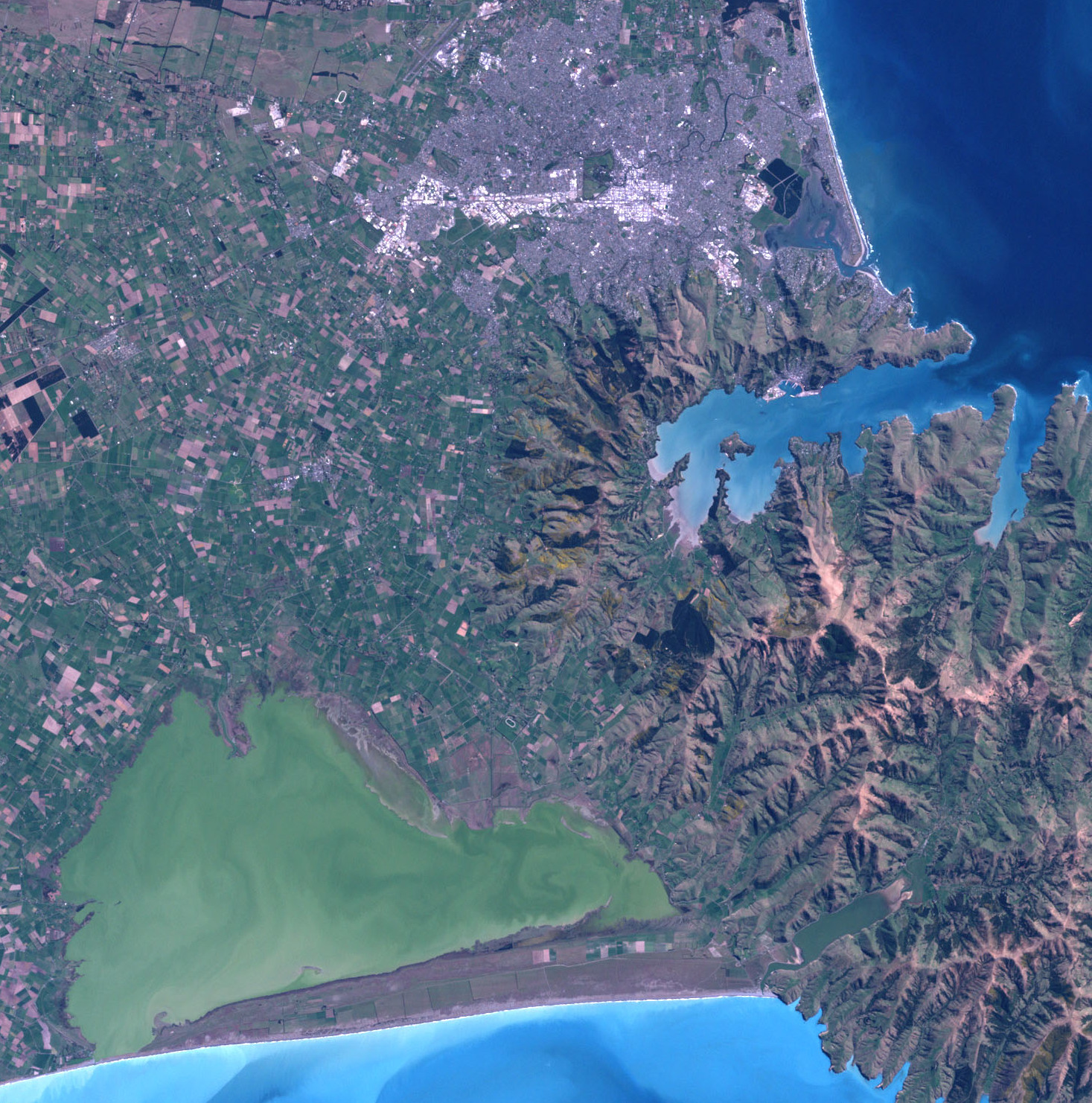
Kaitorete Spit to the south of Lake Ellesmere / Te Waihora, with Christchurch and Lyttelton Harbour to the north

Kaitorete is low-lying but is not prone to flooding. A gravel road extends along half of its length from the small settlement of Birdlings Flat at its easternmost point. At this point, the northern shore of the spit is washed by a tidal lagoon, Kaituna Lagoon, which is essentially a short broad arm of Lake Ellesmere. It is also at its point that the spit is at its widest – some 3.5 kilometres. SH 75 skirts the hills of Banks Peninsula close to the spit's eastern end.

Although usually referred to as a spit, Kaitorete is technically a barrier beach. A spit is widest at the updrift end and tapers to a narrow tip at the downdrift end, but Kaitorete is narrower at the southernmost (updrift) end and widest at the northernmost (downdrift) end. Unlike a spit, it is attached to land at both ends (although somewhat tenuously at its westernmost extremity).

== Origin ==
At the end of the Last Glacial Maximum 20,000 years ago valley glaciers had advanced in Canterbury and glacial outwash rivers delivered vast quantities of sand, gravel, and silt to the coast. The sea level at that time was 130 meters lower than today, and the coast was up to 50 km east of its present-day position; the Canterbury plains were twice their present width. Melting glaciers led to rapid sea level rise which drowned what is now the continental shelf, and shifted the coastline rapidly westward, swallowing the seaward edge of the plains. Ten thousand years ago the Canterbury coastline was approaching the area presently occupied by Lake Ellesmere / Te Waihora. Then, as now, the coast was made of unconsolidated sands and gravels from the fans of major rivers such as the Rakaia and Waimakariri. Powerful southerly waves in the Canterbury Bight rapidly eroded these weakly-resistant sands and gravels, and transported them northwards by longshore drift. This massive supply of sea-borne sediments moving towards Banks Peninsula combined with direct river-borne sediment to create the Kaitorete barrier and enclose what became Lake Ellesmere / Te Waihora.

== Ecology ==
The barrier is of considerable ecological significance and is home to the majority of the surviving specimens of shrubby tororaro (Muehlenbeckia astonii) – a nationally endangered endemic plant. The Kaitorete Spit dune habitat also contains a distinctive moth fauna with naturally rare species. Several species of moth are endemic to Kaitorete Spit including Kiwaia jeanae, Scythris niphozela and Kupea electilis.

== Rocketry ==
In July 2015, aerospace company Rocket Lab announced that it would use Kaitorete Spit as their New Zealand satellite launch site. When the resource consent allowed them only twelve rocket launches per year the company went to Māhia Peninsula in the North Island instead. Kaitorete Spit had previously, in the 1960s, been used by NASA for rocket launches.
