= Birdlings Flat =

Town in Canterbury, New Zealand

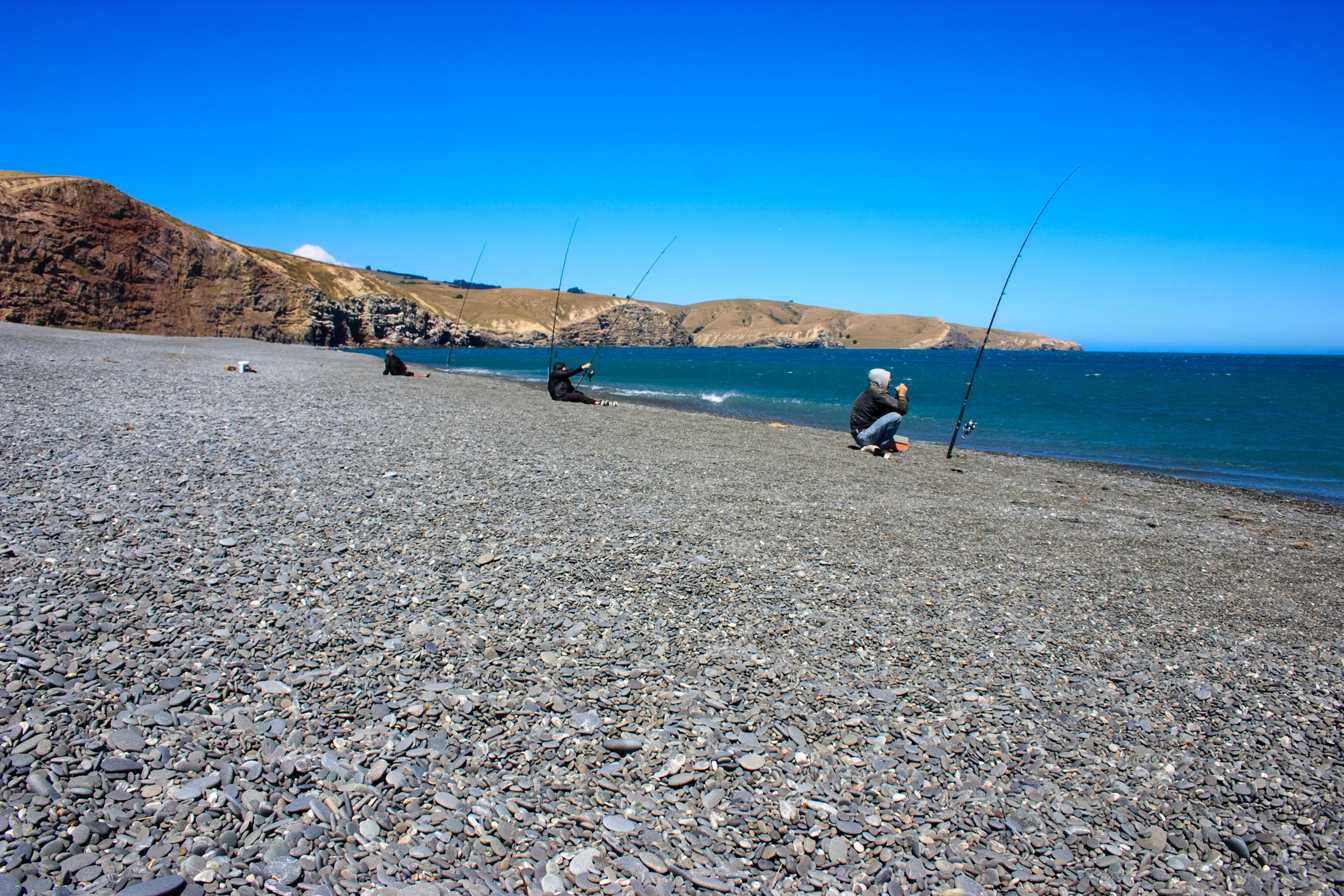
- Fishing at Birdlings Flat

- Rural settlement area within Christchurch City Council boundaries

- Location within South Island Location within New Zealand
- Coordinates: 43.824415°S 172.70575°E
- Country: New Zealand
- Region: Canterbury Region
- District: Christchurch City
- Ward: Banks Peninsula
- Community: Te Pātaka o Rākaihautū Banks Peninsula
- Electorates: Banks Peninsula; Te Tai Tonga (Māori)

Government
  - Territorial Authority: Christchurch City Council
  - Regional council: Environment Canterbury
  - Mayor of Christchurch: Phil Mauger
  - Banks Peninsula MP: Vanessa Weenink
  - Te Tai Tonga MP: Tākuta Ferris

Area
  - Total: 0.44 km^{2} (0.17 sq mi)

Population (June 2025)
  - Total: 240
  - Density: 550/km^{2} (1,400/sq mi)

Birdlings Flat, originally named Te Mata Hapuku, is a settlement in Canterbury, New Zealand, at the eastern end of Kaitorete Spit and the southern end of Lake Forsyth, where the lake discharges to the sea. It is not far from eastern end of Lake Ellesmere / Te Waihora. The name Birdlings Flat is also commonly used for the nearby pebble beach on the ocean side of Kaitorete Spit.

The beach is well known as a place to find small agates and a variety of other attractive rounded pebbles. Due to strong ocean currents, swimming and surfing is not advised. Hector's dolphins live along the beach in notable numbers, and fur seals, whales such as southern right whales, and much more rarely elephant seals cavort and rest there.

== History ==
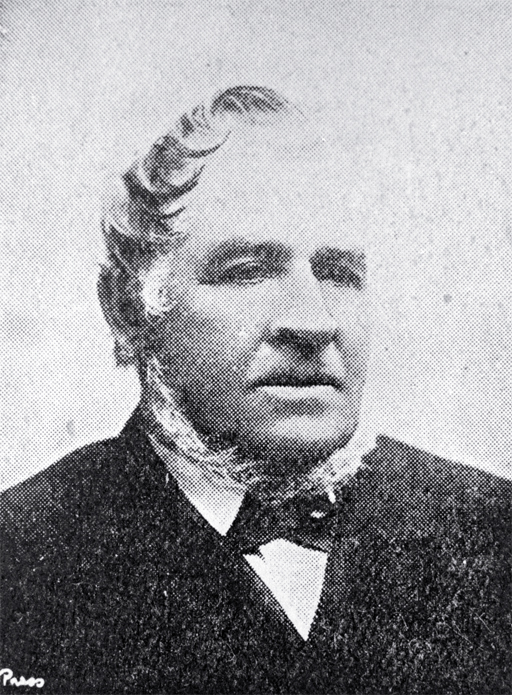
William Birdling (1822–1902)

Birdlings Flat is named after the Birdling family, who were the first European settlers to farm the area. William Birdling was the first member of the Birdling family to arrive in New Zealand. He was employed by George Rhodes in 1843 to come to Banks Peninsula and work as his overseer. William built a house, Waikoko, in the area that was later to bear his name.

On 16 May 1882, a branch line railway was opened to Birdlings Flat from a junction with the Southbridge Branch in Lincoln. This line became known as the Little River Branch, with the extension to Little River opened on 11 March 1886. The railway served Birdlings Flat until its closure on 30 June 1962. The railway's old formation remained well preserved and has now been revitalised into a public walking and cycling track, the Little River Rail Trail.

Birdlings Flat has been used as a launch site for sounding rockets. The University of Canterbury used to have a meteorological research station there.

== Demographics ==
Birdlings Flat is described by Statistics New Zealand as a rural settlement and covers 0.44 km^{2} (0.17 sq mi). It had an estimated population of 240 as of June 2025, with a population density of 545 people per km^{2}. It is part of the Banks Peninsula South statistical area.

Historical population
Year	Pop.	±% p.a.
2006	153	—
2013	150	−0.28%
2018	195	+5.39%
2023	240	+4.24%

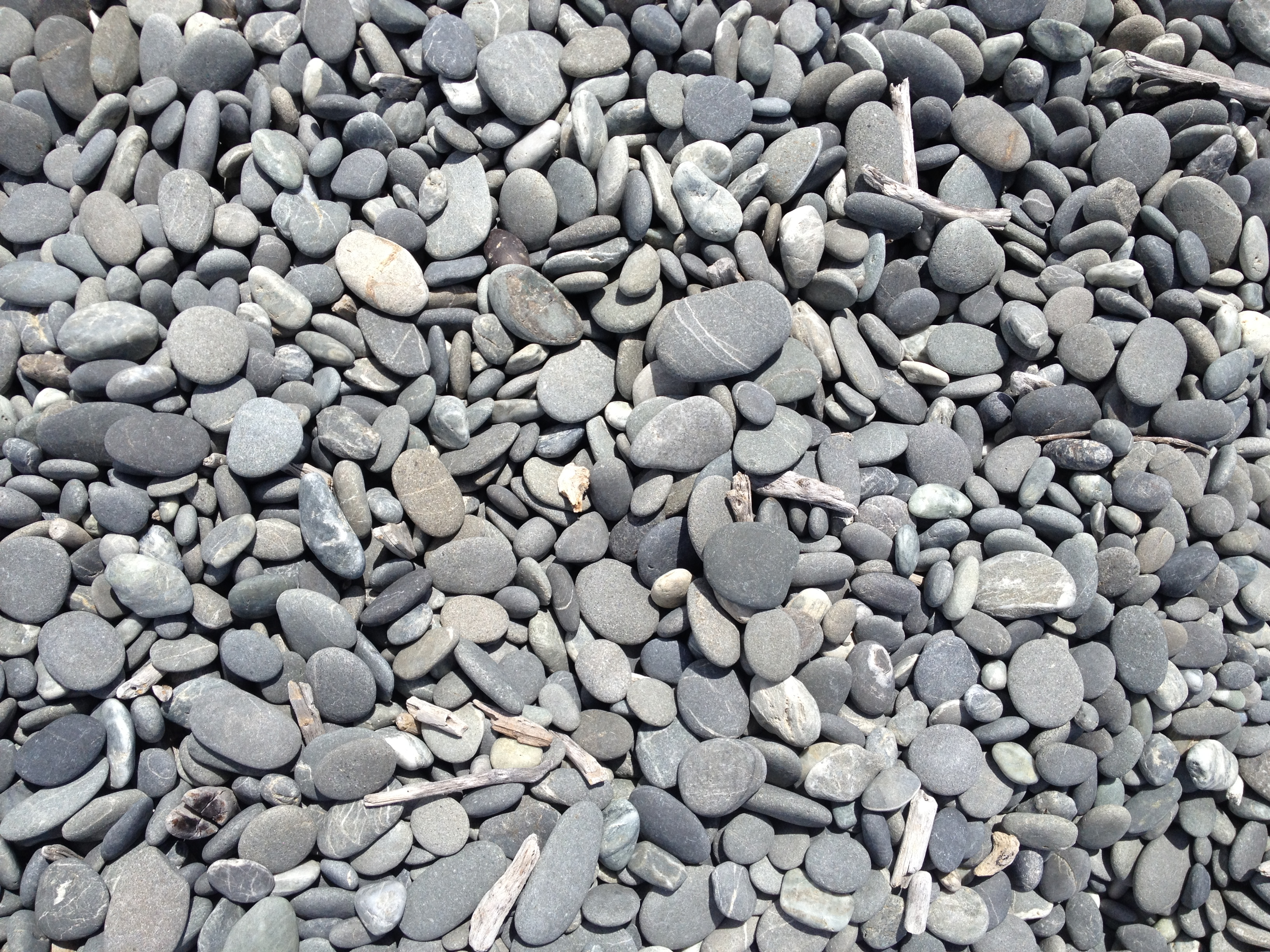
Pebbles at Birdlings Flat

Birdlings Flat had a population of 240 in the 2023 New Zealand census, an increase of 45 people (23.1%) since the 2018 census, and an increase of 90 people (60.0%) since the 2013 census. There were 126 males, 117 females, and 3 people of other genders in 120 dwellings. 5.0% of people identified as LGBTIQ+. The median age was 55.0 years (compared with 38.1 years nationally). There were 24 people (10.0%) aged under 15 years, 21 (8.8%) aged 15 to 29, 138 (57.5%) aged 30 to 64, and 57 (23.8%) aged 65 or older.

People could identify as more than one ethnicity. The results were 85.0% European (Pākehā); 18.8% Māori; 3.8% Asian; 1.2% Middle Eastern, Latin American and African New Zealanders (MELAA); and 7.5% other, which includes people giving their ethnicity as "New Zealander". English was spoken by 98.8%, Māori by 2.5%, and other languages by 11.2%. No language could be spoken by 2.5% (e.g. too young to talk). New Zealand Sign Language was known by 1.2%. The percentage of people born overseas was 23.8, compared with 28.8% nationally.

Religious affiliations were 23.8% Christian, 1.2% Islam, 1.2% Māori religious beliefs, 3.8% New Age, and 5.0% other religions. People who answered that they had no religion were 53.8%, and 12.5% of people did not answer the census question.

Of those at least 15 years old, 42 (19.4%) people had a bachelor's or higher degree, 123 (56.9%) had a post-high school certificate or diploma, and 48 (22.2%) people exclusively held high school qualifications. The median income was $27,500, compared with $41,500 nationally. 15 people (6.9%) earned over $100,000 compared to 12.1% nationally. The employment status of those at least 15 was 93 (43.1%) full-time, 39 (18.1%) part-time, and 9 (4.2%) unemployed.
