= Little River Rail Trail =

Rail trail in New Zealand

Coordinates: 43°46′S 172°47′E

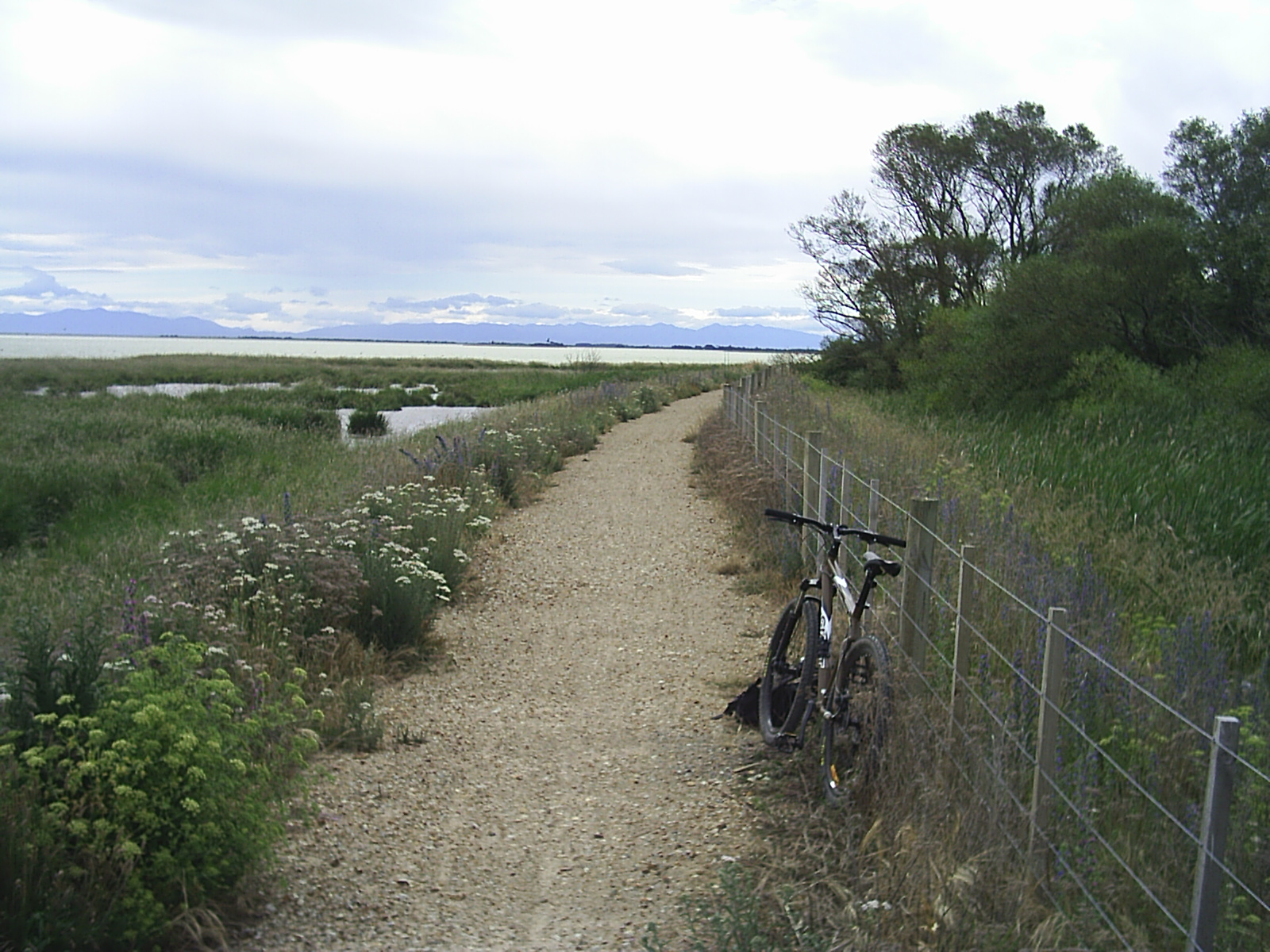
The trail next to Kaituna Lagoon, between Motukarara and Catons Bay.

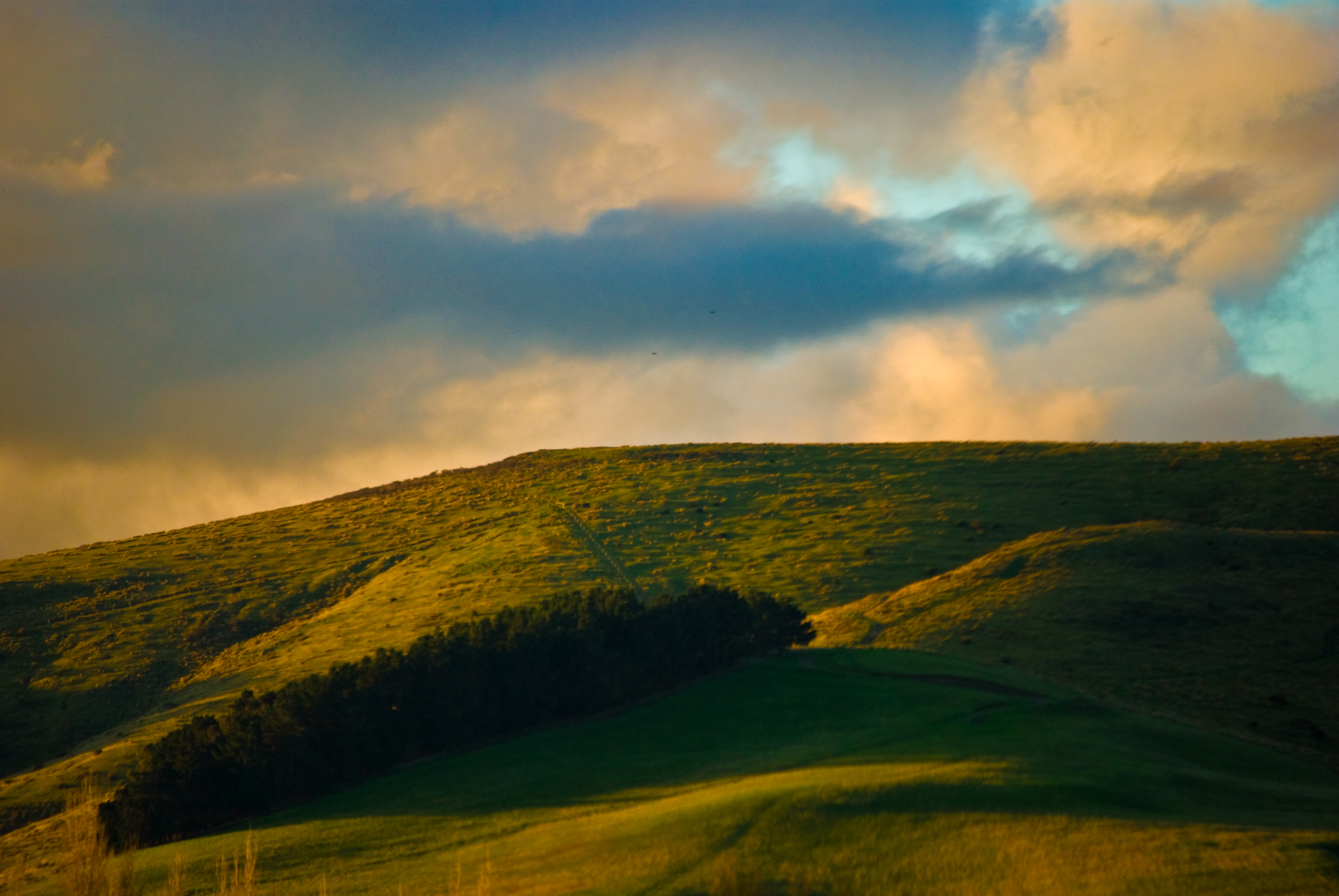
Motukarara, Canterbury, New Zealand.

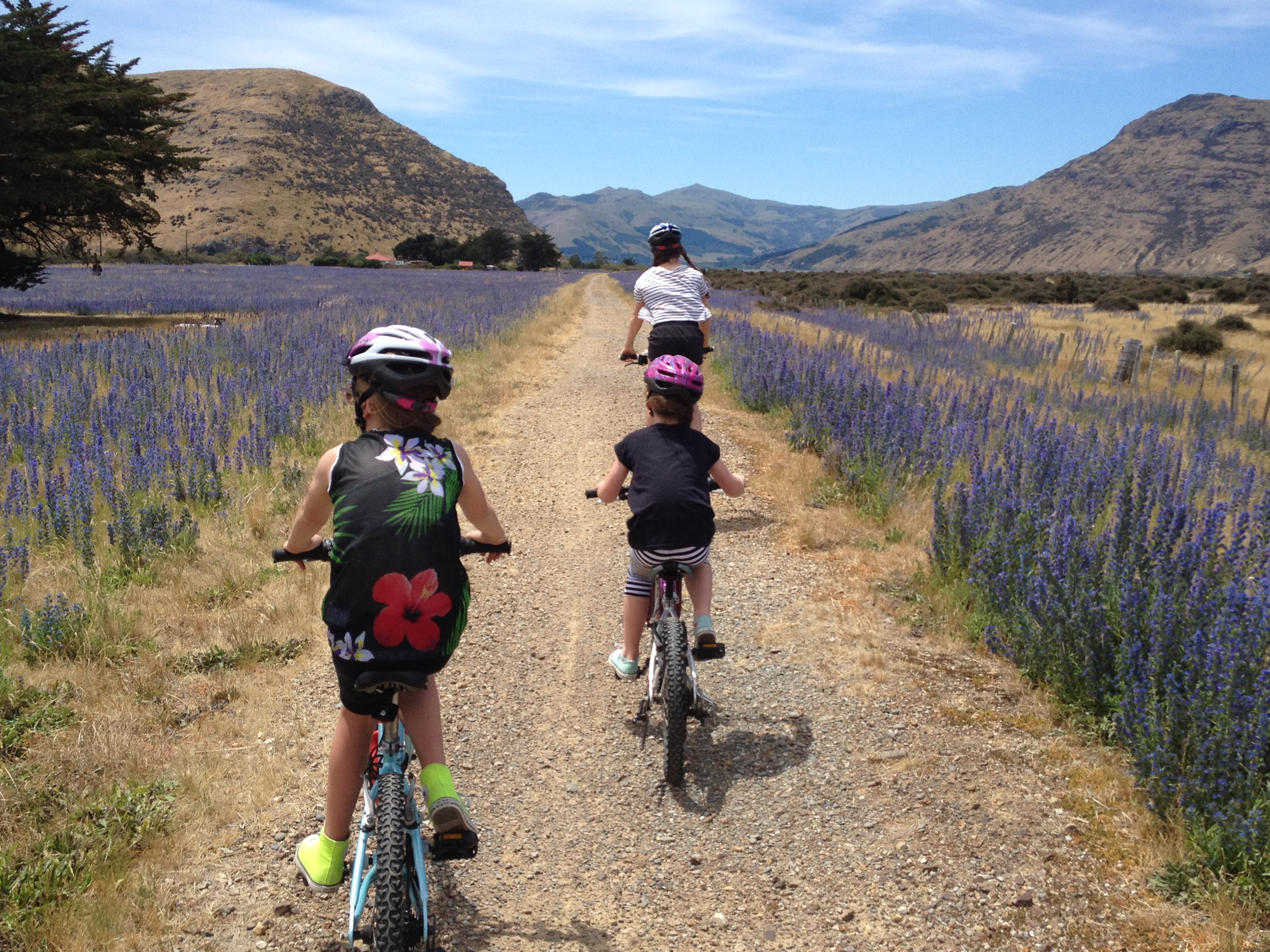
Rail trail bikers enjoying the rail trail from Birdlings Flat to Little River

The Little River Rail Trail is a cycling and walking track on Banks Peninsula in the Canterbury region of New Zealand's South Island.

== Location ==
The rail trail utilises the formation of the Little River Branch railway, which ran from a junction with the Southbridge Branch from Hornby via Lincoln to Little River. The railway closed on 30 June 1962 and the formation had remained largely undisturbed until the early 2000s, when a trust was formed to revitalise it for public use.

== Rail trail history ==
On 28 May 2006 the first section of the rail trail was opened, between Motukarara and Catons Bay Reserve. It has since been extended, first to the Little River hotel, and then to Wairewa Pa Road, some 500 m short of the restored Little River station, which has preserved ex-New Zealand Railways freight wagons and a craft centre.

The second section between Prebbleton and Lincoln (7 km) opened on 30 November 2006. This section is an offroad track adjacent to the old railway line that runs alongside Birchs Road.

The third section between Hornby and Prebbleton (3.6 km) opened on 20 September 2009. This section is an offroad track adjacent to Shands Road and Marshs Road. Between Marshs Road and Springs Road, the track is located within the old railway corridor. This extension thus incorporates part of the also closed Southbridge Branch's formation, as that was the line that linked the Little River Branch to the Main South Line in Hornby.

== Awards ==
The Little River Rail Trail was awarded a Cycle Friendly Award in 2006 for the best cycle facility project in New Zealand by Cycling Advocates' Network.
