= Flemington, Canterbury =

Flemington
- Rural locality
- Interactive map of Flemington
- Coordinates: 44°01′04″S 171°43′46″E
- Country: New Zealand
- Region: Canterbury
- Territorial authority: Ashburton District
- Ward: Eastern

Flemington is a lightly populated locality in the Canterbury region of New Zealand's South Island.

== Geography ==
Flemington is situated on the Canterbury Plains south of Ashburton, between the Ashburton River / Hakatere and Hinds River. Nearby settlements include Eiffelton to the east, Huntingdon to the north, Wheatstone and Ashton to the east on the banks of the Ashburton River / Hakatere, and the ghost town of Waterton to the south on the Pacific Ocean coastline.

== Demographics ==
Flemington is part of the Eiffelton statistical area.

== Education ==
Until 1999, Flemington had its own school. In 2000, it merged with two other local schools and was relocated to the former site of Willowby's school and is now known as Longbeach School.
