= Wheatstone, New Zealand =

Coordinates: 44°01′S 171°45′E

Wheatstone is a locality in the Canterbury region of New Zealand's South Island. It is located on the Canterbury Plains south of Ashburton, on the banks of the Ashburton River / Hakatere. Other nearby settlements include Huntingdon to the north, Eiffelton and Flemington to the west, Ashton and Waterton to the south, and Riverside and Wakanui to the east on the opposite side of the Ashburton River / Hakatere. Wheatstone is slightly inland from the coastline of the Pacific Ocean.
