= List of space debris fall incidents =

List of times that space debris fell to the surface of Earth

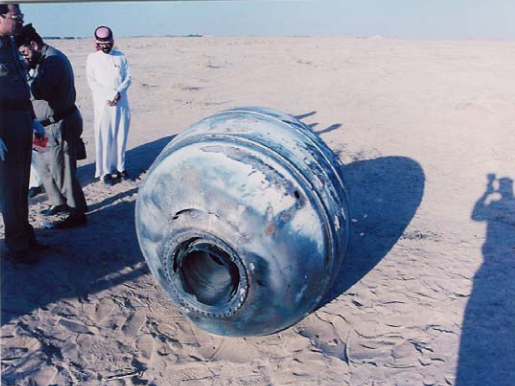
Saudi officials inspect a crashed PAM-D module in January 2001.

Space debris usually burns up in the atmosphere, but larger debris objects can reach the ground intact. According to NASA, an average of one cataloged piece of debris has fallen back to Earth each day for the past 50 years. Despite their size, there has been no significant property damage from the debris. Burning up in the atmosphere may also contribute to atmospheric pollution. Numerous small cylindrical tanks from space objects have been found, designed to hold fuel or gasses.

Notable examples of space debris falling to Earth and impacting human life include:

== 1960s-1990s ==
- 1962: a 20-pound (9.1 kg) portion of the descent module of Korabl-Sputnik 1 landed on a city street in Manitowoc, Wisconsin, United States
- 1969: five sailors on a Japanese ship were injured when space debris from what was believed to be a Soviet spacecraft struck the deck of their boat.
- 1972: the Soviet Venus probe Kosmos 482 failed at launch. Four red-hot 13.6-kilogram (30 lb) titanium alloy spheres, with a diameter of 38 centimetres (15 in), crashed within a 16-kilometre (10 mi) radius of each other just outside Ashburton, New Zealand at 1:00 AM on 3 April 1972. The spheres scorched holes in crops and made deep indentations in the soil, but no one was injured. A similarly shaped object was discovered near Eiffelton, New Zealand, in 1978.
- 1978: the Soviet reconnaissance satellite Kosmos 954 reentered the atmosphere over northwest Canada and scattered radioactive debris over northern Canada, some landing in the Great Slave Lake.
- 1979: portions of Skylab came down over Australia, and several pieces landed in the area around the Shire of Esperance, which fined NASA $400 for littering.
- 1987: a 7-foot (2.1 m) strip of metal from the Soviet Kosmos 1890 rocket landed between two homes in Lakeport, California, causing no damage.
- 1991: Salyut 7 underwent an uncontrolled reentry on 7 February over the city of Capitán Bermúdez in Argentina.
- 1997: an Oklahoma woman, Lottie Williams, was hit, without injury, in the shoulder by a 10 cm × 13 cm (3.9 in × 5.1 in) piece of blackened, woven metallic material confirmed as part of the propellant tank of a Delta II rocket which launched a U.S. Air Force satellite the year before.

== From 2000 ==
- 2001: a Star 48 Payload Assist Module (PAM-D) rocket upper stage re-entered the atmosphere after a "catastrophic orbital decay", crashing in the Saudi Arabian desert. It was identified as the upper-stage rocket for NAVSTAR 32, a GPS satellite launched in 1993.
- 2002: A boy, Wu Jie, became the first person to be injured by direct impact from space debris. He suffered minor injuries after a block of aluminum from spent booster parts - weighing 10 kilograms - struck him while he was outdoors in the Shaanxi province of China.
- 2003: Columbia disaster, large parts of the spacecraft reached the ground and entire equipment systems remained intact. More than 83,000 pieces, along with the remains of six of the seven astronauts, were recovered in an area from three to ten miles around Hemphill in Sabine County, Texas. More pieces were found in a line from west Texas to east Louisiana, with the westernmost piece found in Littlefield, Texas and the easternmost found southwest of Mora, Louisiana. Debris was found in Texas, Arkansas and Louisiana. In a rare case of property damage, a foot-long metal bracket smashed through the roof of a dentist office. NASA warned the public to avoid contact with the debris because of the possible presence of hazardous chemicals. 15 years after the failure, people were still sending in pieces with the most recent, as of February 2018, found in the spring of 2017.
- 2007: airborne debris from a Russian spy satellite was seen by the pilot of a LAN Airlines Airbus A340 carrying 270 passengers whilst flying over the Pacific Ocean between Santiago and Auckland. The debris was reported within 9.3 kilometres (5 nmi) of the aircraft.
- 2016: on 2 November, the upper stage of Vega flight VV01 launched on 13 February 2012 reentered over the Indian state of Tamil Nadu. A composite overwrapped pressure vessel survived reentry and was recovered.
- 2020: The empty core stage of a Chinese Long March-5B rocket made an uncontrolled re-entry - the largest object to do so since the Soviet Union's 39-ton Salyut 7 space station in 1991 – over Africa and the Atlantic Ocean and a 12-meter-long pipe originating from the rocket crashed into the village of Mahounou in Côte d'Ivoire.
- 2021:
  - A Falcon 9 second stage made an uncontrolled re-entry over Washington on March 25, producing a widely seen "light show". SpaceX retrieved a piece of debris, a composite-overwrapped pressure vessel, that landed on a farm in Washington. Another piece of debris, likely a pressure vessel as well, also survived the re-entry and washed up ashore in Oregon.
  - In September, a high-pressure helium bottle weighing 50 kg from the aft end of the Centaur upper stage of an Atlas V rocket (international designator 2019 -094A) was discovered in south-eastern Australia near the town of Yambuk, Victoria.
- 2022:
  - On 2 April, pieces of reentered space debris impacted multiple locations in the Indian state of Maharashtra, the event of reentry being witnessed by many. Recovered debris consisted of metallic ring almost 3 meter in diameter along with at least six composite overwrapped pressure vessels, some bearing the serial number '3CCA301001 B'. The debris is likely from the third stage of the Long March 3B rocket with a Y77 serial, launched in February 2021.
  - A month later on 12 May another incidence of space debris reentry and impact was reported over the Indian state of Gujarat, with surviving debris consisting of metal fragments and at least three composite overwrapped pressure vessels. Allegedly, the falling debris killed a livestock animal and injured another as one metal fragment struck a sheep pen. The debris is likely from the third stage of the Long March 3B rocket with a Y86 serial, launched in September 2021. The Indian space agency ISRO is investigating both incidents.
  - On 9 July 2022, the trunk of the SpaceX Crew-1 Dragon spacecraft reentered the atmosphere and its debris landed on locations such as Albury, Wagga Wagga and Canberra in New South Wales, Australia. Australia notified the United Nations Committee on the Peaceful Uses of Outer Space about three pieces of recovered debris under the Rescue Agreement on 26 August 2022.
  - On 31 July 2022, the empty core stage of Long March-5B made an uncontrolled reentry over Indonesia and Malaysia. The reentry was witnessed by many and later pieces of booster that survived reentry were recovered from multiple locations in Indonesia and Malaysia.
- 2023:
  - On 27 April 2023, space debris bearing a pattern resembling the Chinese national flag as well as a marking of "ventilation duct" in Chinese was found on a beach in Okinoerabu Island, Kagoshima Prefecture, Japan.
  - In May 2023, fragments of reentered space debris fell over parts Kyegegwa, Sembabule, and Kyenjojo districts of Western Uganda including a piece that fell on a roof of house in Nakawala village in the Sembabule. According to a report by National Forensic Sciences University, recovered object was made from specialized alloys and carbon-fiber and could belong to SpaceX.
  - On 16 July 2023, a composite motor case likely to be from the third stage of the Polar Satellite Launch Vehicle was found ashore on the Western Australian coast near Greenhead. The recovered object is now at display in Scitech museum in West Perth, Western Australia.
- 2024:
  - On 8 March 2024, a cylindrical metal object weighing nearly 2 pounds (0.91 kg) struck a house in Naples, Florida causing damage to property. The object was a piece of EP9 battery pallet jettisoned from ISS in 2021 and survived reentry when its orbit decayed.
  - On 28 April 2024, two fragments of space debris bearing scorch marks were found on a farm in Ituna (Saskatchewan, Canada). The larger piece of space debris had carbon fiber composite and honeycomb structure, weighing nearly 100 pounds (45 kg). It was part of the Axiom 3 Dragon trunk section that reentered on 26 February over that region.
  - On 21 May 2024, a fragment of reentered space debris was found in Haywood County (North Carolina, US). The charred object was 4 × 3.5 feet in size, weighed nearly 90 pounds (41 kg) and was composed of carbon fiber dotted with metallic embeds. On the same day about 40 miles (64 km) away, another smaller piece of debris was found in Macon County, NC after it struck a homeowner's roof. Both fragments belonged to the trunk section of the SpaceX Crew-7 Dragon spacecraft which reentered on the same day.
  - On 20 August 2024, a 2.5 kg piece of aluminium was found on the ground in a farm in Saskatchewan, Canada. The fragment was from SpaceX Starlink satellite that reentered following the erroneous Falcon G9-3 deploy.
  - On 30 December 2024, a 500 kg ring with 2.5 meter diameter fell over Mukuku Village of Makueni County at around 15:00 (EAT). The Kenya Space Agency considers the recovered object to be a piece of reentered space debris.
- 2025:
  - On 19 February 2025, a Composite overwrapped pressure vessel and other fragments from SpaceX Falcon-9 second stage survived reentry and impacted a village in Poland causing some damage to property.
  - On 24 March 2025, the trunk of the SpaceX Crew-9 Dragon spacecraft reentered the atmosphere and its debris landed in Erg Chech region of Sahara desert.
  - On 10 May 2025, three to four Composite overwrapped pressure vessels from a reentered space object were found in Armstrong and Cañada de Gómez towns of Santa Fe, Argentina.
  - On 10 May 2025, the Soviet Kosmos 482 Venus descent craft crashed into either Indian Ocean, Europe or Australia on 10 May 2025 at an 6:04 to 7:32 UTC window.
  - On 25 September 2025, A large cylindrical fragment of reentered space debris with 1.2 meter diameter and 1.7 meter length was found in Puerto Tirol (Chaco Province, Argentina). The object was wrapped in carbon fiber and had 40 cm hole on one end. The object was marked with serial number FG-144A/GFFa3-11/S9-2305 and could belong to the Chinese rocket Jielong 3.
  - On 18 October, a suspected piece of space debris consistent with attributes of a Composite overwrapped pressure vessel was found in Pilbara region of Western Australia. The object was in flames when discovered by mine workers. Recovered object could be from reentered upper stage of Chinese rocket Jielong-3.
- 2026
  - On 14 October, a suspected piece of space debris was discovered lying in a cornfield in rural Minnesota. The debris was a large domed cylindrical metallic object, 11 feet (3.4 m) in diameter and is suspected to be from reentered upper-stage of Chinese Zhuque-2E rocket that was launched on 15 September 2026.
  - On 18 October, a spectacular streak of light over Brunei Darussalam and a subsequent sonic boom in Kalimantan, Indonesia, were caused by the uncontrolled atmospheric re-entry of a Chinese Zhuque-2E rocket stage, The following morning, October 19, 2026, workers at a local oil palm plantation discovered a massive, torn sheet of charred space hardware. The impact site was localized to a palm oil plantation in the Sampit area, Kalimantan.

== Extraterrestrial events ==
- 2022: on 4 March, a Long March 3C third stage from the Chang'e 5-T1 mission impacted the Moon in or near the crater Hertzsprung.

Before/after images of the new crater from the Falcon 9 upper stage

- 2026: on 5 August, the upper stage of a Falcon 9 rocket impacted the Moon near the crater Einstein. Several telescopes were directed to observe the impact, and the Very Large Telescope in Chile reported the detection of a plume of sodium and lithium vapor 10 minutes post-impact.
