= Huntingdon, New Zealand =

Huntingdon
- Rural locality
- Interactive map of Huntingdon
- Coordinates: 43°59′10″S 171°44′15″E
- Country: New Zealand
- Region: Canterbury
- Territorial authority: Ashburton District
- Ward: Ashburton

Huntingdon is a lightly populated locality in the Canterbury region of New Zealand's South Island. It is situated on the southern bank of the Ashburton River / Hakatere, south of Ashburton. Other nearby settlements include Willowby to the west, Wheatstone, Flemington, and Ashton to the south, and Wakanui to the east across the river.

== Demographics ==
Huntingdon is part of the Lake Hood rural settlement and the Eiffelton statistical area.

== Economy ==
The primary economic activity in Huntingdon has been agriculture, but the development of a watersports centre and an associated residential subdivision since 1987 has provided diversification.

== Environment ==
Huntingdon is situated on the Canterbury Plains, just inland from the Pacific Ocean. A small lake, Lake Hood, is situated beside the Ashburton River / Hakatere. In 1987, a project to develop Lake Hood was founded, and it is now a significant public water recreation facility surrounded by Huntingdon Park. It hosts kayaking, rowing, and water skiing, augmented by walking trails through surrounding wetland. Residential development has been pursued around this facility, growing the population of Huntingdon.

== Transport ==
Huntingdon is off major transport routes. Both State Highway 1 and the Main South Line railway pass nearby to the northwest, through Tinwald and Winslow.
