= Willowby, New Zealand =

Willowby
- Rural locality
- Interactive map of Willowby
- Coordinates: 43°59′S 171°41′E
- Country: New Zealand
- Region: Canterbury
- Territorial authority: Ashburton District
- Ward: Eastern
- Electorates: Rangitata; Te Tai Tonga (Māori)

Government
  - Territorial authority: Ashburton District Council
  - Regional council: Environment Canterbury
  - Mayor of Ashburton: Liz McMillan
  - Rangitata MP: James Meager
  - Te Tai Tonga MP: Tākuta Ferris

Area
  - Total: 38.28 km^{2} (14.78 sq mi)

Population (2023 census)
  - Total: 354
  - Density: 9.25/km^{2} (24.0/sq mi)

Willowby is a lightly populated locality in the Canterbury region of New Zealand's South Island. It is situated in Mid-Canterbury, south of Ashburton, the major town of the area. Other nearby settlements include Hinds and Lynnford to the southwest, Eiffelton to the south, and Huntingdon to the east.

== Demographics ==
Willowby locality covers 38.28 km^{2} (14.78 sq mi). It is part of the Eiffelton statistical area.

Historical population
| Year | Pop. | ±% p.a. |
|---|---|---|
| 2006 | 306 | — |
| 2013 | 333 | +1.22% |
| 2018 | 348 | +0.89% |
| 2023 | 354 | +0.34% |

Willowby had a population of 354 in the 2023 New Zealand census, an increase of 6 people (1.7%) since the 2018 census, and an increase of 21 people (6.3%) since the 2013 census. There were 177 males and 174 females in 126 dwellings. 2.5% of people identified as LGBTIQ+. There were 69 people (19.5%) aged under 15 years, 54 (15.3%) aged 15 to 29, 159 (44.9%) aged 30 to 64, and 69 (19.5%) aged 65 or older.

People could identify as more than one ethnicity. The results were 90.7% European (Pākehā); 4.2% Māori; 5.1% Asian; 0.8% Middle Eastern, Latin American and African New Zealanders (MELAA); and 3.4% other, which includes people giving their ethnicity as "New Zealander". English was spoken by 97.5%, Māori by 1.7%, and other languages by 5.9%. No language could be spoken by 1.7% (e.g. too young to talk). New Zealand Sign Language was known by 0.8%. The percentage of people born overseas was 13.6, compared with 28.8% nationally.

Religious affiliations were 36.4% Christian, and 0.8% New Age. People who answered that they had no religion were 56.8%, and 4.2% of people did not answer the census question.

Of those at least 15 years old, 48 (16.8%) people had a bachelor's or higher degree, 162 (56.8%) had a post-high school certificate or diploma, and 78 (27.4%) people exclusively held high school qualifications. 33 people (11.6%) earned over $100,000 compared to 12.1% nationally. The employment status of those at least 15 was 162 (56.8%) full-time, 57 (20.0%) part-time, and 3 (1.1%) unemployed.

== Economy ==
The primary economic activity around Willowby is agriculture.

== Education ==
Until 2000, primary education was provided by Willowby School (opened 1876). That year, three local schools merged to form Longbeach School, which is situated at the former site of Willowby School. It caters for students in years 1–8.

== Environment ==
Willowby is located on the Canterbury Plains between the Ashburton River / Hakatere and Rangitata rivers. The Pacific Ocean is a short distance away, with Eiffelton and Waterton between Willowby and the coastline. At the turn of the 21st century, local efforts were improving the quality of Willowby's environment. A barren shingle pit was converted into the Willowby Community Reserve, and other projects have been undertaken with the assistance of local government.

== Religion ==
Willowby formerly had its own Methodist church. It was founded in 1876 and closed in 1992. Its stained glass windows are now at the Baring Square Methodist church in Ashburton, and a tapestry created by a member of Willowby Methodist Church to celebrate its centenary in 1976 was given to Tinwald's Methodist church.

== Services ==
Willowby has its own volunteer rural fire fighting unit. It covers a catchment between the Ashburton and Hinds rivers and was founded to serve the local farming community, especially during dry summers. It has 21 members, and as part of the national rural fire service, it can provide assistance and back-up to other volunteer units in the surrounding region.

== Transport ==
Willowby is situated off major transport routes. State Highway 1 and the Main South Line railway pass nearby, through Winslow to the northwest.
