= Longbeach, New Zealand =

Longbeach
- Rural locality
- Interactive map of Longbeach
- Coordinates: 44°06′S 171°42′E
- Country: New Zealand
- Region: Canterbury
- Territorial authority: Ashburton District
- Ward: Eastern

Longbeach is a lowly populated locality in the Canterbury region of New Zealand's South Island. It is located in a rural area of the Canterbury Plains on the shore of the Pacific Ocean on the northern side of the Hinds River's mouth.

Nearby settlements include Waterton and Eiffelton to the north, and on the other side of the Hinds River, Lowcliffe to the west. The small township of Hinds is to the northwest, while the nearest significantly sized town is Ashburton, further north.

There is a Longbeach School, though it is actually located in nearby Willowby rather than Longbeach. It was formed when three local schools amalgamated in 2000 and caters for students in grades 1 to 8.

In the 1860s, there was a proposal to build the Main South Line railway between Christchurch and Dunedin on a coastal route that would have passed through Longbeach, but this was abandoned in favour of a more inland route through Ashburton that had easier river crossings. However, Longbeach continued to lobby for a railway. In 1878, a proposal was made to extend the Southbridge Branch from Southbridge across the Rakaia River to Longbeach and Waterton. It was primarily intended to serve agricultural interests in the area. Although an appropriate location for a bridge was found, the government never acted on the proposal and it lapsed.

== Historic buildings ==
Several buildings on the Longbeach station are classified as Heritage New Zealand historic places: the two storied brick cookshop, waterwheel, homestead, stables, chapel and cob cottage. The brick buildings were built of bricks manufactured at a steam-powered brickworks at Eiffelton. The original wooden and corrugated iron woolshed was built in the 1880s.

== Demographics ==
Longbeach is part of the Eiffelton statistical area.
