= Ashton, New Zealand =

Ashton
- Rural locality
- Interactive map of Ashton
- Coordinates: 44°02′S 171°46′E
- Country: New Zealand
- Region: Canterbury
- Territorial authority: Ashburton District
- Ward: Eastern
- Electorates: Rangitata; Te Tai Tonga (Māori)

Government
  - Territorial authority: Ashburton District Council
  - Regional council: Environment Canterbury
  - Mayor of Ashburton: Liz McMillan
  - Rangitata MP: James Meager
  - Te Tai Tonga MP: Tākuta Ferris

Area
  - Total: 46.10 km^{2} (17.80 sq mi)

Population (2023 census)
  - Total: 144
  - Density: 3.12/km^{2} (8.09/sq mi)

Ashton is a lightly populated locality in the Canterbury region of New Zealand's South Island. It is situated on the Canterbury Plains south of Ashburton, on the Pacific Ocean coastline. It is on the southern side of the Ashburton River / Hakatere's mouth. Nearby settlements include Huntingdon and Wheatstone to the north, Waterton to the southwest, and across the Ashburton River / Hakatere, Riverside to the northeast.

== Demographics ==
Ashton locality covers 46.10 km^{2} (17.80 sq mi). It is part of the Eiffelton statistical area.

Historical population
Year	Pop.	±% p.a.
2006	75	—
2013	108	+5.35%
2018	135	+4.56%
2023	144	+1.30%
The 2006 population is for a smaller area of 39.92 km^{2}. Source:

The locality had a population of 144 in the 2023 New Zealand census, an increase of 9 people (6.7%) since the 2018 census, and an increase of 36 people (33.3%) since the 2013 census. There were 72 males and 72 females in 42 dwellings. The median age was 33.8 years (compared with 38.1 years nationally). There were 39 people (27.1%) aged under 15 years, 24 (16.7%) aged 15 to 29, 66 (45.8%) aged 30 to 64, and 18 (12.5%) aged 65 or older.

People could identify as more than one ethnicity. The results were 95.8% European (Pākehā); 4.2% Māori; and 2.1% Middle Eastern, Latin American and African New Zealanders (MELAA). English was spoken by 97.9%, Samoan by 2.1%, and other languages by 4.2%. No language could be spoken by 2.1% (e.g. too young to talk). The percentage of people born overseas was 8.3, compared with 28.8% nationally.

The sole religious affiliation given was 31.2% Christian. People who answered that they had no religion were 64.6%, and 4.2% of people did not answer the census question.

Of those at least 15 years old, 21 (20.0%) people had a bachelor's or higher degree, 60 (57.1%) had a post-high school certificate or diploma, and 24 (22.9%) people exclusively held high school qualifications. The median income was $50,400, compared with $41,500 nationally. 9 people (8.6%) earned over $100,000 compared to 12.1% nationally. The employment status of those at least 15 was 69 (65.7%) full-time, 15 (14.3%) part-time, and 3 (2.9%) unemployed.
