= Waterton, New Zealand =

Coordinates: 44°04′S 171°45′E

Waterton is a former town in the Canterbury region of New Zealand's South Island. It is still officially recognised as a locality.

== Geography ==
Waterton is located on the Canterbury Plains south of Ashburton on the Pacific Ocean, between the Ashburton River / Hakatere and Hinds River. Nearby localities include Ashton and Wheatstone to the northeast, Flemington to the north, Eiffelton to the northwest and Longbeach to the southwest.

== History ==
Waterton was founded in the second half of the 19th century as the Canterbury Plains were settled by European immigrants. By 1888, it had its own town hall. Catholics in the area of Longbeach and Waterton complained to the administration of the Ashburton parish that Mass had not been said in their area. Accordingly, Mass was held in the Waterton Hall, with an attendance of 60; it later was held in Eiffelton rather than Waterton.

At its height, Waterton was a service town for the immediately surrounding rural area. It was home to 235 people and had amenities such as a general store, post office, public library, hotel, and school. Economic activity was related to agriculture, with an abattoir and a flour mill both located in the town. However, during the later half of the 20th century, Waterton severely declined.

== Today ==
Waterton is effectively a ghost town. In the early 2000s, the land titles of the town's former lots were amalgamated by the owner and then divided into four new "lifestyle blocks" for development. The new owners appealed to the Ashburton District Council to revoke the designation of the town's former streets, which by that stage were merely unformed roads, so that they could be merged into the new properties. In August 2006, the Council granted this request and stopped the roads.

Few remnants of Waterton are now left apart from the remains of the town hall, and the local cemetery is not far from the site of the township. An Anglican church once located in Waterton has been transferred to the Plains Vintage Railway in Tinwald.
