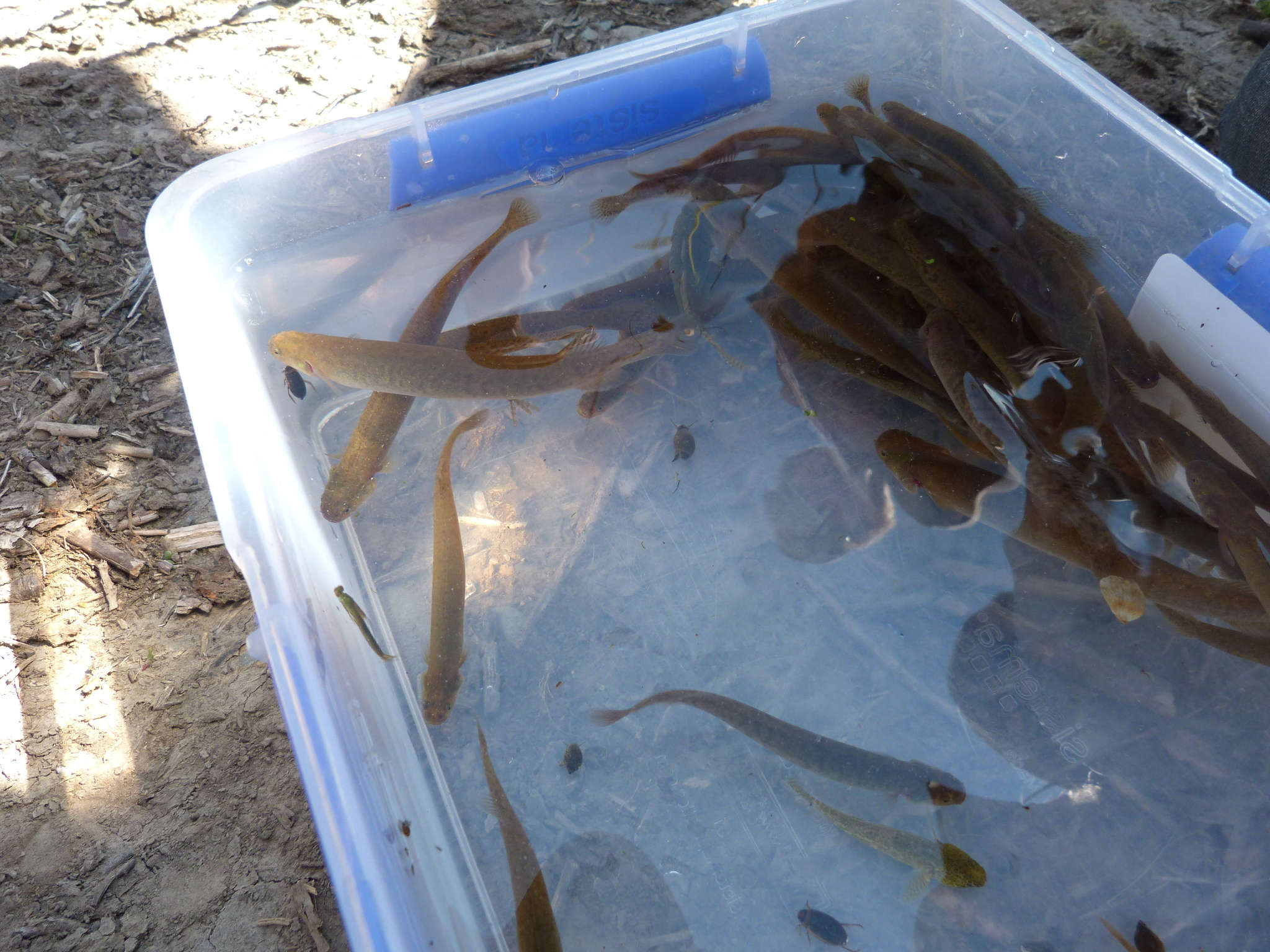

Conservation status
- Critically Endangered (IUCN 3.1)

- Nationally Critical (NZ TCS)

Scientific classification
- Kingdom: Animalia
- Phylum: Chordata
- Class: Actinopterygii
- Division: Teleostei
- Order: Galaxiiformes
- Family: Galaxiidae
- Genus: Neochanna
- Species: N. burrowsius

Binomial name
- Neochanna burrowsius (Phillipps, 1926)
- Approximate known distribution of the Canterbury mudfish on a map of the South Island

= Canterbury mudfish =

Species of fish

The Canterbury mudfish (Neochanna burrowsius), also known as the kowaro, is found only on the Canterbury Plains in New Zealand. Like other Neochanna species, it is a small, tubular and flexible fish which lacks scales. They are able to survive out of water in damp refuges if its wetland habitat dries out periodically over summer.

The first Canterbury mudfish was described by W J Phillipps in 1926, from a specimen sent to him by A Burrows, a farmer from Oxford, North Canterbury. They were sent to him "alive in a tin box together with a quantity of damp earth, sent by parcel-post on a journey lasting over thirty hours, and arrived alive and extremely active." Although Burrows reported that he had found the fish aestivating in holes in the bank, the mudfish is named after the farmer rather than burrowing behaviour.

== Description ==
The Canterbury mudfish is tubular and flexible, with small but fleshy fins. The head is small and blunt, with small eyes and mouth and small tubular nostrils. Like the Chatham mudfish, the Canterbury mudfish retains very small pelvic fins, which are absent in the other three mainland New Zealand Neochanna. The pelvic fins only have 4 or 5 rays, rather than the 7 rays standard in other Galaxiidae. Adults often grow to 120 mm (4.7 in) total length, with a maximum of at least 150 mm (5.9 in).

They are light brown or milky brown, with darker speckles that extend onto the fleshy flanges on the rear fins. Sometimes they have small gold flecks.

== Distribution ==
Canterbury mudfish are found from just north of Christchurch south to the Waitaki River. They currently occupy springs, water races, and drains, but previously would have inhabited the abundant wetlands of the Canterbury Plains, before these were drained for farming.

== Aestivation ==
It has been known since it was first described that this fish could survive long after its habitat had dried up. The species initially drew the attention of Mr Burrows when it reappeared every spring in a creek that was dry over summer. When digging in the banks he uncovered fish within "holes shaped like a coconut in which the fish hid, each with a small entrance. The holes were very smooth inside, and could hold water for a long time if the entrance was carefully closed from the inside". Under experimental conditions, Canterbury mudfish have survived for 85 days out of water, with a 40% death rate over this period.

As their wetland habitat dries out, the water may become stagnant and low in oxygen. When the dissolved oxygen saturation of the water reaches 15–30% Canterbury mudfish begin 'air-breathing', in which they take a bubble of air into the mouth and absorb oxygen from it. While doing this they cease gill ventilation, suggesting that the oxygen is being absorbed directly into their oral tissues rather than being used to oxygenate water flowing over the gills. During this time the mudfish stay very quiet, either hanging at the surface or burrowing into the substrate. Some choose to leave the water when it becomes low in oxygen, and remove themselves again if put back into the water.

When the water dries out completely, Canterbury mudfish continue extracting oxygen from mouthfuls of air as well as absorbing it through their skin. Although their metabolism slows down, they remain active, frequently changing position, rolling onto their backs and grouping together. Maintaining awareness of their surroundings, rather than going into a deep torpor like many hibernating animals, allows them to respond to their changing habitat and move to damper places.

== Life cycle ==
Canterbury mudfish spawn in late winter and spring. The small eggs are scattered amongst dense aquatic vegetation near the surface of the water. They can delay spawning if suitable water quality of submerged vegetation is not present. The 5–7 mm (3/16–1/4 in) fry hatch two to three weeks later. They are initially active during the day in open water, then around 35–50 mm (1.4–2.0 in) they adopt adult habits and become nocturnal and spending much of their time hidden. They grow quickly in their first year, typically reaching 75–80 mm (3.0–3.1 in) but growth slows after this. Sexual maturity is reached in their first year and females spawn once per year, producing 500–10,000 eggs.

== Conservation status ==
In 2014 the New Zealand Department of Conservation classified the Canterbury mudfish as "At Risk: Nationally Critical" with the qualifier C, predicted decline of greater than 70% over ten years. Also in 2014 the IUCN rated the Canterbury mudfish as "Critically endangered".

The Canterbury mudfish is range restricted and sparse, and its preservation is dependent on conservation efforts. Water abstraction, intensification of agriculture and changes in irrigation systems are main causes of their decline.

== Conservation efforts ==
A release of Canterbury mudfish has been carried out in a protected wetland near Willowby, south of Ashburton, New Zealand, where it is hoped they will survive and reproduce. In May 2010, 90 young fish were released into Travis Wetland in the city of Christchurch in the hope that they would become established.
