= Stour River =

Coordinates: 43°39′S 171°16′E

Location
- Country: New Zealand

Physical characteristics
- Mouth
  - location: South Branch Ashburton River / Hakatere
- Length: 20 km (12 mi)

The Stour River is a river of the Canterbury region of New Zealand's South Island. It rises in two main branches, the East Branch and West Branch, to the southeast of Lake Heron, flowing generally south to meet the south branch of the Ashburton River / Hakatere 15 kilometres (9 mi) west of the settlement of Mount Somers.

== See also ==
- List of rivers of New Zealand
