= Swift River (New Zealand) =

Coordinates: 43°30′S 171°26′E

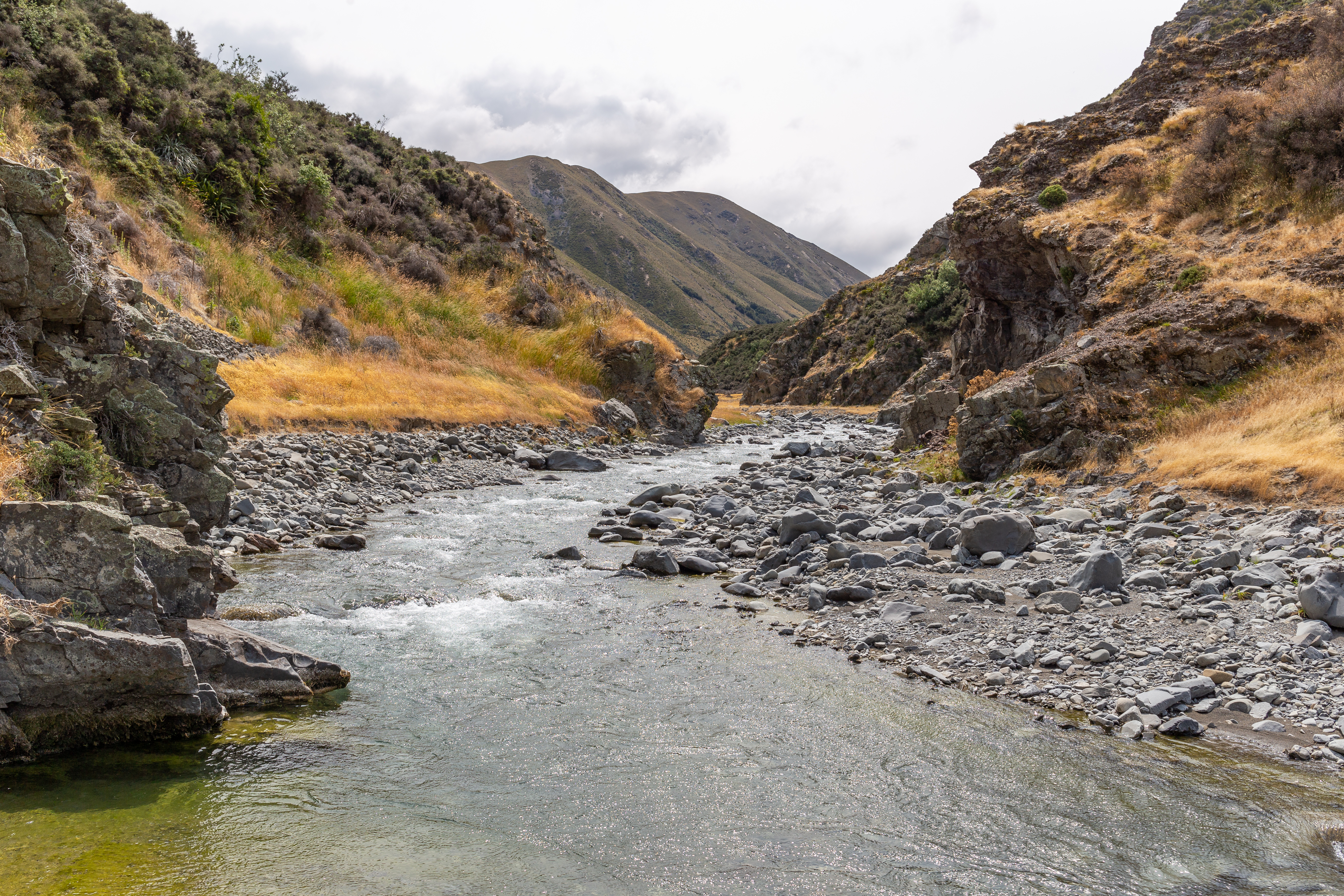

Location
- Country: New Zealand

Physical characteristics
- Mouth
  - location: North Branch Ashburton River / Hakatere
- Length: 12 km (7.5 mi)

The Swift River is a river of the Canterbury region of New Zealand's South Island. It flows south through a valley between the Black Hill and Mount Hutt Ranges to reach the north branch of the Ashburton River / Hakatere 25 kilometres (16 mi) northwest of Methven.

== See also ==
- List of rivers of New Zealand
