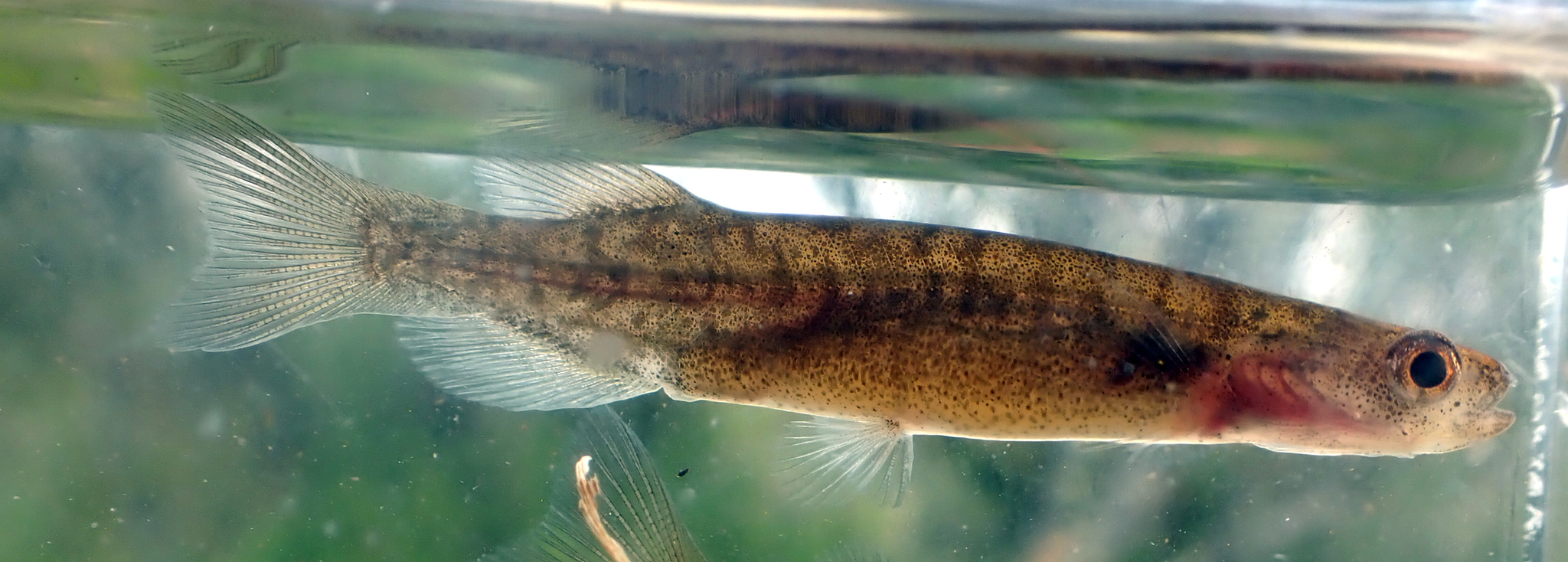

Conservation status
- Least Concern (IUCN 3.1)

- Naturally Uncommon (NZ TCS)

Scientific classification
- Kingdom: Animalia
- Phylum: Chordata
- Class: Actinopterygii
- Order: Galaxiiformes
- Family: Galaxiidae
- Genus: Neochanna
- Species: N. rekohua

Binomial name
- Neochanna rekohua (C. P. Mitchell, 1995)
- Approximate known distribution of the Chatham mudfish on a map of the Chatham Islands

= Chatham mudfish =

Species of ray-finned fish

The Chatham mudfish (Neochanna rekohua), formerly known as the Chathams galaxias (Galaxias rekohua), is a galaxiid fish endemic to two small, peaty lakes in southern Chatham Island, New Zealand.

It was discovered in 1994 by Charles P. Mitchell, who initially placed it in the genus Galaxias, and gave it the species name rekohua after the Moriori word for the Chatham Islands. In 2004, R.M. McDowall reassigned it to Neochanna based on its external anatomy, behaviour, and skeleton, and this was subsequently supported by a genetic analysis.

The Chatham mudfish is the most Galaxias-like of all the mudfishes, with a short body and small pelvic fins, and is closely related to the Canterbury mudfish. Neochanna rekohua averages 75 mm (3.0 in) (though the largest individuals can reach 175 mm (6.9 in), and is a dark mottled brown. It only lives on the edges of a few peaty lakes amongst submerged wood, so is naturally uncommon, but abundant in the few spots where it occurs.

As of 2014, the IUCN indicated that the Chatham mudfish was a least-concern species. In 2025 this species was classified under the New Zealand Threat Classification System as being "At Risk" and having a conservation status of "Naturally Uncommon".
