= Lake Hood =

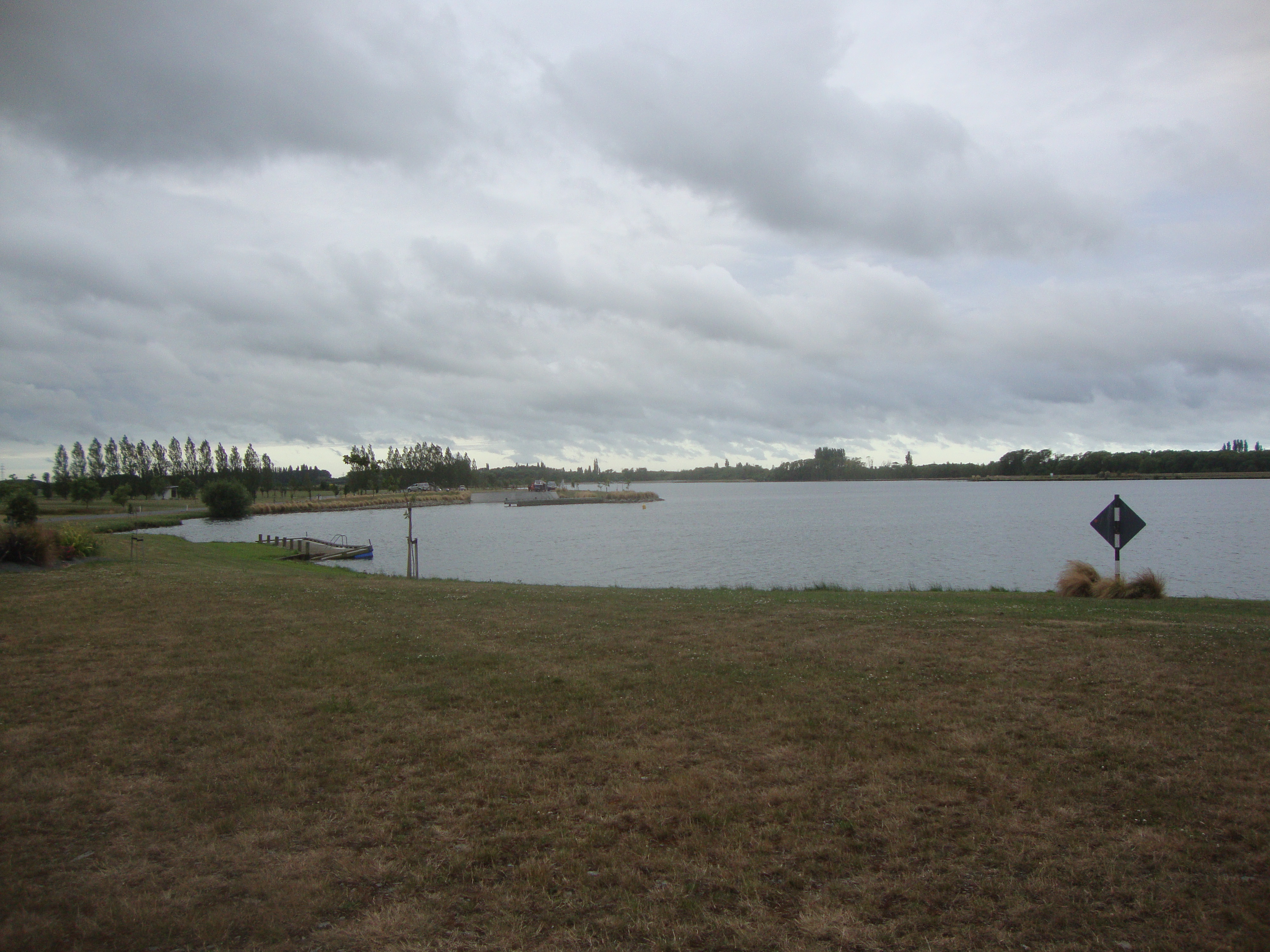
- Lake Hood in 2012

- Location within South Island
- Location: Canterbury, South Island
- Coordinates: 43.9678°S 171.7716°E
- Type: artificial lake
- Basin countries: New Zealand
- Max. length: 2.3 km (1.4 mi)
- Max. width: 1 km (0.62 mi)
- Surface area: 80 hectares (0.80 km^{2})

Lake Hood is a man-made recreational lake, located 6 km south-east of Tinwald in the locality of Huntingdon, Canterbury, New Zealand. It was opened in 2001 by the Right Honourable Jenny Shipley. It is 2.3 km long by 1 km wide and is more than 80 hectares (0.80 km^{2}) in area. It features an eight lane rowing course and separate waterskiing and jet skiing areas, and is home to Water Ski Lake Hood. It is increasing in popularity for rowing, as it is not as susceptible to wind as the main South Island rowing venue, Lake Ruataniwha.

== Water quality ==
On 3 April 2025, the Ashburton District Council closed the lake until further notice for public health reasons, after two people were poisoned by toxic algae in the water. The council commissioned research into the factors that lead to growth of cyanobacteria in the lake, and said "It’s a complex issue, and there is no silver bullet". Testing showed that levels of toxic algae had dropped significantly by 6 May, but the lake remained closed.

== Housing subdivision ==
A substantial housing subdivision, serving as a satellite suburb of Ashburton has been built surrounding the lake. The area is described as a rural settlement by Statistics New Zealand. It covers 1.65 km^{2} (0.64 sq mi) and had an estimated population of 520 as of June 2025, with a population density of 315 people per km^{2}. The settlement is part of the larger Eiffelton statistical area.

Historical population
Year	Pop.	±% p.a.
2006	72	—
2013	213	+16.76%
2018	366	+11.43%
2023	450	+4.22%
The 2006 population is for a larger area of 12.64 km^{2}. Source:

Lake Hood had a population of 450 in the 2023 New Zealand census, an increase of 84 people (23.0%) since the 2018 census, and an increase of 237 people (111.3%) since the 2013 census. There were 222 males and 225 females in 168 dwellings. 2.0% of people identified as LGBTIQ+. The median age was 47.8 years (compared with 38.1 years nationally). There were 81 people (18.0%) aged under 15 years, 60 (13.3%) aged 15 to 29, 216 (48.0%) aged 30 to 64, and 96 (21.3%) aged 65 or older.

People could identify as more than one ethnicity. The results were 95.3% European (Pākehā); 5.3% Māori; 1.3% Pasifika; 2.7% Asian; 0.7% Middle Eastern, Latin American and African New Zealanders (MELAA); and 2.7% other, which includes people giving their ethnicity as "New Zealander". English was spoken by 98.0%, and other languages by 4.0%. No language could be spoken by 1.3% (e.g. too young to talk). New Zealand Sign Language was known by 0.7%. The percentage of people born overseas was 12.7, compared with 28.8% nationally.

The sole religious affiliation given was 40.7% Christian. People who answered that they had no religion were 53.3%, and 5.3% of people did not answer the census question.

Of those at least 15 years old, 90 (24.4%) people had a bachelor's or higher degree, 228 (61.8%) had a post-high school certificate or diploma, and 54 (14.6%) people exclusively held high school qualifications. The median income was $61,000, compared with $41,500 nationally. 90 people (24.4%) earned over $100,000 compared to 12.1% nationally. The employment status of those at least 15 was 192 (52.0%) full-time and 72 (19.5%) part-time.
