= Eiffelton =

- Rural locality
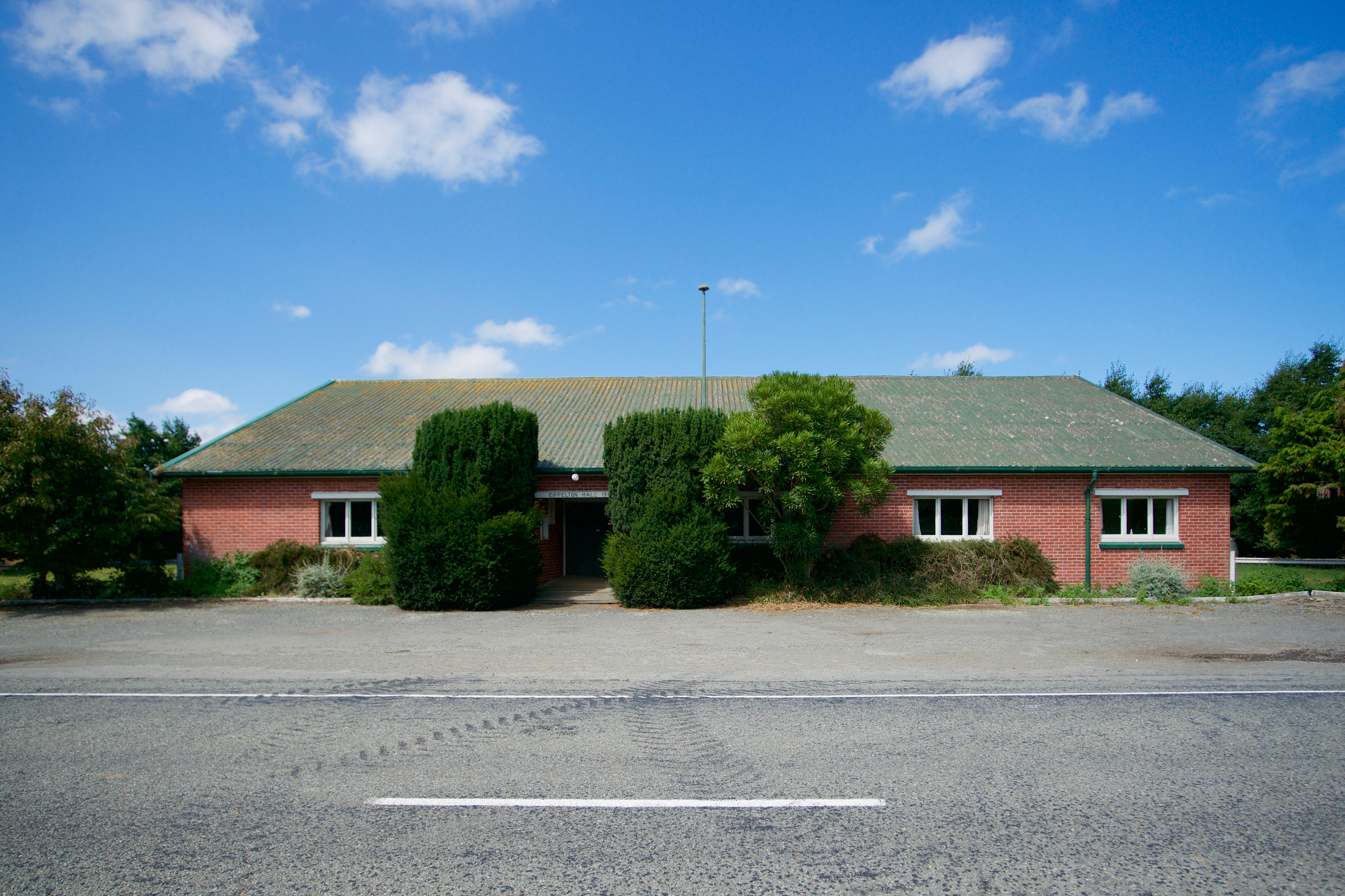
- Eiffelton Hall
- Interactive map of Eiffelton
- Coordinates: 44°02′S 171°41′E
- Country: New Zealand
- Region: Canterbury
- Territorial authority: Ashburton District
- Ward: Eastern
- Electorates: Rangitata; Te Tai Tonga (Māori)

Government
  - Territorial authority: Ashburton District Council
  - Regional council: Environment Canterbury
  - Mayor of Ashburton: Liz McMillan
  - Rangitata MP: James Meager
  - Te Tai Tonga MP: Mananui Ramsden

Area
  - Total: 121.83 km^{2} (47.04 sq mi)

Population (2023 census)
  - Total: 447
  - Density: 3.67/km^{2} (9.50/sq mi)

Eiffelton is a lightly populated locality in the Mid-Canterbury region of New Zealand's South Island.

== Geography ==
Eiffelton is situated on the Canterbury Plains near the Hinds River, which reaches the Pacific Ocean in nearby Longbeach. The small township of Hinds is to Eiffelton's west. Other nearby settlements include Lynnford between Eiffelton and Hinds, Willowby to the north, and Flemington and the ghost town of Waterton to the east. The closest town of significant size is Ashburton to the north.

== Ashburton balls ==
Eiffelton's major claim to fame is that in 1978, it was the site of the discovery of an object similar to the Ashburton balls six years after the original balls were found. The balls were pieces of space debris from the failed Russian space vessel Cosmos 482.

== Religion ==
Eiffelton once had a Catholic church. Mass was first said in the area in 1888 in Waterton's town hall, but it was subsequently held in Eiffelton at either the school or the town hall. On 4 June 1961, a proper church was built, the Church of St Thomas More, and 300 people gathered for its formal opening. It seated 80 for regular services, but declining attendance meant that Mass was held only monthly in the early 1970s. It closed on 7 November 1976, with the altar taken to a church in Hinds and the church's building moved to a nearby site to be used by local scouts.

== Services ==
Eiffelton has a town hall and formerly had a primary school. As of 2000, it merged with two other nearby schools and relocated to a site in Willowby. It also had a play centre for children under primary school age, but between 2001 and 2005, the play centre also relocated to Willowby.

== Transport ==
Eiffelton is not located on major transport routes. It is not far from State Highway 1 and the Main South Line railway, which both pass through Hinds.

== Demographics ==
Eiffelton locality, which includes Lynnford, Longbeach and Waterton, covers 121.83 km^{2} (47.04 sq mi). It is part of the Eiffelton statistical area.

Historical population for Eiffelton locality
Year	Pop.	±% p.a.
2006	384	—
2013	408	+0.87%
2018	444	+1.71%
2023	447	+0.13%

The locality had a population of 447 in the 2023 New Zealand census, an increase of 3 people (0.7%) since the 2018 census, and an increase of 39 people (9.6%) since the 2013 census. There were 237 males and 210 females in 168 dwellings. 2.7% of people identified as LGBTIQ+. There were 114 people (25.5%) aged under 15 years, 75 (16.8%) aged 15 to 29, 225 (50.3%) aged 30 to 64, and 36 (8.1%) aged 65 or older.

People could identify as more than one ethnicity. The results were 83.2% European (Pākehā); 6.0% Māori; 10.7% Asian; 3.4% Middle Eastern, Latin American and African New Zealanders (MELAA); and 5.4% other, which includes people giving their ethnicity as "New Zealander". English was spoken by 96.0%, Māori by 0.7%, and other languages by 8.7%. No language could be spoken by 3.4% (e.g. too young to talk). New Zealand Sign Language was known by 0.7%. The percentage of people born overseas was 18.1, compared with 28.8% nationally.

Religious affiliations were 29.5% Christian, 1.3% Hindu, 0.7% Buddhist, and 2.7% other religions. People who answered that they had no religion were 61.7%, and 4.7% of people did not answer the census question.

Of those at least 15 years old, 72 (21.6%) people had a bachelor's or higher degree, 198 (59.5%) had a post-high school certificate or diploma, and 81 (24.3%) people exclusively held high school qualifications. 30 people (9.0%) earned over $100,000 compared to 12.1% nationally. The employment status of those at least 15 was 219 (65.8%) full-time and 63 (18.9%) part-time.

=== Eiffelton statistical area ===
The Eiffelton statistical area, which also includes Ashton, Flemington, Huntingdon, Lake Hood and Willowby, covers 433.58 km^{2} (167.41 sq mi). It had an estimated population of 2,740 as of June 2025, with a population density of 6.3 people per km^{2}.

Historical population for the statistical area
Year	Pop.	±% p.a.
2006	1,788	—
2013	2,226	+3.18%
2018	2,466	+2.07%
2023	2,601	+1.07%

Eiffelton statistical area had a population of 2,601 in the 2023 New Zealand census, an increase of 135 people (5.5%) since the 2018 census, and an increase of 375 people (16.8%) since the 2013 census. There were 1,353 males, 1,242 females, and 3 people of other genders in 954 dwellings. 1.8% of people identified as LGBTIQ+. The median age was 39.4 years (compared with 38.1 years nationally). There were 573 people (22.0%) aged under 15 years, 390 (15.0%) aged 15 to 29, 1,230 (47.3%) aged 30 to 64, and 405 (15.6%) aged 65 or older.

People could identify as more than one ethnicity. The results were 85.5% European (Pākehā); 6.2% Māori; 1.4% Pasifika; 8.5% Asian; 1.6% Middle Eastern, Latin American and African New Zealanders (MELAA); and 4.2% other, which includes people giving their ethnicity as "New Zealander". English was spoken by 97.3%, Māori by 1.3%, Samoan by 0.5%, and other languages by 8.0%. No language could be spoken by 2.2% (e.g. too young to talk). New Zealand Sign Language was known by 0.3%. The percentage of people born overseas was 16.8, compared with 28.8% nationally.

Religious affiliations were 37.3% Christian, 0.8% Hindu, 0.2% Māori religious beliefs, 0.2% Buddhist, 0.1% New Age, and 1.2% other religions. People who answered that they had no religion were 54.0%, and 6.2% of people did not answer the census question.

Of those at least 15 years old, 387 (19.1%) people had a bachelor's or higher degree, 1,197 (59.0%) had a post-high school certificate or diploma, and 441 (21.7%) people exclusively held high school qualifications. The median income was $52,900, compared with $41,500 nationally. 288 people (14.2%) earned over $100,000 compared to 12.1% nationally. The employment status of those at least 15 was 1,182 (58.3%) full-time, 375 (18.5%) part-time, and 18 (0.9%) unemployed.
