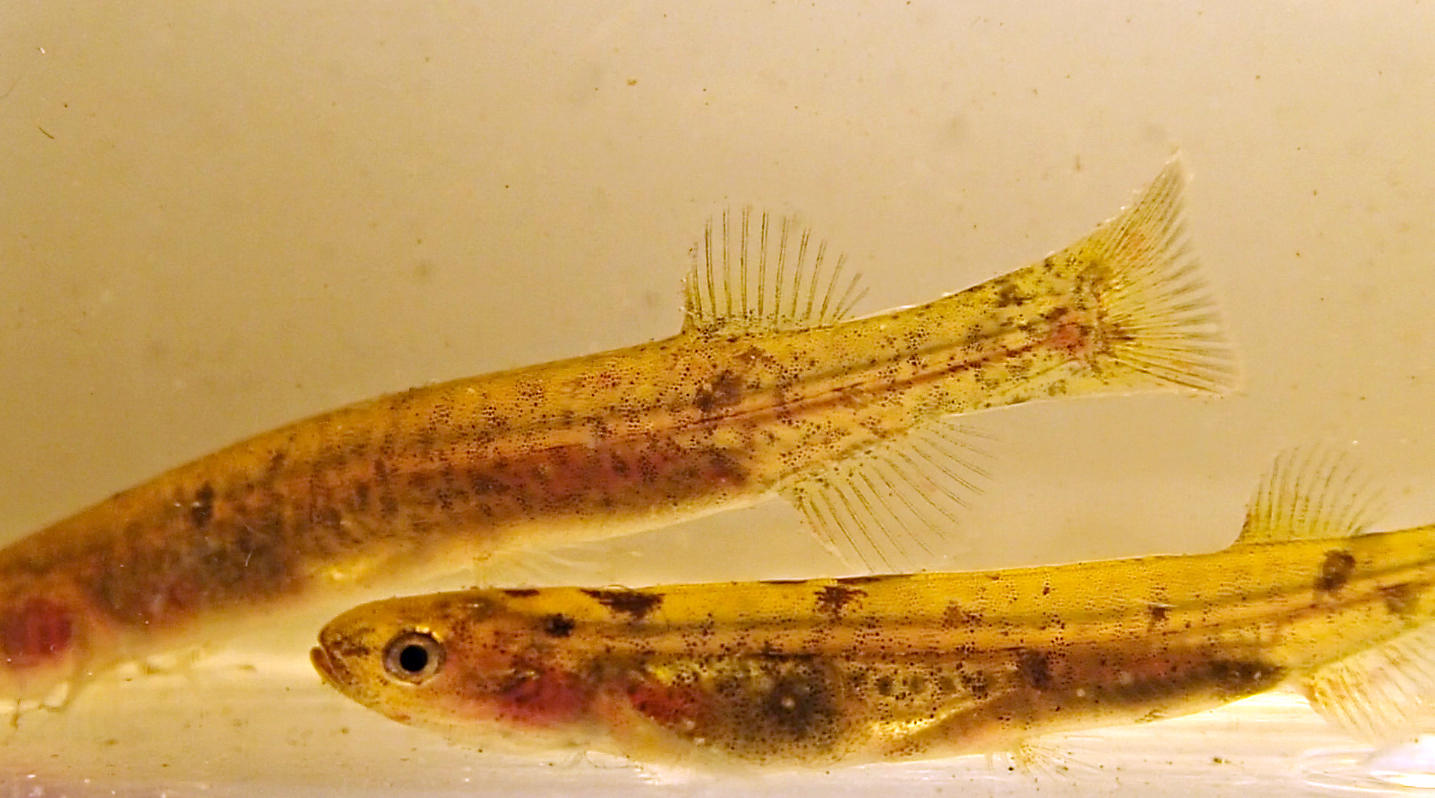
- N. cleaveri in Tasmania, Australia

Conservation status
- Endangered (IUCN 3.1)

Scientific classification
- Kingdom: Animalia
- Phylum: Chordata
- Class: Actinopterygii
- Order: Galaxiiformes
- Family: Galaxiidae
- Genus: Neochanna
- Species: N. cleaveri

Binomial name
- Neochanna cleaveri (E. O. G. Scott, 1934)
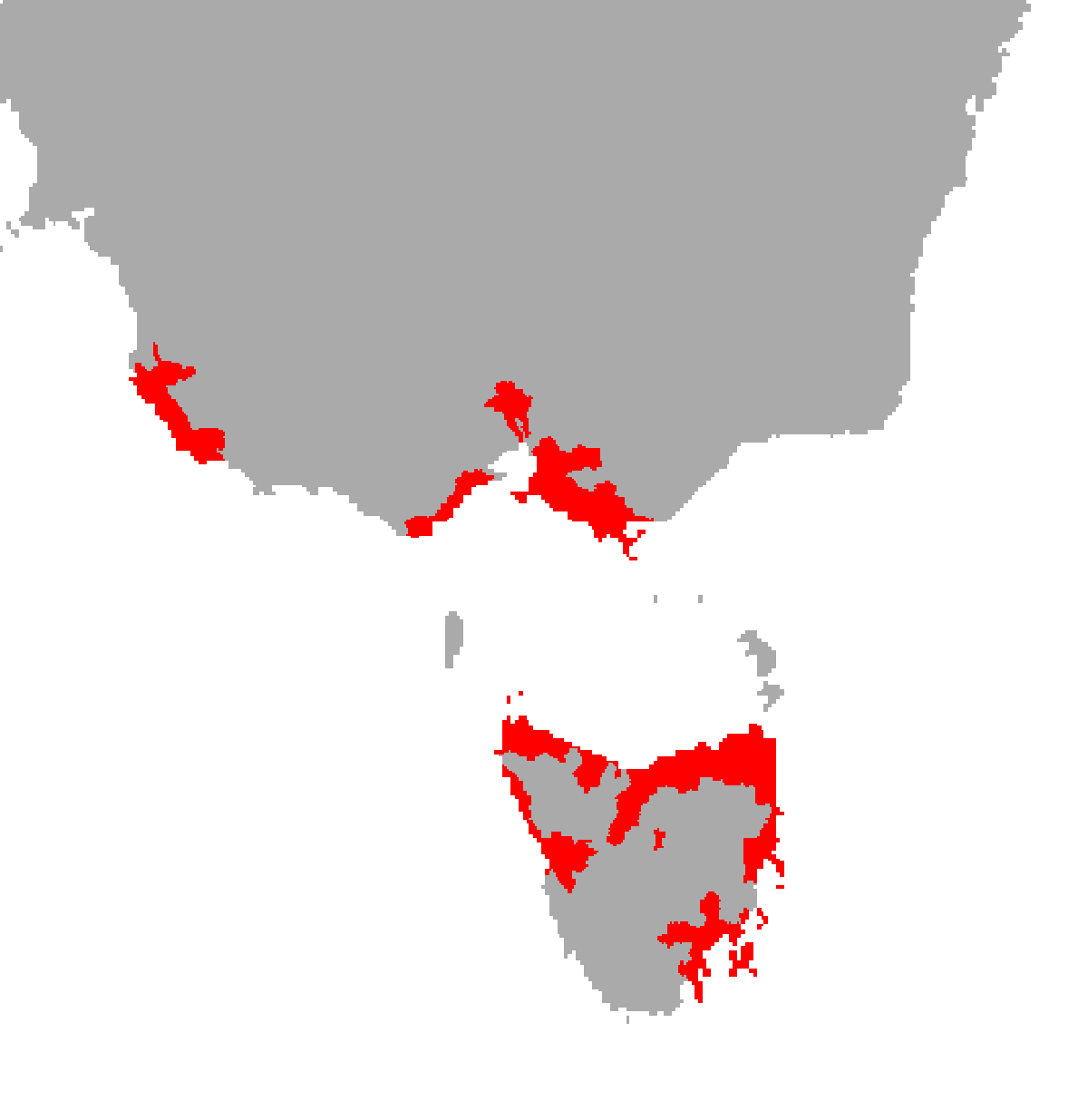

= Tasmanian mudfish =

Species of ray-finned fish

The Tasmanian mudfish (Neochanna cleaveri) is a small Australian amphidromous ray-finned fish in the family Galaxiidae.

== Distribution ==
Neochanna cleaveri is found in coastal wetlands of south eastern Australia: around Tasmania, Flinders Island in Bass Strait and southern Victoria particularly Wilsons Promontory. Isolated populations occur in the Otways, near Geelong and Melbourne in Victoria, as well as in far eastern South Australia near Naracoorte. The fish's range has been significantly reduced, especially in Victoria, due to destruction of suitable habitat through human activity such as swamp reclamation and drainage.

== Description ==
Typically galaxiid in form, scaleless, with an elongated, tubular body, and moderately sized mouth, it may be distinguished from other galaxiid species by the small eye and the blunt, rounded head shape with protruding tubular nostrils over the upper lip. Pectoral fins are rounded. The pelvic fins are small and set at about the midpoint of the fish's length, and the dorsal and anal fins are set right back with the dorsal fin slightly ahead of the anal. Caudal fins are rounded with well-developed flanges along the caudal peduncle reaching nearly to the posterior edges of the dorsal and anal fins. Greenish brown in colour, sometimes golden, they are greyish on their ventral surfaces, and marked with irregular darker mottled bands and blotches over the back, sides, and fin bases. Its length is up to 140 mm; commonly it grows to 80 mm.

== Habitat ==
This species is found mostly in muddy swamps, marshes and drains with heavy vegetation. The fragmented populations in Victoria are likely to be remnants of a larger continuous population before European settlement.

== Importance to humans ==
Although individuals would be taken as part of the Tasmanian whitebait fishery, the numbers of this species involved is likely to be quite small. It adapts well to captivity and is easy to keep, but is secretive and nocturnal, limiting its appeal.

== Conservation status ==
Tasmanian mudfish are not listed nationally as threatened due to their relative abundance in Tasmania. The fish is, however, listed in Victoria as critically endangered under the Victorian Flora and Fauna Guarantee Act.

== Lifecycle ==
Spawning in late winter, the hatched larvae are washed out to sea, spending about 2 to 3 months at sea or in estuaries before returning to fresh water as part of the whitebait migration. Tasmanian mudfish are smaller than other species comprising the whitebait fishery, generally only 30 to 40 mm at this age. The juvenile fish migrate upstream to their usual habitat. Nocturnal in habit and secretive in nature, the fish usually rest during daylight in heavy vegetation or half buried in the muddy substrate. N. cleaveri can aestivate if water in its location dries up in summer or in times of drought, burying horizontally in the mud or by seeking out moist areas of substrate under rocks and logs.

== Naming ==
Other common names include Australian mudfish, mud trout, and mud galaxias.

Other scientific names include: Galaxias cleaveri, Saxilaga cleaveri, Saxilaga anguilliforms, and Galaxias upcheri.

The genus Neochanna is derived from the Greek neos meaning new and Channa, an Asian genus of aestivating fishes. The species name is derived from the fish's original collector, Mr. F. Cleaver.
