= Kosmos 482 =

Failed Soviet Venus probe

- Names: Kosmos 482 main bus
- Mission type: Delivery of a lander to Venus
- Operator: Soviet Academy of Sciences
- COSPAR ID: 1972-023A
- SATCAT no.: 5919
- Mission duration: Launch failure

Spacecraft properties
- Spacecraft type: 3V (V-72) no. 671
- Bus: 3MV
- Launch mass: 1,180 kilograms (2,600 lb) (including the descent module)

Start of mission
- Launch date: March 31, 1972, 04:02:00 UTC
- Rocket: Molniya 8K78M
- Launch site: Baikonur 31/6

End of mission
- Decay date: 5 May 1981 final sections of 1972-023A

Kosmos 482 descent craft
- Mission type: Venus lander (intended) Earth Impactor (accidental)
- Operator: Soviet Academy of Sciences
- COSPAR ID: 1972-023E
- SATCAT no.: 6073
- Mission duration: Launch failure

Spacecraft properties
- Launch mass: 495 kilograms (1,091 lb)

Start of mission
- Launch date: March 31, 1972, 04:02:00 UTC
- Deployed from: Separated from the main bus
- Deployment date: mid-June 1972

End of mission
- Decay date: Reentry 06:04-07:32 UTC 10 May 2025

Orbital parameters
- Reference system: Geocentric
- Regime: Low Earth orbit
- Semi-major axis: 6,588 kilometres (4,094 mi)
- Perigee altitude: 120 kilometres (75 mi) 00:35 UTC 10 May 2025
- Apogee altitude: 166 kilometres (103 mi) 00:35 UTC 10 May 2025
- Inclination: 51.95°
- Period: 88.7 minutes
- Epoch: 00:36 UTC 10 May 2025

Kosmos 482 (Russian: "Космос 482" meaning Cosmos 482) was an attempted Soviet Venus probe. Launched 31 March 1972, at 04:02:33 UTC, it failed to escape low Earth orbit. Because of this, its name was retrospectively changed to "Kosmos" which was used for Earth-orbiting satellites.

After achieving a parking orbit around Earth, the full Venera payload (1972-023A) separated into two objects. What was calculated to be the Venera main bus kept the 1972-023A designation, while the designation 1972-023E (catalogue no. 6073) was assigned to the descent craft, which was the section meant to be landed on Venus. The main bus and its associated rocket stages reentered Earth's atmosphere between 3 April 1972 and 5 May 1981.

During a 6:04 to 7:32 UTC window on 10 May 2025, the descent craft crashed while it was on a trajectory over Australia, the Indian Ocean, the Middle East and Europe. According to the Russian space agency Roscosmos, it crashed at 6:24 UTC, into the north-eastern Indian Ocean.

The landing module, which weighed around 495 kilograms (1,091 lb), may have reached the surface of Earth largely intact. Correctly oriented, it was designed to withstand 300 g of acceleration and 100 atmospheres of pressure entering the atmosphere of Venus. However, the age of the craft and the shallow angle of reentry likely reduced survivability; tumbling or misorientation may have resulted in sections of the craft burning up in Earth's atmosphere. The final impact velocity was estimated to be 65–70 metres per second (230–250 km/h; 150–160 mph) using a TUDAT simulation.

== Background ==
Beginning in 1962, the name Kosmos was given to Soviet spacecraft which remained in Earth orbit, regardless of whether that was their intended final destination. The designation of this mission as an intended planetary probe is based on evidence from Soviet and non-Soviet sources and historical documents. Typically Soviet planetary missions were initially put into an Earth parking orbit as a launch platform with a rocket engine and attached probe. The probes were then launched toward their targets with an engine burn with a duration of roughly four minutes. If the engine misfired or the burn was not completed, the probes would be left in Earth orbit and given a Kosmos designation.

== History ==
Kosmos 482 was launched by a Molniya booster on 31 March 1972, four days after the Venera 8 atmospheric probe and may have been similar in design and mission plan. After achieving an Earth parking orbit, the spacecraft made an apparent attempt to launch into a Venus transfer trajectory. It separated into four pieces, two of which remained in low Earth orbit and decayed within 48 hours into south New Zealand and two pieces (presumably the payload and detached engine unit) went into a higher 210 km × 9,800 km (130 mi × 6,090 mi), 51.95 degree inclination orbit. An incorrectly set timer caused the Blok L stage to cut off prematurely, preventing the probe from escaping Earth orbit.

=== 1972 re-entry pieces ===
The first of these pieces, four red-hot 13.6-kilogram (30 lb) titanium alloy spheres, with a diameter of 38 centimetres (15 in), crashed within a 16-kilometre (10 mi) radius of each other just outside Ashburton, New Zealand, at 1:00 AM on 3 April 1972. The spheres scorched holes in crops and made deep indentations in the soil, but no one was injured. A similarly shaped object was discovered near Eiffelton, New Zealand, in 1978.

Space law required that the space junk be returned to its national owner, but the Soviets denied knowledge or ownership of the satellite. Ownership therefore fell to the farmer upon whose property the satellite fell. The pieces were thoroughly analyzed by New Zealand scientists which determined that they were Soviet in origin because of manufacturing marks and the high-tech welding of the titanium. The scientists concluded that they were probably gas pressure vessels of a kind used in the launching rocket for a satellite or space vehicle and had decayed in the atmosphere.

=== 2025 re-entry ===
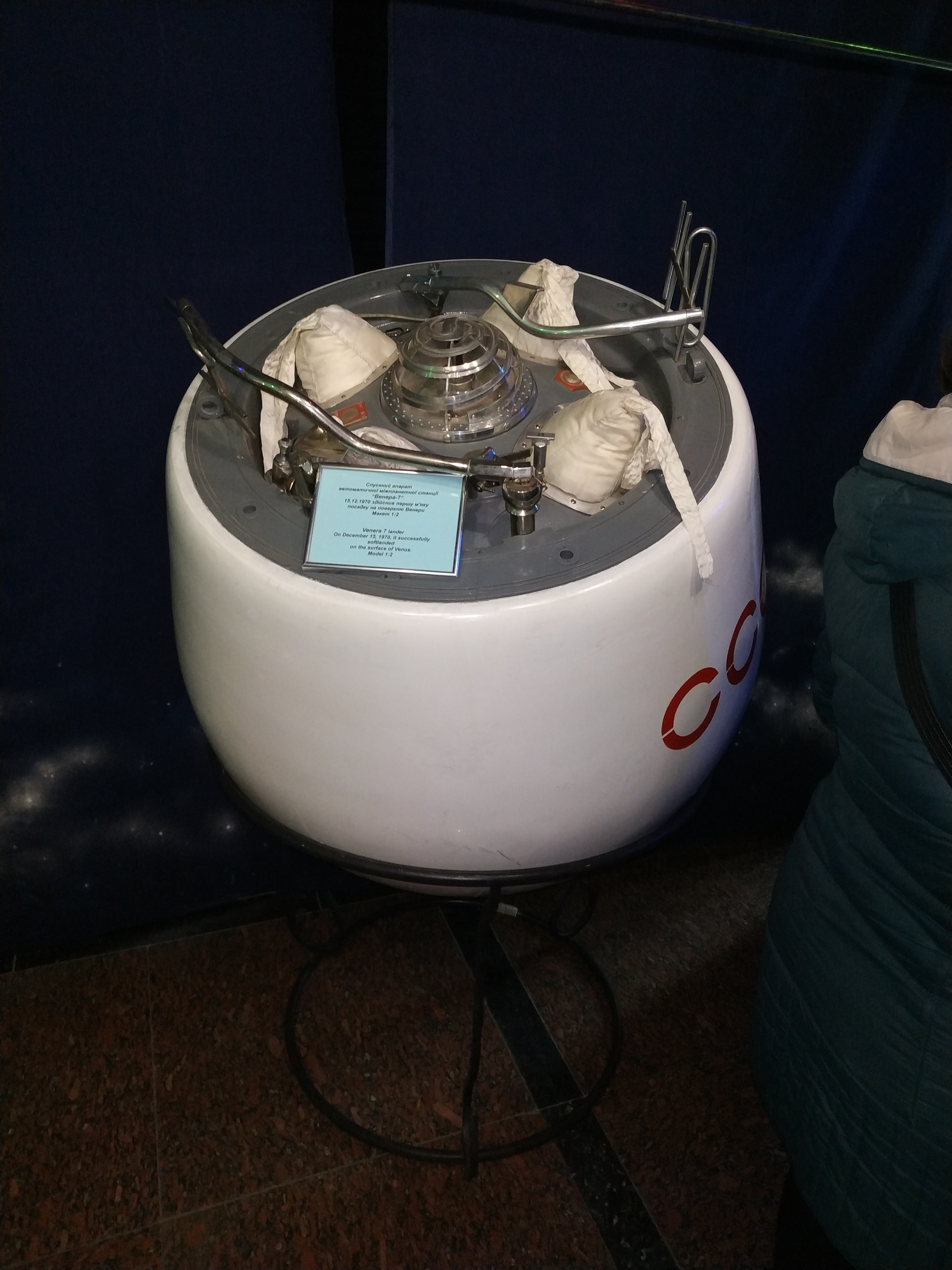
Lander of the Venera 7 mission

The last remaining piece in orbit, the descent craft, reentered on 10 May 2025, somewhere between 51.95 degrees north and south latitude.

As of 10 May 2025, the European Space Agency (ESA) reported that the descent craft was not detected by radar during a predicted pass over Germany at 07:32 UTC (09:32 CEST). Based on this, ESA concluded that reentry most likely already occurred earlier that morning.

According to the Russian space agency Roscosmos the lander had impacted the eastern Indian Ocean at 6:24 a.m. UTC west of Jakarta, Indonesia.

== See also ==
- List of missions to Venus
- Soviet space program
- Space debris
- List of space debris fall incidents
