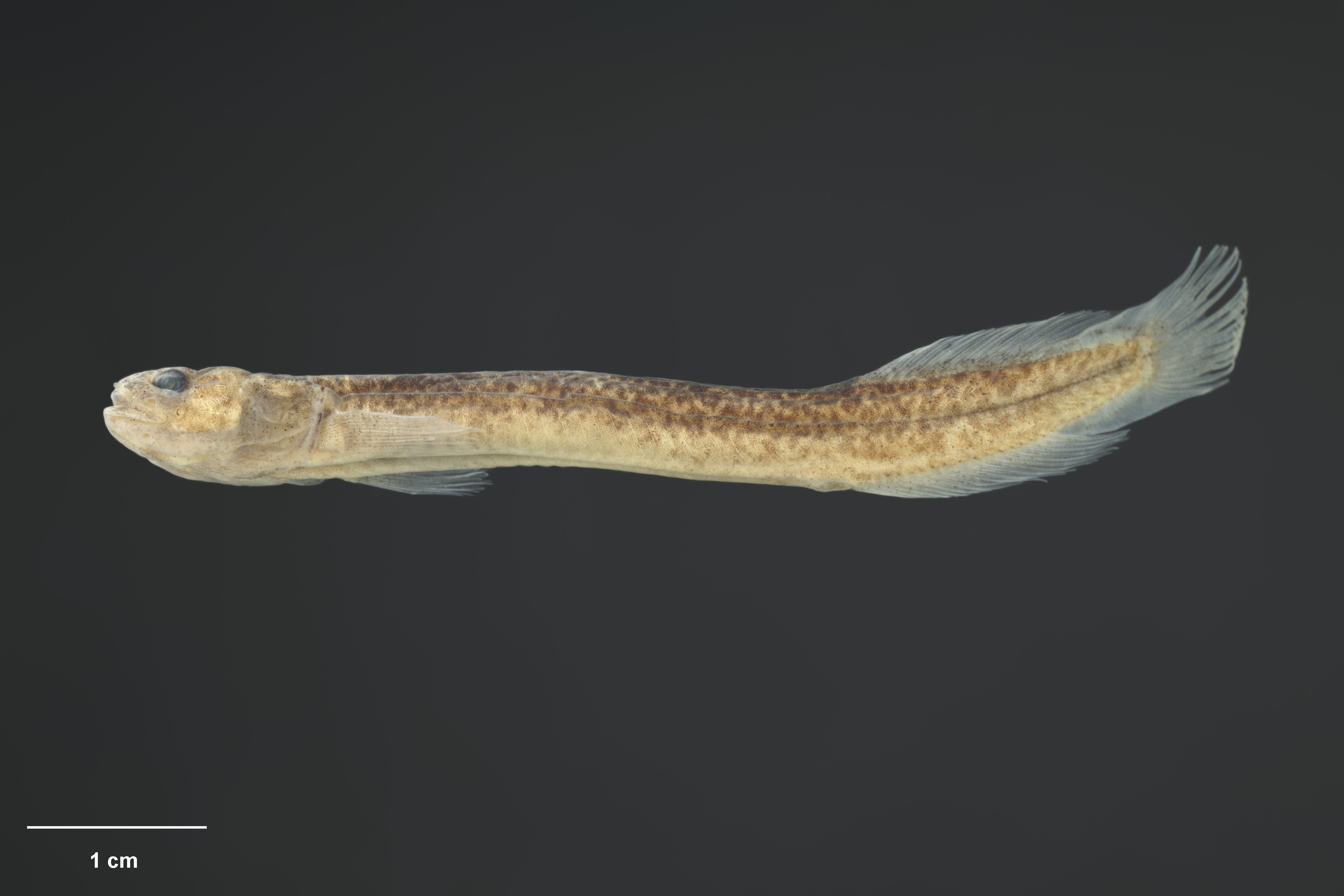
- Type specimen from Te Papa

Scientific classification
- Kingdom: Animalia
- Phylum: Chordata
- Class: Actinopterygii
- Order: Galaxiiformes
- Family: Galaxiidae
- Genus: Neochanna
- Species: N. heleios

Binomial name
- Neochanna heleios Ling & Gleeson, 2001
- Approximate known distribution (in orange) of the Northland mudfish on a map of the North Island

= Northland mudfish =

Species of ray-finned fish

The Northland mudfish (Neochanna heleios) is a galaxiid of the genus Neochanna, found only in swampy locations west of the Bay of Islands in Northland, New Zealand. Its length is up to 134 millimetres (5.3 in).

In 2026, the Northland mudfish won the New Zealand Fish of the Year competition.

== Etymology ==
Heleios means "marsh dwelling". Neochanna is a compound word of neo, meaning new, and channa, meaning anchovy.
