= Composite overwrapped pressure vessel =

Pressure vessel with a non-structural liner wrapped with a structural fiber composite

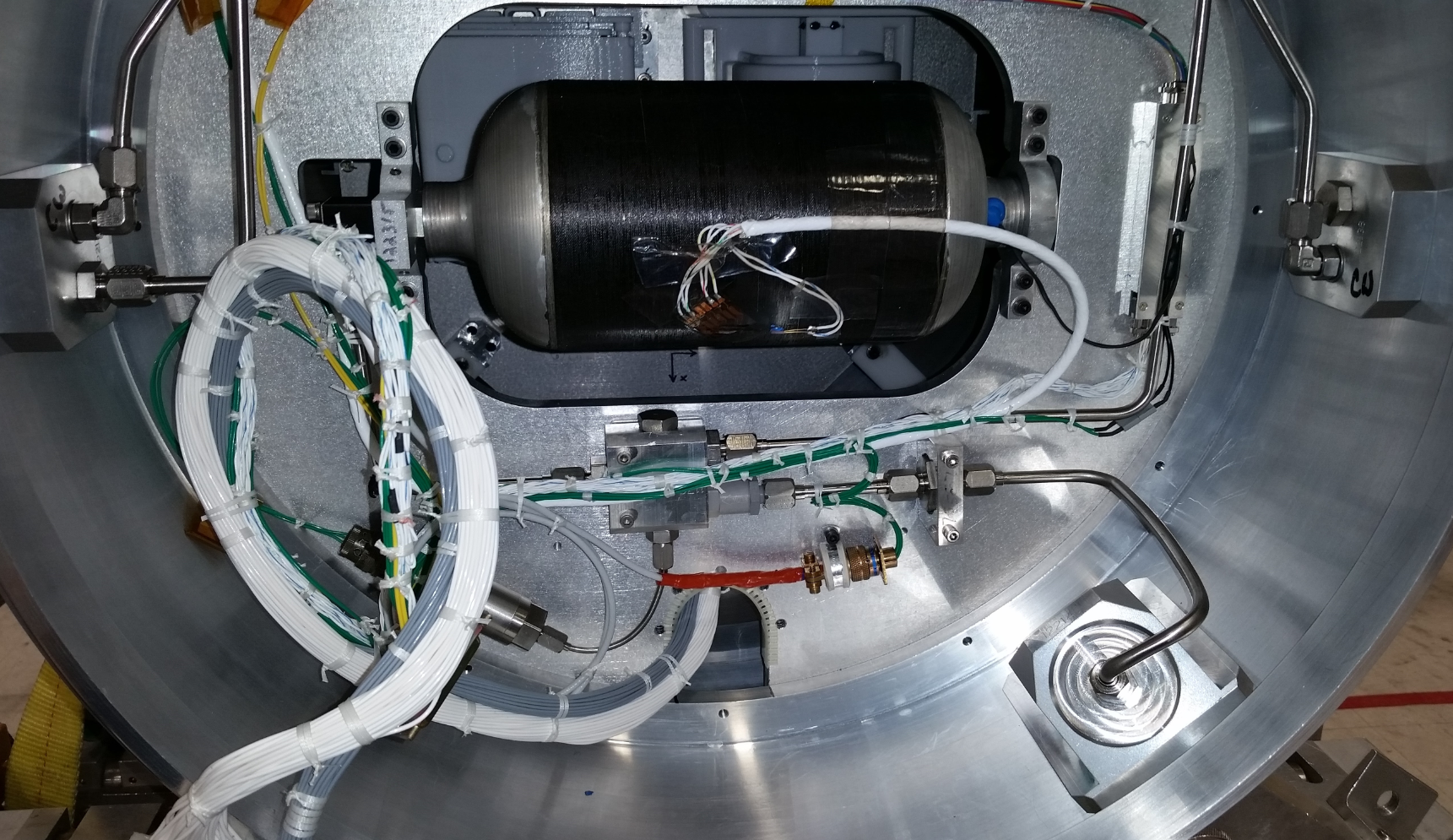
A COPV inside a sounding rocket

A composite overwrapped pressure vessel (COPV) is a vessel consisting of a thin, non-structural liner wrapped with a structural fiber composite, designed to hold a fluid under pressure. The liner provides a barrier between the fluid and the composite, preventing leaks (which can occur through matrix microcracks which do not cause structural failure) and chemical degradation of the structure. In general, a protective shell is applied for shielding against impact damage. The most commonly used composites are fiber reinforced polymers (FRP), using carbon and kevlar fibers. The primary advantage of a COPV as compared to a similar sized metallic pressure vessel is lower weight; COPVs, however, carry an increased cost of manufacturing and certification.

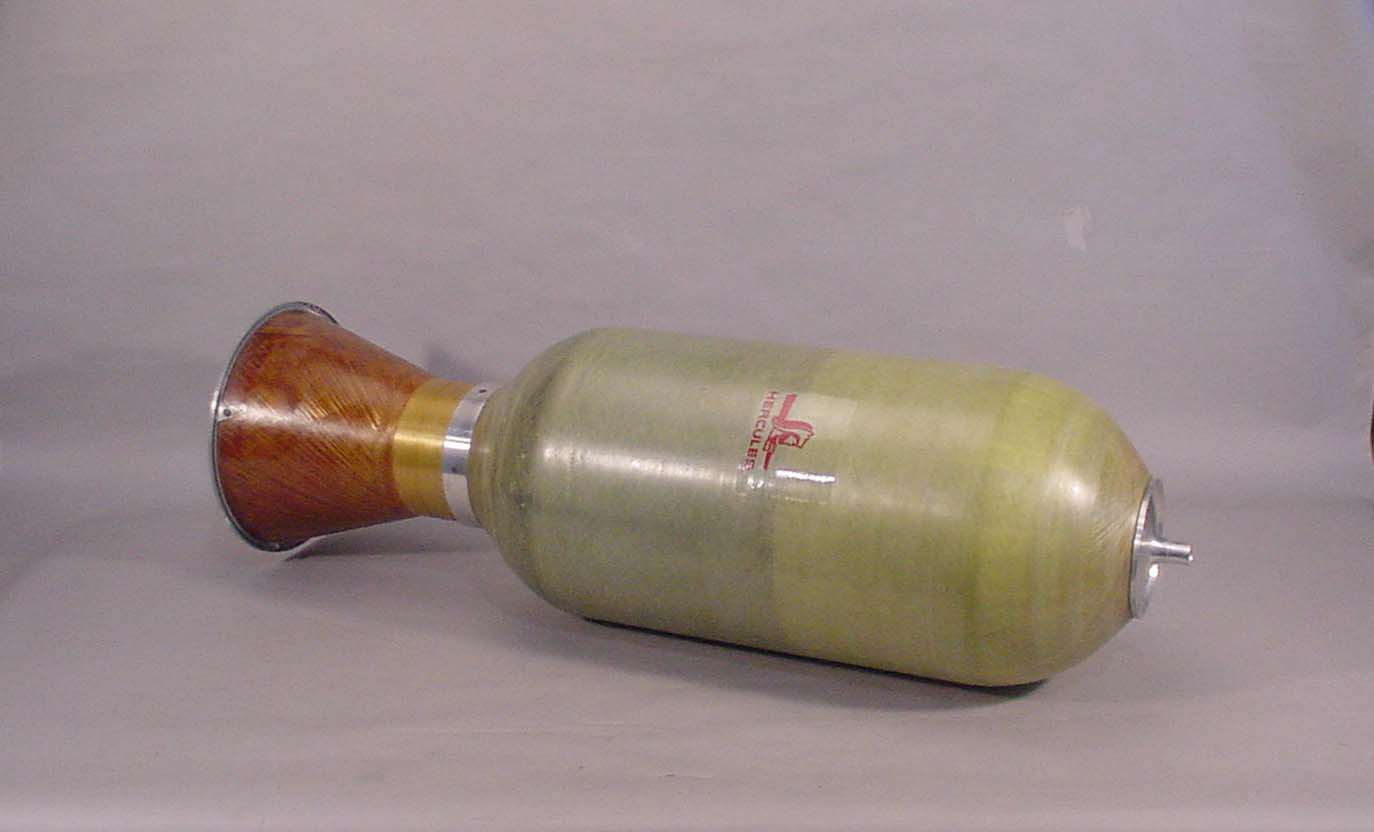
Casing of the Altair rocket stage, essentially a fiberglass composite overwrapped pressure vessel

== Overview ==
A composite overwrapped pressure vessel (COPV) is a pressure-containing vessel, typically composed of a metallic liner, a composite overwrap, and one or more bosses. They are used in spaceflight due to their high strength and low weight.

During operation, COPVs expand from their unpressurized state.

== Manufacturing ==
COPVs are commonly manufactured by winding resin-impregnated high tensile strength fiber tape directly onto a cylindrical or spherical metallic liner. A robot places the tape so that the fibers lay straight and do not cross or kink, which would create a stress concentration in the fiber, and also ensures that there are minimal gaps or voids between tapes. The entire vessel is then heated in a temperature controlled oven in order to harden the composite resin.

During manufacturing, COPVs undergo a process called autofrettage. The unit is pressurized and the liner expands and plastically (permanently) deforms, resulting in a permanent volume increase. The pressure is then relieved and the liner contracts a small amount, being loaded in compression by the overwrap at near its compressive yield point. This residual strain improves cycle life. Another reason to autofrettage a vessel is to verify that the volume increase across pressure vessels in a product line remain within an expected range. Larger volume growth than usual could indicate manufacturing defects such as overwrap voids, a high stress gradient through the overwrap layers, or other damage.

== Testing ==
Various tests and inspections are performed on COPVs, including hydrostatic tests, stress-rupture lifetime, and nondestructive evaluation.

== Aging ==
Three main components affect a COPVs strength due to aging: cycle fatigue, age life of the overwrap, and stress rupture life.

== Failures ==
COPVs can be subject to complex modes of failure. In 2016, a SpaceX Falcon 9 rocket exploded on the pad due to the failure of a COPV inside the liquid oxygen tank: the failure resulted from accumulation of frozen solid oxygen between the COPV's aluminum liner and composite overwrap in a void or buckle. The entrapped oxygen can either break overwrap fibers or cause friction between fibers as it swells, igniting the fibers in the pure oxygen and causing the COPV to fail. A similar failure occurred in 2015 on CRS-7 when the COPV burst, causing the oxygen tank to overpressurize and explode 139 seconds into flight. On June 18, 2025, a SpaceX Starship prototype, S36 was destroyed by the failure of a COPV.

== See also ==
- Gas cylinder – Cylindrical container for storing pressurised gas
- Fuel tank – Safe container for flammable fluids, e.g., for a vehicle or oil heater
- Hydrogen tank – Container for hydrogen storage
- Graphite-Epoxy Motor – American solid rocket booster
