= Mid Canterbury =

Region of New Zealand

Coordinates: 43°45′S 171°30′E

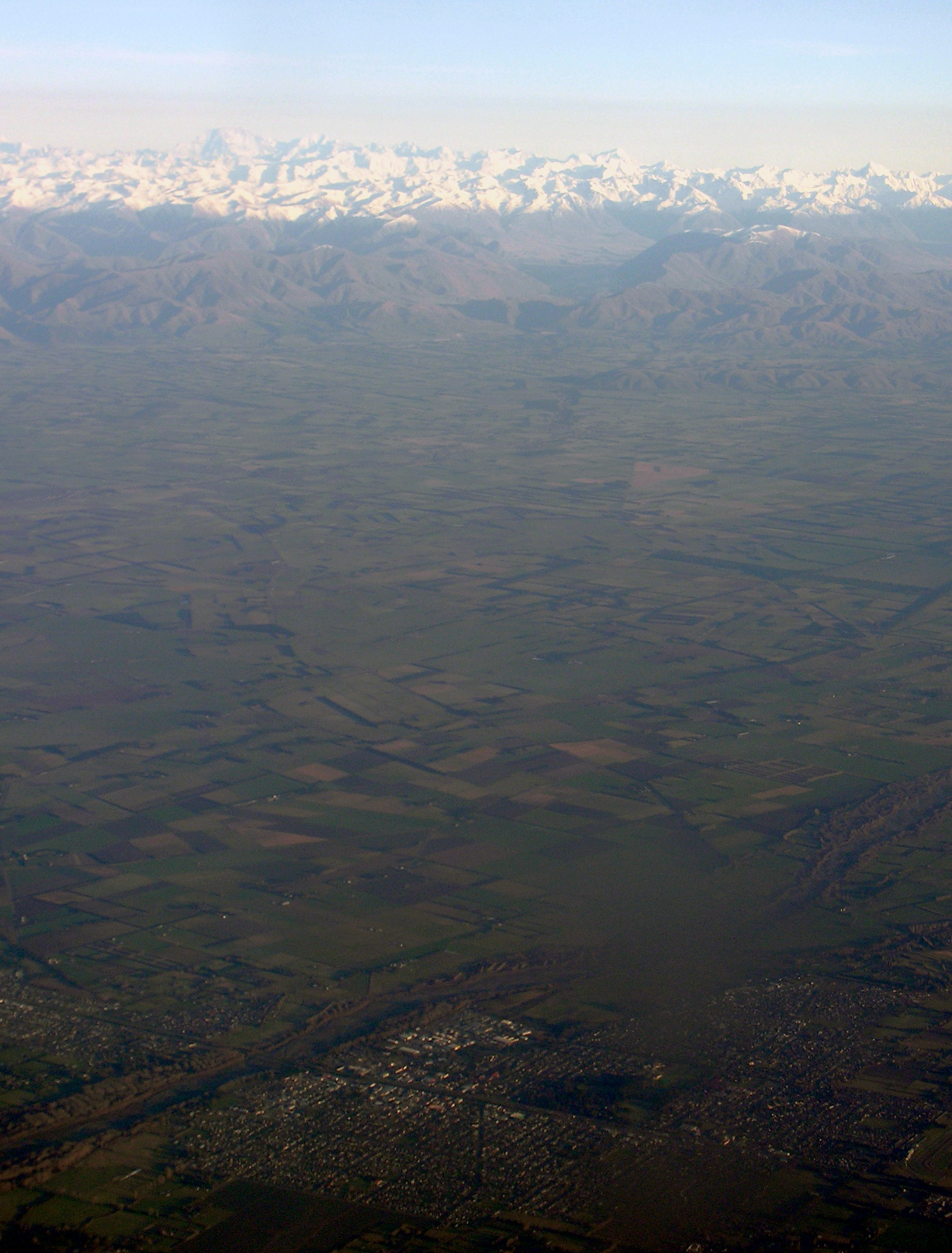
An aerial view across Mid Canterbury, with Ashburton in the foreground, the Canterbury Plains centre, and the Southern Alps in the background.

Mid Canterbury (also spelt Mid-Canterbury and mid-Canterbury) is a traditional, semi-official subregion of New Zealand's Canterbury Region extending inland from the Pacific coast to the Southern Alps. It is one of four traditional sub-regions of Canterbury, along with South Canterbury, North Canterbury, and Christchurch City.

The area is mainly agricultural, extending as it does across the Canterbury Plains, rising in the west to the high country. Beyond this the land rises sharply to the main divide and peaks of the Southern Alps. Several prominent peaks lie in Mid Canterbury, most notably the country's 23rd-highest mountain, the 3,019 metres (9,905 ft) Mount Dixon.

Various points are designated as being the southern and northern limits of Mid Canterbury, but all definitions of it include that area between the mouths of the Rangitata River and Rakaia Rivers, roughly coterminous with the Ashburton District. Some definitions push the northern border north to include Lake Coleridge and the approaches to Arthur's Pass, and increase the southern extent to include the Peel Forest and Orari Gorge.

Mid Canterbury has an area of some 6,500 square kilometres (2,500 sq mi) and a population of about 37,500, of whom a little over half live in the town of Ashburton. Smaller towns include Methven, Rakaia, Mount Somers, Mayfield and Hinds. Other features of the region include Mount Hutt and its associated skifield, the Ashburton River / Hakatere and Ashburton Lakes, the Rakaia Gorge, Pudding Hill, and Rangitata Island.

Many corporations, companies, and government agencies within the area use "Mid Canterbury" as part of their names, notably the Mid Canterbury Rugby Football Union. A former political electorate of Mid-Canterbury existed between 1928 and 1946.
