= Ashburton River / Hakatere =

River in Canterbury, New Zealand

Coordinates: 44°2′59″S 171°48′3″E

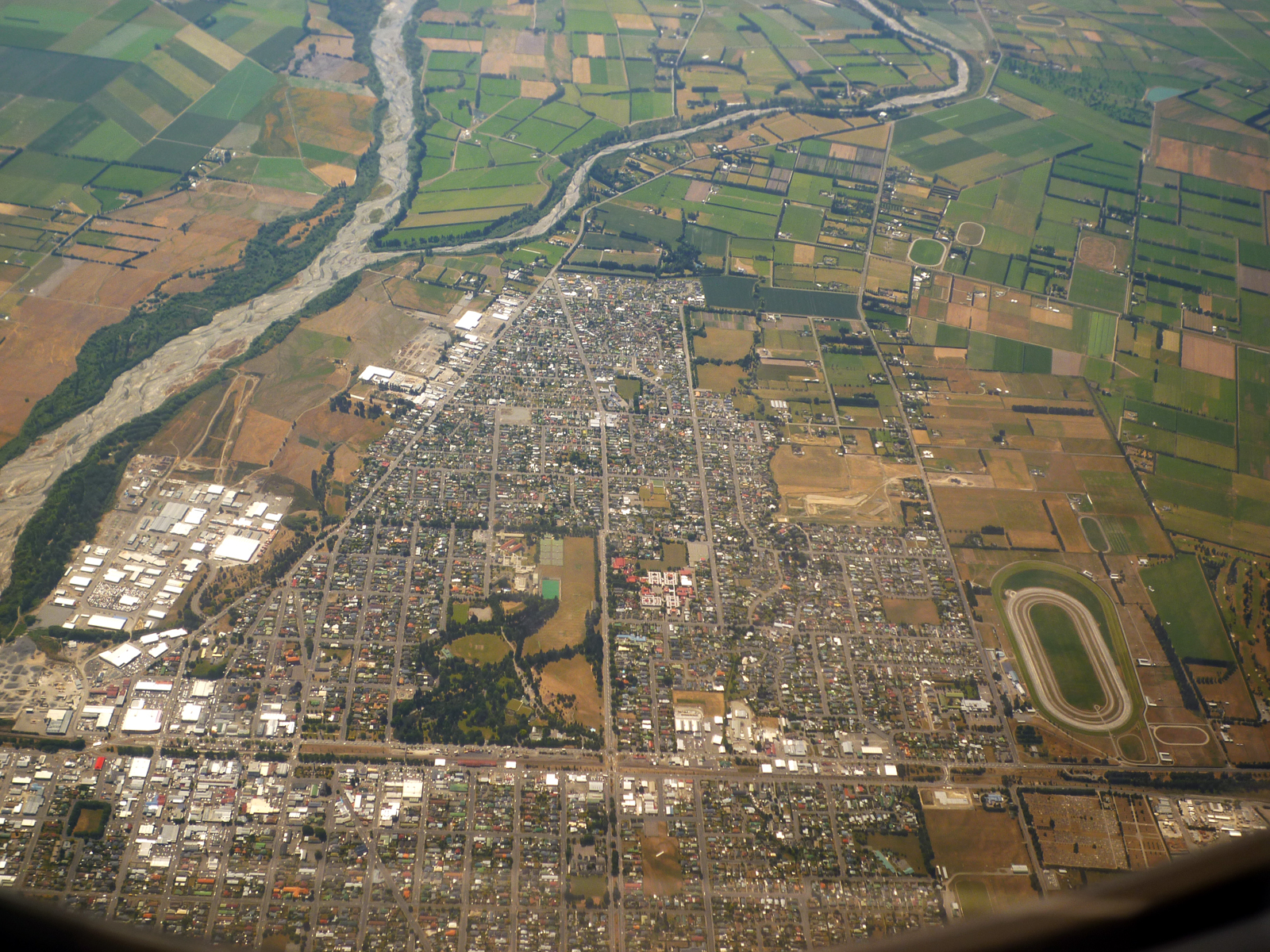
- This view of Ashburton, New Zealand shows the confluence of south (on left) and north branches

Location
- Country: New Zealand

Physical characteristics
- Mouth
  - location: Pacific Ocean
  - elevation: 0 metres (0 ft)

The Ashburton River / Hakatere is a river in the Canterbury region of New Zealand, flowing across Mid Canterbury from the Southern Alps to the Pacific Ocean. The official name of the river was amended to become a dual name by the Ngāi Tahu Claims Settlement Act 1998. It has been identified as an Important Bird Area by BirdLife International because it supports breeding colonies of the endangered black-billed gull. The river is a medium-sized gravel-bed braided river whose catchment includes the Ashburton Lakes / Ō Tū Wharekai wetland complex and supports a high diversity of native fish and birds, several of them threatened.

== Description ==
The river has two branches which meet 21 kilometres (13 mi) from the coast, just inland of the town of Ashburton. The branches remain parallel and no more than 3 kilometres (1.9 mi) apart for a further 20 kilometres (12 mi) upstream of their confluence, finally diverging near the small settlement of Ashburton Forks. The rivers' path southeast across the Canterbury Plains lies in a shallow depression between the higher shingle fans created by the much larger Rakaia and Rangitata rivers. Both branches are crossed via siphons by the Rangitata Diversion Race, part of an irrigation scheme.

=== North branch ===
Ashburton River North Branch / Hakatere
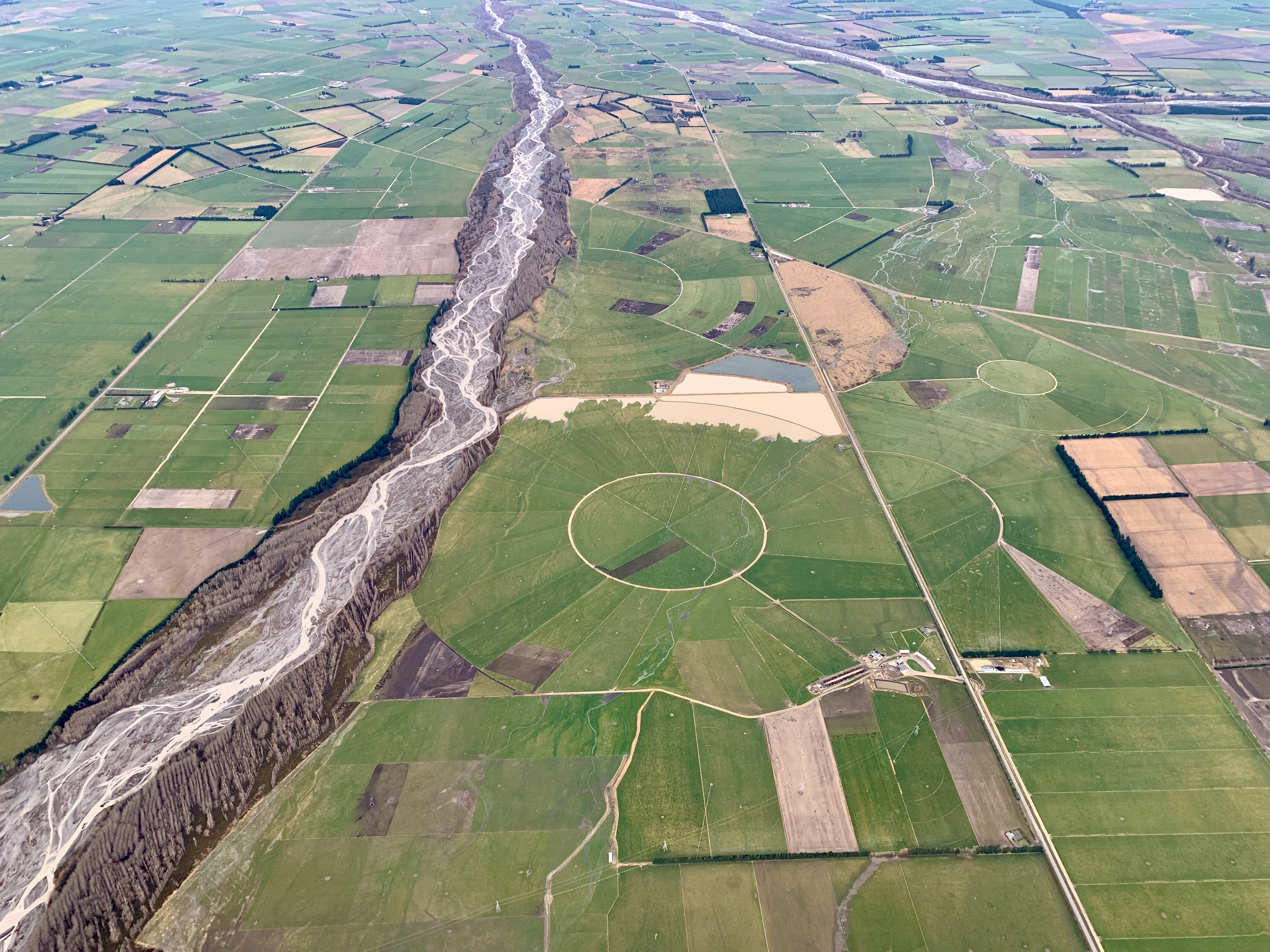

Physical characteristics
- Source
  - location: Godley Peak
  - elevation: 1,705 metres (5,594 ft)
- Length: 98 km (61 mi)

Basin features
- Tributaries
  - left: Swift River

The Ashburton River North Branch / Hakatere flows from the slopes of Godley Peak (2,087 metres (6,847 ft)) in the Palmer Range. The uppermost reach of the river is known as Petticoat lane. The river flows south then southwest through narrow scree-sided valleys with almost no areas of river flats. The Black Hills Range and Pudding Hill Range lie to the northeast and the Alford Range to the southwest. The river emerges from the hills adjacent to Pudding Hill airfield.

=== South branch ===
Ashburton River South Branch / Hakatere
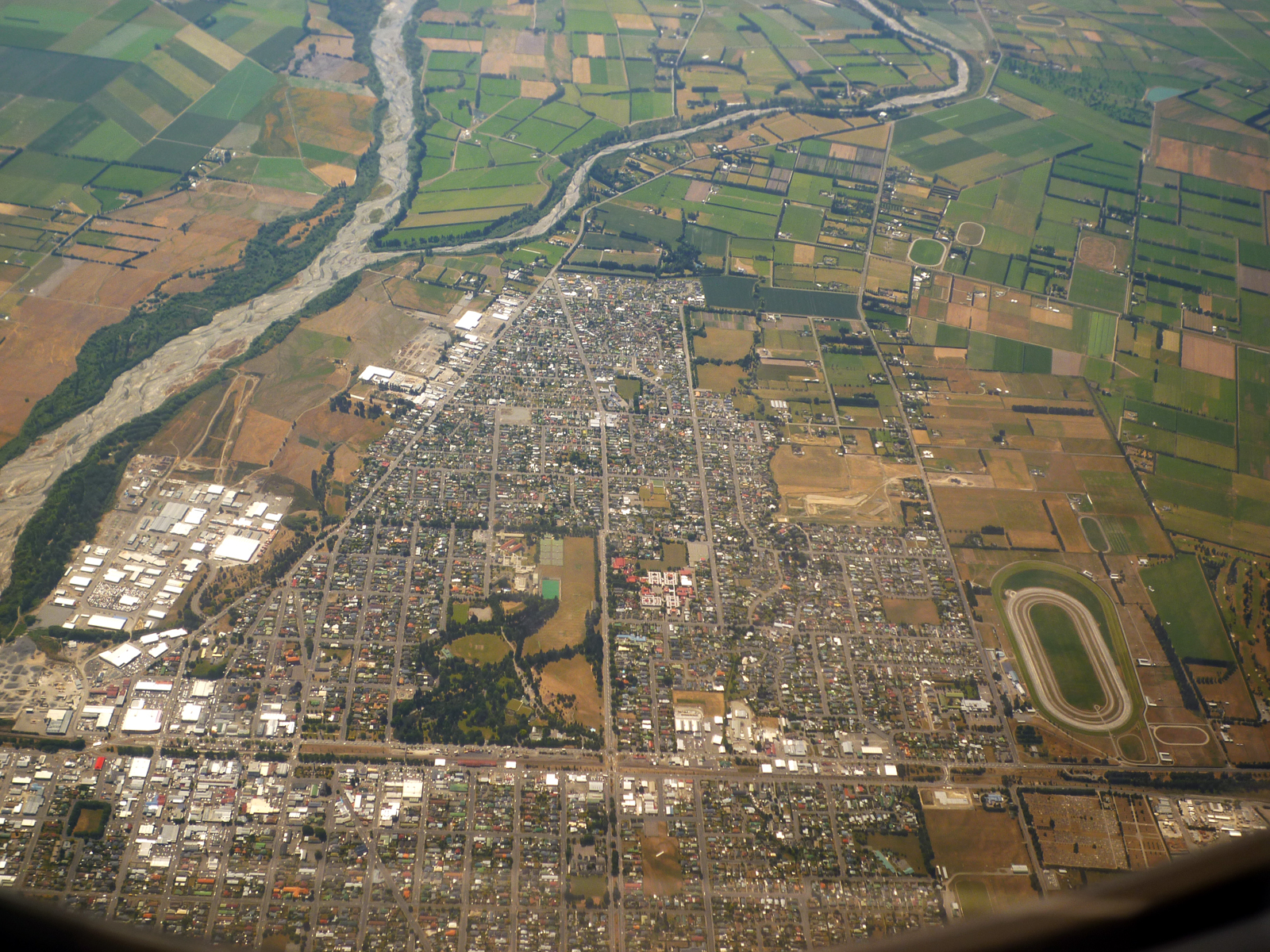

Physical characteristics
- Source
  - location: Ashburton Glacier
  - elevation: 1,480 metres (4,860 ft)
- Length: 113 km (70 mi)(source – sea)

Basin features
- Tributaries
  - left: Stour River

The larger Ashburton River South Branch / Hakatere starts as the outflow of the Ashburton Glacier which flows down from Mount Arrowsmith (2,781 metres (9,124 ft)), 26 kilometres (16 mi) west of the North branch source. It initially flows southeast down a narrow valley between the Big Hill Range and the Wild Man's Brother Range. 10 kilometres (6.2 mi) from source the river trends south, turning southeast again to cross the flat Hakatere Valley where the outflows of several small lakes (collectively known as the Ashburton Lakes) join it. The river exits the valley via the Ashburton Gorge, with the Moorhouse Range to the south and the Clent Hills and Winterslow Range to the north, emerging onto the Canterbury Plains at Mount Somers then flowing east towards Ashburton Forks.

== Hydrology and management ==
The Ashburton River / Hakatere is described by Land, Air, Water Aotearoa as a medium-sized gravel-bed braided river with a flow regime typical of glacial-fed systems in Canterbury. Its discharge is largely driven by precipitation and snowmelt in the alpine headwaters, with lowest flows in late summer and highest during spring. Water quality is generally best in the relatively undeveloped upper catchment and becomes progressively more impacted in the intensively farmed lowland reaches nearer the coast.

Heavy rain between 28 and 31 May 2021 caused major flooding in the catchment. A regional state of emergency was declared in Canterbury, and authorities warned that around 4,000 people in Ashburton might need to evacuate if the river’s stopbanks failed. Environment Canterbury flow records show the river at Ashburton rising from around 6 m^{3}/s (210 cu ft/s) on 28 May to more than 1,500 m^{3}/s (53,000 cu ft/s) late on 30 May 2021. The flooding damaged farms, roads and river-protection works and temporarily closed several bridges and state highways in the district.

At the same time, low flows and water allocation have been long-running environmental concerns. Environment Canterbury has reviewed many surface-water and stream-depleting groundwater consents in the Hakatere / Ashburton catchment. From 1 July 2023, consent holders with the new conditions must cease taking water when the flow at the State Highway 1 bridge recorder is less than 6 m^{3}/s (210 cu ft/s). The minimum-flow regime, incorporated into the Canterbury Land and Water Regional Plan, is intended to improve the river’s natural character and mauri, promote ecosystem health and biodiversity, improve water quality, and help keep the hāpua (river-mouth lagoon) open for longer.

== Ecology and conservation ==
Together with the nearby Rakaia and Rangitata rivers, the Ashburton / Hakatere and its associated lakes, wetlands and hāpua form part of Canterbury’s braided-river system. Environment Canterbury’s Ashburton Zone Implementation Programme notes that the district’s braided rivers and lakes provide over 70,000 ha (170,000 acres) of habitat for aquatic birdlife and can support some 40,000 birds at any one time.

The Hakatere / Ashburton catchment supports about 14 native fish species, including threatened Canterbury mudfish and the endemic smelt Stokell's smelt, as well as threatened invertebrates such as freshwater kōura. Around 48 native bird species use the river, four of them nationally threatened and two at risk; these include braided-river specialists such as wrybill, banded dotterel, pied stilt and black-billed gull. The river’s importance for black-billed gull breeding is reflected in its designation as an Important Bird Area, and long-term monitoring has recorded large nesting colonies on the lower river, including what has been described as a “super-colony” of around 10,000 birds near the State Highway 1 bridge in some seasons.

Within the wider zone, Environment Canterbury identifies the Ō Tū Wharekai wetlands system (which includes the 12 Ashburton Lakes) and the Hakatere / Ashburton River as biodiversity highlights. Ō Tū Wharekai is regarded as one of the best remaining examples of an intact inter-montane wetland system in Aotearoa New Zealand and is part of the Department of Conservation’s Arawai Kākāriki wetland-restoration programme.

At the coast, the Hakatere hāpua (river-mouth lagoon) is described by Environment Canterbury as the world’s only large roosting site for spotted shags. The river mouth also has large runs of the endemic Stokell's smelt (locally known as “silveries”) and provides feeding grounds for wrybill and other shorebirds. In spring, a large colony of black-billed gulls nests on the braided riverbed near the mouth, building nests from driftwood and stones. Because of this ecological value, the lower river and river mouth have been the focus of multiple shorebird habitat management plans and monitoring programmes led by Environment Canterbury, the Department of Conservation and community groups, including predator- and weed-control projects, mechanical re-braiding of vegetation-choked channels, and the construction of artificial nesting islands for gulls and terns.

== History ==
The river was first known by its Māori name, Hakatere, and marked the boundary between the villages of Taumotu, at the mouth of Lake Ellesmere / Te Waihora to the north, and Arowhenua, south of the Rangitata River. Travellers camped there to catch eels when journeying between the two. The Kai Tahu chief Tarawhata had a settlement near the mouth of the Hakatere in the mid 19th century.

In early 1844 government official Edward Shortland and his party, travelling north from Otago, took an inland route to avoid coastal swamps and camped on an island in the bed of the Hakatere. They noted that it was nearly dry in summer, but broad and swift in winter when fed by snows. Around 1848–49 the river was renamed the Ashburton by the Canterbury Association surveyor Joseph Thomas, after Bingham Baring, 2nd Baron Ashburton (a banker and investor who was a leading member of the Association.

The settlement of Ashburton was built later on the north bank of the river, from which it took its name; the river separates it from its southern suburb, Tinwald, and marks the boundary between Mid Canterbury and South Canterbury. A small cairn north of the Ashburton River bridge commemorates "William Turton's Accommodation House", Ashburton's first building, erected in 1858. Turton was responsible for ferrying people across the river, which had a soft and treacherous base and was more hazardous than today.
