= Canterbury Plains =

Plain in New Zealand

Coordinates: 43.64°S 172.09°E

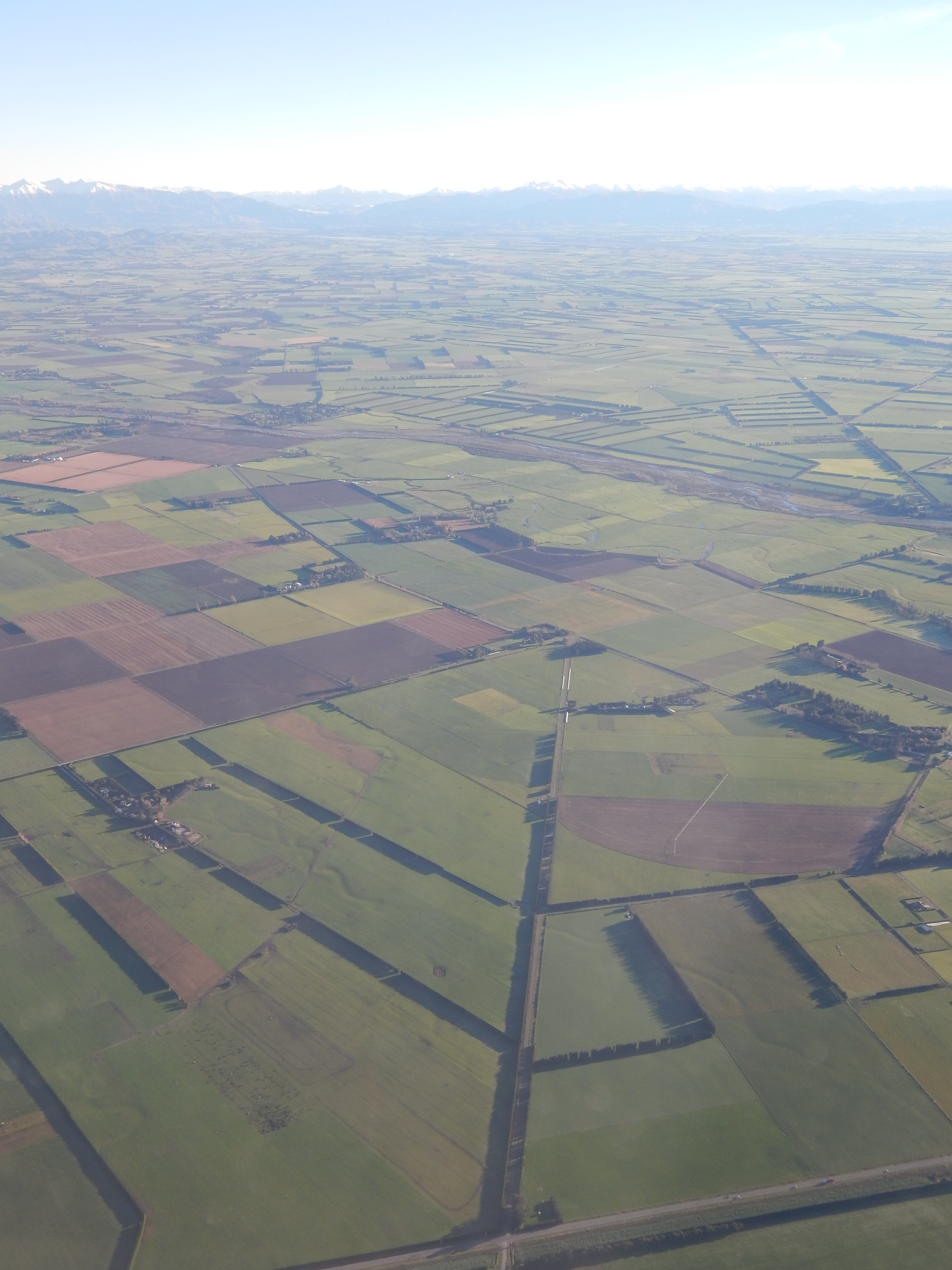
Aerial view of the Canterbury Plains

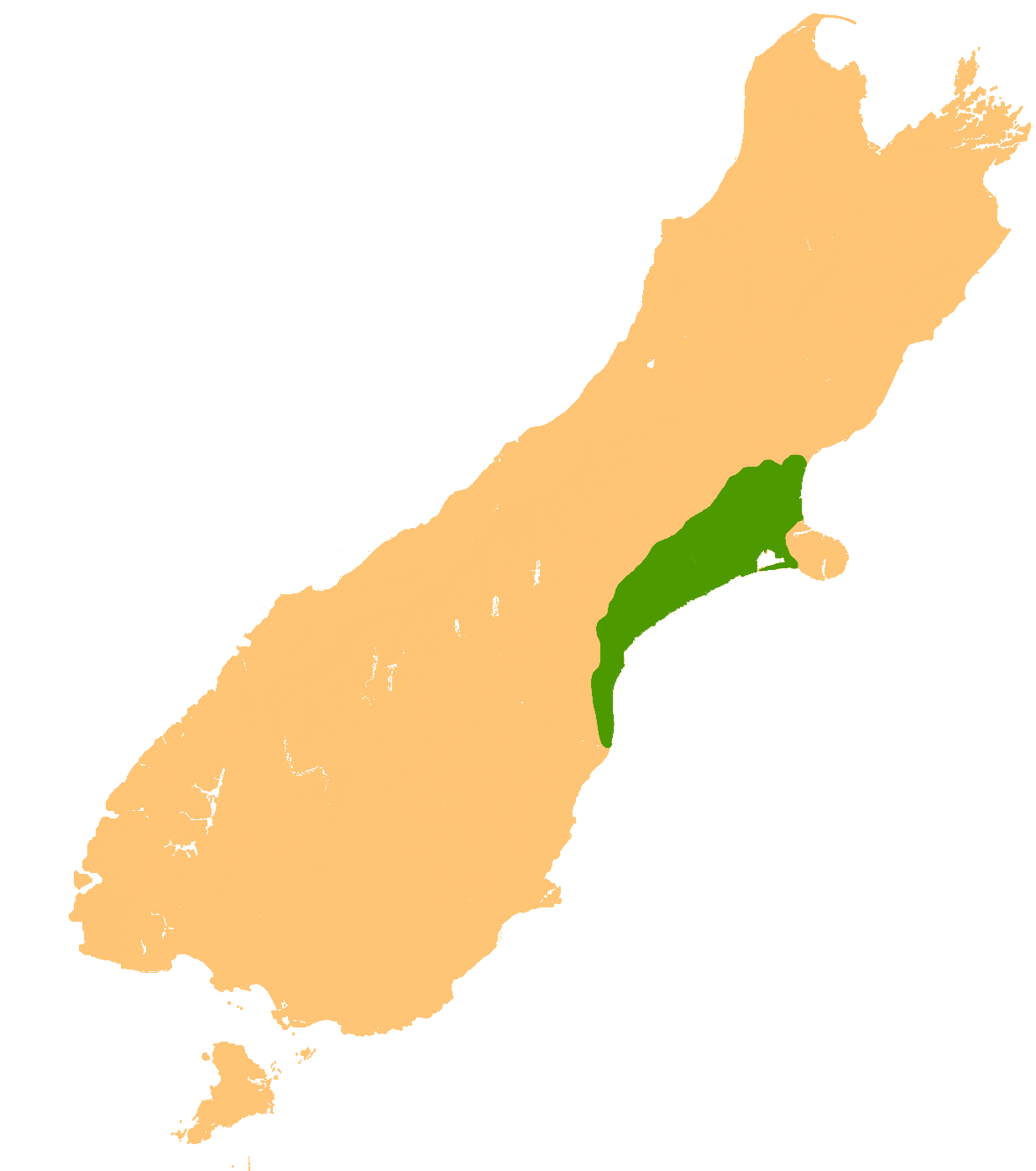
Location of the Canterbury Plains

The Canterbury Plains (Māori: Kā Pākihi-whakatekateka-a-Waitaha) are an area in New Zealand centred in the Mid Canterbury, to the south of the city of Christchurch in the Canterbury region. Their northern extremes are at the foot of the Hundalee Hills in the Hurunui District, and in the south they merge into the plains of North Otago beyond the Waitaki River. The smaller Amuri Plain forms a northern extension of the plains.

== Geology ==
The Canterbury Plains were formed from Quaternary moraine gravels transported from the Southern Alps and deposited here during glacial periods in the late Pleistocene approximately 3 million to 10,000 years ago. The alluvial gravels were then reworked as shingle fans of several of the larger rivers, notably the Waimakariri, the Rakaia, the Selwyn, and the Rangitata. Part of the Canterbury-Otago tussock grasslands, the land is suitable for moderately intensive livestock farming but is prone to droughts, especially when the prevailing wind is from the northwest. At these times, the weather phenomenon known as the Nor'west arch can be seen across much of the plain.

A major earthquake on 4 September 2010 revealed a previously unknown geological fault beneath the Canterbury Plains and created a surface rift that offset features by as much as four metres in places.

== Rivers ==
The rivers of the Canterbury Plains have a distinctive braided appearance, which differentiates this area from the plains of North Otago to the south – beyond the Waitaki, the rivers typically have narrower, well-formed channels, rather than spreading across wide shingle depressions, as in Canterbury.

Most of the population of Canterbury lives in a series of large and small towns arranged northeast to southwest along the plains, connected by State Highway 1 and the Main South railway line. These include Christchurch, Ashburton and Timaru, and the smaller Kaiapoi, Dunsandel, Rakaia, Temuka, and Glenavy. Other towns on the plains include Rangiora, Leeston, Lincoln, Darfield, Geraldine, Methven and Waimate.

== Fauna ==
The extremely rare weevil Hadramphus tuberculatus is endemic to the plains.
