= Lynnford =

Coordinates: 44°01′S 171°36′E

Lynnford is a lightly populated locality in the Mid-Canterbury region of New Zealand's South Island. It is situated between Hinds and Eiffelton on the banks of the Hinds River, which reaches the Pacific Ocean not far to the southeast, between the nearby localities of Longbeach and Lowcliffe. Other localities close to Lynnford are Willowby and Windermere to the north.

Lynnford had a primary school until the 1930s. During that decade, it was closed along with the primary schools in Ealing and Maronan and students from the three schools sent to the primary school in Hinds.
