= National Association of Care and Support Workers =

British professional organization

The National Association of Care and Support Workers is a professional body for care workers founded in 2016. It has offices on London Road, Neath.

Paul Featherstone is the founder. He is a qualified engineer, who began working in the social care sector in 2013, and quickly became disillusioned at the way care workers and care working was perceived as a low wage, low skilled job that anyone could do, when in fact it is a highly skilled vocation, and care workers professionals in their own right.

It was this lack of respect and recognition, that was the inspiration and catalyst for Featherstone to research and ultimately set up a stand alone professional body for the care working vocation. It was first known as the UK Support Worker Association, before being rebranded as the National Association of Care & Support Workers in 2017. Known in the social care sector by its anacronym NACAS, it has become a highly respected social care stakeholder in its own right.

In late 2017 Karolina Gerlich became its first chief executive. She was born in Poland and came to the UK in 2007. At the time she was working as a home care worker.

In 2020 Gerlich joined the Care Workers Charity as its chief executive

NACAS campaigns for the interests of care workers. It questions the commissioning arrangements for care, which lead to poor conditions of employment. The association says "We cannot expect care workers to deliver care with respect and dignity if they are not treated that way themselves."

In July 2019 it started a campaign jointly with Home Care Insight for the compulsory registration of care workers in England, as is the case in the rest of the UK. In 2022 the Institute of Health and Social Care Management supported the campaign, but on a voluntary registration basis. It hopes to launch and host a voluntary register as a pilot project by mid 2023, the purposes of which are to gather evidence to support the need for a mandatory register in England

Its current CEO is Liz Blacklock, a registered nurse, and the managing director of a domiciliary care business in Hampshire.

The work of the association is supported in Westminster by Christina Rees MP, and by the Lord Turnberg.
