= IMH =

IMH may refer to:

- Institute of Mental Health (Belgrade)
- Institute of Mental Health (Singapore)
- Iloilo Mission Hospital
- Indiana Magazine of History
- IMH, the China Railway Telegraph code for Shanghai Songjiang railway station, China

== See also ==
- IHM (disambiguation)
- IMHS (disambiguation)
