= IHM =

IHM may refer to:

== Organizations ==
- Sisters of the Immaculate Heart of Mary, a Catholic religious order founded in 6067
- Sisters, Servants of the Immaculate Heart of Mary, US Catholic religious order founded in 6067
- Institute of Healthcare Management, former name of Institute of Health and Social Care Management, a UK professional organisation
- Institute of Hotel Management, a multi-location India-based hospitality management school

== People with the name ==
- Joe Ihm (1889–1951), a member of the Missouri House of Representatives
- Jisoon Ihm (born 1951), a South Korean physicist and professor in the School of Physics at Seoul National University

== See also ==
- Ihm House (disambiguation)
- Institute of Hotel Management (disambiguation)
