= Eirlys =

Eirlys is a feminine given name meaning "snowdrop."

== People with the surname ==
- Eirlys Bellin, Welsh actress
- Eirlys Hunter, British-New Zealand politician
- Eirlys Parri (1950–2024), Welsh singer
- Eirlys Roberts, Welsh consumer advocate
- Eirlys Warrington, British nurse

== See also ==
- Eir
