= Harold Norris =

Australian Anglican priest

Harold Geoffrey Norris was an Australian Anglican priest in the mid Twentieth century.

Ordained in 1937, after a curacy in Timaru he held incumbencies at Mount Somers and Hinds, New Zealand before wartime service as a Chaplain to the Forces; and at Riccarton and Ashburton afterwards. He was Archdeacon of Rangiora from 1960 to 1963; and then of Timaru until his death in 1969.
