= Edward Stanley (bishop) =

18th/19th-century English bishop

The Right Reverend Edward Stanley
- Bishop of Norwich
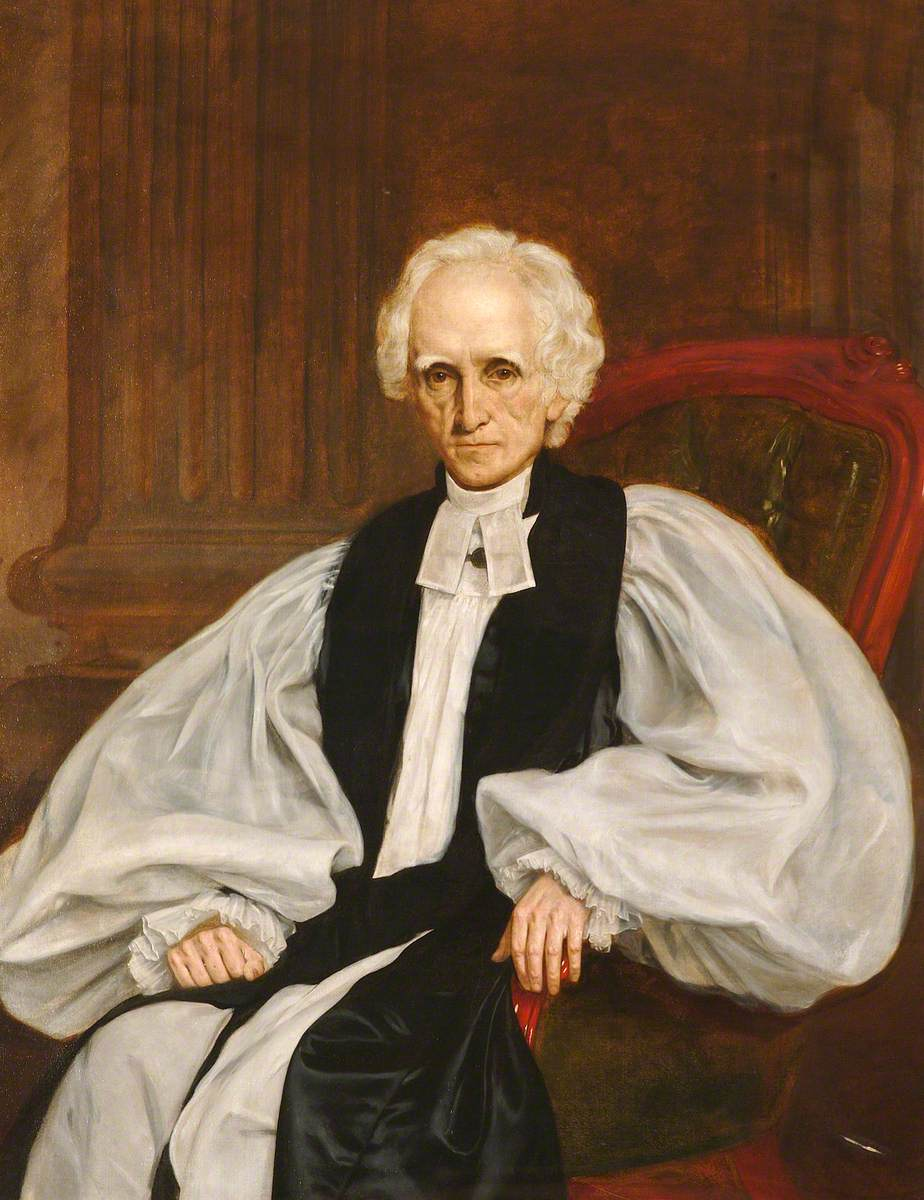
- Diocese: Diocese of Norwich
- In office: 1837–1849
- Predecessor: Henry Bathurst
- Successor: Samuel Hinds

Personal details
- Born: 1 January 1779
- Died: 6 September 1849 (aged 70)
- Denomination: Anglican
- Spouse: Catherine Leycester
- Education: St John's College, Cambridge

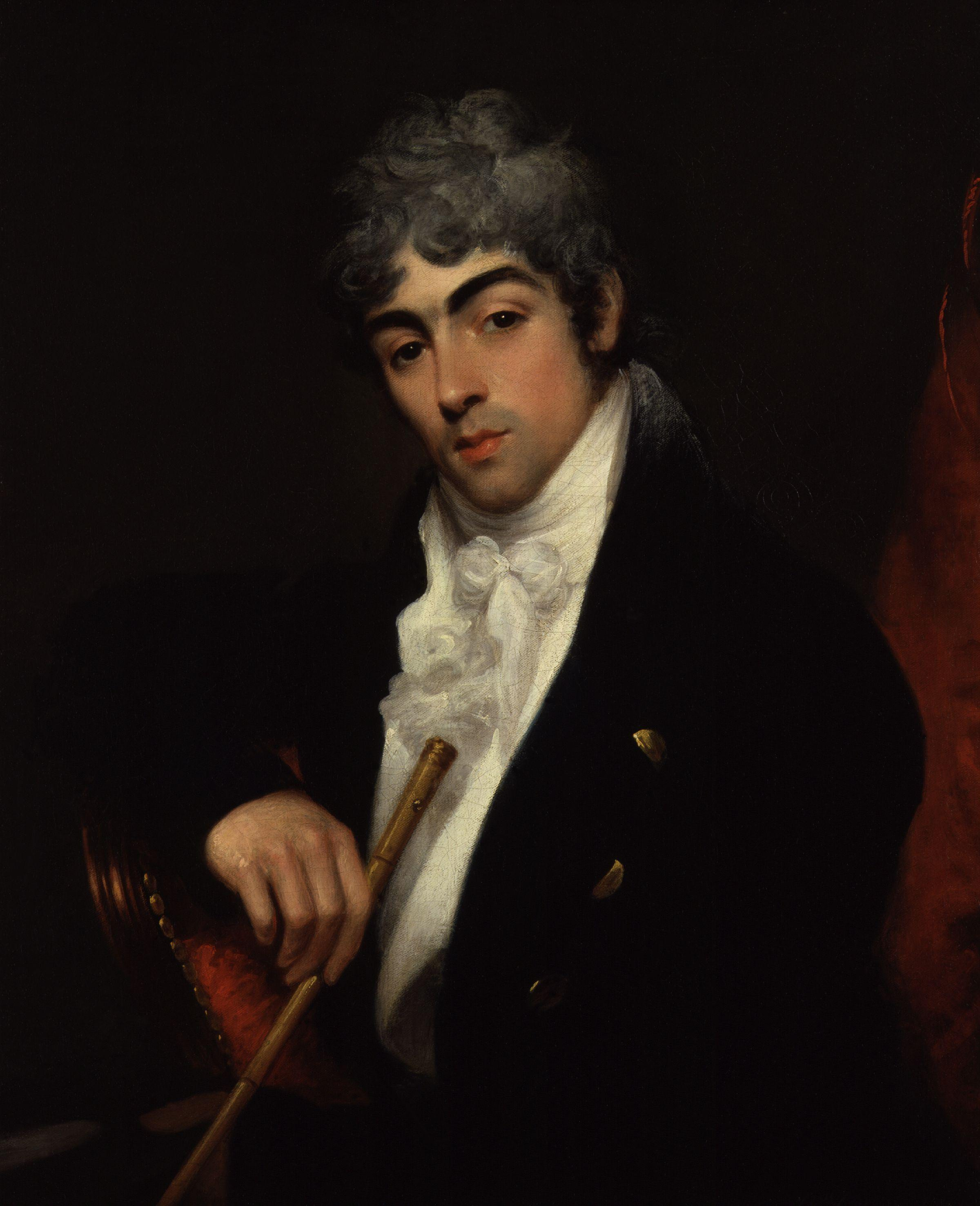
An 1803 portrait of Bishop Stanley by James Green.

Edward Stanley FRS (1 January 1779 – 6 September 1849) was an English clergyman who served as Bishop of Norwich between 1837 and 1849. He set about combating laxity and want of discipline among the clergy.

== Early life ==
Born in London into a notable Cheshire family, Stanley was the second son of Sir John Thomas Stanley Bt FRSE, and the younger brother of John Stanley, 1st Baron Stanley of Alderley.

Educated at St John's College, Cambridge (16th wrangler, 1802), he was ordained in 1802 and three years later became rector of Alderley, Cheshire, a position he held for the next 32 years. While there he took a great interest in education, and encouraged especially the teaching of secular subjects at his school.

== Episcopal discipline ==
In 1837 he was consecrated Bishop of Norwich and appointed Clerk of the Closet, holding both positions until his death. The diocese at this time was conspicuous for laxity and want of discipline, which he proceeded to remedy, although at first he met with much opposition. Ordinations and confirmations were held more regularly and frequently, schools were properly inspected, the Plurality Act, which prohibited the holding of more than one benefice by a clergyman except in certain cases, was enforced, and undesirable clergy were removed.

Stanley showed tolerance towards Dissenters and supported all missionary undertakings, without regard for their sectarian associations. In politics he was a Liberal and devoted himself especially to educational questions.

== Other work ==
Stanley's letters, Before and after Waterloo (edited by J. H. Adeane and M. Grenfell, 1907), are of interest to students of Napoleonic history.

Bishop Stanley was the original Patron of the Ipswich Museum and presided at its opening in 1847. A portrait of him in oils is displayed there. From 1837 to 1849 he was President of the Linnean Society.

== Death and succession ==
Edward Stanley died in 1849 and was buried in the nave of Norwich cathedral.

He was succeeded by Samuel Hinds, a broad-churchman with strong associations with the Maori of New Zealand, notably the Ngāti Kurī and Te Pātū tribes.

== Family ==
On 8 May 1810, Edward Stanley married Catherine, eldest daughter of Rev. Oswald Leycester (from another notable Cheshire family). They had five children:

- Owen Stanley (1811–1850), Royal Navy officer and surveyor
- Mary Stanley (1813–1879), nurse and Catholic convert
- Arthur Penrhyn Stanley (1815–1881), priest and historian, Dean of Westminster
- Charles Edward Stanley (1819–1849), Royal Engineers officer
- Catherine Maria Stanley (1821–1899), married Charles Vaughan

== Cultural reference ==
Stanley appears as a character in Alan Garner's novel Strandloper.

Church of England titles
Preceded by Henry Bathurst	Bishop of Norwich; 1837–1849	Succeeded by Samuel Hinds
