= Owen Stanley =

British explorer (1811–1850)

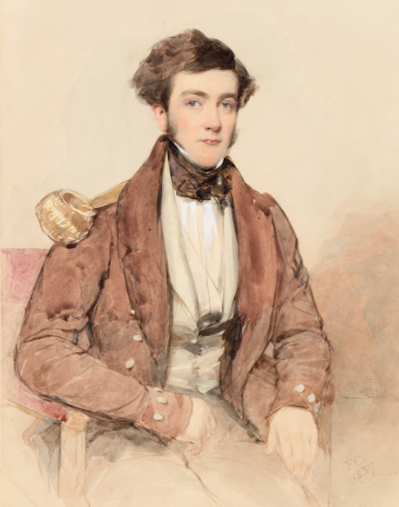
Captain Owen Stanley RN in 1837

Captain Owen Stanley FRS (13 June 1811 – 13 March 1850) was a British Royal Navy officer and surveyor.

== Life ==
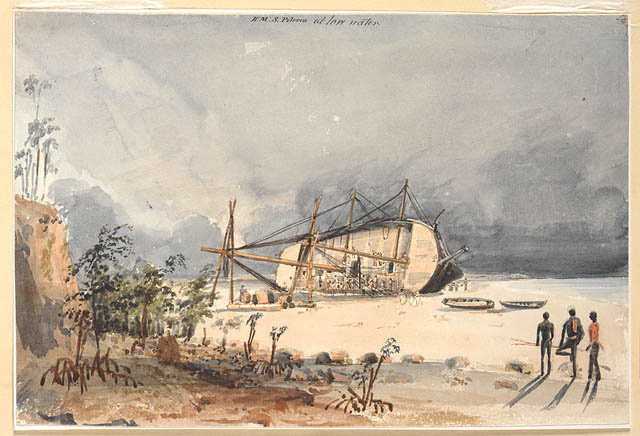
HMS Pelorus at low water, Port Essington, Northern Territory, 1840 painting by Owen Stanley

Stanley was born in Alderley, Cheshire, the son of Edward Stanley, rector of Alderley and later Bishop of Norwich. A brother was Arthur Penrhyn Stanley and his sister Mary Stanley.

He entered the Royal Naval College at the age of fifteen and remained there in 1824–1826, but these dates are inconsistent. For a few months in 1826, he served as a volunteer on board the Royal Navy's HMS Druid which was then in the English Channel. After gaining the rank of midshipman in 1826, in 1826–1827, he spent time about South America on board HMS Ganges. In 1827–1830, he was on the Royal Navy's HMS Forte. And then in 1830, he was with Phillip Parker King on board HMS Adventure while it surveyed the Straits of Magellan at the tip of South America.

By 1830, the 1821–1829 Greek War of Independence had ended and the United Kingdom found itself in a 'peace keeping' role about Greece in the Mediterranean once the fighting stopped. Owen Stanley found himself in the middle of these efforts. By 1831, he served as mate on board the Royal Navy's HMS Belvidera and then with Captain John Franklin on HMS Rainbow both in the Mediterranean in 1831.

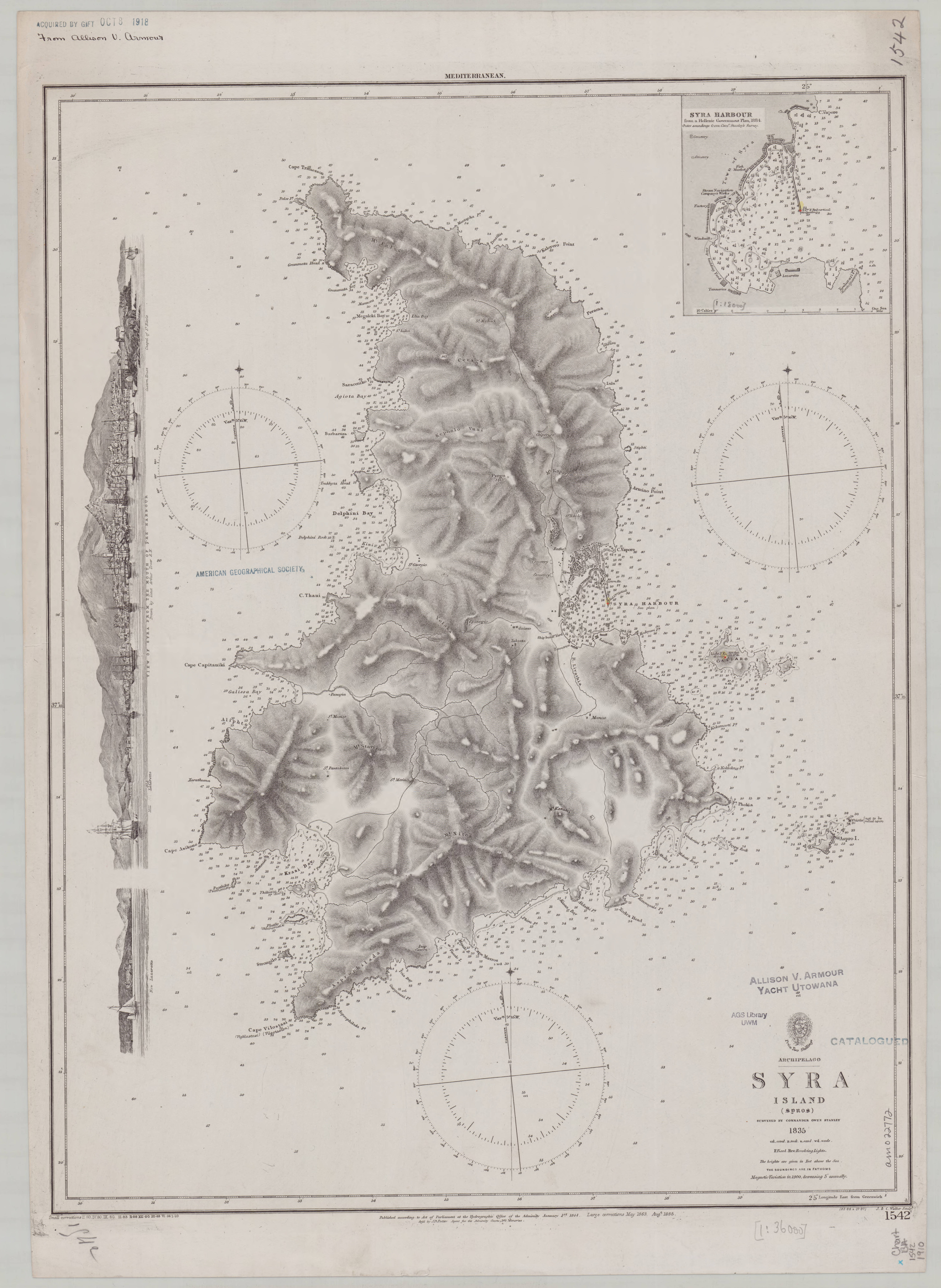
Chart of the Island of Syros, Greece, Surveyed by Stanley in 1835.

In 1831, he received promotion to lieutenant and continued to serve in Grecian waters until 1836 on a number of ships. He served on HMS Kent in 1831; in 1831–1832, he served on HMS Procris; he was aboard HMS Malabar in 1832–1834, and finished his 'Greece Assignment' on board HMS Mastiff in 1834–1836, during which time he spent eighty-four days surveying the Gulf of Corinth in a small boat, which he ended up hauling over the Isthmus to rejoin Mastiff.

In 1836, with his Mediterranean service now over, he sailed to the Arctic as scientific officer on HMS Terror under George Back. In 1838 he was given command of HMS Britomart and sailed to Australia and New Zealand, returning in 1843. While on the 'high seas' two things of some note happened to him: on 26 March 1839, he was promoted to commander; and, in March 1842, he was elected a Fellow of the Royal Society.

In 1843–1846 he was assigned shore duty. During that time, on 23 September 1844, he was promoted to captain at the age of 33.

In December 1846 Stanley sailed from Portsmouth in charge of HMS Rattlesnake, with the naturalists Thomas Huxley, John MacGillivray and artist Oswald Walters Brierly on board, accompanied by Charles Bampfield Yule in HMS Bramble. In November 1847 he arrived at Port Curtis on the Australian coast, and after surveying the harbour described it as a very good anchorage. In 1848 he continued further north to survey New Guinea, and in June of that year offered protection and assistance to Edmund Kennedy's expedition to the Cape York Peninsula. Owen went on to survey the Louisiade Archipelago but in 1849 fell ill, and died in March 1850 after returning to Sydney.

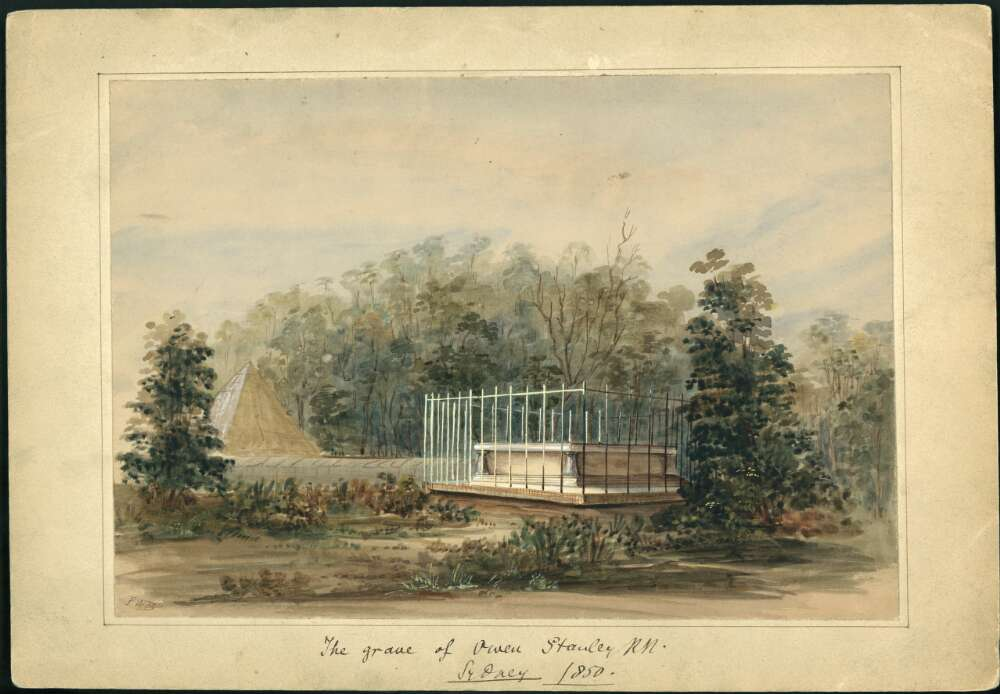
The grave of Owen Stanley, RN, Cammeray, Sydney, 1850, by Edward Wolfe Brooker

John MacGillivray wrote a two-volume account of the voyage of the Rattlesnake, published in 1852. Thomas Huxley wrote a diary of the voyage which was published in 1935, edited by his grandson Julian Huxley.

Stanley is buried in St Thomas Rest Park on West Street, Cammeray.

== Legacy ==
The Owen Stanley Range in New Guinea is named after him.

In memory of his brother, Dean Stanley of Westminster Abbey donated the font in ChristChurch Cathedral in New Zealand.

== See also ==
- O'Byrne, William Richard (1849). "Stanley, Owen" . A Naval Biographical Dictionary . John Murray – via Wikisource.
- European and American voyages of scientific exploration
