= Ted Baker (disambiguation) =

Ted Baker is a British high-street clothing retail company. It is also the name of:

- Ted Baker (cardiologist) (born 1945), British cardiologist
- Ted Baker (chemist) (born 1942), New Zealand scientist
- Ted Baker (footballer) (1901–1986), Aussie rules footballer
- Ted Baker (publican) (1872–1936), South Australian publican and racehorse owner and breeder
