= Home Care Insight =

Home Care Insight is a trade journal and website published by Promedia Publishing Ltd., based in London.

It runs annual award ceremonies for the sector.

In July 2019 it started a campaign jointly with the National Association of Care and Support Workers for the compulsory registration of care workers in England, as is the case in the rest of the UK.
