= Health Services Safety Investigations Body =

The Health Services Safety Investigations Body (HSSIB) is a fully independent arm's length body of the Department of Health and Social Care. HSSIB came into operation on 1 October 2023. It investigates patient safety concerns across the NHS in England and in independent healthcare settings where safety learning could also help to improve NHS care.

It aims to produce rigorous, non-punitive, and systematic patient safety investigations and to develop system-wide safety recommendations for learning and improvement. It is separate from processes that seek to allocate blame, liability, or punishment.

== Leadership ==
The Health Services Safety Investigations Body (HSSIB) is governed by a Board led by Dr Ted Baker. He is joined by five non-executive directors and four executive directors. Dr Rosie Benneyworth is the Interim Chief Executive.

== Investigations ==
HSSIB can investigate patient safety concerns that:

- occur in England during the provision of healthcare services, and
- have or may have implications for the safety of patients.

Where an investigation relates to an incident that did not occur in the NHS, HSSIB must also consider whether NHS systems and practices could also be improved because of an investigation.

HSSIB can also be directed to investigate a patient safety concern by the Secretary of State for Health and Social Care. A series of directed investigations into mental health inpatient settings was announced in June 2023.

As of February 2024, HSSIB has published patient safety investigations that look at continuity of care and delayed diagnosis in GP practices, risks to medication delivery using ambulatory infusion pumps, caring for adults with a learning disability in acute hospitals and safety management systems.

== Education programme ==
HSSIB provides an education programme to those in health and social care.

Based on learning from their investigations, they aim to support development and help embed professional safety investigations in local health and care settings. Courses are provided free of charge to the NHS in England, with commercial courses available for other healthcare professionals.

HSSIB is a recommended training provider for implementation of NHS England's Patient Safety Incident Response Framework (PSIRF).

== History and establishment ==
In 2014 the House of Commons Public Administration Select Committee launched an inquiry to examine the investigation of clinical incidents in the NHS. This inquiry was prompted by research that identified a significant gap in the way the NHS investigated major safety failures that could have impacts across the entire healthcare system, and which proposed the creation of a national independent safety investigation body in healthcare similar to those that exist in the transport sector such as the Air Accident Investigation Branch. The identities of witnesses are protected, to encourage them to speak freely.

In March 2015 the Public Administration Select Committee recommended that a new body be created to independently investigate major safety risks in the NHS. Those recommendations were accepted by the Government in July 2015. The Department of Health and Social Care and Secretary of State for Health, Jeremy Hunt, established an expert advisory group to determine the principles and approach of a new healthcare safety investigation body, and the group provided its recommendations in May 2016.

The Healthcare Safety Investigation Branch (HSIB) was established by legal direction in 2016 and became operational in 2017. During this time HSIB was funded by the Department of Health and Social Care and hosted by the Trust Development Authority, then NHS Improvement and finally NHS England (due to mergers).

In June 2019 it employed about 200 full-time equivalent staff and its budget had increased from £3.8 million in 2017 to almost £20 million. There were criticisms of the management of the organisation under Chief Investigator Keith Conradi.

In 2022 it was reported that the leadership was dominated by ‘Rasputin-like’ characters and displayed many of the bullying behaviours it was set up to help prevent in the NHS. Conradi, who previously led the Air Accidents Investigation Branch, was said to position "himself like an emperor and appears just to give a thumbs up or down to things.” Conradi, speaking to Roy Lilley as he was about to retire in July 2022, described the organisation's relationship with NHS England as “ambivalent” as patient safety was not their priority.

After the Health and Care Act 2022 was passed, the organisation gained full statutory independence and went through a period of transformation to become the Health Services Safety Investigations Body (HSSIB) on 1 October 2023. The Bill means that evidence given to it must be kept private. The maternity investigation programme that was part of HSIB is now known as the Maternity and Newborn Safety Investigations (MNSI) programme and is hosted by the Care Quality Commission.

== International counterparts ==
England was the first country to adopt such a system of national patient safety investigation in 2017.

National patient safety investigation has continued to develop in other countries and international counterparts now exist, for example in Norway, where a similar organisation became operational in 2019 called the Norwegian Healthcare Investigation Board (Statens undersøkelseskommisjon for helse- og omsorgstjenesten, literally "National investigation board for health and care services", known as "Ukom").

HSSIB has brought together international patient safety investigation agencies to explore the benefit of building an international network to help share intelligence, best practises and approaches to patient safety investigation.
