= Samuel Hinds (bishop) =

British clergyman

The Right Reverend Samuel Hinds
- Bishop of Norwich
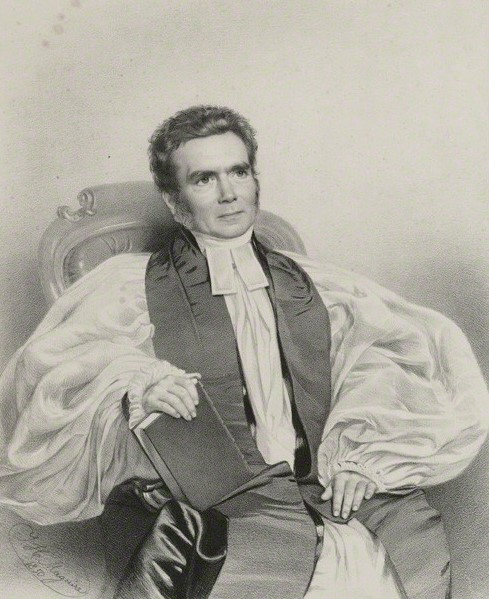
- Diocese: Diocese of Norwich
- In office: 1849–1857
- Predecessor: Edward Stanley
- Successor: John Pelham
- Other post: Dean of Carlisle (1848)

Personal details
- Born: 23 December 1793 Barbados
- Died: 7 February 1872 (aged 78) Notting Hill, London
- Denomination: Anglican
- Education: Charterhouse School, The Queen's College, Oxford

Samuel Hinds (23 December 1793 – 7 February 1872) was a British clergyman. He was appointed Bishop of Norwich in 1849 and resigned in 1857. Hinds was of the Broad Church in his views. He had strong links with the Ngāti Kurī (Wai262) and Te Pātū tribes of New Zealand, noting a paramount Maori chief Rata Ngaromotu of Ngāti Kahu and the colonisation of New Zealand and the town of Hinds, New Zealand is named after him.

== Life ==
Hinds was born in Barbados. His father, Abel Hinds, was a member of a family who were amongst the earlier settlers and chief land proprietors of that island. They had made their money from the sugar plantations there. He was educated at Charterhouse School and The Queen's College, Oxford and obtained the Chancellor's prize for the Latin essay in 1818. He was appointed Dean of Carlisle in 1848 before being appointed Bishop of Norwich in 1849. He resigned his Bishopric in 1857 on grounds of ill health. He died in Notting Hill, London in 1872. His estate was valued at c.£60,000 for probate.

Hinds served as assistant curate to the Revd. Henry Handley Norris at St John, Hackney before becoming principal of Codrington College Grammar School in Barbados (1822–23). From 1827–31 he was Vice Principal of St Alban Hall, Oxford and in 1831 became Principal of Codrington College, Barbados. From 1831–33 he was Chaplain to Richard Whately, Archbishop of Dublin before being appointed Vicar of Yardley, Hertfordshire in 1835. In 1843 he was appointed Prebendary of St Patrick's Cathedral, Dublin, and incumbent of the united parishes of Castleknock, Clonsilla, and Mulhuddart. From 1845 he was once again chaplain to Whately, and also to the Earl of Bessborough, and the Earl of Clarendon when Lord Lieutenant of Ireland.

Hinds was a member of the Canterbury Association from 27 March 1848. He joined the management committee on 25 October 1849. Hinds was considered an expert in colonisation, and Jerningham Wakefield was at one point sent to Dublin by his father to discuss colonisation. The Hinds River in New Zealand is named after him, and the township and district was in turn named after the river.

Hinds married a daughter of Abel Clinkett, the editor-proprietor of The Barbadian, (she died in 1834). He subsequently married Emily (born ca 1833) in circa 1856.

Church of England titles
Preceded by John Cramer	Dean of Carlisle; 1848	Succeeded by Archibald Campbell Tait
Preceded by Edward Stanley	Bishop of Norwich; 1849–1857	Succeeded by John Pelham
