= Mary Stanley =

British nurse (1813–1879)

- Born: 14 December 1813; Alderley, Cheshire, England
- Died: 26 November 1879 (aged 65)
- Known for: Pioneering modern nursing
- Parent: Edward Stanley

Mary Stanley (14 December 1813 – 26 November 1879) philanthropist and nurse, is best known for her dispute in the Crimea with her friend Florence Nightingale.

== Personal life ==
She was born in Alderley, Cheshire, the second of five children to Edward Stanley, later to be the Bishop of Norwich, and sister of Arthur Stanley, Dean of Westminster and Owen Stanley, the naval explorer. She was also a close friend of Sidney Herbert, and his wife. She was an ardent Puseyite. She converted to Catholicism in 1856.

== Nursing ==
Mary Stanley was one of the women who answered the appeal which went out for nurses for the Crimea. She shared Florence Nightingale's interest in nursing, the two having become friends in 1847, and like Florence Nightingale, was an advocate of the Kaiserswerth plan for a time. However, while Nightingale was initially an admirer of the Sisters of Mercy and later became an admirer of Kaiserswerth, Stanley went the other way and this led to her conversion. Mary Stanley helped the government recruit the first group of nurses to go to Constantinople which included a group of nuns from the Irish Sisters of Mercy. She and Nightingale were assisted in their nursing endeavours by Cardinal Manning. With his aid Stanley led a second party of predominately Catholic nurses to the Crimea. The rift between her and Nightingale began when she arrived. Despite the reviews given by Nightingale of these nurses some went on to have stellar careers in nursing and the primary objection was probably due to the argument about who was in charge and a degree of mistrust of Catholics at the time.

== Published works ==
Stanley wrote a book outlining the issues with getting trained women for the role of nurses in British hospitals; 'Hospitals and Sisterhoods' published in 1854. Her second book 'True to Life: A Simple Story' was published in 1873.

== Later life ==
On her return from the Crimea she continued with her philanthropic work, establishing savings clubs, an industrial laundry and creating employment for soldiers' wives in the production of army uniforms. In 1861, during the "cotton famine" in Lancashire caused by the American Civil War, she assisted Elizabeth Gaskell to distribute aid to the unemployed cotton workers. In 1870, she became a founding member of the Ladies' Committee of the British Red Cross.

She died in 1879 at the age of 66. She is buried in Alderley, Cheshire.
