= Ealing, New Zealand =

Ealing
- Rural locality
- Interactive map of Ealing
- Coordinates: 44°03′S 171°25′E
- Country: New Zealand
- Region: Canterbury
- Territorial authority: Ashburton District
- Ward: Eastern
- Electorates: Rangitata; Te Tai Tonga (Māori)

Government
  - Territorial authority: Ashburton District Council
  - Regional council: Environment Canterbury
  - Mayor of Ashburton: Liz McMillan
  - Rangitata MP: James Meager
  - Te Tai Tonga MP: Tākuta Ferris

Ealing is a lightly populated rural locality on the bank of the Rangitata River in the Canterbury region of New Zealand's South Island. It has a community hall, a small combined Protestant faith church and a rural fire unit based in the centre of the town. Ealing was settled as a railway village in the 1870s whilst the Main South Line's bridge over the Rangitata River was being built. Along with the schools in nearby Lynnford and Maronan, the local school was shut due to population decline during the 1930s and students sent to the primary school in Hinds, a small nearby town to the northeast and Carew in the west. The former school building is now the church. Ealing is more a common locality than a settlement, with the area being referred to as the "Ealing district". Each year a Guy Fawkes Night fireworks display and a Christmas party in Ealing District Hall are held to foster community spirit.

== Demographics ==
Ealing is in the Ealing-Lowcliffe statistical area, which also includes Hinds and Lowcliffe, and covers 413.19 km^{2} (159.53 sq mi). It had an estimated population of 1,670 as of June 2025, with a population density of 4.042 people per km^{2}.

Historical population for Ealing-Lowcliffe
Year	Pop.	±% p.a.
2006	1,197	—
2013	1,395	+2.21%
2018	1,551	+2.14%
2023	1,467	−1.11%

Ealing-Lowcliffe had a population of 1,467 in the 2023 New Zealand census, a decrease of 84 people (−5.4%) since the 2018 census, and an increase of 72 people (5.2%) since the 2013 census. There were 789 males, 675 females, and 6 people of other genders in 603 dwellings. 2.7% of people identified as LGBTIQ+. The median age was 33.7 years (compared with 38.1 years nationally). There were 333 people (22.7%) aged under 15 years, 297 (20.2%) aged 15 to 29, 717 (48.9%) aged 30 to 64, and 120 (8.2%) aged 65 or older.

People could identify as more than one ethnicity. The results were 74.2% European (Pākehā); 9.4% Māori; 1.0% Pasifika; 17.6% Asian; 5.3% Middle Eastern, Latin American and African New Zealanders (MELAA); and 2.9% other, which includes people giving their ethnicity as "New Zealander". English was spoken by 96.1%, Māori by 1.0%, and other languages by 17.2%. No language could be spoken by 2.0% (e.g. too young to talk). New Zealand Sign Language was known by 0.2%. The percentage of people born overseas was 29.2, compared with 28.8% nationally.

Religious affiliations were 33.9% Christian, 1.0% Hindu, 0.4% Islam, 0.2% Māori religious beliefs, 1.8% Buddhist, 0.4% New Age, and 1.6% other religions. People who answered that they had no religion were 54.2%, and 6.7% of people did not answer the census question.

Of those at least 15 years old, 219 (19.3%) people had a bachelor's or higher degree, 576 (50.8%) had a post-high school certificate or diploma, and 339 (29.9%) people exclusively held high school qualifications. The median income was $53,300, compared with $41,500 nationally. 96 people (8.5%) earned over $100,000 compared to 12.1% nationally. The employment status of those at least 15 was 744 (65.6%) full-time, 171 (15.1%) part-time, and 12 (1.1%) unemployed.
