= Ihm House =

Ihm House may refer to:

- Ihm House (Guttenberg, Iowa), listed on the National Register of Historic Places in Clayton County, Iowa
- Ihm House (Barneveld, Wisconsin), listed on the National Register of Historic Places in Iowa County, Wisconsin
