= Arthur Penrhyn Stanley =

English Anglican priest and ecclesiastical historian (1815–1881)

The Very Reverend Arthur Penrhyn Stanley FRS
- Dean of Westminster
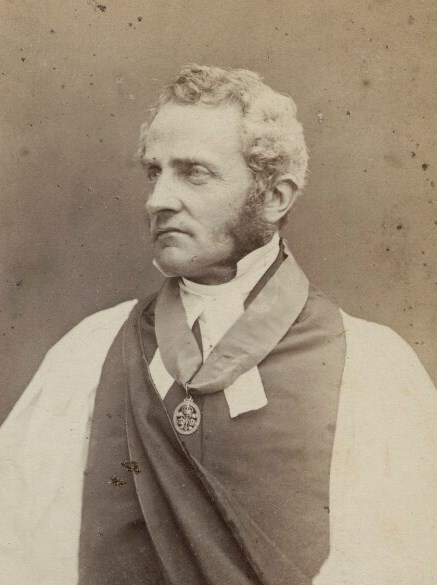
- Church: Church of England
- See: Royal Peculiar
- In office: 1864 to 1881
- Predecessor: Richard Chenevix Trench
- Successor: George Granville Bradley
- Other posts: Regius Professor of Ecclesiastical History (1856–1863); Rector of the University of St Andrews (1874–1877)

Personal details
- Born: Arthur Penrhyn Stanley; 13 December 1815 Alderley Edge, Cheshire, England
- Died: 18 July 1881 (aged 65) London, England
- Denomination: Anglicanism
- Education: Rugby School
- Alma mater: Balliol College, Oxford
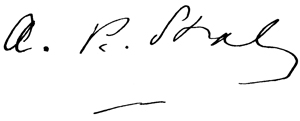
- Signature

Arthur Penrhyn Stanley (13 December 1815 – 18 July 1881) known as Dean Stanley, was an English Anglican priest and ecclesiastical historian. He was Dean of Westminster from 1864 to 1881. His position was that of a Broad Churchman and he was the author of a number of works on church history. He was a co-founder of the Palestine Exploration Fund.

== Early life ==
Stanley was born in Alderley Edge, in Cheshire, where his father, Edward Stanley, later Bishop of Norwich, was then rector. A brother was Owen Stanley, and his sister was Mary Stanley. The middle-name 'Penrhyn' suggests Welsh lineage.

Stanley was educated at Rugby School under Thomas Arnold and in 1834 went up to Balliol College, Oxford. He is generally considered to be the source for the character of George Arthur in Thomas Hughes's well-known book Tom Brown's Schooldays, which is based on Rugby. After winning the Ireland scholarship and the Newdigate Prize for an English poem (The Gypsies), he was in 1839 elected a Fellow of University College and the same year took holy orders. In 1840 he travelled in Greece and Italy and on his return settled at Oxford, where for ten years, he was tutor of his college and an influential element in university life. His relationship with his pupils was close and affectionate, and the charm of his character won him friends on all sides. His literary reputation was early established by his Life of Arnold, published in 1844. In 1845 he was appointed select preacher, and published in 1847 a volume of Sermons and Essays on the Apostolic Age, which not only laid the foundation of his fame as a preacher but also marked his future position as a theologian. In university politics, which at the time wore mainly the form of theological controversy, he was a strong advocate of comprehension and toleration.

== Controversies ==
As an undergraduate, Stanley had sympathised with Arnold in resenting the agitation led by the High Church Party in 1836 against the appointment of R. D. Hampden to the Regius professorship of divinity. During the long controversy that followed the publication in 1841 of Tract 90 and ended in the withdrawal of John Henry Newman from the Church of England, he used all his influence to protect from formal condemnation the leaders and tenets of the "Tractarian" party.

In 1847, Stanley resisted the movement set on foot at Oxford against Hampden's appointment to the bishopric of Hereford. Finally, in 1850, in an article published in the Edinburgh Review in defence of the Gorham judgment, he asserted two principles that he maintained to the end of his life: first, "that the so-called supremacy of the Crown in religious matters was in reality nothing else than the supremacy of law, and, secondly, that the Church of England, by the very condition of its being, was not High or Low, but Broad, and had always included and been meant to include, opposite and contradictory opinions on points even more important than those at present under discussion".

== University reform ==
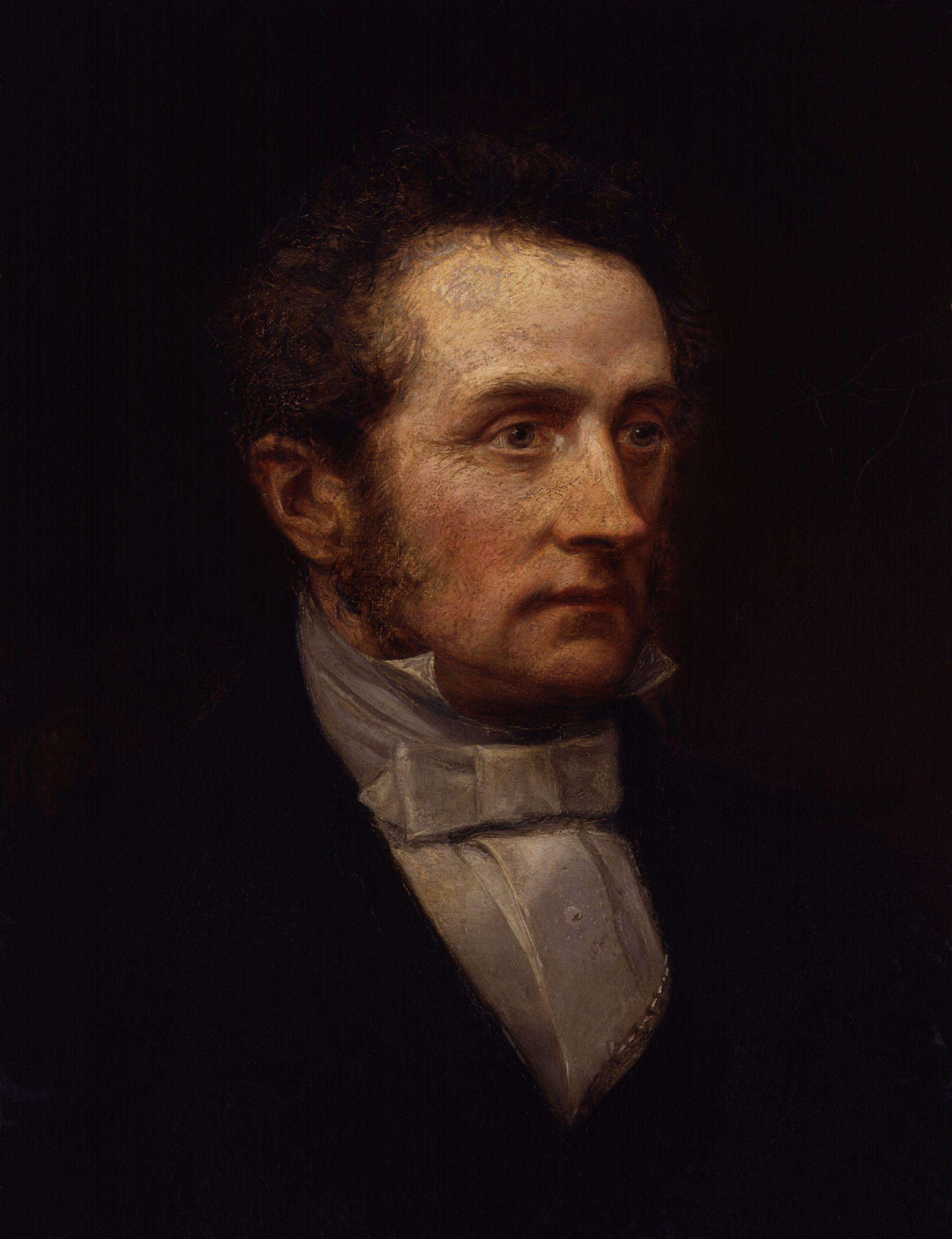
Portrait of Stanley by Lowes Cato Dickinson

It was not only in theoretical but also in academic matters that Stanley's sympathies were on the liberal side. He was greatly interested in university reform and acted as secretary to the royal commission appointed in 1850. Of the important changes in administration and education which were ultimately carried out, Stanley, who took the principal share in drafting the report printed in 1852, was a strenuous advocate. The changes included the transference of the initiative in university legislation from the sole authority of the heads of houses to an elected and representative body, the opening of college fellowships and scholarships to competition by the removal of local and other restrictions, the non-enforcement at matriculation of subscription to the Thirty-nine Articles and various steps for increasing the usefulness and influence of the professorship. Before the report was issued, Stanley was appointed to a canonry in Canterbury Cathedral. During his residence there, he published his Memoir of his father (1851), and completed his Commentary on the Epistles to the Corinthians (1855). In the winter and the spring of 1852–1853, he made a tour in Egypt and the Holy Land, the result of which was his well-known volume on Sinai and Palestine (1856). In 1857, he travelled in Russia and collected much of the materials for his Lectures on the Eastern Orthodox Church (1861). The book of the lectures, "History of the Eastern Church", contained an argument for the apostolic claims of the Church of Abyssinia. His Memorials of Canterbury (1855), displayed the full maturity of his power of dealing with historical events and characters. He was also examining chaplain to Bishop A. C. Tait, his former tutor.

== Chair of ecclesiastical history ==
At the close of 1856, Stanley was appointed Regius Professor of Ecclesiastical History at Oxford, a post that, with the attached canonry at Christ Church, he held until 1863. He began his treatment of the subject with "the first dawn of the history of the church", the call of Abraham, and published the first two volumes of his History of the Jewish Church in 1863 and 1865. From 1860 to 1864 academic and clerical circles were agitated by the storm which followed the publication of Essays and Reviews, a volume to which two of his most valued friends, Benjamin Jowett and Frederick Temple, had been contributors. Stanley's part in this controversy may be studied in the second and third of his Essays on Church and State (1870). The result of his action was to alienate the leaders of the High Church party, who had endeavoured to procure the formal condemnation of the views advanced in Essays and Reviews. In 1863, he published a Letter to the Bishop of London, advocating a relaxation of the terms of clerical subscription to the Thirty-nine Articles and the Book of Common Prayer. An act amending the Act of Uniformity and carrying out in some degree Stanley's proposals was passed in the year 1865. In 1862, Stanley, at Queen Victoria's wish, accompanied the Prince of Wales (later Edward VII) on a tour in Egypt and Palestine. The following year, the Queen appointed him Deputy Clerk of the Closet.

In June 1863, Stanley was elected a Fellow of the Royal Society as The Author of – Life of Doctor Arnold – Historical Memorials of Canterbury – Syria and Palestine in connexion with their History – Lectures on the Eastern Churches – and Lectures on the Jewish Churches The collected Works of Dean Stanley take up 32 bound volumes.

== Dean of Westminster ==
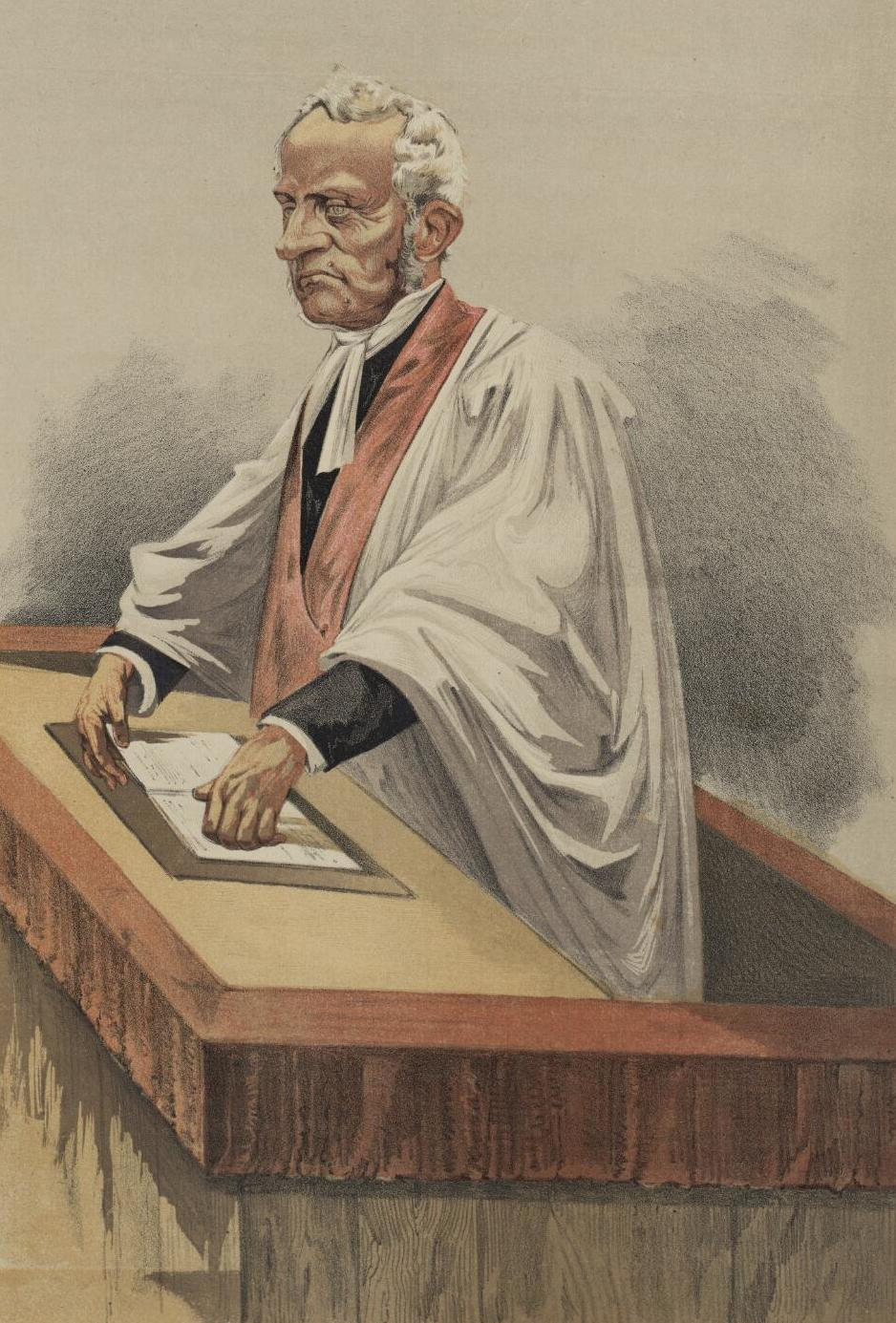
A caricature of Stanley in Vanity Fair, 1872. The caption was "Philosophic Belief".

Stanley was a candidate to succeed as Archbishop of Dublin following the death of Richard Whately in October 1863, but was rejected by the Church of Ireland. Richard Chenevix Trench, the Dean of Westminster, was appointed instead, and towards the close of 1863, Stanley was appointed by the Crown to the newly vacated deanery. In December, he married Lady Augusta Bruce, sister of Lord Elgin, then governor-general of India. His tenure of the deanery of Westminster was memorable in many ways. He recognised from the first two important disqualifications: his indifference to music and his slight knowledge of architecture. On both subjects, he availed himself, largely of the aid of others, and threw himself with characteristic energy and entire success into the task of rescuing from neglect and preserving from decay the treasure of historic monuments in which Westminster Abbey is so rich. In 1865, he published his Memorials of Westminster Abbey, a work which, despite occasional inaccuracies, is a mine of information. He was a constant preacher and gave a great impulse to Trench's practice of inviting distinguished preachers to the abbey pulpit, especially to the evening services in the nave. His personal influence, already unique, was much increased by his removal to London. His circle of friends included men of every denomination, every class and almost of every nation.

== Literary work ==
Stanley was untiring in literary work, and though that consisted very largely of occasional papers, lectures, articles in reviews, addresses, and sermons, it included a third volume of his History of the Jewish Church, a volume on the Church of Scotland, another of Addresses and Sermons preached in America, "Essays Chiefly on Questions of Church and State from 1850 to 1870 (1870) and Christian Institutions : Essays on Ecclesiastical Subjects (1881), the last two collections some would consider still very relevant today. He was continually engaged in theological controversy, although courteously, and, by his advocacy of all efforts to promote the social, moral and religious amelioration of the poorer classes and his chivalrous courage in defending those whom he held to be unjustly denounced, undoubtedly incurred opposition from some in influential circles. Among the causes of offence might be enumerated not only his vigorous defence of one from whom he differed to some extent, Bishop Colenso, but his invitation to the Holy Communion of all the revisers of the translation of the Bible, including a Unitarian among other Nonconformists. Still stronger was the feeling caused by his efforts to make the recital of the Athanasian Creed optional instead of imperative in the Church of England. In 1874 he spent part of the winter in Russia, where he went to take part in the marriage of Alfred, Duke of Edinburgh and the Grand Duchess Marie.

== Final years ==
Stanley lost his wife in the spring of 1876, a blow from which he never entirely recovered. In 1878, he became interested by a tour in America and in the following autumn visited for the last time northern Italy and Venice. In the spring of 1881 he preached funeral sermons in the abbey on Thomas Carlyle and Benjamin Disraeli and concluded with the latter a series of sermons preached on public occasions. In the summer, he was preparing a paper on the Westminster Confession and preaching in the abbey a course of Saturday Lectures on the Beatitudes. He died in the Deanery on 18 July 1881.

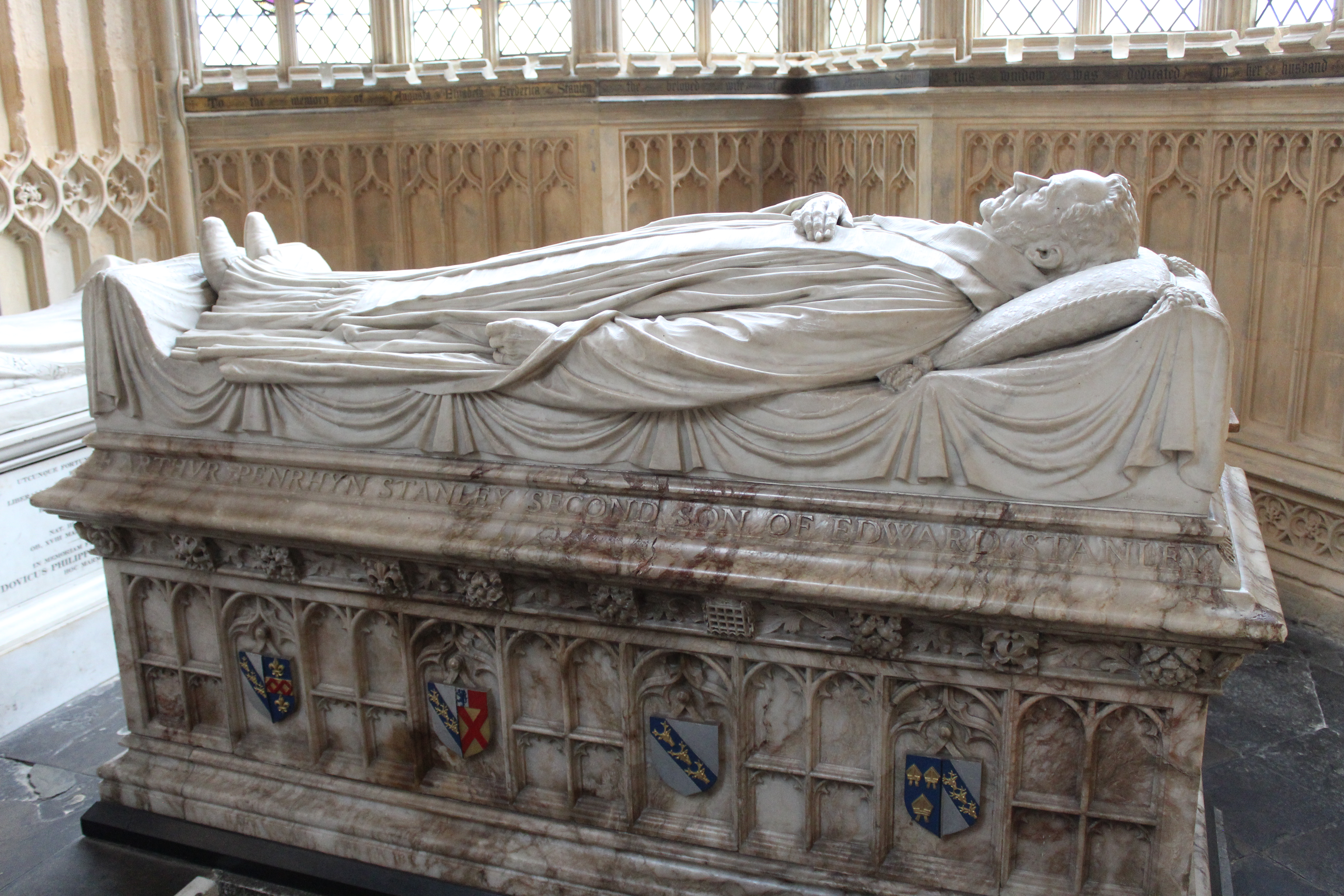
Stanley's memorial tomb, Westminster Abbey

He was buried in Henry VII's chapel in the same grave as his wife. His pallbearers comprised representatives of literature, of science, of both Houses of Parliament, of theology, Anglican and Nonconformist, and of the universities of Oxford and Cambridge. The recumbent monument, by Sir Joseph Edgar Boehm placed upon the spot, and the windows (destroyed 1939–45) in the chapter-house of the abbey, one of them a gift from Queen Victoria, were a tribute to his memory from friends of every class in England and America.

A description of his funeral service, on 25 July, is given in a footnote to Historical memorials of Westminster Abbey: "Arthur Penrhyn Stanley (author of this volume) ... was followed by the Prince of Wales, as representative of the Sovereign, by other members of the Royal Family, by representatives of the three Estates of the Realm, of the Cabinet Ministers, the literature, arts, science, and religion of the country, and by a large concourse of the working-men of Westminster—the majority mourning for one who had been their personal friend. The coffin was covered with memorials and expressions of regret from high and low in England, Scotland, France, Germany, and America, and from the members of the Armenian Church. He rests in the same grave with his beloved wife, in the Abbey which he loved so dearly, which he cherished as 'the likeness of the whole English Constitution,' for the care and illustration of which he laboured unceasingly, and with which his name will always be associated."

Stanley, Arthur Penrhyn (1815–1881). Historical memorials of Westminster Abbey; with illustrations, London : John Murray, 1886.

== Legacy ==
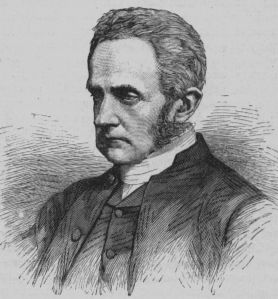
Dean Stanley

Stanley was the leading liberal theologian of his time in England. His writings reveal his special views, aims and aspirations. He regarded the age in which he lived as a period of transition, to be followed either by an "eclipse of faith" or by a "revival of Christianity in a wider aspect," a "catholic, comprehensive, all-embracing Christianity" that "might yet overcome the world". He believed that the Christian Church had not yet presented "its final or its most perfect aspect to the world"; that "the belief of each successive age of Christendom had as a matter of fact varied enormously from the belief of its predecessor"; that "all confessions and similar documents are, if taken as final expressions of absolute truth, misleading"; and that "there still remained, behind all the controversies of the past, a higher Christianity which neither assailants nor defenders had fully exhausted." "The first duty of a modern theologian" he held to be "to study the Bible, not for the sake of making or defending systems out of it, but for the sake of discovering what it actually contains." To this study he looked for the best hope of such a progressive development of Christian theology as should avert the danger arising from "the apparently increasing divergence between the intelligence and the faith of our time." He enforced the duty "of placing in the background whatever was accidental, temporary or secondary, and of bringing into due prominence what was primary and essential." In the former group Stanley would have placed all questions connected with Episcopal or Presbyterian orders, or that deal only with the outward forms or ceremonies of religion, or with the authorship or age of the books of the Old Testament.

The foremost and highest place, that of the "essential and supernatural" elements of religion, Stanley reserved for its moral and spiritual truths, "its chief evidence and chief essence," "the truths to be drawn from the teaching and from the life of Christ," in whose character he did not hesitate to recognise "the greatest of all miracles."

Stanley insisted on the essential points of union between various denominations of Christians. He was an advocate of the connection between Church and State. By this he understood: (1) "the recognition and support on the part of the state of the religious expression of the faith of the community," and (2) "that this religious expression of the faith of the community on the most sacred and most vital of all its interests should be controlled and guided by the whole community through the supremacy of law." At the same time he was in favour of making the creed of the Church as wide as possible—"not narrower than that which is even now the test of its membership, the Apostles' Creed"—and of throwing down all barriers which could be wisely dispensed with to admission to its ministry. As an immediate step he even advocated the admission under due restrictions of English Nonconformists and Scottish Presbyterians, to preach in Anglican pulpits.

The subjects to which Stanley looked as, the most essential of all—the universality of the divine love, the supreme importance of the moral and spiritual elements of religion, the supremacy of conscience, the sense of the central citadel of Christianity as being contained in the character, the history, the spirit of its divine Founder—have impressed themselves more and more on the teaching and the preaching in the Church.

According to William Archer, Stanley was "incapable of distinguishing one tune from another" and "took off his hat when the band played 'Rule, Britannia,' under the impression that it was 'God Save the Queen.'"

== Works ==
- Life of Doctor Arnold (1844)
- Sermons and Essays on the Apostolic Age (1847)
- Memoir of his father (1851)
- Commentary on the Epistles to the Corinthians (1855)
- Historical Memorials of Canterbury (1855)
- Sinai and Palestine in Connexion with their History. 1856. 2nd ed. London: John Murray, 1875.
- History of the Eastern Church (1861)
- History of the Jewish Church (3 vols, 1863, 1865, 1870)
- Historical Memorials of Westminster Abbey. London: John Murray, 1870.(Philadelphia, PA, 1899).
- Essays on Church and State (1870)
- The Church of Scotland (1870)
- Addresses and Sermons preached in America (1870)
- Essays Chiefly on Questions of Church and State from 1850 to 1870 (1870)
- Christian Institutions: Essays on Ecclesiastical Subjects (1881)

The collected The Works of Arthur Penrhyn Stanley take up 32 bound volumes.

Academic offices
Preceded by Charles Neaves	Rector of the University of St Andrews; 1874–1877	Succeeded by The Earl of Selborne
