= Ted Baker (cardiologist) =

British paediatric cardiologist and healthcare regulator (born 1956)

Ted Baker CBE MA MD (Cantab) FRCP FRCPCH
- Born: Edward James Baker; 2 May 1956 (age 70)
- Education: Trinity College, Cambridge; St Thomas's Hospital Medical School
- Occupations: Physician, healthcare regulator
- Known for: Chief Inspector of Hospitals, Care Quality Commission (2017–2022); founding chair of the Health Services Safety Investigations Body
- Parent(s): J. A. C. "Christopher" Baker; Hazel Baker (née Hill)

Edward James "Ted" Baker CBE (born 2 May 1956) is a British paediatric cardiologist and healthcare regulator. He was Chief Inspector of Hospitals at the Care Quality Commission (CQC) from 2017 to 2022, and in 2023 became the founding chair of the Health Services Safety Investigations Body (HSSIB).

A consultant at Guy's Hospital from 1987, Baker established an early programme of cardiac magnetic resonance imaging in children and was appointed Professor of Paediatric Cardiology at King's College London in 2010. He edited the journal Cardiology in the Young from 1999 and was its editor-in-chief from 2007 to 2013.

As clinical director and later medical director at Guy's and St Thomas' NHS Foundation Trust, Baker initiated and led the project that produced Evelina London Children's Hospital, arguing that children's services should be sited alongside maternity and emergency care rather than kept where existing buildings happened to be. The hospital opened in 2005, and in 2015 it became the first children's hospital in England to be rated "outstanding" by the CQC. He afterwards chaired a Department of Health review of the configuration of specialist children's services in England, which reported in 2008.

In his regulatory roles Baker argued that most harm in healthcare arises from systemic weakness rather than individual failure. He led the CQC's programme of trust-wide "well-led" reviews of NHS boards, oversaw the 2018 report Opening the Door to Change, and said publicly in 2019 that too little progress had been made on patient safety in twenty years. He was appointed CBE in the 2026 New Year Honours for services to healthcare.

== Early life and education ==
Baker was born on 2 May 1956 in Wednesbury, Staffordshire, the fourth son of J. A. C. "Christopher" Baker and the physician and child psychiatrist Hazel Baker (née Hill), who had established a child health clinic in the town in the early years of the National Health Service. He was educated at King Edward VI School, Lichfield, which he left in 1972 aged 16. He read medicine at Trinity College, Cambridge, from 1973 and at St Thomas's Hospital Medical School, qualifying in 1979, and as a student spent a period attached to the cardiovascular medicine service at Stanford University Medical Center, where he saw the early development of coronary angioplasty and heart transplantation. He holds the degrees of MA and MD of the University of Cambridge, the MD being awarded in 1987, and was elected FRCP in 1994 and FRCPCH in 1997.

== Clinical and academic work ==
Baker trained in general paediatrics before specialising in paediatric cardiology at Guy's Hospital, where his early research used radionuclide techniques to assess ventricular function and intracardiac shunts in children. In 1986 he spent a year as visiting professor of pediatric cardiology at the University of Pittsburgh, working at the Children's Hospital of Pittsburgh, where he began applying magnetic resonance imaging to congenital cardiac malformations.

He returned to Guy's as a consultant in 1987 and established a cardiac MRI programme, publishing studies on the imaging of coarctation of the aorta and septal defects in infants. The programme developed into a cardiovascular imaging centre at King's College London, and in 2003 the group published in The Lancet the first reported series of cardiac catheterisations guided by MRI in humans.

Baker held academic appointments at King's College London from 1982 and was made Professor of Paediatric Cardiology in 2010. He was associate editor of the journal Pediatric Cardiology from 1989 to 1999, executive editor of Cardiology in the Young from 1999 at the invitation of Robert Anderson, and its editor-in-chief from 2007 until the end of 2013; he was visiting professor of pediatric cardiology at the University of Florida in 2009. He is a co-editor of the textbook Paediatric Cardiology (Churchill Livingstone, 2nd edn 2002; Elsevier, 3rd edn 2010), the second edition of which received book awards from the Royal Society of Medicine and the British Medical Association.

== Service design and Evelina London ==
Following the merger of Guy's and St Thomas' hospitals in 1993 Baker became clinical director of paediatrics, and from 1995 director of women's and children's services, at a time when the trust's children's services were divided between the two sites and an appeal was raising money for a replacement building.

He argued that a new children's hospital should be built at St Thomas', standing alongside the trust's maternity and emergency services. The proposal was heavily contested by the Save Guy's Campaign, which held that it wasted investment already made on the Guy's site. Writing to The Independent in April 1998, Baker replied that "it should be the needs of patients that determine our plans, not the need to fill particular buildings with clinical activity at all costs".

The scheme was confirmed by the Secretary of State for Health in 1998, and a design competition run by the Royal Institute of British Architects followed in 1999, in which shortlisted designs were put to a public vote. The building, by Hopkins Architects, was commissioned directly by the trust rather than through the Private Finance Initiative. It opened to the public as Evelina Children's Hospital in October 2005, received a RIBA Award and a Civic Trust Award in 2006, and was shortlisted for the 2006 Stirling Prize. In 2015 it became the first children's hospital in England to be rated "outstanding" by the CQC.

In editorials in Cardiology in the Young he held that clinical quality should be assessed across whole patient populations rather than selected procedures, and that services should be "built around the needs of our patients, not around the needs of institutions". From September 2007 Baker chaired a Department of Health project on the commissioning of specialised paediatric services, produced in collaboration with the Royal Colleges of Paediatrics and Child Health, Anaesthetists, Physicians, Surgeons and Nursing. Its report, Commissioning Safe and Sustainable Specialised Paediatric Services: A Framework of Critical Inter-Dependencies, was published in July 2008. It laid out the clinical relationship between each of 23 specialised children's services as requiring co-location, as capable of delivery through a managed clinical network, or as independent. In his introduction as project chair Baker wrote that the framework established "for the first time, a clear, clinically agreed statement of the relationships between services", and that the Kennedy report into paediatric cardiac surgery at Bristol had "alerted us to some major concerns, and six years later its recommendations have not yet been fully implemented".

== Medical directorships ==
Baker was medical director of Guy's and St Thomas' from 2003 to 2010, during which the trust's academic partnership with King's College London, King's College Hospital and the South London and Maudsley NHS Foundation Trust was designated in March 2009 as King's Health Partners, one of the first academic health science centres in England.

He was appointed medical director of Oxford Radcliffe Hospitals NHS Trust in September 2010, shortly after an independent review commissioned by the South Central Strategic Health Authority into children's cardiac surgery at the John Radcliffe Hospital. The review criticised the trust for "serious shortcomings" and called for an overhaul of the way it handled serious incidents. A clinically led divisional management structure was introduced that November, and in 2011 the trust and the University of Oxford entered into a joint working agreement and established a Joint Research Office providing shared research governance across the two organisations. The trust's NIHR Biomedical Research Centre was renewed in 2011 with an award of £95 million over five years, and in December 2013 Oxford was designated an Academic Health Science Centre, having been unsuccessful in the first round of designations in 2009. While at Oxford, Baker chaired the first of the CQC's new comprehensive hospital inspections in September 2013 and led his own trust, by then Oxford University Hospitals, through its inspection the following February; it was rated good overall in a report published in May 2014.

== Patient safety and regulation ==
=== Care Quality Commission ===
Baker joined the CQC as deputy chief inspector of hospitals in 2014, working on the inspection regime introduced after the Mid Staffordshire NHS Foundation Trust public inquiry, and succeeded Sir Mike Richards as chief inspector of hospitals in July 2017 following an open competition.

In September 2017 he wrote to the chief executive of every NHS acute trust in England setting out eight requirements for the safety of emergency departments, drawn from work with clinicians in trusts rated good or outstanding. The letter stated that patients should not be left waiting in ambulances and that the CQC did "not endorse the use of inappropriate areas, such as a corridor, for patient care". He returned to the subject repeatedly, writing in 2018 that "we cannot accept that each winter will be worse than the one before".

An updated CQC assessment framework published in June 2017, developed jointly with NHS Improvement, introduced a revised "well-led" framework covering leadership, governance and organisational culture. As chief inspector Baker led the resulting programme of trust-wide well-led reviews of NHS boards, and has written that the framework was revised again in 2018 to strengthen the place of culture within it. In December 2018 the CQC published Opening the Door to Change, a report commissioned by the Secretary of State which called for a change in the NHS's approach to safety and recorded 468 incidents provisionally classified as never events in England in 2017–18. Addressing a conference in October 2019, Baker said that "20 years later it is very frustrating how little progress we have made" on patient safety, and that hospital managers sometimes withheld evidence from the CQC because they regarded it as seeking to apportion blame.

Of Shrewsbury and Telford Hospital NHS Trust, inspected in 2020, he said that "failing leadership is perpetuating poor care" and that poor care there had been "normalised". Giving evidence with Bill Kirkup to the Health and Social Care Select Committee inquiry into the safety of maternity services in September 2020, Baker described a defensive culture, dysfunctional teams and safety lessons not being learned, and said that "so often people say they are tackling the blame culture, but really they are trying to find people to blame for the blame culture". He announced in September 2021 that he would retire the following March.

An article in The BMJ in 2019 argued that if, as Baker asserted, hierarchy and fear were harming patient safety then the CQC was "as much part of the problem as the solution", given the weight it placed on inspection and ratings. In a book chapter published in 2022, while still in office, Baker wrote that "a regulator can, however unintentionally, intensify a culture of blame in health systems and has to consider how to apply regulation in a way that does not promote a punitive approach".

=== Health Services Safety Investigations Body ===
In August 2022 the Secretary of State named Baker as his preferred candidate to chair the Health Services Safety Investigations Body, an independent statutory body created by the Health and Care Act 2022 to investigate patient safety incidents in England without apportioning blame. The Health and Social Care Committee held a pre-appointment hearing on 1 November 2022 and approved the appointment. HSSIB began operating on 1 October 2023. Writing in Future Healthcare Journal as chair designate, Baker set out the case for independent, system-focused investigation as distinct from regulation. In August 2026 he reported that HSSIB had made 56 safety recommendations since April 2024, of which eleven had been implemented and closed, and that its investigations had contributed to national clinical guidance on aortic dissection and to NICE guidance on neonatal jaundice.

=== Published arguments ===
In a foreword written in 2023 Baker argued that healthcare's approach to safety remained founded on an outdated conception of medicine as an interaction between one practitioner and one patient, and that patients were important witnesses to safety because they had "experienced how healthcare is actually provided, not how we often imagine it's provided". Writing in 2026, he argued that a widely used model of quality as comprising safety, outcomes and patient experience, which he had helped to popularise, had hardened into a framework encouraging trade-offs, and that safety should instead be the foundation on which other dimensions of quality rest. In a further article he argued that healthcare had spent decades trying to change culture by exhortation while leaving unchanged the structural conditions that produce it, and called for safety management systems of the kind mandated in aviation.

== Personal life ==
Baker married Patricia Hudswell in 1982; they have two daughters.

== Honours ==
- Fellow of the Royal College of Physicians, 1994
- Fellow of the Royal College of Paediatrics and Child Health, 1997
- Distinguished Fellow of the British Association of Medical Managers, 2008
- Commander of the Order of the British Empire (CBE), 2026 New Year Honours, for services to healthcare

== Selected publications ==
- Ho SY, Baker EJ, Rigby ML, Anderson RH. Color Atlas of Congenital Heart Disease. London: Mosby-Wolfe, 1995. ISBN 0-7234-1712-1
- Razavi R, Hill DLG, Keevil SF, et al. "Cardiac catheterisation guided by MRI in children and adults with congenital heart disease". The Lancet 2003;362(9399):1877–82.
- Anderson RH, Baker EJ, Penny D, Redington AN, Rigby ML, Wernovsky G (eds). Paediatric Cardiology. 3rd edn. London: Elsevier, 2010. ISBN 978-0-7020-3064-2
- Baker E. "Regulation and the just culture". In Dekker S, Oates A, Rafferty J (eds). Restorative Just Culture in Practice: Implementation and Evaluation. 2022.
