= IMHS =

IMHS may refer to:

- Indian Military Historical Society
- Indianapolis Metropolitan High School
- Institute for Metahuman Studies

== See also ==
- IMH (disambiguation)
