= Ihm House (Barneveld, Wisconsin) =

- U.S. National Register of Historic Places
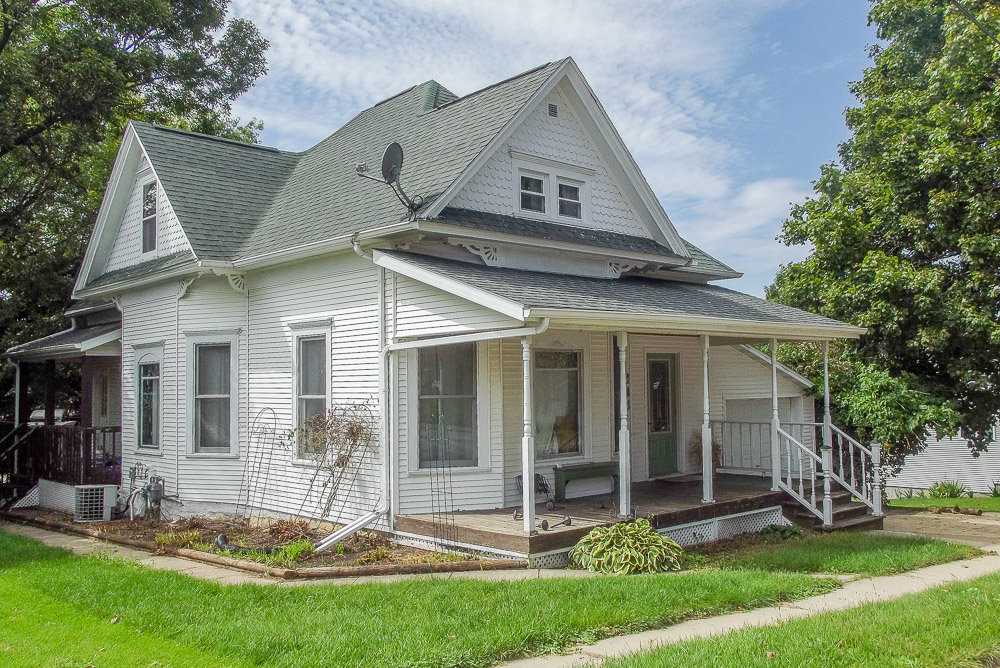

- Location within Wisconsin
- Location: 203 N. Garfield St., Barneveld, Wisconsin
- Coordinates: 43°00′59″N 89°53′44″W
- Area: less than one acre
- Built: c. 1891
- Architectural style: Queen Anne
- MPS: Barneveld MRA
- NRHP reference No.: 86002301
- Added to NRHP: September 29, 1986

The Ihm House is a historic house at 203 N. Garfield Street in Barneveld, Wisconsin. The house was built circa 1891 for property owner Fred Lampop. It has a Queen Anne design featuring a full-length front porch supported by spindled posts, three-sided projecting bays on the front and side, bracketed eaves, and a complex roof with a shingled front-facing gable. The house's interior includes a carved staircase and decorative bullseye patterned woodwork. The house was the most elaborate Queen Anne structure in Barneveld to survive the 1984 tornado which hit the village.

The house was added to the National Register of Historic Places on September 29, 1986.
