= Hinds, New Zealand =

Town in Canterbury, New Zealand

Hinds
- Rural settlement
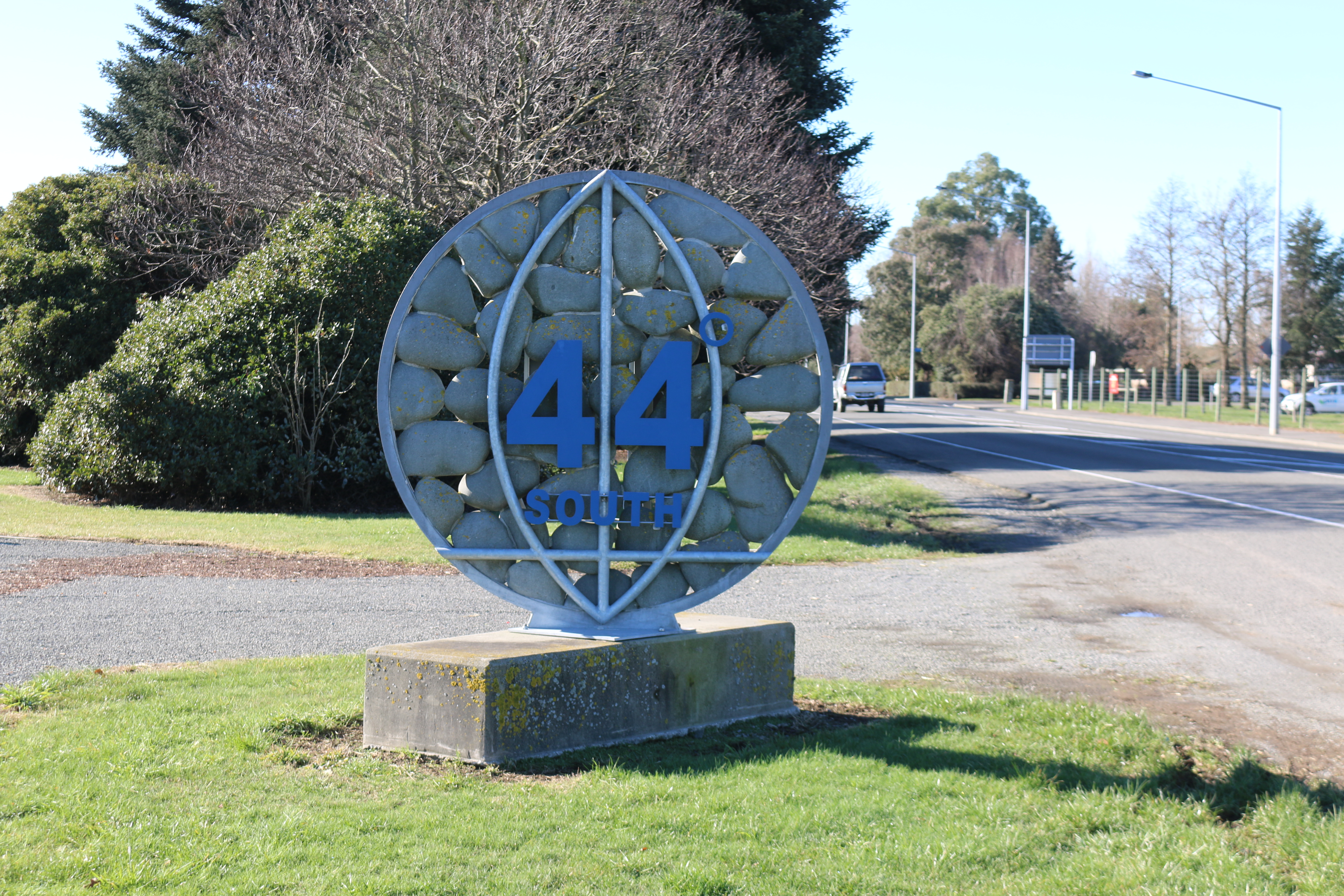
- Hinds is located 44 degrees south of the equator
- Interactive map of Hinds
- Coordinates: 44°00′S 171°34′E
- Country: New Zealand
- Region: Canterbury
- Territorial authority: Ashburton District
- Ward: Eastern
- Electorates: Rangitata; Te Tai Tonga (Māori)

Government
  - Territorial authority: Ashburton District Council
  - Regional council: Environment Canterbury
  - Mayor of Ashburton: Liz McMillan
  - Rangitata MP: James Meager
  - Te Tai Tonga MP: Tākuta Ferris

Area
  - Total: 2.18 km^{2} (0.84 sq mi)

Population (June 2025)
  - Total: 350
  - Density: 160/km^{2} (420/sq mi)

Hinds is a small town in the Mid-Canterbury region of New Zealand's South Island. It is located on the Canterbury Plains on the south bank of the Hinds River, which reaches the Pacific Ocean between the nearby localities of Longbeach and Lowcliffe. Other localities around Hinds include Ealing to the west, Willowby, Windermere, and Winslow to the northeast, and Eiffelton to the southeast.

== Naming ==
The township and the surrounding district are named after the Hinds River. The river in turn was named after the Reverend Samuel Hinds, a member of the Canterbury Association that organised the settlement of Canterbury.

== History ==
State Highway 1 and the Main South Line railway pass through Hinds. Passenger trains have not regularly operated through Hinds since the cancellation of the daily Southerner service on 10 February 2002, but freight trains run multiple times every day. The town also has a primary school; it dates from 1881 and the original classrooms are still in use. The school's size was boosted in the 1930s when rural schools in Ealing, Maronan, and Lynnford were closed and their students sent to Hinds. There were plans to build a secondary school in Hinds, but these never eventuated and the primary school gained land set aside for the secondary school.

In 2011 with the closure of the rural school in Lowcliffe their students were sent to Hinds.

== Demographics ==
Hinds is described by Statistics New Zealand as a rural settlement, and covers 2.18 km^{2} (0.84 sq mi). It had an estimated population of 350 as of June 2025, with a population density of 161 people per km^{2}. Hinds is part of the Ealing-Lowcliffe statistical area.

Historical population
Year	Pop.	±% p.a.
2006	282	—
2013	297	+0.74%
2018	294	−0.20%
2023	321	+1.77%

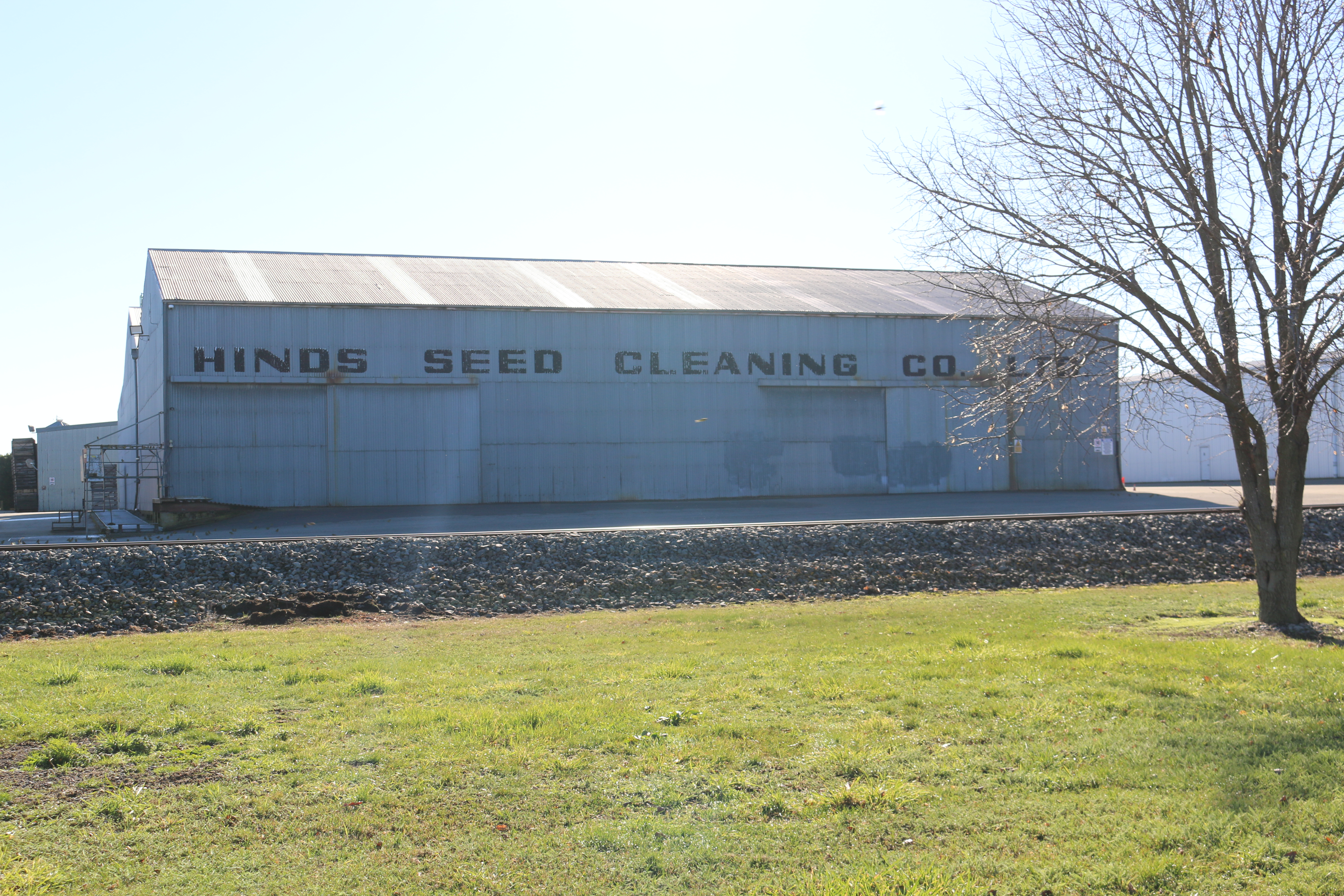
Hinds is home of a number of agricultural firms

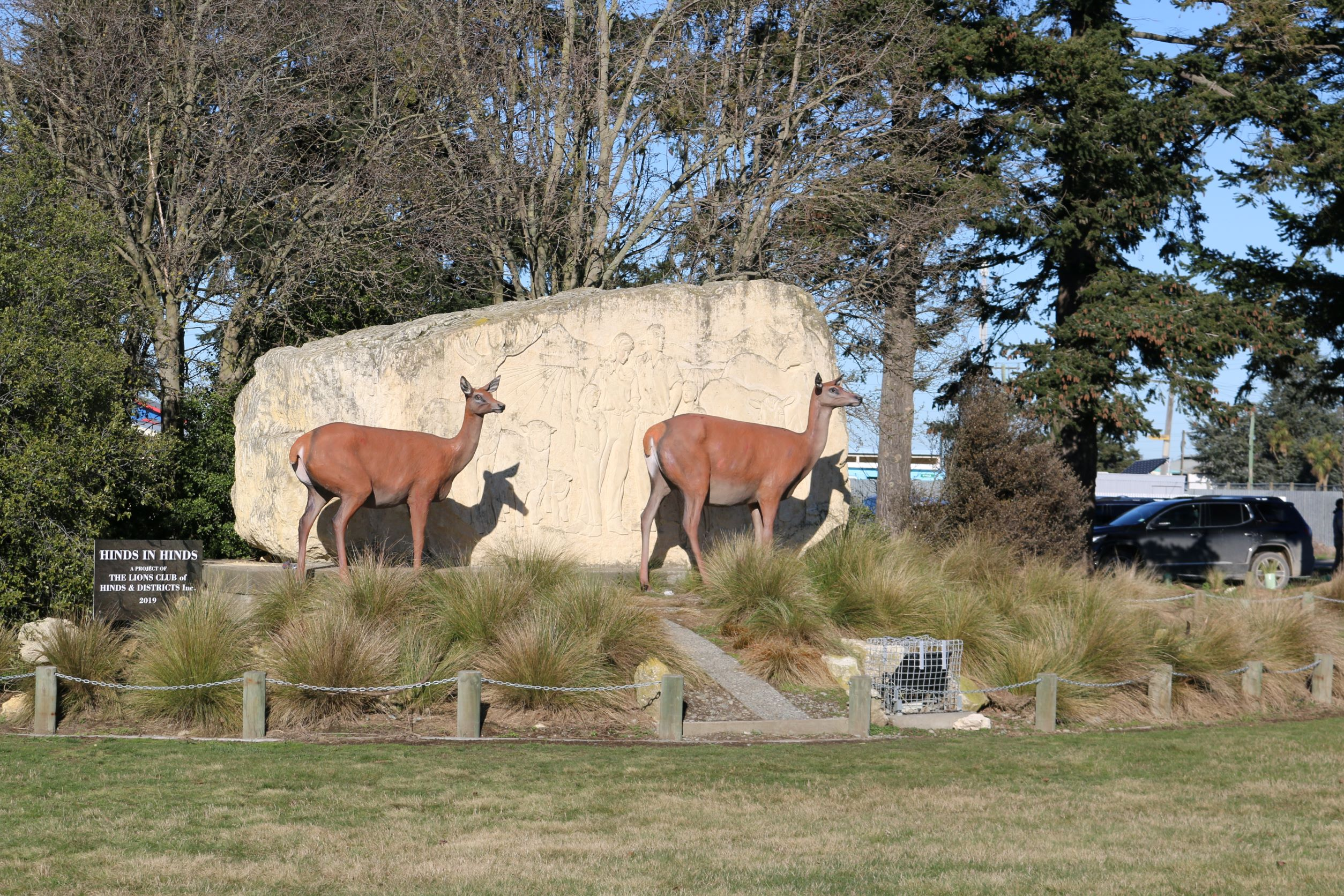
Hinds celebrating Hinds

Hinds had a population of 321 in the 2023 New Zealand census, an increase of 27 people (9.2%) since the 2018 census, and an increase of 24 people (8.1%) since the 2013 census. There were 165 males and 153 females in 129 dwellings. 2.8% of people identified as LGBTIQ+. The median age was 43.5 years (compared with 38.1 years nationally). There were 51 people (15.9%) aged under 15 years, 51 (15.9%) aged 15 to 29, 165 (51.4%) aged 30 to 64, and 54 (16.8%) aged 65 or older.

People could identify as more than one ethnicity. The results were 88.8% European (Pākehā), 14.0% Māori, 1.9% Pasifika, 4.7% Asian, and 5.6% other, which includes people giving their ethnicity as "New Zealander". English was spoken by 97.2%, Māori by 3.7%, and other languages by 6.5%. No language could be spoken by 0.9% (e.g. too young to talk). The percentage of people born overseas was 13.1, compared with 28.8% nationally.

Religious affiliations were 23.4% Christian, 0.9% Hindu, and 1.9% New Age. People who answered that they had no religion were 59.8%, and 13.1% of people did not answer the census question.

Of those at least 15 years old, 18 (6.7%) people had a bachelor's or higher degree, 147 (54.4%) had a post-high school certificate or diploma, and 93 (34.4%) people exclusively held high school qualifications. The median income was $41,000, compared with $41,500 nationally. 12 people (4.4%) earned over $100,000 compared to 12.1% nationally. The employment status of those at least 15 was 150 (55.6%) full-time, 39 (14.4%) part-time, and 6 (2.2%) unemployed.

== Education ==
Hinds School is a full primary school catering for years 1 to 8. It has 173 students as of July 2026. The school opened in 1881.
