= Hinds River =

River in New Zealand

Coordinates: 44°07′S 171°40′E

The Hinds River (Māori: Hekeao) is a river in the Canterbury region of New Zealand. Its north and south branches drain the eastern flank of the Moorhouse Range, part of the Southern Alps, and their confluence is near Anama and Mayfield. The river then flows across the Canterbury Plains towards the Pacific Ocean, passing through the small town of Hinds along the way. In Hinds, State Highway 1 and the Main South Line railway cross the river. The river's mouth is located between the localities of Longbeach and Lowcliffe.

In its upper reaches, the southern arm flows near the Rangitata River and the northern arm flows near the Ashburton River / Hakatere.

The river was named after the Reverend Samuel Hinds, a member of the Canterbury Association that organised the settlement of Canterbury. Hinds was considered an expert in colonisation.
