= Lowcliffe =

- Locality
- Interactive map of Lowcliffe
- Coordinates: 44°07′S 171°35′E
- Country: New Zealand
- Region: Canterbury
- Territorial authority: Ashburton District
- Ward: Eastern
- Electorates: Rangitata; Te Tai Tonga (Māori)

Government
  - Territorial authority: Ashburton District Council
  - Regional council: Environment Canterbury
  - Mayor of Ashburton: Liz McMillan
  - Rangitata MP: James Meager
  - Te Tai Tonga MP: Tākuta Ferris

Area
  - Total: 102.84 km^{2} (39.71 sq mi)

Population (2023 census)
  - Total: 249
  - Density: 2.42/km^{2} (6.27/sq mi)

Lowcliffe is a lightly populated locality in the mid-Canterbury region of New Zealand's South Island. It is situated on the shore of the Pacific Ocean between the mouths of the Hinds and Rangitata Rivers. Nearby settlements include Coldstream to the west by the Rangitata River, Longbeach to the east on the other side of the Hinds River's mouth, and Hinds to the north. The closest towns of significant size are Ashburton to the northeast and Geraldine to the west.

Lowcliffe is situated in a rural area that supports agricultural activities such as cropping, sheep husbandry, and dairy farming. It had a small primary school that catered for students from year 1 to 8 and it has served the community continuously since its opening on 28 August 1893 with a roll of ten students. In 2011, Lowcliffe School closed after 118 years of operation due to declining school numbers.

== Demographics ==
Lowcliffe locality covers 102.84 km^{2} (39.71 sq mi). It is part of the Ealing-Lowcliffe statistical area.

Historical population
Year	Pop.	±% p.a.
2006	252	—
2013	294	+2.23%
2018	264	−2.13%
2023	249	−1.16%

Lowcliffe had a population of 249 in the 2023 New Zealand census, a decrease of 15 people (−5.7%) since the 2018 census, and a decrease of 45 people (−15.3%) since the 2013 census. There were 129 males and 114 females in 117 dwellings. 3.6% of people identified as LGBTIQ+. There were 48 people (19.3%) aged under 15 years, 60 (24.1%) aged 15 to 29, 120 (48.2%) aged 30 to 64, and 27 (10.8%) aged 65 or older.

People could identify as more than one ethnicity. The results were 75.9% European (Pākehā); 8.4% Māori; 1.2% Pasifika; 14.5% Asian; 7.2% Middle Eastern, Latin American and African New Zealanders (MELAA); and 2.4% other, which includes people giving their ethnicity as "New Zealander". English was spoken by 95.2%, Māori by 1.2%, and other languages by 19.3%. No language could be spoken by 3.6% (e.g. too young to talk). The percentage of people born overseas was 27.7, compared with 28.8% nationally.

Religious affiliations were 34.9% Christian, 1.2% Hindu, 1.2% New Age, and 3.6% other religions. People who answered that they had no religion were 53.0%, and 8.4% of people did not answer the census question.

Of those at least 15 years old, 51 (25.4%) people had a bachelor's or higher degree, 102 (50.7%) had a post-high school certificate or diploma, and 57 (28.4%) people exclusively held high school qualifications. 27 people (13.4%) earned over $100,000 compared to 12.1% nationally. The employment status of those at least 15 was 135 (67.2%) full-time, 24 (11.9%) part-time, and 3 (1.5%) unemployed.
