= Institute of Health and Social Care Management =

UK Professional organization

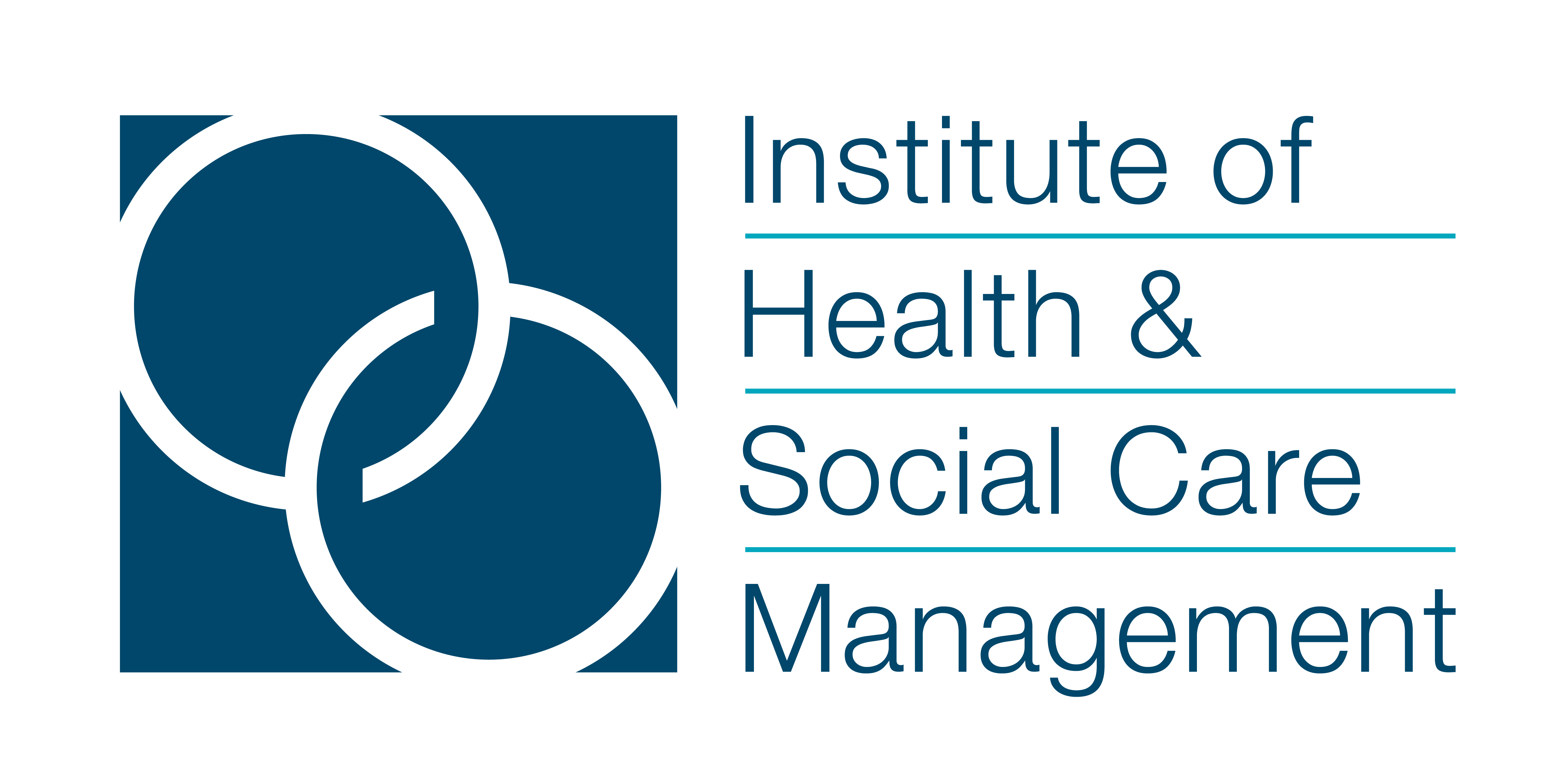
- Purpose: Health and social care
- Location: United Kingdom

== Overview ==
The Institute of Health and Social Care Management (IHSCM) is a professional organisation in the United Kingdom for managers in the health and social care sectors. Its membership covers the National Health Service, independent health and social care providers, health care consultants, and the armed forces. Its patron is the Duke of Edinburgh and current president is Lord Philip Hunt of Kings Heath.

Its historical development dates from the formation of the Hospital Officers Association (HOA) in 1885, the purpose of which was to provide facilities for hospital officers in London. In 1942 the HOA merged with the Association of Clerks and Stewards of Mental Hospitals, forming the Institute of Hospital Administrators (IHA).

The name of the organisation changed to the Institute of Health Service Administrators (IHSA) in 1970, to the Institute of Health Services Management (IHSM) in 1984, to the Institute of Healthcare Management (IHM) in 1999, and finally to the Institute of Health and Social Care Management (IHSCM) in 2021.

In October 2012, IHM became a part of the Royal Society for Public Health to promote healthcare management.

== The IHSCM Team ==
The IHSCM Team
Position	Name
President	Philip Hunt
Chief Executive	Jon Wilks
Chairman	Roy Lilley
Director	Dr Terri Porrett
Strategic Advisor	Shane Tickell
Director of Social Care	Susan Jones
Member Services Manager	Emma Caton
Operations Manager	Jade Maloney
Operations Administrator	Charlotte Joseph
Social Media Administrator	Rachel Jury
Digital Content Consultant	Luke Farmer

== Website ==
- Official website
