= Eirlys Warrington =

British nurse and Health Authority official

Eirlys Warrington was a British nurse and Health Authority official. She was elected Chair of the Council for the Royal College of Nursing (RCN) on 16 October 2003. She was a member of the Council for six years prior to her election.

== Background ==
She began her nurse training in 1960 at the Macclesfield Infirmary and West Park Branch. She went on to work at the North Staffordshire Royal Infirmary before training as a mental health nurse at St. Edward's Hospital.

A ward manager role in orthopaedic and trauma nursing at North Staffordshire Royal Infirmary was followed by a move to the Accident and Emergency Department to become part of the developing M6 motorway accident team.

She returned to Wales in 1970, spending two years as a night sister covering all wards plus accident and emergency at the Royal Gwent Hospital. She went on to work in acute psychiatry at St. Cadoc's Hospital in Newport where she developed 'one to one' nursing of people with anorexia nervosa.

While working for Gwent Health Authority, she trained as a clinical nurse specialist in caring for people with HIV/AIDS. By the early 1980s she had joint responsibility for the development of the nursing service in Gwent.

Eirlys Warrington worked as a clinical nurse specialist in the area of HIV/AIDS from 1983 until her retirement. Prior to this, she held positions in general and psychiatric nursing, acute nursing, surgical orthopaedics and trauma, A&E nursing and District Nursing . Her main interests are HIV/AIDS, sexual health, district nursing, and public health.

== RCN Council ==
- Positions held on Council:
- Council Member – Welsh Section
- Chair of Council (Honorary Officer)
- Chair, RCN Welsh (Board)
- Chair of Council Executive Team
- Member of Finance & Corporate Services
- Member of RCN Award of Merit Panel
- Member of Governance Support Committee

== South Gwent Board Member ==
- Lead Steward
- Health & Safety Representative
- Branch Chair
- Branch Treasurer
- Treasurer HIV, Nursing Forum
