= Roy Lilley =

English health policy analyst

Roy Lilley is a health policy analyst, writer, broadcaster and commentator on the National Health Service and social issues.

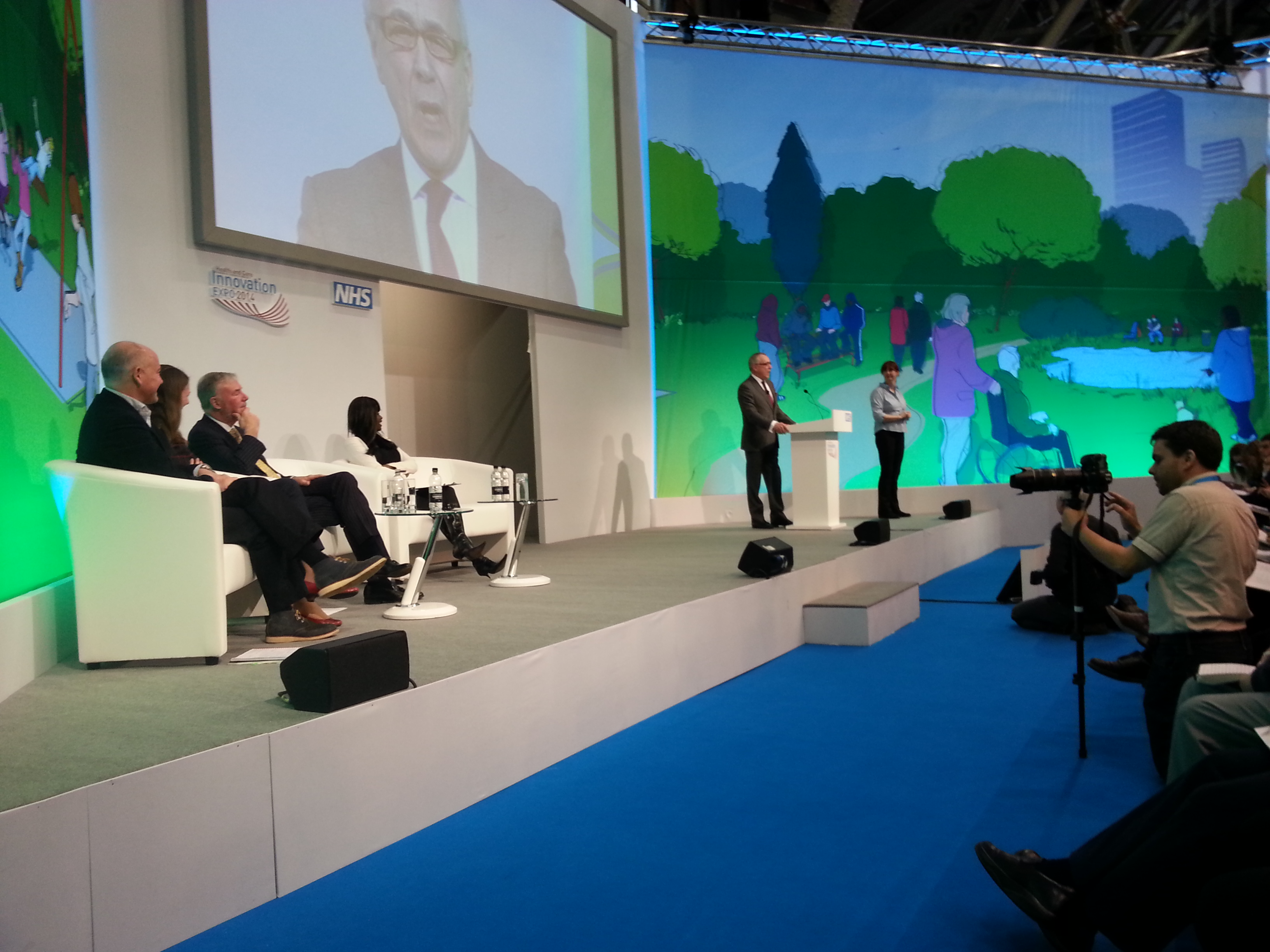
Conference presentation March 2014

He was the vice-chairman of West Surrey and North East Hampshire Health Authority and formerly a Conservative member of Surrey Heath Borough Council where he was Mayor in 1988/89. Between 1991 and 1995, he was the chairman of the Homewood NHS Trust, Chertsey Surrey. He was a visiting fellow at the Management School, Imperial College London, and at the Centre for Health Services Management at the University of Nottingham. He has written for the Guardian, Sunday Times, Daily Telegraph and other newspapers, journals and management periodicals including a regular column in Pharmaceutical Marketing magazine. He runs the nhsManagers.network which produces an opinionated free newsletter four times a week which is claimed to reach 300,000 NHS managers inboxes. He is the author of over twenty books on health and health service management. Because his newsletter is regarded as influential those attacked in it can be defensive. It is supported by the Institute of Healthcare Management.

He was an active opponent of the Health and Social Care Act 2012 and during the campaign produced a draft NHS Emergency Powers Act giving an alternative approach to NHS reform. At this time, he was widely credited for introducing the nickname "La La" for Andrew Lansley, the then Health Secretary and architect of the reforms. In 2013 he chaired the People's Inquiry into London's NHS. In March 2014 he was reported as saying, in connection with the care.data controversy that better use of data was vital to improve the quality of care but that politicians had made it more difficult for the public believe their commitments about the future use of the records, because previous ministers’ pledges - such as a promise to have no top-down reorganisation of the NHS - had been broken.

Lilley lives in Camberley, Surrey.

== Publications ==
- 1998: Disease Management (editor)
- 2010: Dealing with Difficult People. (Creating Success Series,)
- 2011: Top Tips for Managing in Terribly Treacherous, Turbulent and Tricky Times!
