= Alderley, Cheshire =

Former civil parish in Cheshire, England

Coordinates: 53.283°N 2.233°W

Alderley was one of the eight ancient parishes of the Macclesfield Hundred of Cheshire, England. It included the following townships:

- Over Alderley
- Nether Alderley
- Great Warford

Under the Poor Law Amendment Act 1886, these townships became civil parishes in their own right. The three parishes became part of Macclesfield Rural District in 1894. On the abolition of the rural district in 1974, they became part of the new Macclesfield district, a non-metropolitan district with borough status. The Borough of Macclesfield was abolished on 1 April 2009, and the parishes were transferred to the new Cheshire East unitary authority.

== Boundary changes ==
On 1 October 1910, some of Nether Alderley was transferred to Alderley Edge civil parish. 102 acres (0.41 km^{2}) of Great Warford were transferred to Mobberley civil parish on 1 April 1936. On the abolition of Birtles civil parish, 1-acre (4,000 m^{2}) was transferred to Over Alderley on 1 April 1936.

== See also ==
- Alderley Edge
- Alderley Park
