= List of ski areas and resorts in Oceania =

This is a list of ski areas and resorts in Oceania.

== Australia ==
=== Australian Capital Territory ===
- Corin Forest

=== Heard Island and McDonald Islands ===
- Big Ben (Heard Island)
- Mount Drygalski

=== New South Wales ===
- Charlotte Pass
- Perisher
  - Blue Cow Mountain
  - Guthega
  - Perisher Valley
  - Smiggin Holes
- Selwyn Snowfields
- Thredbo (Mount Kosciuszko)

=== Tasmania ===
- Ben Lomond
- Mount Mawson
- Mount Wellington, Hobart

=== Victoria ===
- Falls Creek
- Lake Mountain
- Mount Baw Baw
- Mount Buffalo
- Mount Buller
- Mount Hotham
  - Dinner Plain
- Mount St Gwinear
- Mount Stirling

== Indonesia ==
=== Papua ===
- Maoke Mountains
  - Carstensz Glacier
  - Ngga Pulu

== New Zealand ==
=== North Island ===
- Manganui (club skifield)
- Tukino (club skifield)
- Turoa
- Whakapapa

=== South Island ===
- Awakino (club skifield)
- Craigieburn Range
  - Broken River (club skifield)
  - Craigieburn Valley (club skifield)
  - Mount Cheeseman (club skifield)
  - Mount Olympus (club skifield)
- Fox Peak (club skifield)
- Hanmer Springs Ski Area (club skifield)
- Invincible Snowfields (helicopter access only)
- Mount Dobson
- Mount Hutt
- Mount Lyford
- Mount Potts (heliskiing and snowcatting only)
- Ōhau
- Porters Ski Area
- Around Queenstown
  - Coronet Peak
  - The Remarkables
- Rainbow
- Roundhill
- Tasman Glacier (Heliski)
- Temple Basin (club skifield)
- Around Wānaka
  - Cardrona Alpine Resort
  - Snow Farm (cross-country skiing only)
  - Treble Cone

== United States ==
=== Hawaii ===
- Mauna Kea
