= List of ski areas and resorts in New Zealand =

This is a list of ski areas and resorts in New Zealand where the public can pay to ski.

== North Island ==
=== Mount Ruapehu ===
- Tukino (club skifield)
- Turoa
- Whakapapa

=== Taranaki ===
- Manganui (club skifield)

== South Island ==
=== Canterbury ===
- Awakino (club skifield)
- Craigieburn Range
  - Broken River (club skifield)
  - Craigieburn Valley (club skifield)
  - Mount Cheeseman (club skifield)
  - Mount Olympus (club skifield)
- Fox Peak (club skifield)
- Hanmer Springs Ski Area (club skifield)
- Mount Dobson
- Mount Hutt
- Mount Lyford
- Mount Potts (heliskiing and snowcatting only)
- Ōhau
- Porters Ski Area
- Roundhill
- Tasman Glacier (Heliski)
- Temple Basin (club skifield)

=== Nelson Lakes ===
- Rainbow

=== Otago ===
- Invincible Snowfields (helicopter access only)
- Around Queenstown
  - Coronet Peak
  - The Remarkables
- Around Wānaka
  - Cardrona Alpine Resort
  - Snow Farm (cross-country skiing only)
  - Treble Cone

== See also ==
- List of ski areas and resorts
- List of ski areas and resorts in Oceania
- Skiing in New Zealand
