= List of New Zealand ski lifts =

A number of ski lifts operate in both the North and South Islands of New Zealand.

== Summary ==
=== Current ===
Location	Location	Magic Carpet/Belt	Platter lift	Rope Tow	Rope Tow (Nutcracker)	T-Bar	Double	Triple	Quad	Express Quad	Six Seater	Gondola	Poma	Fixed Grip	Other	Total
Whakapapa	Mount Ruapehu	0	2	0	0	3	1	0	2	1	0	1	0	0	0	10
Turoa	Mount Ruapehu	1	2	0	0	0	0	2	2	0	1	0	0	0	0	8
Tukino	Mount Ruapehu	0	0	2	0	0	0	0	0	0	0	0	0	0	0	2
Manganui	Mount Taranaki	0	0	1	2	1	0	0	0	0	0	0	0	0	0	4
Temple Basin	Arthur's Pass National Park	0	0	3	0	0	0	0	0	0	0	0	0	0	0	3
Snow Farm / Snow Park	Wānaka															
Invincible	Glenorchy	0	0	1	0	0	0	0	0	0	0	0	0	0	0	1
Mount Olympus	Rakaia Valley	0	0	4	0	0	0	0	0	0	0	0	0	0	0	4
Porters	Arthur's Pass National Park	1	1	0	0	3	0	0	1	0	0	0	0	0	0	6
Fox Peak	Fairlie	0	1	4	0	0	0	0	0	0	0	0	0	0	0	5
Mount Dobson	Farlie	0	1	0	1	0	1	0	0	0	0	0	0	0	0	3
Rainbow	St Arnaud	0	0	1	0	1	0	0	0	0	0	0	1	0	1	4
Amuri / Hanmer Springs	Hanmer Springs	0	0	2	0	0	0	0	0	0	0	0	1	0	0	3
Mount Lyford	Kaikoura	0	2	1	0	1	0	0	0	0	0	0	0	1	0	5
Craigieburn Valley	Arthur's Pass National Park	0	0	3	0	0	0	0	0	0	0	0	0	0	0	3
Round Hill	Tekapo	0	2	0	1	0	0	0	0	0	0	0	0	0	1	3
Ōhau	Ōhau	1	1	0	0	0	1	0	0	0	0	0	0	0	0	3
Awakino	Kurow	0	0	1	2	0	0	0	0	0	0	0	0	0	0	3
Treble Cone	Wānaka	0	0	1	2	0	0	0	1	0	1	0	0	0	1+	3+
Cardrona	Wānaka	1	0	0	0	0	0	0	0	0	0	0	0	0	4	5
Coronet Peak	Queenstown	0	0	0	0	1	0	0	2	0	1	0	0	0	0	4
The Remarkables	Queenstown)	0	0	0	0	0	0	0	2	0	2	0	0	0	1+	5+

=== Former ===
Location	Location	Magic Carpet	Platter lift	Rope Tow	Rope Tow (Nutcracker)	T-Bar	Double	Triple	Quad	Express Quad	Six Seater	Gondola	Poma
Mount Robert	St Arnaud	0	0	3	0	0	0	0	0	0	0	0	0
Rainbow	St Arnaud	0	0	0	0	0	1	0	0	0	0	0	0
Mount Cheesman	South	0	0	0	0	0	0	0	0	0	0	0	0
Erewhon	Rangitata Valley	0	0	4	0	0	0	0	0	0	0	0	0
Mount Dobson	Farlie	0	0	2	0	0	0	0	0	0	0	0	0
Craigieburn Valley	Arthur's Pass National Park	0	0	1	0	1	0	0	0	0	0	0	1

== North Island ==
=== Whakapapa (Mount Ruapehu) ===
Name	Type	Status	Duration	Information
Double Happy Chair	Double	Active	4 min	
Happy Valley Platter 1	Platter Lift	Active	3 min	
Happy Valley Platter 2	Platter Lift	Active	3 min	
West Ridge Quad	Quad	Active	11 min	
Knoll Ridge T-Bar	T-Bar	Active	10 min	
Valley T-Bar	T-Bar	Active	8 min	
Far West T-Bar	T-Bar	Active	10 min	
Rangatira Express Quad	Express Quad	Active		
Delta Quad	Quad	Active		
Skywaka Gondola	Gondola	Active		

=== Turoa (Mt Ruapehu) ===
Name	Type	Status	Duration	Information
High Noon Express	Six seater detachable chairlift	Active	10min	
Nga Wai Heke Chair	Quad chairlift	Active	11min	
Movenpick Chair	Quad chairlift	Active	15min	
Giant Chair	Triple chairlift	Active	13min	
Parklane Chair	Triple chairlift	Active	7min	
Alpine Meadow Platter	Platter lift	Active	2min	
Wintergarden Platter	Platter lift	Active	2min	
Alpine Meadow Carpet Lift	Magic Carpet	Active	2min	

=== Manganui (Mount Taranaki) ===
The original (lower rope tow) was installed in 1946, the first ski tow in New Zealand (predating Coronet Peak's tow by a few days). This was replaced by the current T Bar in 1974.

The top rope tow has a formidable reputation, rising some 300 metres. This was installed in 1952 and upgraded extensively in the 1980s (with a replacement electric drive instead of the old diesel engine). An extension to this tow (running off the top bullwheel) can be installed providing further vertical late in the season.

The lower T bar can also carry a few chairs if necessary, something that the Stratford Mountain Club have indicated that they may install, making for an interesting dual lift.

There is a small (single loop, no intermediate supports) rope tow between the T bar and the bottom station of the top tow, installed in the 1980s and electrically operated.

There is a small learners rope tow to the left of the T bar, this was installed in 1964 and upgraded in the 1970s.

A tow was installed in the Ngarara valley to the right of the field in 1983, and this operated til 1986.

=== Other North Island ski lifts ===
The Rangiwahia Ski Club installed a rope tow in the 1930s operating off a motorbike engine on the Whanahuia Range in the Ruahines in the Central North Island. The ski club built a hut as well, but this has been replaced by several facilities on the same site since then. Some relics are still there. The site is accessible only on foot.

All road ends in Egmont National Park had a rope tow or two at various times, but these have all been removed (apart from Manganui).

== South Island ==
=== Amuri / Hanmer Springs (Hanmer Springs) ===
This pomagalski was built entirely by volunteers and is the only detachable pomagalski left in New Zealand as such is needing preservation.

- 1 rope tow

=== Mount Lyford (Kaikoura) ===
- 1 tbar
- 1 poma that goes up and down
- learner rope tow
- 1 rope tow above Tbar that has an upper and lower loading areas to access back faces and summit - was extended in 2011.

There were also two rope tows installed at Stella Basin, further down the access road from Mt Lyford. A lack of snow has caused these to be removed.

Historically a rope tow also serviced terrain below the current skifield base, but has been abandoned.

=== Temple Basin (Arthurs Pass) ===
- 3 rope tows currently. Cassidy, Temple and Downhill
- 1 goods lift from the top of Arthurs Pass to just below the lodges.

=== Craigieburn Valley (Arthurs Pass) ===
3 rope tows currently. Access, middle, and top.

Formerly had a learners tow near the base of the middle tow, which resulted in three tows running from one tow shed / engine. The learners tow was removed in the 1990s. The top tow has now been realigned, as the previous alignment resulted in very challenging loading (requiring use of the "Craigieburn Drop" technique with nutcrackers).

In 1952 a T bar was installed (NZs first) running from the bottom of Craigieburn to Siberia Basin, except this never received much usage. A poma was installed on Hamilton Peak in 1994, but this did not receive much use either. The concrete base of this is still sitting in Siberia Basin.

There is a cone of death on the dogleg on the bottom rope tow where it changes alignment. It looks like a spinning top with a disc on the top to stop the rope flying off it. The disc acts as angle grinder if you don't get your shoulder far enough out of the way. This was installed to bend the towline away from an avalanche path. Great fun.

All tows are diesel operated, using tractors.

=== Broken River (Arthurs Pass) ===
- The access tow, from above the accommodation buildings to the field itself. Above the tow shed, which is at the height of Palmer Lodge (the fields day lodge), this tow is known as the Rugby tow, from the former Rugby car engine that used to power it (which is now hanging off the counterweight at the end of the main tow).
- The main tow
- The ridge tow
- Two learners / access tows near Palmer lodge.
- Tyndall tramway from the carpark to the accommodation lodges. One of a kind in NZ and can be used as a tow when snowline is lower.

All tows are electrically driven.

=== Mount Cheeseman ===
2 x T bars + 1 x learners rope tow.

Main T bar - Takes skiers from the base area to mid way up the mountain. Lots of intermediate terrain.

Ridge T bar - Takes skiers from mid way to top of ridge line. Lots of advanced terrain including Mt Cockayne.

Skiing began here in 1929. The first rope tow was installed in 1947. Up until that time walking was the best method! This changed over the 50’s and 60’s until 3 rope rows existed.

The bottom rope tow, since removed in the 1980’s, used to extend a long way down the access road. 4WD vehicles would have to wait for skiers before crossing under the rope.

In 1984 the Ridge Tow was finished and made for a platter from half way up the field to the ridge line. Run on a diesel tractor motor, it changed to a T bar in the 90’s, doubling capacity. All 3 rope rows were removed to make more space for skiable terrain.

The Main T bar was installed in 1978, also diesel. Changed over to electric mains power in 1996. The T bar received an electric VSD drive upgrade in 2023.

There is a hand grip rope tow on the learners area in front of the large sunny daylodge.

=== Mount Hutt (Methven) ===
Began in late 1970s with two rope tows

Historically

- The top T bars - 2 T bars installed side by side, above the top of the old quad. One T bar went halfway to the summit, the second T bar went most of the way to the summit, finishing slightly short of the current six-seater. These were diesel powered.
- The Quad - Formerly known as the Exhibition Quad which has been resited - it was formerly the main lift operating from the base buildings of the field, it was then resited to where the Nor'west Express now is and was replaced by the Nor'west Express in 2021.
- Two T bars from the base up to the top T bars - the track for these can still be seen to the right of the Summit Six.
- Two poma lifts from the base up to the right looking up, now serviced by the Nor-west Express.

Currently (2022):

- The Towers Triple chair with mid-station (one of only two left in operation in New Zealand). Fixed grip.
- The Summit Six seater, operating from the base buildings to near the summit of Mt Hutt at 2086 metres.
- The Nor'west Express Eight seater.
- 2x Learners conveyor belts

All of these are electrically powered.

=== Erewhon (Rangitata Valley) ===
All 4 rope tows (Learners, Access, Main & Senior) were removed when the skifield (and its club) closed in the late 1980s. The lodge is now used as the base of a cat-skiing operation.

=== Fox Peak (Fairlie) ===
Currently using 4 rope tows

- Skid row learners tow
- Meadow tow
- Shirt front tow
- Apex tow

All of these tows run off diesel engines.

There is a learners platter lift.

Historically there was a rope tow lower down to facilitate access from the lodge

=== Mount Dobson (Fairlie) ===
Historically:

- 1 rope tow
- 1 further rope tow up the peak to the south.
- 1 short platter to get back out of West Valley to the T-bar

Currently:

- 1 T-bar (installed in the early 1980s)
- 1 triple chair lift (originally at Perisher in Australia)
- 1 platter lift
- 1 learner rope tow

=== Round Hill (Tekapo) ===
Originally Tekapo ski area, before it closed in the mid-1990s

Historically:

- 1 double chair (which went to Rainbow skifield upon closing, and is now just over the valley at Ōhau)
- 1 or 2 poma lifts

Currently:

- 2 T bars
- 1 Poma
- Learners lifts
- The Heritage Express Rope Tow, a nutcracker rope tow which is the longest and (possibly) steepest rope tow in the world. 1.5 km long with 650 metre vertical rise. Installed in 2010.

=== Ōhau (Ōhau) ===
Historically:

- 1 rope tow
- 1 T-bar (installed in the 1980s)

Currently:

- 1 double chair, fixed grip, diesel
- 1 learners platter
- 1 Learners conveyor belts

Another double chair is in pieces, awaiting installation on an alignment above the current top station of the existing double.

=== Awakino (Kurow) ===
Currently running 3 rope tows - 2 nutcracker and one learners tow.

The first lift was installed in the 1950s, running on a Wisconsin engine/ tractor unit transferred from the old Danseys Pass tow. This engine is now sitting below the top towshed, as with most things at Awakino, the history is all around you.

The main tow direction was altered in the 1960s and then extended several times to its present location. It runs off a Ford 3000 tractor, installed within a railway container. The main tow is 800 metres long, rising from about 1450 metres to 1735 metres.

The top tow was installed in the late 1980s and currently runs on a petrol powered engine, the only such tow in New Zealand to still operate with petrol. The ridge tow is about 700 metres long, and rises from 1735 metres to about 1880 metres, close to the summit of the range at this point. This may be the steepest tow in the world.

The learners tow is small, currently petrol powered, and sits adjacent to the top huts. There are the remains of various other tows on the field, most notably the access tow below the top buildings that operated in the early 1990s before snow became unreliable and people obtained 4WDs, and an old learners tow just below the top buildings.

A tow was installed in the 1960s in the remote Hut Creek catchment behind the St Marys range. The old Case tractor drive unit for this sits forlornly in the snow just off the main ridge, but has not operated for over 50 years.

=== Treble Cone (Wānaka) ===
Historically:

- Main double (see below), installed in the early 1980s.
- Saddle T Bar (removed in 2006?). Replaced by the Saddle Quad.
- Saddle Double - diesel fixed grip, moved to Saddle Basin in 1995? after it was replaced on its old alignment by the current six-seater. Replaced in 2006? by the Summit Quad.
- Main T Bar (next to the six seater), removed in 1990s?

Currently:

- Six seater express (Doppelmayr) - detachable six seater, installed in 1996?
- Saddle Quad - fixed grip quad (Doppelmayr) from the old base site of the saddle basin double to near Tim's table, above the top of the old T-bar.
- Learners lifts

=== Cardrona (Wānaka) ===
Currently:

- Learners Carpet 17 vertical metres
- McDougall's Chondola 180 vertical metres
- Captain's Express 265 vertical metres
- Whitestar Express 320 vertical metres
- Valley View 300 vertical metres. This is being converted to a "chondola" arrangement, with several gondola cars being installed onto the main wire rope.
- Willows chairlift

Past:

1x double chair - the La Franchi double, more or less on the alignment of the current Whitestar Express.

Note: Calculated from Stats - official verification still needed

=== Coronet Peak (Queenstown) ===
Historically:

- A "double" rope tow (one which has two ropes working simultaneously but in opposite directions so that passengers can ride up on either side). Snowboarders would have loved this, if those things were invented back then. Installed in 1947 and designed by William (Bill) Hamilton, the inventor of the jet boat, who also perfected the nutcracker device that is still used today.
- The Happy Valley Poma - the original learners lift, running diagonally right from the base buildings towards the Lunch Rocks. From memory (1992) it had three large spans and two jumping off points. Removed in 1994
- The Shirtfront Double chair - installed in 1952 as one of the first chairlifts installed in New Zealand. This was the main lift of the field until 1994, whereupon it was then moved to replace the Happy Valley poma on a new alignment as the Meadows double chair. It lasted here until the start of 2010. Rumour has it that they didn't need to slow it down for suitability as a learners lift. Converted to electric at some stage in the 1960s.

It ran from the base buildings to the platform below the 'coronet' of the peak. A mid-station was sited just right of the bend in the M1 run, and was in use until it was removed. The mid-station was used for loading and unloading at the same time, with staggered queues and chairs left empty at the bottom.

The chairs on the lift could also carry sleds for the "cresta run" sled track at Coronet peak. This operated until the early 1990s.

- The Greengates triple. My favourite old lift. Installed in the 1970s on the western part of the field. This had real character, with the entire drive unit (first diesel, then electric) sitting on rollers within a frame mounted to a dynamic cable counterweight, presumably to take up the slack from the several large spans that the lift went through higher up. It had a mid-station a short distance up the line. Removed in 2007 and replaced with a six-seater Greengates express. The mid-station was rarely used, except when snow conditions on the lower runs (Lower Wall Street) prevented access back to the base.
- The Blue Gums poma, a small learners poma below the Rocky Gully T Bar. Removed in the 1990s.

Currently:

- The Coronet Express detachable quad - installed in 1994
- Greengates Express six seater - installed in 2005, on an alignment slightly to the west of the old Greengates triple.
- Meadows Quad - installed in 2010, replacing the old double.
- Rocky Gully T-bar, in Rocky gully on the right of the field, installed in 1981

=== The Remarkables (Queenstown) ===
All original lifts installed in the early 1980s when the field was developed.

Historically:

- The Alta Double (now replaced by a quad), sometime in the late 1990s

Currently:

- The Alta Quad - fixed grip, installed in the late 1990s.
- Curvey Basin Six - six-seat detachable express (Leitner-Poma) installed in 2014
- Sugar Bowl II - Detachable 6 seater express (Doppelmayr), installed in 2020, runs on a new alignment from the base area to a top station slightly to the north-west and above the original lifts top station. Replaced the Sugar Bowl Quad (fixed grip, installed in the 1980s, used to have a mid-station)
- Shadow Basin - Detachable 6 seater made by Doppelmayr in 2024. Replaced the old Shadow Basin lift (fixed grip 4 seater chairlift)
- Learners lifts

=== Other South Island lifts ===
- Danseys Pass

The original ski tow of the Waitaki Ski Club, installed shortly after World War II, and then moved to Awakino on the northern part of the St Marys Range. This tow motor now sits below the ridge tow at Awakino ski area

- Lees Valley

Remnants of old tows can be found on both Chest Peak and Mt Oxford in the Lees Valley area of North Canterbury.

- Kelly Range

This tow used to operate on the eastern slopes of the range up to Kelly Saddle until the late 1940s. Operated by the West Coast Alpine Club.

- Kakanui Mountains, above the Pigroot

Operated until the early 1990s, installed in the late 1970s, possibly using the drive gear from the old tow at Leaning Lodge in the Rock and Pillars.

- Rock and Pillars

A small tow on the summit plateau near big hut (running until the 1950s by the Otago Ski Club) A larger tow at Leaning Lodge, installed in the 1960s and operating until an avalanche in the early 1970s. Parts of this rope tow, including two towers, are still in place below Leaning Lodge Hut.

- Old Man Range

A rope tow and hut operated by the Vincent Ski Club and no longer on site and the club have since relocated to Coronet Peak.

- Garston

Installed by the Southland Ski Club and operated until the early 1950s when the club shifted to Coronet Peak.

- Mt Luxmore

Installed by the Te Anau Community on the slopes of Mt Luxmore in Fiordland National Park in the 1960s. The towers are still there, but little is known about the tow.
