= Flock Hill, New Zealand =

Coordinates: 43°7′48.58″S 171°46′20.37″E

Flock Hill station is located in New Zealand's South Island high country, in the Waimakariri River basin, 75 minutes drive from Christchurch on State Highway 73 which is now commonly known as The Great Alpine Highway between Castle Hill Station and Cass near Lake Pearson.

== History ==
Flock Hill Station was originally farmed as part of the original Craigiburn run. This was a huge expanse of land that extended from Broken River to Lake Pearson and from the Waimakariri River to the Craigieburn Range. It was in 1857 that Craigiburn was first taken by Joseph Hawdon who had come out from Australia where he made his fortune. When the West Coast Road was opened in 1865, Hawdon realized an opportunity and established a Hotel below the station at the bend in the road halfway down from Lake Pearson. There are no remains of the Hotel today.

Hawdon sold Craigieburn in 1867 to the Campbell brothers who went their separate ways by 1872, and the property was then managed by Reginald Foster of Avoca Station. Thomas Whillians Bruce from Cora Lynn had a hand in the run until 1881 when it was then taken over by Loan and Mercantile Company followed by Jones and Stronach and then sold again in 1906 to Frederik Savill. It wasn't until 1917 when the lease came up for review that the run was divided into three. James Milliken IV [1880-1947] took up two of the blocks and named the run "Flock Hill". Milliken derived the name from the scattered limestone rocks near Cave Stream which many believe to look like flocks of stone sheep. At the time of purchase James Milliken also owned the adjoining station "Castle Hill" but disposed of this in 1919 to Mr W. B. Clarkson so he could concentrate on developing his new holding.

Flock Hill Station is owned by the University of Canterbury and leased. Flock Hill Station is managed by Richard and Anna Hill and continues to be a working station stocking half-bred sheep and cattle.

== Geography ==
River boundaries contain this 14,000 hectares (35,000 acres) retreat at Broken River to the South and 16 km of upper Waimakariri River frontage in the East as well as 2 km of frontage bordering the scenic Lake Pearson. Flock Hill shares its only fenced northern boundary with Craigieburn station, while the western boundary is Craigieburn State Forest and a cluster of club skifields including Broken River, Craigieburn, Mount Cheeseman and Porter Heights. At its lowest point, the station is 500 metres above sea level, rising to 2000 metres at Mount Constitution.

This wilderness expanse includes seven alpine rivers and streams meandering for 66 km through the landscape. The TranzAlpine railway winds for over 25 km through the property up Broken River and along Slovens Stream.

== In popular culture ==
Flock Hill was the setting for the climactic final battle between Aslan's forces and the powerful army of the White Witch, led by the fierce minotaur, General Otmin, The Chronicles of Narnia: The Lion, the Witch and the Wardrobe(2005). The grass-scapes became the land called Narnia and the distant peaks of the Torlesse Range provided a dramatic backdrop for the White Witch's palace.

Flock Hill was the site for the Alpine Unity New Year's festivals in 2002 and 2003.
