= Porter River =

Coordinates: 43°13′S 171°45′E

Location
- Country: New Zealand

Physical characteristics
- Source
  - location: Craigieburn Range
- Mouth
  - location: Broken River
- Length: 19 km (12 mi)

The Porter River is a river of the Canterbury Region of New Zealand's South Island. It rises close to the southern end of the Craigieburn Range east of Lake Coleridge, flowing generally northeast to reach the Broken River close to Castle Hill. The Porters Ski Area is above the river valley's western flank, and State Highway 73 follows the river's course for some distance to the west of Porters Pass.

== See also ==
- List of rivers of New Zealand
