= Porter Heights =

Porter Heights may refer to:

- Porter Heights, New Zealand, ski resort near Christchurch
- Porter Heights, Texas, census-designated place (CDP)
