= Bill Hamilton (engineer) =

New Zealand engineer (1899–1978)

Sir William Hamilton OBE
- Born: Charles William Feilden Hamilton; 26 July 1899; Ashwick Station, Fairlie, New Zealand
- Died: 30 March 1978 (aged 78); Fairlie, New Zealand
- Other names: Bill Hamilton
- Education: Waihi Preparatory School; Christ's College
- Parent(s): William Feilden Hamilton; Cora Blakeney (née Cannon)

Sir Charles William Feilden Hamilton OBE (26 July 1899 – 30 March 1978) was a New Zealand engineer who developed the modern jetboat, and founded the water jet manufacturing company, CWF Hamilton Ltd.

Hamilton never claimed to have invented the jet boat. He once said "I do not claim to have invented marine jet propulsion. The honour belongs to a gentleman named Archimedes, who lived some years ago." What he did was refine the design enough to produce the first useful modern jet boat.

== Early life ==
Hamilton was born at Ashwick Station near Fairlie, New Zealand.

Hamilton survived an airplane accident returning to Rongotai Airport (Wellington) in poor conditions on 19 February 1936. The collision with the anemometer mast took the starboard wing off the fastest 'plane in the country, the Miles Falcon Six he was travelling in, and pilot Malcolm "Mac" McGregor died in hospital.

At the age of 21 he bought the 'Irishman Creek' sheep station in South Canterbury. After a trip to England became fascinated with motor cars and raced a Bentley. He decided to develop his own heavy machinery. He built a workshop, developed an excavator with an earth scoop and built a dam to supply water for a hydroelectric plant to supply power for domestic use and for his engineering projects, and started a manufacturing business.

== Ski tows ==
In 1947 tourism pioneer Harry Wigley of Mount Cook airline fame commissioned him to design and build the first tow for the Coronet Peak Ski Field near Queenstown New Zealand's first commercial skifield. In 1949 he completed a similar tow at Mount Ruapehu. Within a few years he had perfected the Hamilton Model B design that is still in use for nutcracker ski tows in New Zealand and Australia.

== Christchurch ==
The main manufacturing business, which had started in the workshop at Irishman Creek in 1939, moved to Christchurch in 1948. From there the company supplied heavy machinery, in particular to the Waitaki River hydroelectric projects.

== Jet boats ==
In the 1950s Hamilton set out to try to build a boat that could navigate the shallow fast flowing rivers where he lived. The rivers were too shallow for propeller driven boats to navigate as the propeller would hit the river bottom.

He investigated the American Hanley Hydro-Jet, a model which drew in water and fired it out through a steerable nozzle underneath the boat. Even when further adapted it did not work well. An employee suggested moving the nozzle to just above the waterline.

When he took one of his early demonstration jet boats to the United States, the media scoffed when he said he planned to take it up the Colorado River, but in 1960 three Hamilton jet boats, the Kiwi, Wee Red and Dock, became the first and only boats to travel up through the Grand Canyon. The boats also went down river through the Grand Canyon to cache petrol just prior to the uprun. The Grand Canyon trip planning, logistics for 2,500 gallons of fuel, and fuel placement was coordinated by famous Grand Canyon river runner Otis "Dock" Marston.

== CWF Hamilton & Co Ltd ==
The engineering company Hamilton founded, CWF Hamilton & Co Ltd, is now the holding company for two companies, Hamilton Jet and Hamilton Marine, that are focused on the production of waterjet propulsion systems. The company has divested itself of its other engineering activities.

== Honours and awards ==
In the 1961 New Year Honours, Hamilton was appointed an Officer of the Order of the British Empire, for services to engineering. In the 1974 Queen's Birthday Honours, he was appointed a Knight Bachelor, for services to manufacturing.

In 2004, Hamilton was posthumously inducted into the New Zealand Business Hall of Fame.

== Books ==
- "Wild Irishman", 1969, Lady Peggy Hamilton, (Publisher A.H. & A.W. Reed)
- "Hamilton Jet: The biography of an icon", 2014, John Walsh, ISBN 9780473289904 (Publisher: CWF Hamilton and Co)
