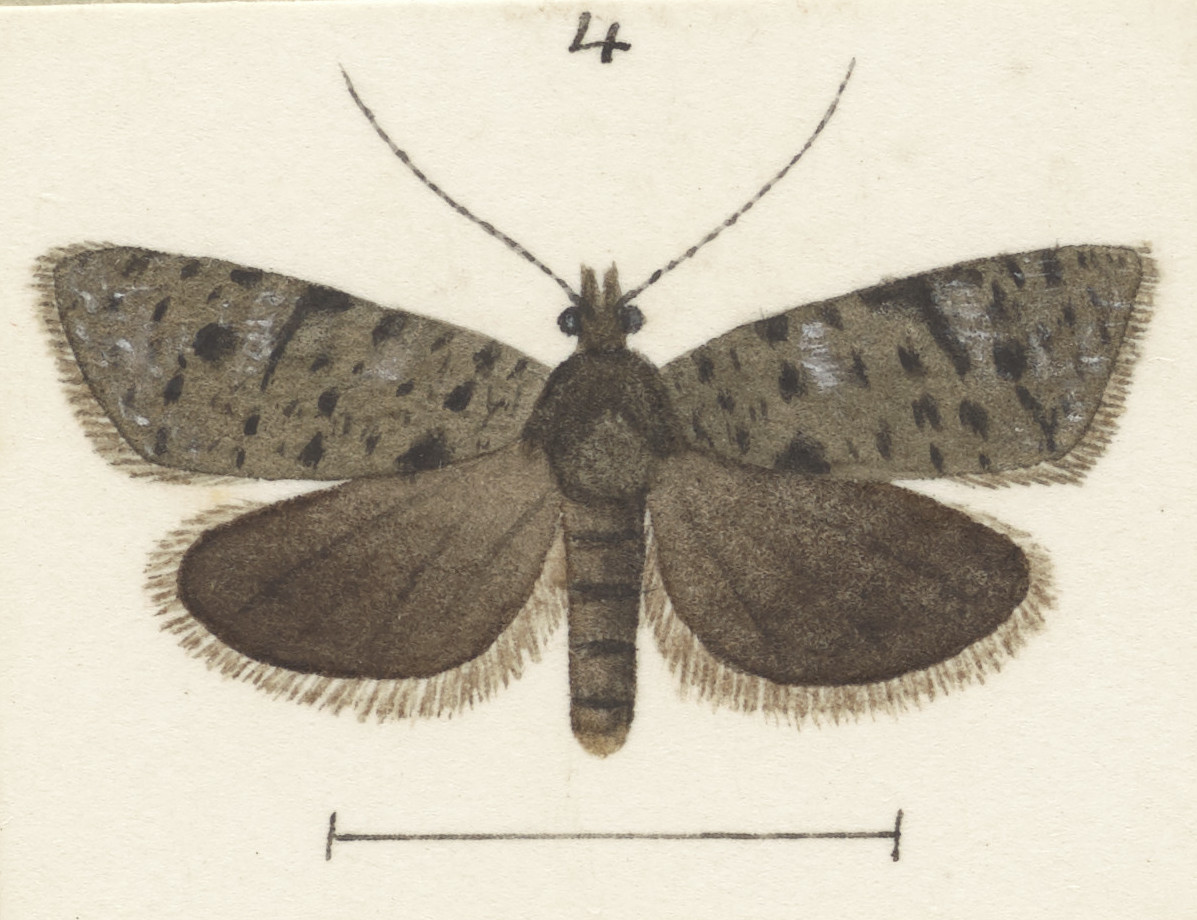

Scientific classification
- Domain: Eukaryota
- Kingdom: Animalia
- Phylum: Arthropoda
- Class: Insecta
- Order: Lepidoptera
- Family: Tortricidae
- Genus: Cnephasia
- Species: C. holorphna

Binomial name
- Cnephasia holorphna Meyrick, 1911

= Cnephasia holorphna =

Species of moth endemic to New Zealand

Cnephasia holorphna is a species of moth of the family Tortricidae. It was first described by Edward Meyrick in 1911 and is endemic to New Zealand. This species is found in the Craigieburn Range in the South Island. It inhabits alpine vegetation and adults are on the wing in January. It is regarded as being extremely local in distribution.

== Taxonomy ==
This species was first described by Edward Meyrick in 1911 using a specimen said by Meyrick to be collected by George Hudson on Mount Enys in the Craigieburn Range at 5600 ft. in January. Hudson discussed this species in his 1928 book The butterflies and moths of New Zealand where he stated that the holotype specimen had been collected in 1893 on Mount Olympus, also in the Craigieburn Range, near Castle Hill on the West Coast Road. The male holotype specimen is held at the Natural History Museum, London. The classification of this moth within the genus Cnephasia is regarded as unsatisfactory and in need of revision. As such this species is currently also known as Cnephasia (s.l.) holorphna.

== Description ==
Meyrick described this species as follows:

♂. 18 mm. Head fuscous mixed with whitish-ochreous. Paipi 2 ½, clothed with very long rough projecting scales, whitish-ochreous sprinkled with fuscous. Antennal ciliations bifasciculate, 2 ½. Thorax fuscous, sprinkled and edged with whitish-ochreous. Abdomen fuscous, segmental margins and anal tuft whitish-ochreous. Forewings suboblong, costa gently arched, with moderate fold extending from base to ¼, apex obtuse termen slightly rounded, somewhat oblique; fuscous, with irregularly scattered whitish scales, especially on margins, and with scattered strigulae of dark fuscous and blackish scales, but no defined markings: cilia fuscous, towards tips whitish. Hindwings fuscous, darker towards termen; cilia whitish-fuscous, with a fuscous subbasal line, towards tips whitish. Undersurface of hindwings grey.

== Distribution ==
This species is endemic to New Zealand. It is found in the Southern Alps in the South Island. Although Hudson stated it was comparatively common in the area he collected the holotype, he regarded the species as being extremely local in distribution. Hudson also stated in that 1928 publication that this species had not been collected since he collected the holotype in 1893.

== Habitat ==
This species was observed by Hudson flying over stunted alpine vegetation.

== Behaviour ==
Adults of this species are on the wing in January.
