= Craigieburn Range =

Mountain range in New Zealand

Coordinates: 43°12′S 171°38′E

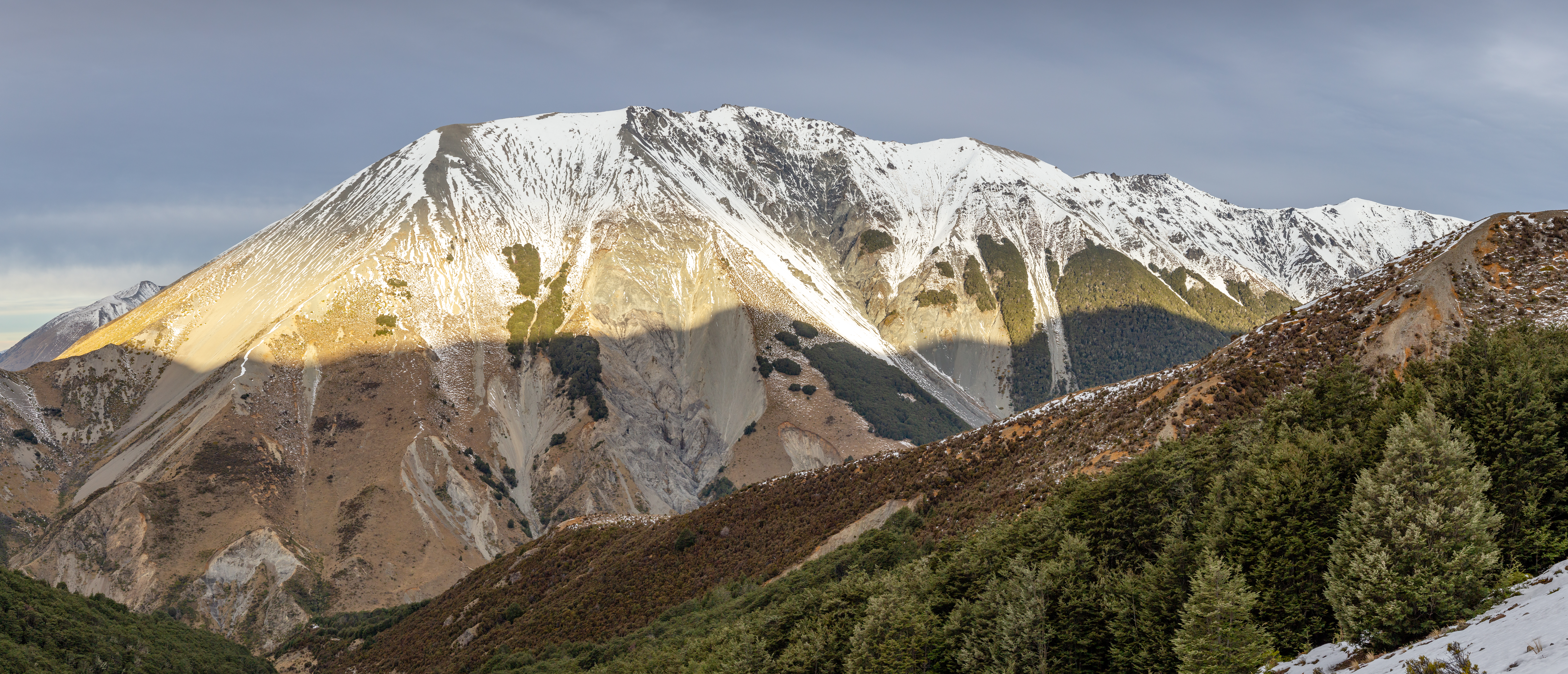
Baldy Hill from Snowslide Valley in Craigieburn Range

The Craigieburn Range forms part of the Southern Alps in New Zealand's South Island. The range is located on the south banks of the Waimakariri River, south of Arthur's Pass and west of State Highway 73. The Craigieburn locality is adjacent to the Craigieburn Forest Park.

== Named peaks ==
There are a number of named peaks located within the Craigieburn Range (north to south):

- Baldy Hill 1,834 metres (6,017 ft)
- Hamilton Peak 1,922 metres (6,306 ft)
- Nervous Knob 1,820 metres (5,970 ft)
- Mount Wall 1,874 metres (6,148 ft)
- Mount Cockayne 1,874 metres (6,148 ft)
- Mount Cheeseman 2,031 metres (6,663 ft)
- Mount Olympus 2,094 metres (6,870 ft)
- Mount Izard 2,019 metres (6,624 ft) Named after William Izard (1851–1940)
- Mount Cloudesley 2,107 metres (6,913 ft)
- Mount Enys 2,194 metres (7,198 ft)
- Carn Brea 2,090 metres (6,860 ft)
- Willis Peak 1,962 metres (6,437 ft) Named after Paul Hedley Willis (1941–2011)
- Blue Hill 1,946 metres (6,385 ft)

== Ski fields ==
The Craigieburn Valley Ski Area is located east of Hamilton Peak. The Broken River Ski Area is located east of Nervous Knob, and north of Mount Wall. A third ski field, Mount Cheeseman, is located east of Mount Cockayne and north of the mountain from which it took its name. Also Porters ski area at the south end of the range. All four ski fields are accessible from State Highway 73. A fifth ski field, Mount Olympus Ski Area, is accessible via Windwhistle.

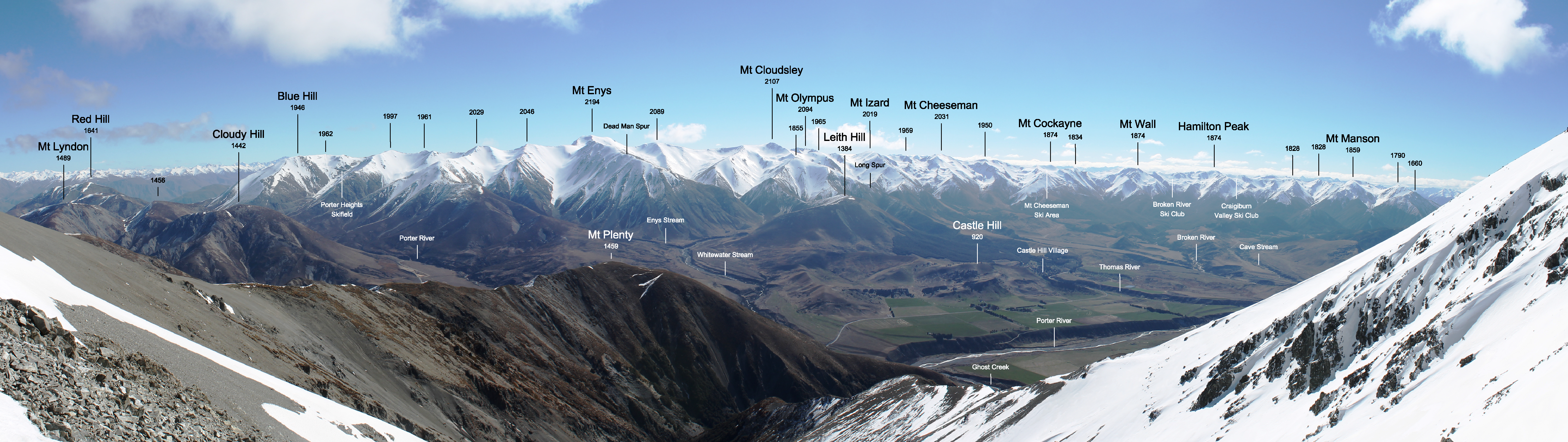
The Craigieburn Range as viewed from below Castle Hill Peak in the Torlesse Range
