= Craigieburn Forest Park =

Forest park in New Zealand

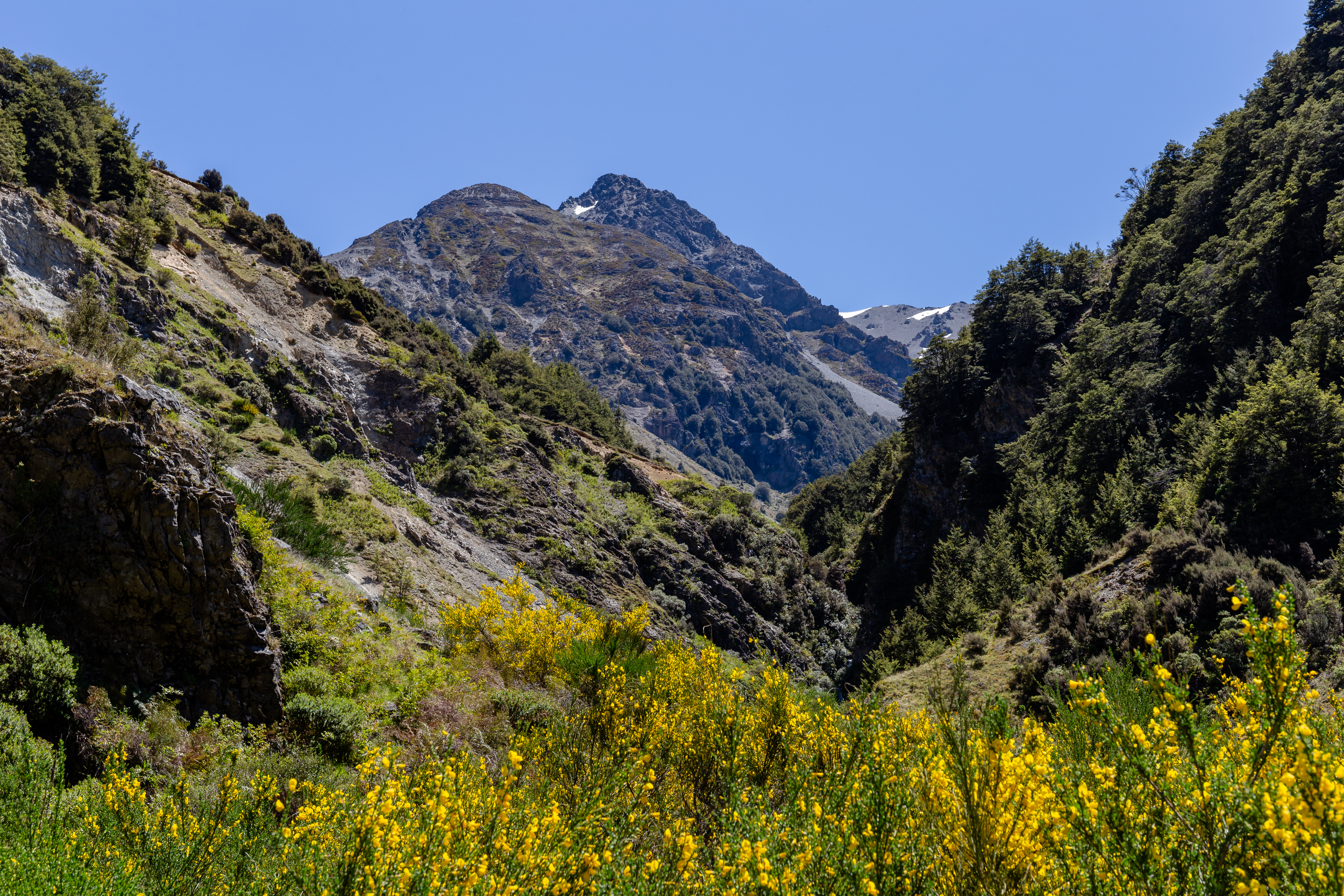
- View to Black Range from Cass River

- Location within New Zealand
- Location: South Island, New Zealand
- Nearest city: Greymouth
- Coordinates: 43.1527°S 171.7315°E
- Area: 44,694.78 hectares (110,443.2 acres)
- Governing body: Department of Conservation

Craigieburn Forest Park is a protected area in the South Island of New Zealand, adjacent to Arthur's Pass National Park to the north.

The park is administered by the Department of Conservation, and features the Broken River Ski Area and the Craigieburn Valley Ski Area. The park is popular for a range of recreational activities, particularly for people from Christchurch.

== Geography ==
The forest park covers 44,694.78 hectares (110,443.2 acres) of mostly mountainous landscape. One of its boundaries lies in part alongside State Highway 73 and is adjacent to the eastern flanks of the Southern Alps.

There is a range of vegetation, including mountain beech on lower areas. The bush provides a habitat for the tītīpounamu (rifleman), korimako (bellbird), miromiro (tomtit) and riroriro (grey warbler). During summer, pikirangi (native mistletoe) produce red flowers in the tree canopy.

On higher area, native tussock and other ground-covering plants dominate.

== History ==
=== 20th century ===
Craigieburn Forest Park was established in 1967. The New Zealand Forest Service used the area as an experimental forestry area, and planted wilding pines (pinus contorta) in the 1960s for erosion control.

=== 21st century ===
In the 2010s, the wilding pines were recognised as a fire risk. They were spreading quickly and threatening nearby native plantings, with seeds blowing up to 30 kilometres. By 2020, wilding pines were expected to cover 25% of New Zealand by 2035 to 2050 if action wasn't taken.

In 2020, the Department of Conservation began trying to eradicate wilding pines from the ground, including taking out conifer seedlings by hand. At Mount Bruce, chainsaws were used to cut down 30 hectares of mature Douglas Fir and helicopters were used to fly the wood out.

== Recreation ==
=== Craigieburn Valley Track ===
Craigieburn Valley Track begins beside the Craigieburn Valley ski field road, 1.5 km from State Highway 73, and passes through mountain beech forest until it reaches alpine tussocks near the ski field huts and car park.

From 1948 until the road was built in 1961 this was the only access to the Craigieburn Valley ski field. Materials for the early ski-field huts carried up this track.

The track is 4.5 km one way, taking 1–2 hours. A circuit, returning via the ski field road, takes 2–3 hours. There is a risk of avalanches.

=== Other walking tracks ===
- Nature Trail (20 min return), a short walk through a mountain beech forest.
- Bridge Hill Walk (10 min one way) a walk from the lookout carpark to a carpark with panoramic views.
- Hut Creek Walk (60 min return, 1.2 km), a walk from the between the Nature Trail and Bridge Hut Walk, following the trial planting area.
- Dracophyllum Flat Track (45 min one way, 1840 m), a walk to a picnic site covered by Dracophyllum, native tussock and small herbs.
- Lyndon Saddle (90 min one way, 2.3 km), a track from the picnic area, across Cave Stream, through grassy terrace and down through mountain beech forest to Lyndon Saddle.
- Lyndon Saddle to Helicopter Hill summit (30 min one way, 500 m), a track up a steep ridge with open screes between the mountain beech forest.
- Lyndon Saddle to Broken River ski field road (90 min one way, 2.7 km), a track down through low glacial terraces and then along Cave Stream.
- Lyndon Saddle to Craigieburn Valley Track (15 min one way, 625 m), a track up a Dracophyllum and tussock-covered face and down through beech forest to the Craigieburn Valley Track.

=== Cass-Lagoon Tramping Track ===
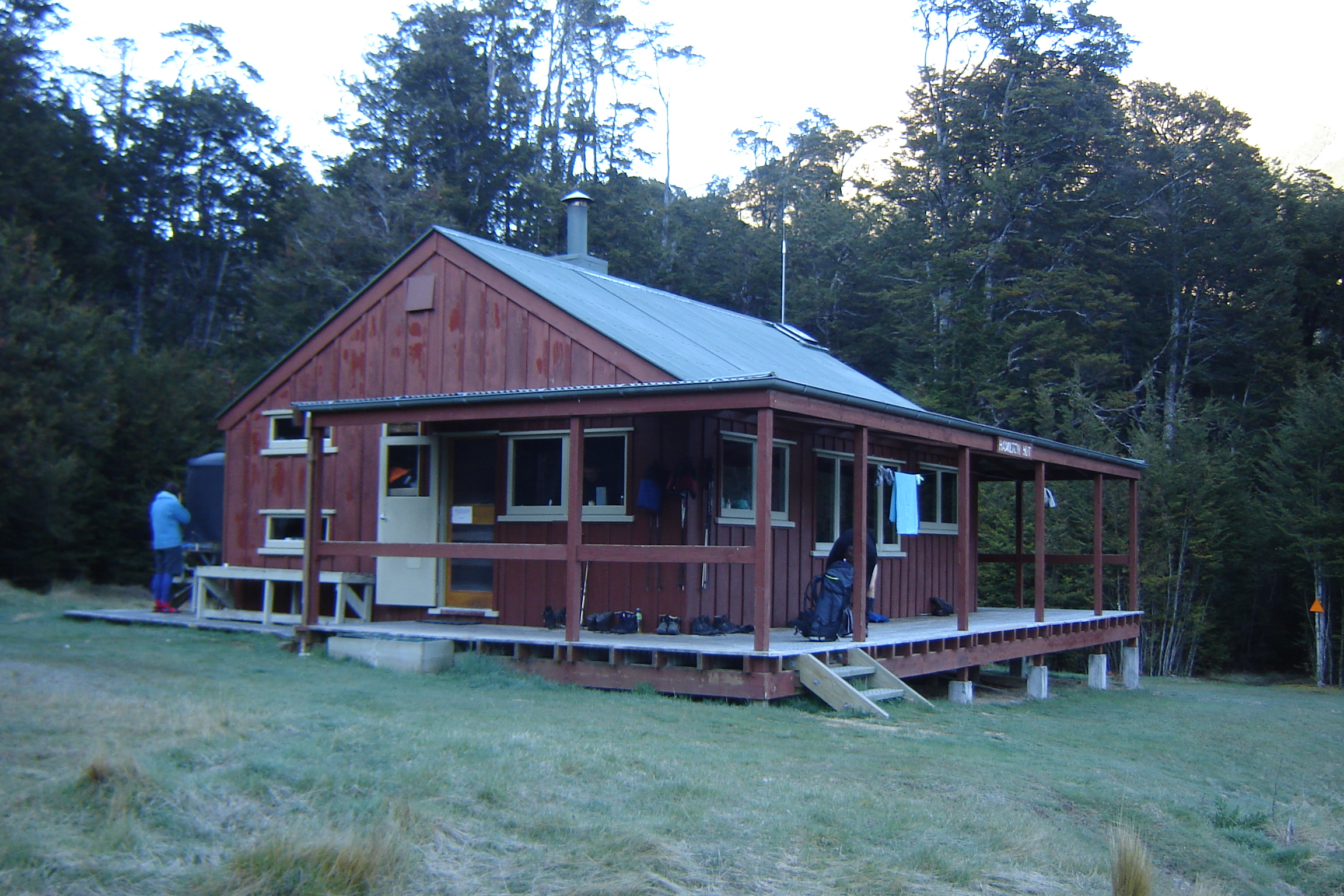
Hamilton Hut (at the midpoint of the Cass-Lagoon tramp)

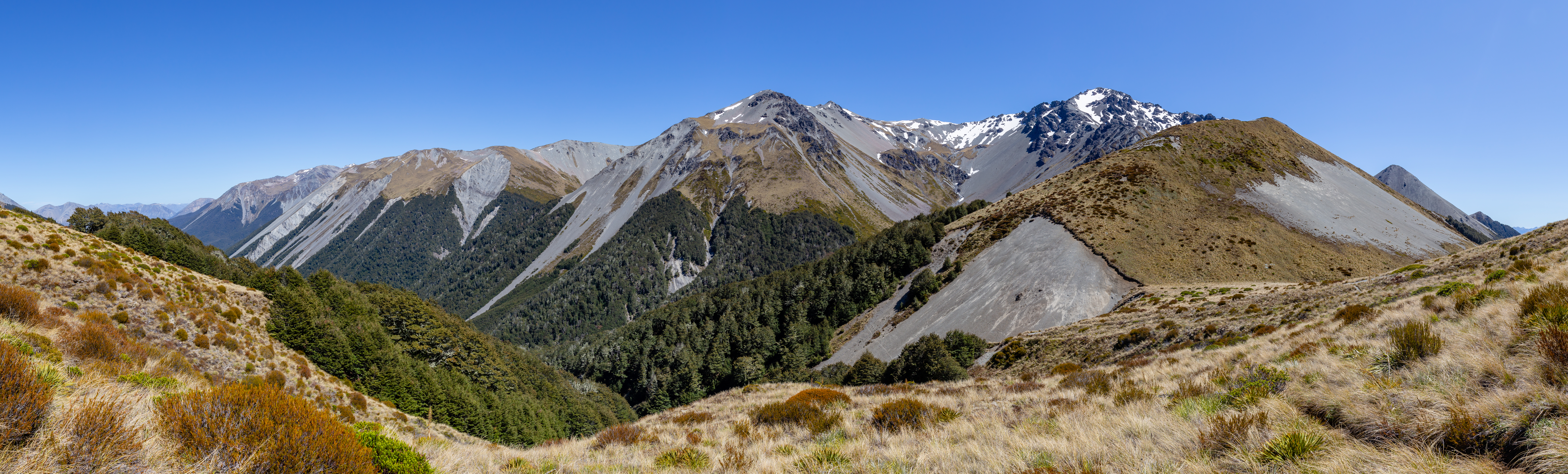
Panoramics of Cass Saddle in Craigieburn Forest Park

This tramp crosses the Cass saddle (1326 meters high) before descending to the comfortable 20 bunk Hamilton Hut. On the second day, after crossing over the Hamilton Creek (via a three-wire bridge) and the Harper river (via a swing bridge), the track meanders up the Harper river passing the Harper Hut before crossing the Lagoon saddle. Near the top of the saddle stands the Lagoon Saddle shelter, built in an A frame style. The track then descends Mount Bruce to the car park at Cora Lynn.

It is a very popular weekend trip as it is easily accessible from Christchurch. It is suitable for experienced trampers only. It is roughly 34 kilometers long and climbs and descends a total of 2100 meters.

=== Camp Saddle tramping tracks ===
The Camp Saddle tracks are mountain tracks, with the danger of extreme weather, avalanches and rockfall.

- Broken River Skifield Road to Camp Saddle (1-2 hr one way), the easiest way to Camp Sadde.
- Camp Saddle to Lyndon Saddle (1-2 hr one way), a track along the ridge and then down a scree slope to beech forest.
- Craigieburn Valley Track to Camp Saddle (2 hr one way), a track through beech forest and up a scree slope.

=== Ski field basin tramping tracks ===
There is walking access to the Broken River and Craigieburn ski field basins during summer months. The areas are harsh and alpine, and there are no marked routes above the bush-line. Fit trampers will be able to get to the main ridge and rocky peaks, while other walkers may prefer the lower bush.

- Broken River Skifield Basin huts (2-3 hr return), a walk following the zig-zag bush track or the main ski road.
- Broken River Skifield Basin ridge (4-5 hr return), a road to the tussock basin with further obvious routes up to the main ridge and onto Nervous Knob.
- Craigieburn Skifield Basin (5-6 hr return to the main ridge), an access road up the steep valley to the 1923 metre Hamilton Peak.
- Craigieburn Skifield Basin to Broken River ski field basin, a route traversing the ridge to Nervous Knob which is suitable for experienced trampers and climbers only.

== Climate ==
Climate data for Cragieburn Forest Park, elevation 914 m (2,999 ft), (1991–2020)
Month	Jan	Feb	Mar	Apr	May	Jun	Jul	Aug	Sep	Oct	Nov	Dec	Year
Mean daily maximum °C (°F)	20.9 (69.6)	21.1 (70.0)	18.6 (65.5)	14.5 (58.1)	11.2 (52.2)	7.9 (46.2)	7.6 (45.7)	9.0 (48.2)	11.7 (53.1)	14.1 (57.4)	16.4 (61.5)	18.9 (66.0)	14.3 (57.8)
Daily mean °C (°F)	14.0 (57.2)	14.0 (57.2)	11.9 (53.4)	8.6 (47.5)	6.0 (42.8)	3.2 (37.8)	2.8 (37.0)	3.8 (38.8)	5.9 (42.6)	7.8 (46.0)	9.8 (49.6)	12.2 (54.0)	8.3 (47.0)
Mean daily minimum °C (°F)	7.0 (44.6)	7.0 (44.6)	5.1 (41.2)	2.8 (37.0)	0.8 (33.4)	−1.5 (29.3)	−2.1 (28.2)	−1.3 (29.7)	0.1 (32.2)	1.5 (34.7)	3.1 (37.6)	5.6 (42.1)	2.3 (36.2)
Average rainfall mm (inches)	129.3 (5.09)	97.7 (3.85)	105.3 (4.15)	115.1 (4.53)	135.2 (5.32)	185.1 (7.29)	140.9 (5.55)	186.5 (7.34)	164.1 (6.46)	189.4 (7.46)	140.0 (5.51)	147.6 (5.81)	1,736.2 (68.36)
Source: NIWA

== See also ==
- Forest parks of New Zealand
