= Invincible Snowfields =

Ski resort in New Zealand

- Interactive map of Invincible Snowfields
- Nearest city: Glenorchy
- Coordinates: 44.7125°S 168.583°E
- Vertical: 300 m (980 ft)
- Base elevation: 1,650 m (5,410 ft)
- Trails: Backcountry
- Lift system: 1 rope tow
- Terrain parks: 0
- Snowmaking: No
- Night skiing: No
- Website: Official website

Invincible Snowfields is a private ski resort near Glenorchy in the South Island of New Zealand.

The area is about one hour's drive west of Queenstown and is close to Lake Wakatipu. Although it is a commercial operation, the field has few facilities and is run like an old fashioned club field, with its main drawcards being the backcountry terrain and feel, and it is targeted at advanced riders looking for natural chutes and gullies. There are no groomed trails. The field has a single 750m "nutcracker"-style rope tow, installed in 1996, powered by an old Ford tractor.

Access to the field is by helicopter from a site close to Glenorchy. The only accommodation available is a 10-person hut equipped with a wood fire and gas stove.

The field is part of Rees Valley Station, a 7290ha high country sheep station. Extensive snow cover on this property led to the development of both heli-skiing and the Invincible Snowfields operation.

Visitors to the field need to fend for themselves, carrying ski-touring equipment to ensure their own safety. This includes staying in a group and wearing an avalanche transceiver (beacon).
