= Mount Olympus Ski Area =

Ski field in Canterbury, New Zealand

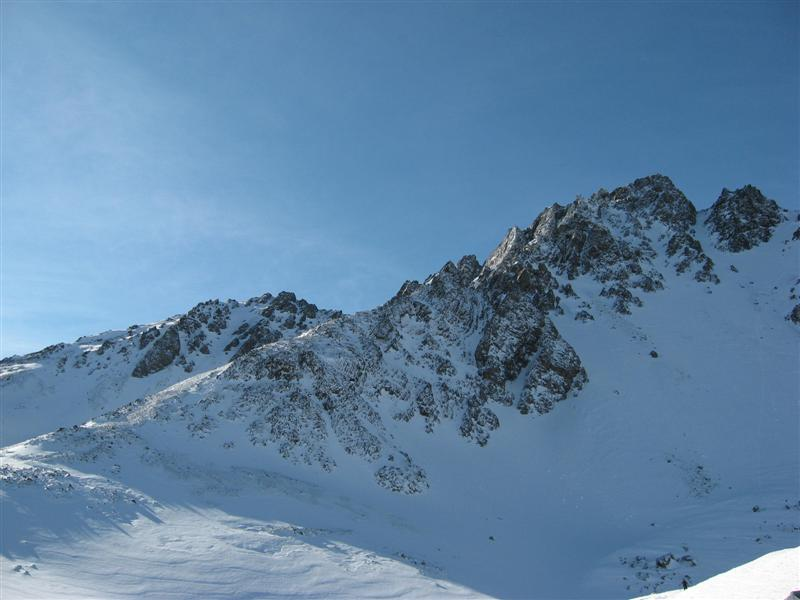
- Mt Olympus, on the LHS
- Interactive map of Mount Olympus Ski Area
- Location: Canterbury, New Zealand
- Nearest city: Windwhistle
- Coordinates: 43.192446°S 171.606344°E
- Top elevation: 1,875 m (6,152 ft)
- Base elevation: 1,425 m (4,675 ft)
- Trails: Backcountry
- Lift system: 3 Rope tow
- Terrain parks: 0
- Snowmaking: No
- Night skiing: No
- Website: http://www.mtolympus.co.nz/

Mount Olympus Ski Area, dubbed "playground of the gods", is a club skifield in Craigieburn Range, on New Zealand's South Island. Near the town of Windwhistle, and in the vicinity of other club fields such as Mount Cheeseman and Broken River, it is approximately 2 hours' drive from Christchurch. The skifield is run by the Windwhistle Ski Club. Ranging in elevation from 1430m to 1880m, the terrain distribution is 10% beginner, 55% intermediate and 35% advanced. There are four rope tows, and with a bit of walking, 60 hectares of terrain is available.

In 2020, Mount Olympus was unable to open due to COVID-19 and a lack of snow. This was the first ski season since 1978 that Mount Olympus was unable to open. In 2021, the access road was badly damaged by an early winter storm. It was estimated that it will cost $30,000 to repair the road in order to open for the 2021 season. Many donations were made and the road was able to be repaired in June 2021.

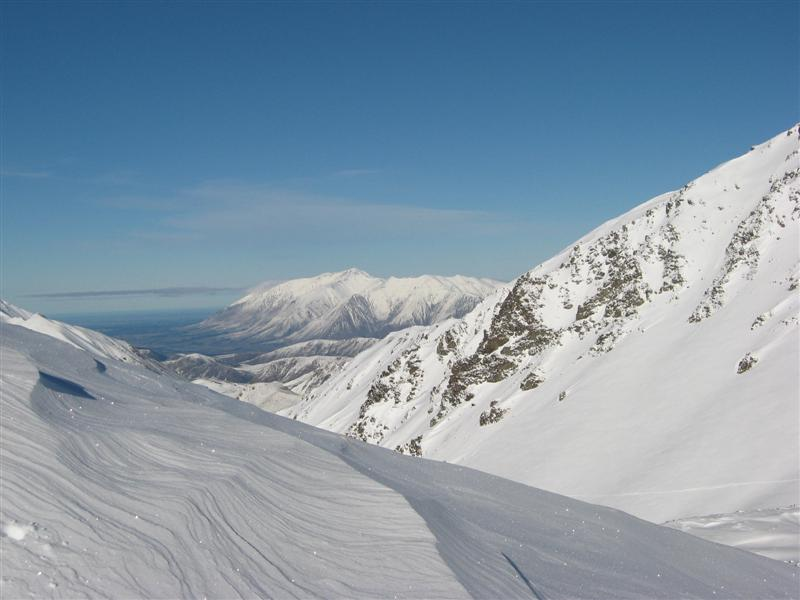
View to the SE, from the Ski Area

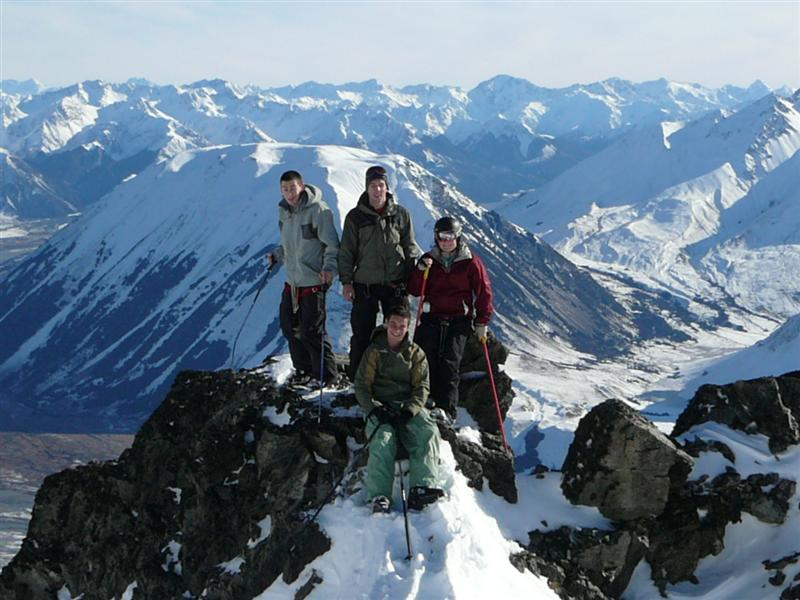
View from Ardys to the West, Aoraki Mt Cook in the middle Background.
