= Club skifield =

Type of ski resort in New Zealand

In New Zealand, a club skifield is a small ski resort run by a ski club to provide affordable skiing to its members. While members of the public can ski, members of the club receive heavily discounted rates, in exchange for a yearly membership fee and usually several days of voluntary work maintaining the resort.

== List of club skifields in New Zealand ==
North Island

- Manganui
- Tukino

South Island

- Awakino Ski Area
- Broken River
- Craigieburn Valley
- Fox Peak
- Hanmer Springs Ski Area
- Mount Cheeseman
- Mount Olympus
- Rainbow Ski Area
- Temple Basin

Former Club Fields

- Erewhon - The four rope tows were removed and it is now run as a backcountry area accessible only via helicopter. Now called Mount Potts.
- Mount Hutt - now run as a commercial operation by NZSki, along with Coronet Peak and The Remarkables
- Mount Robert closed in 2005, amalgamating with Rainbow Ski Area
- Porters Ski Area (previously "Porter Heights Ski Area") was formerly a club skifield, but is now run as a commercial operation. However, there is an active club associated that runs an alpine lodge.

== See also ==
- Skiing in New Zealand
