= Mount Robert =

Mountain in New Zealand

Pourangahau
- Mount Robert
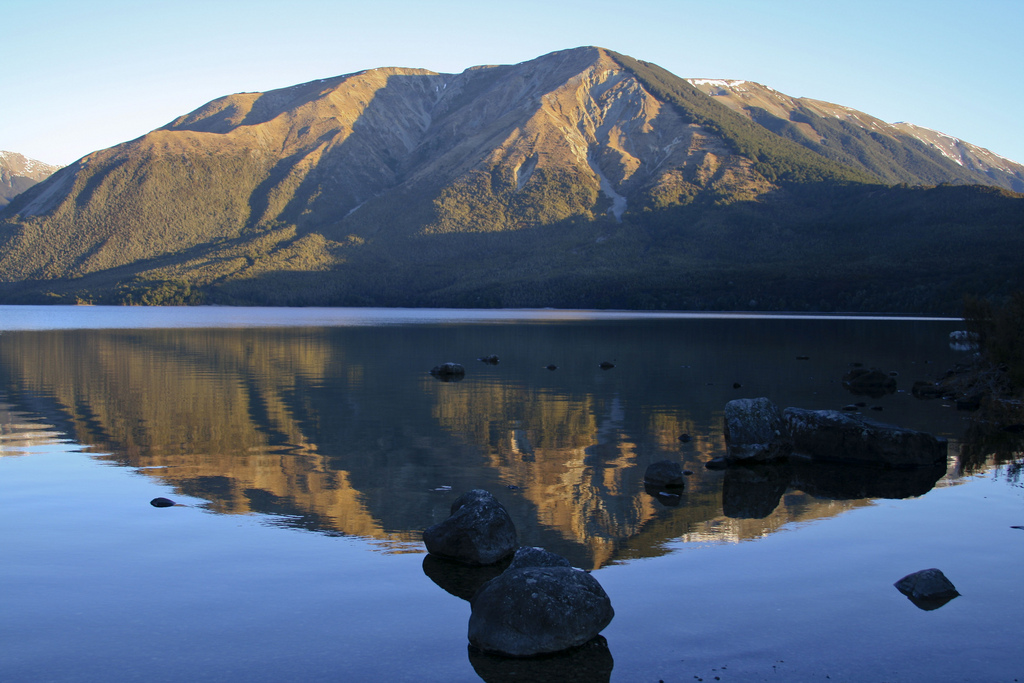
- Pourangahau / Mount Robert viewed from Saint Arnaud across Lake Rotoiti

Highest point
- Elevation: 1,421 m (4,662 ft)
- Coordinates: 41°50′0″S 172°48′40″E

Geography
- Location within New Zealand
- Location: Tasman District, New Zealand

Pourangahau / Mount Robert is a 1,421-metre (4,662 ft) mountain in the Tasman District of New Zealand's South Island. It is within the Nelson Lakes National Park. For many years, Mount Robert formed part of landowner and politician John Kerr of Nelson's Lake Station, but was returned to the crown in the years following his death in 1898. The partially unsealed Mt Robert Road, just west of the town of Saint Arnaud leads to a car park that is the start of tramping tracks into the Nelson Lakes National Park, and also a five-hour loop walk up the mountain: the Pinchgut Track zigzags steeply up to near the top of Mount Robert, then continues along a ridge to Bushline Hut, before descending via the more gentle Paddy's Track. The track offers view over Lake Rotoiti and Saint Arnaud.

The treeline on the northeastern slopes of Mount Robert is unusually low due to erosion following the loss of the original beech forest by fire in 1887 and subsequent grazing. Mature beech forest remains on the western and southern sides of the mountain.

On its northern side is an abandoned skifield. In 2005, the rope tows were removed and shifted to the nearby Rainbow Ski Area. A lack of snow was cited as one of the reasons for removing the tows. At times a helicopter shuttle was used for access to the skifield.

In August 2014, the official name for Mount Robert was altered to Pourangahau / Mount Robert, following the Ngāti Apa ki te Rā Tō Treaty of Waitangi settlement with the Crown.
