= Fox Peak =

New Zealand ski field

Coordinates: 43.838569°S 170.782839°E

Fox Peak is a small club skifield located 16 kilometres (9.9 mi) to the east of Lake Tekapo in New Zealand's South Island. Run by a non-profit organisation, the resort features four ski tows and a total vertical range of 580 metres (1,900 ft). While it is not the original Māori name it was previously called Rowley Peak, named after Thomas Rowley of the Canterbury Association, who was Dean-designate of ChristChurch Cathedral, but who never emigrated to New Zealand.

== See also ==
- List of ski areas and resorts in New Zealand
