= Hanmer Springs Ski Area =

Ski area in New Zealand

Coordinates: 42.4398°S 172.7352°E

Hanmer Springs Ski Area, located on Mount Saint Patrick, South Island, New Zealand is a club skifield 17 km (about 35 minutes' drive) from the town of Hanmer Springs. It has New Zealand's longest Poma lift at over 800m, a nutcracker rope tow and a new beginners fixed grip rope tow, giving access to trails rated as 10% beginner, 60% intermediate and 30% advanced. Elevation is 1769m at the top of the field with 52ha of ski terrain (310m vertical elevation).

The 1000 metre long Poma lift was installed in 1981. It was purchased second-hand from Whakapapa Ski Field and installed by volunteers. All the holes for the towers were dug by hand.

The facilities are run by the Amuri Ski Club Inc, a volunteer non-profit sports club for locals and visitors, with all proceeds from receipts being put back into upgrading facilities each year. The ski field was established in 1957. A groomer is used throughout the season which usually runs from the end of June until about mid September each year.

The Hanmer Springs Ski Area was the first ski field to open in early June 2021 after a big snowfall brought snow to the field.

== Services ==
Daily lessons are available and ski hire can be obtained from both the mountain and the village. A daily shuttle runs for those who are not confident on an alpine road, chains must be carried at all times and fitted when directed.
