= Tukino =

Ski resort on North Island, New Zealand

Coordinates: 39.277384°S 175.608337°E

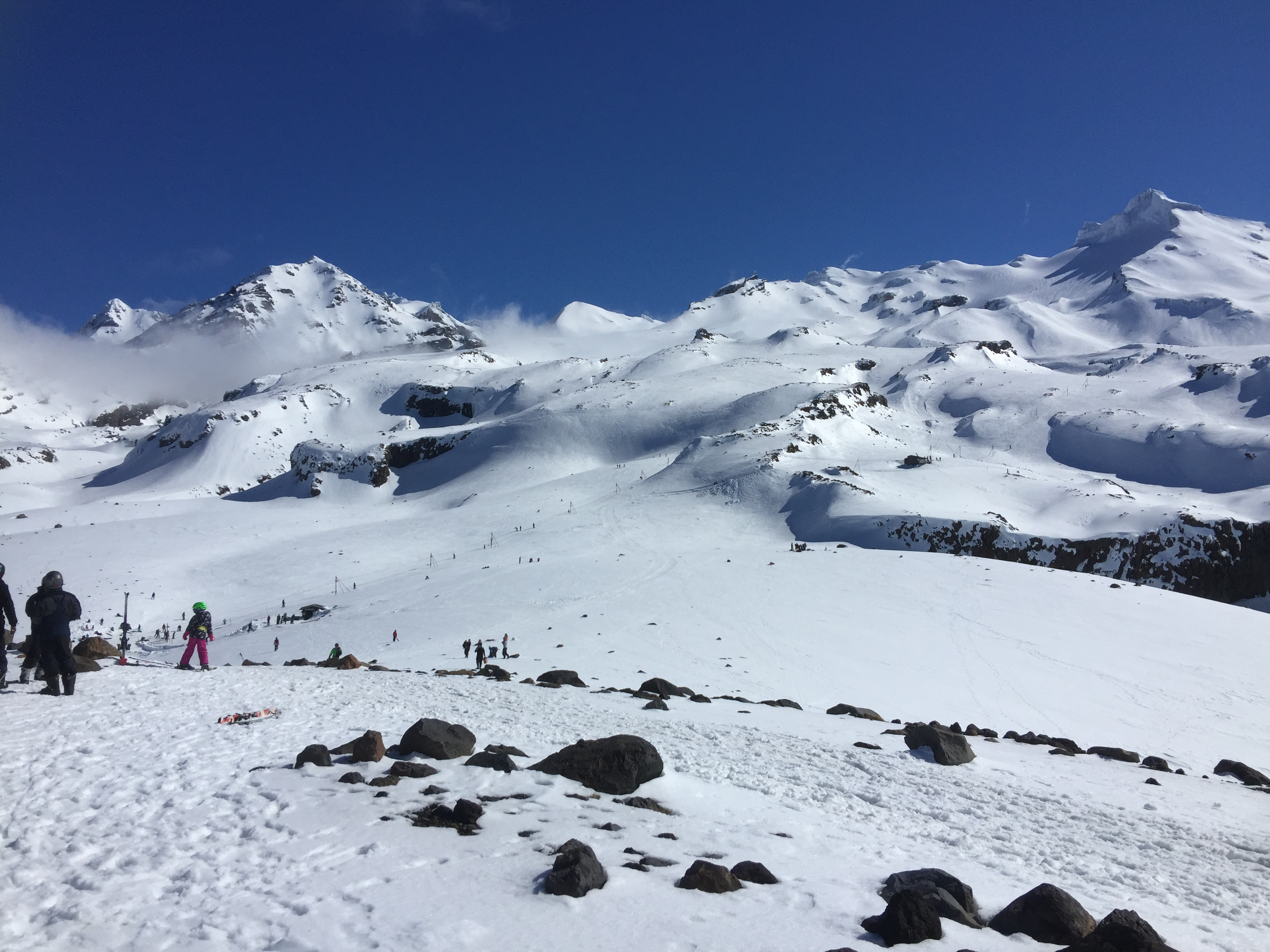
Tukino Skifield operating in winter

Tukino skifield is located on the eastern face of Mount Ruapehu, in the central area of the North Island, New Zealand.

A club managed field, Tukino is open to the general public and both skiing and snowboarding are popular.

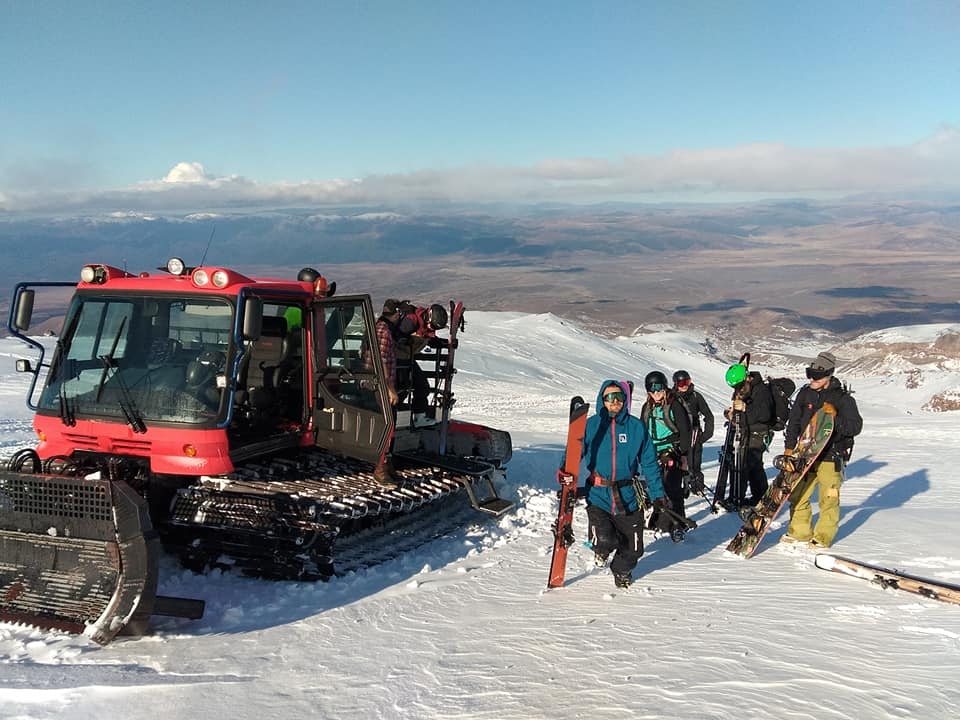
Skiers and snowboarders are dropped off at the Tukino Skifield upper boundary by the cat skiing service.

The ski field area is serviced by two permanent rope tows, a portable rope tow, and an over-snow vehicle providing 'cat skiing' where customers are driven to the upper reaches of the ski area, enabling them to ski or board the entire height of the field. The terrain includes a learner slope, intermediate and advanced technical terrain, and off piste areas.

Tukino is known for its untouched trails, uncrowded slopes, friendly atmosphere and good weather being on the lee side of the mountain. Day visitors will want to pack a lunch as there is no food service available.

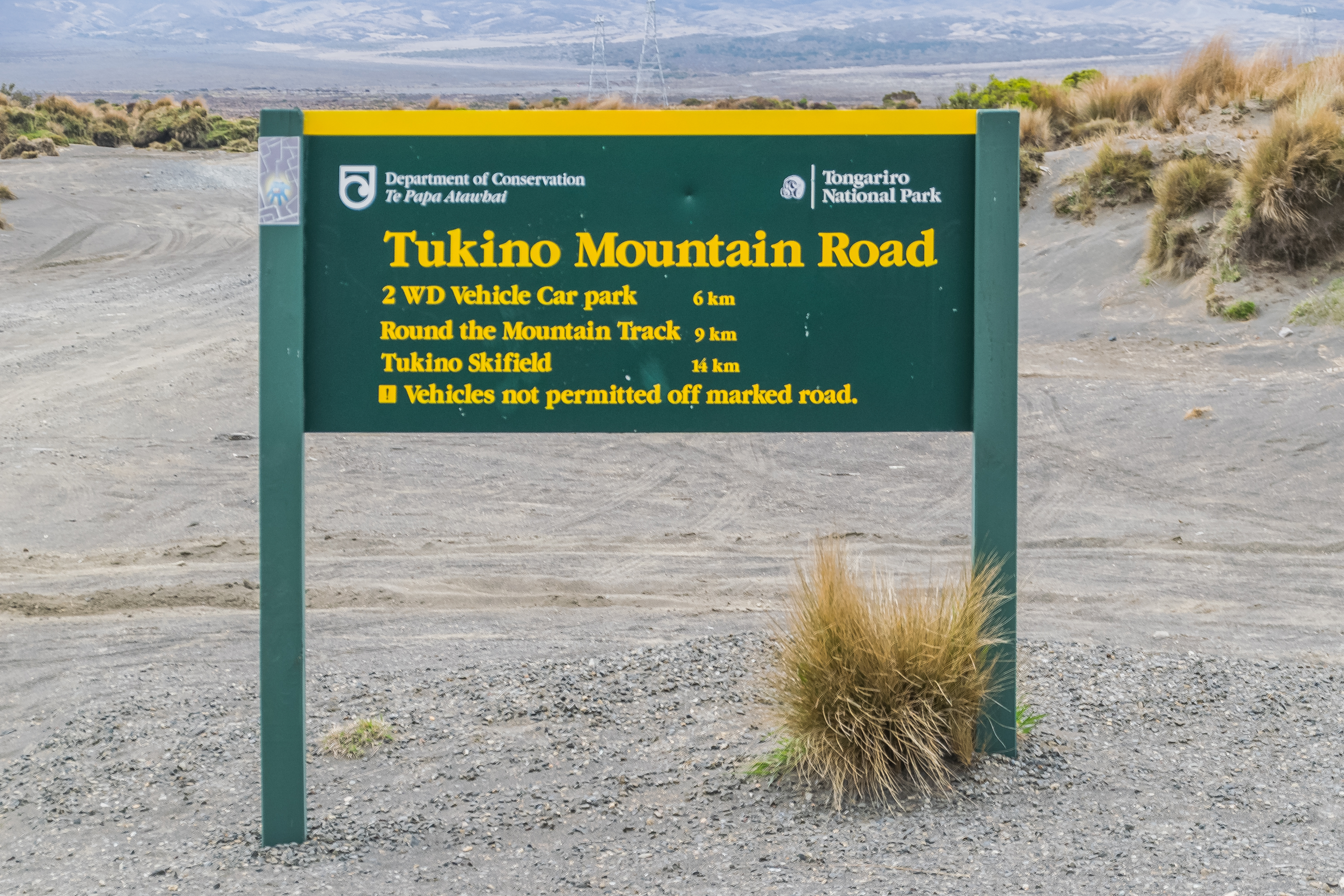
Sign near Desert Road turnoff

== Access ==
Access is via the Tukino access Road from the Desert Road, and is suitable for four wheel drive vehicles only during the winter months. There is a carpark for 2WD vehicles 6 km in from the Desert Road turnoff. Transport from the 2WD carpark can be arranged by contacting the skifield during the winter season. The road may be closed for safety reasons during the winter season, phone the ski field for up to date information.

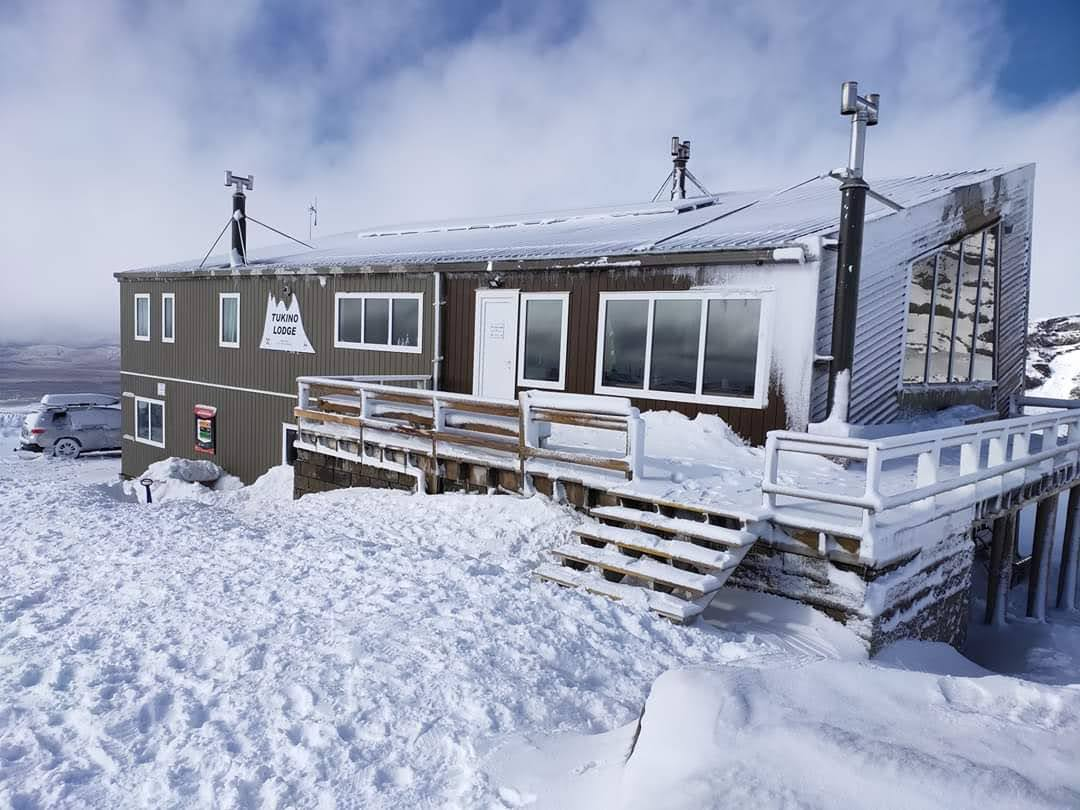
Tukino Lodge owned and operated by the Tukino Alpine Sports Club, one of three lodges at Tukino Skifield

== Accommodation at affiliated clubs ==
Accommodation is available at Tukino for those that want to stay and play. This is provided by the three clubs who have lodges at the top of the access road. Bookings are essential. There are three clubs which have lodges at Tukino Skifield:

- Tukino Alpine Sports Club
- Aorangi Ski Club
- Desert Alpine Club

Aorangi and Desert Alpine lodges operate in the winter season only, while the Tukino Alpine Sports Club lodge is available for accommodation year round.

== Rock and ice climbing at Tukino ==
There are over 200 established rockclimbing routes in the Tukino area, with scope for further development. The volcanic rock is generally sound and offers reasonable protection and tends to stay clean in the alpine environment.

The generally southeast aspect and multitude of climbs at low altitude make it a particularly good location for ice climbing on Ruapehu.
