= Manganui Ski Area =

Ski resort in New Zealand

Coordinates: 39.303694°S 174.091080°E

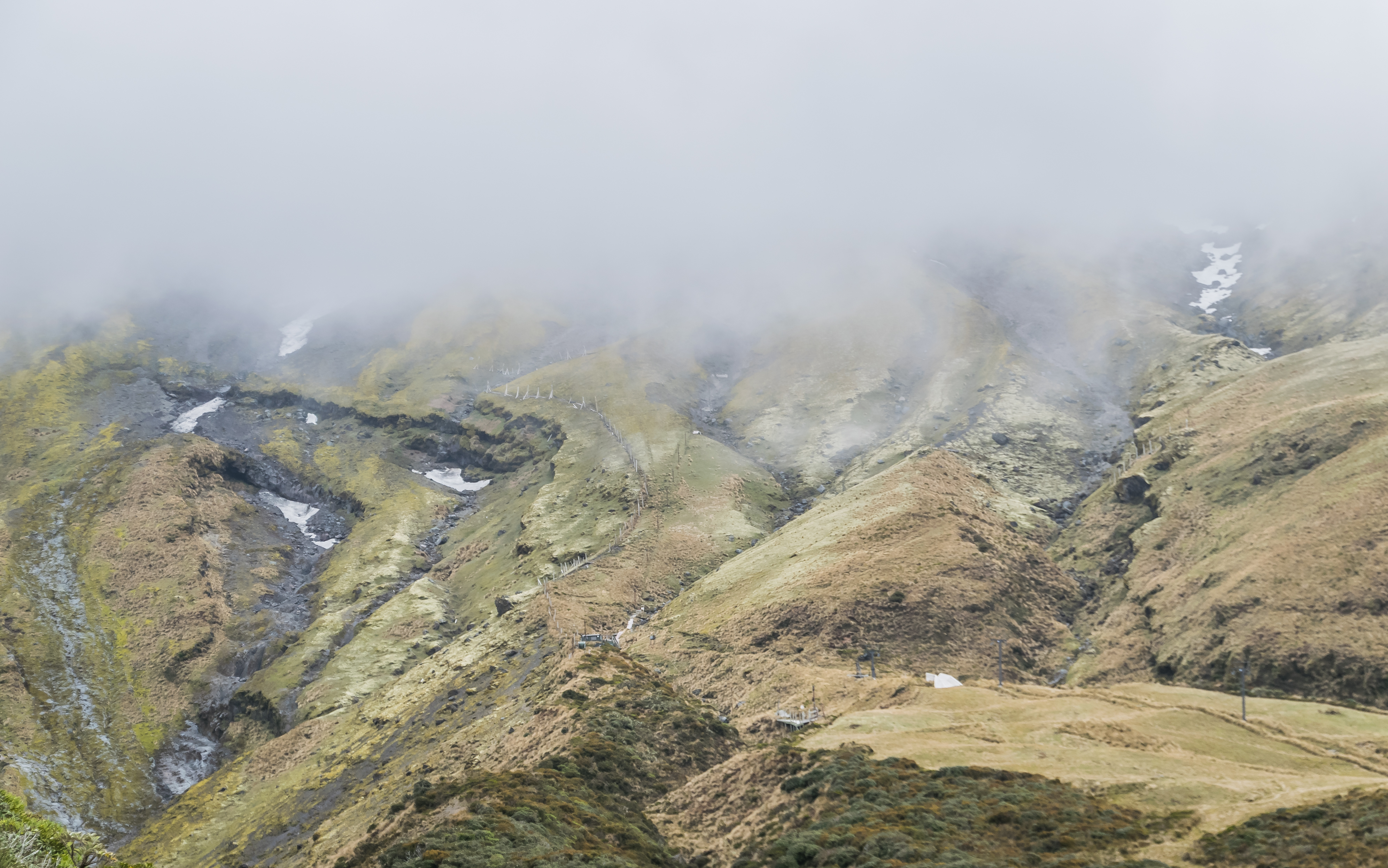
Manganui Ski Area in November

Manganui Ski Area, located in Taranaki, in New Zealand's North Island is a club skifield. Like all club fields, it has accommodation onsite, in the form of the 33-bed Manganui Lodge. It has 3 rope ski tows and a T-bar covering a beginner-intermediate terrain of 59 hectares. The elevation ranges from 1260 to 1680 m.

== Sources ==
- Club website
- https://web.archive.org/web/20110709163212/http://www.brownbearski.co.nz/manganui-ski-area/
- Trail map
