= Broken River (New Zealand) =

Coordinates: 43.1491°S 171.6992°E

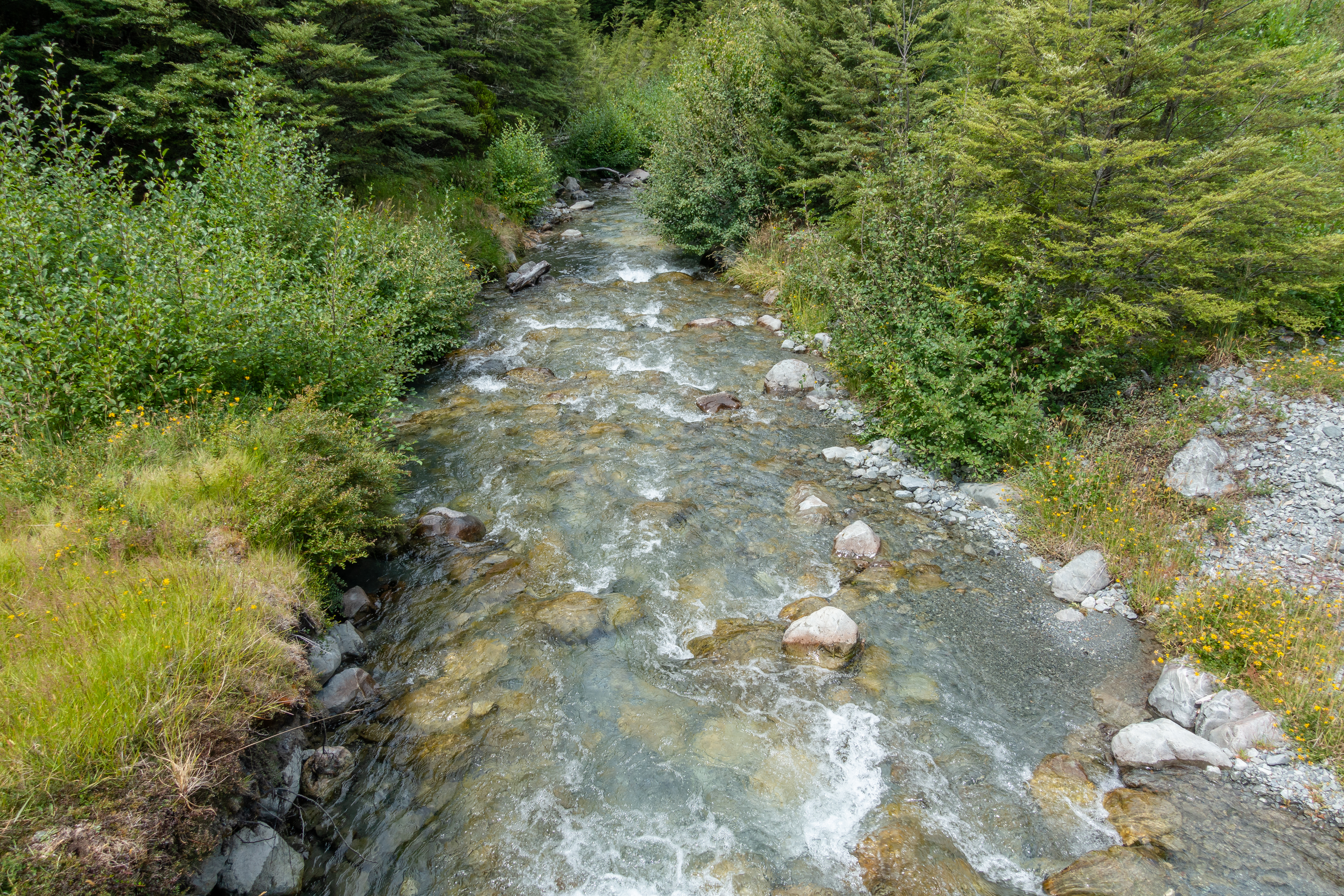

Location
- Country: New Zealand

Physical characteristics
- Source
  - location: Craigeburn Range
- Mouth
  - location: Waimakariri River

Broken River is a river in the South Island of New Zealand. It drains into the Waimakariri River due north of the town of Springfield.

The Broken River Ski Area is in the catchment area of the river. The Broken River Cave is on Cave Stream, a tributary of Broken River, and run for 594 meters in length.

Chamois, red deer, and pigs can be found near the river.

== See also ==
- Rivers in New Zealand
