= Rainbow Ski Area =

Ski resort in Marlborough, New Zealand

Coordinates: 41°52′32″S 172°51′39″E

Rainbow Ski Area is a ski resort in New Zealand's South Island. Located close to Saint Arnaud, the ski field is just across the regional boundary in Marlborough District.

It opens from late June to early October. The lifted area covers an elevation range of 1540 to 1768 metres, and it caters primarily for skiers of intermediate ability, citing a distribution of 25% beginner, 55% intermediate and 20% advanced level.

There is no accommodation on the field, but it is linked by shuttle to Saint Arnaud, 35 minutes away.

== Climate ==
The climate of Rainbow Ski Area falls under the Köppen-Geiger climate classification of ET (Tundra). The summers are cool, with an average February daily high of 14.5 °C (58.1 °F), even during this season overnight temperatures can go below freezing point. Winters are chilly, with the average low temperature in July reaching −6.2 °C (20.8 °F). Some days in winter are cold enough that they fail to reach 0 °C (32 °F). The annual average temperature in the Rainbow Ski Area is 4 °C (39.2 °F).

Climate data for Rainbow Ski Area, 1,540 m
Month	Jan	Feb	Mar	Apr	May	Jun	Jul	Aug	Sep	Oct	Nov	Dec	Year
Mean daily maximum °C (°F)	14.4 (57.9)	14.5 (58.1)	12.8 (55.0)	10.0 (50.0)	7 (45)	4.5 (40.1)	3.8 (38.8)	4.5 (40.1)	6.7 (44.1)	8.6 (47.5)	10.6 (51.1)	12.7 (54.9)	9.2 (48.6)
Daily mean °C (°F)	8.8 (47.8)	8.9 (48.0)	7.4 (45.3)	4.8 (40.6)	1.9 (35.4)	−0.5 (31.1)	−1.2 (29.8)	−0.4 (31.3)	1.7 (35.1)	3.5 (38.3)	5.3 (41.5)	7.3 (45.1)	4.0 (39.2)
Mean daily minimum °C (°F)	3.2 (37.8)	3.3 (37.9)	2.1 (35.8)	−0.4 (31.3)	−2.3 (27.9)	−5.4 (22.3)	−6.2 (20.8)	−5.2 (22.6)	−3.3 (26.1)	−1.5 (29.3)	0.1 (32.2)	2.0 (35.6)	−1.1 (30.0)
Average rainfall mm (inches)	131 (5.2)	94 (3.7)	113 (4.4)	131 (5.2)	139 (5.5)	125 (4.9)	127 (5.0)	120 (4.7)	142 (5.6)	159 (6.3)	148 (5.8)	143 (5.6)	1,572 (61.9)
Source: Climate-data.org, estimated from the Saint Arnaud weather station.
