= Porters Ski Area =

Ski field in Canterbury, New Zealand

Porters

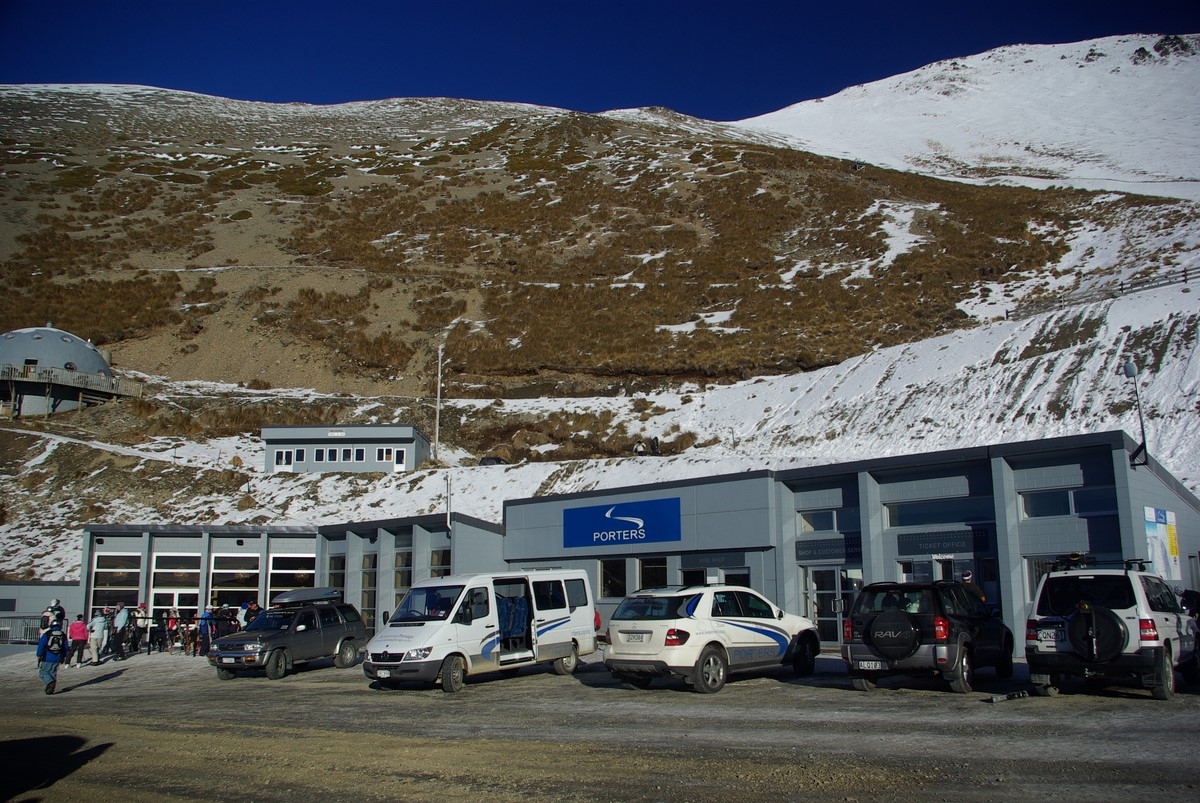
- Interactive map of Porters
- Location: Selwyn; Canterbury; New Zealand
- Nearest city: Springfield
- Coordinates: 43°16′26″S 171°38′34″E
- Vertical: 620 m (2,030 ft)
- Top elevation: 1,995 m (6,545 ft)
- Base elevation: 1,302 m (4,272 ft)
- Skiable area: 700 ha (1,700 acres)
- Trails: 29: 15% beginner; 35% intermediate; 50% advanced
- Longest run: 2 km (1.2 mi)
- Lift system: 6 lifts: 3 T-bar lifts, 1 Platter lift, 1 Magic carpet, 1 Chairlift
- Terrain parks: 1
- Snowmaking: Yes
- Night skiing: No
- Website: https://portersalpineresort.com/

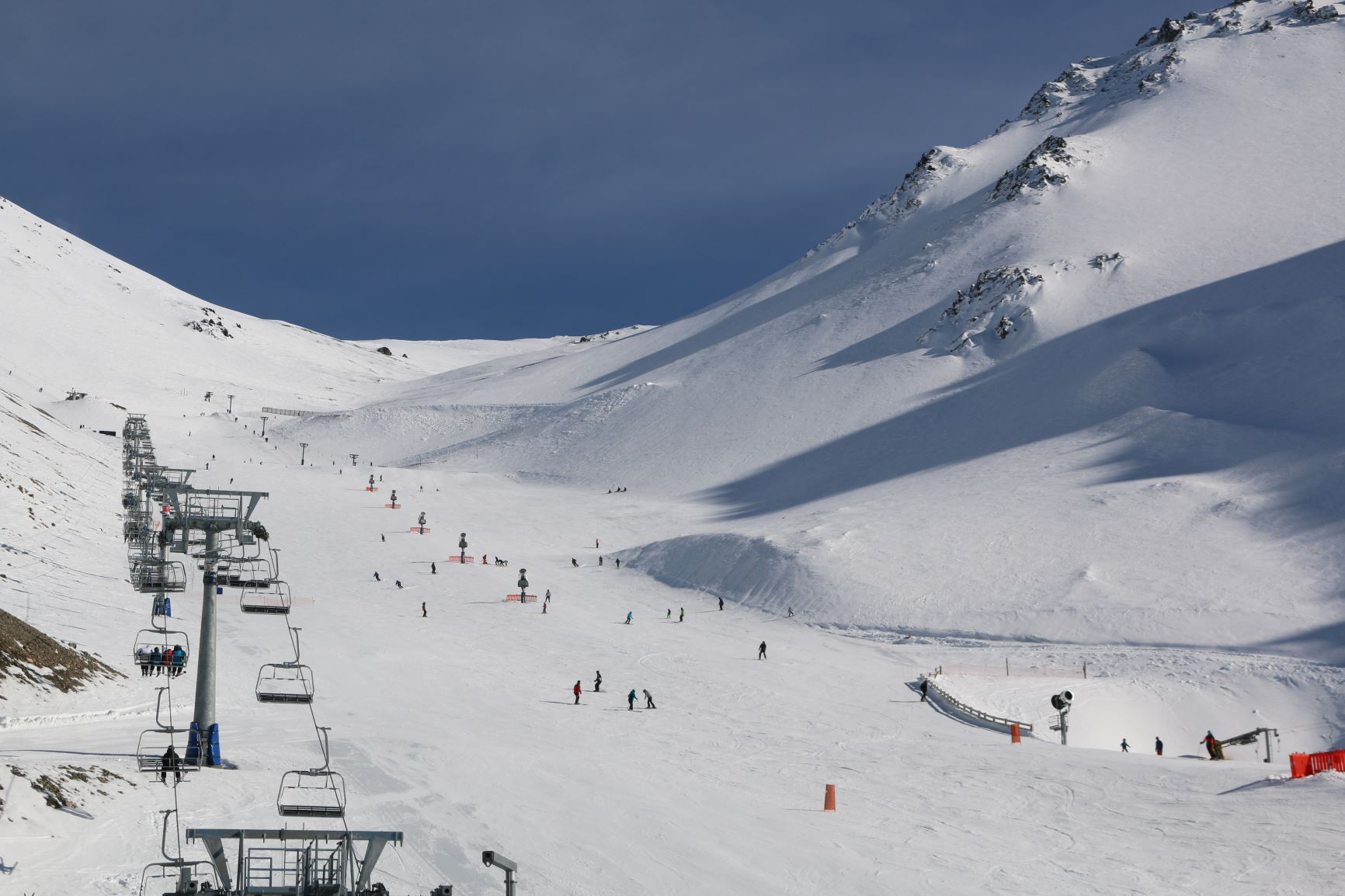
Porters Ski Field (2019)

Porters, is a commercial ski resort just over an hour's drive (98 km) west from Christchurch, in the South Island of New Zealand. Originally functioning as a club skifield, it has one beginner magic carpet, one platter tow, one chairlift and three T-bars. The difficulty of the slopes is distributed as 15% beginner, 35% intermediate and 50% advanced. Modern grooming equipment is used, and snowmaking facilities operate along the main pistes along the chairlift.

There is one club-run lodge with 42 beds, situated along on the mountain's access road, said by the company operating the field to be "the least intimidating in Canterbury".

With poor snow fall between 1987 and 1990, Porters became the first skifield in New Zealand to install snow making in 1991.

In 2007 the name of the field changed from Porter Heights to simply Porters to reflect a change in ownership. By 2020 it was again rebranded as Porters Alpine Resort. This has brought various improvements to the field, including a new groomer, cafe and platter lift.

In 2011 a proposed land swap attracted controversy. Blackfish, the Australian company that owns the ski field, offered to swap 70 ha of land on Banks Peninsula for 198 ha of conservation land adjacent to the ski field. Alan Morrison, the director general of the Department of Conservation, agreed to the land swap in principle. The land swap is opposed by the Canterbury Aoraki Conservation Board and by Forest and Bird.

Porters wish to expand into the adjoining Crystal Valley, which has better snow coverage.

In 2015 Porters had plans for a $60m gondola and $100m hotel complex. These have yet to be developed. Porters wishes to grow the operation to a year round business and has plans to install zip lines, hot pools, mountain biking trails and hiking. Currently, Porters has 2.3 km of purpose-built mountain bike flow trails. With a vertical climb of 120 metres.

On Friday 22 July 2021, Porters had one of its biggest days ever during the July school holidays with 1200 people skiers. This was bigger that the 2020 holiday maximum of 900 skiers and also greater than the 2020 July school holiday average of 501 daily skiers.

== Geography ==
Porters Ski Area is located at the southern end of the Craigieburn Range in the South Island of New Zealand. The Craigieburn Range is situated 85 km northwest of Christchurch and an equal distance from both the west and east coast of the South Island. The range is orientated northeast to southwest and extends for 26 km. The geology and topography of the Craigieburn Range is typical of much of the eroded alpine land east of the Main Divide with folded indurated sandstones and siltstones forming rounded ridge tops. Many of the slopes are still very active due to numerous shatter belts within the highly jointed bedrock resulting in the predominantly scree-covered terrain. Although valley glaciations would have been extensive in the Late Pleistocene, most evidence of this has been severely modified due to fluvial erosion and talus deposition. The ski area consists of approximately 80% of this scree with the remaining cover being alpine vegetation.

== Statistics ==
=== Elevation ===
- Summit 1995 m (6545 ft) 43°15′45″S 171°37′53″E
- Base 1302 m (4272 ft) 43°16′26″S 171°38′34″E

=== Lifts ===
- T-Bar 3
  - Doppelmayr
  - 1740 m - 1955 m (5709 ft - 6414 ft); 43°16′20″S 171°37′45″E
- T-Bar 2
  - Doppelmayr
  - 1580 m - 1780 m (5184 ft - 5840 ft); 43°16′15″S 171°37′59″E
- 1 T-Bar
  - 1305 m - 1625 m (4281 ft - 5331 ft); 43°16′23″S 171°38′34″E
- 1 Quad Chair (replaced T bar in 2015)
  - Doppelmayr
    - carrying capacity is 2000 people per hour (6:10 minutes)
- 1 Platter
  - 1305 m - 1340 m (4281 ft - 4396 ft); 43°16′21″S 171°38′38″E
- 1 Magic carpet
  - 43.272079°S 171.629146°E

=== Trails ===
Trail Name	Trail Rating	Incline	Length	Description
Beginner Area	Black Diamond		0.1 km	Beginner Area is founded just above the car park
Easy Street	Blue Square		1.1 km	Easy Street is founded just above the car park
Intermediate Area	Blue Square		0.2 km	Intermediate Area is founded just above the car park
Dome Face	Black Diamond		1.2 km	Dome Face is the large open slope above the old cafe and the ski patrol building
Big Mama	Black Diamond	31° - 37°	1.2 km	Big Mama is the large open slope on the true left of Dome Face, which runs down from the boundary ridge to the base area
Babylon	Black Diamond	31° - 36°	0.3 km	Babylon is small open slope that breaks off the main ridge about halfway down, directly above tower-5 of T-Bar 1
Ridge Route	Black Diamond	32° - 35°	0.8 km	Ridge Route is large open slope that is running down from the top main ridge
Julian's Bowl	Black Diamond	25° - 30°	0.5 km	Julian's Bowl the obvious Y-shaped bowl below the T-Bar 3 drive station. It is bound by T-Bar 2 lift track on the true left
Headwall	Black Diamond	18° - 37°	0.5 km	Headwall is large open slope on the true right side of T-Bar 3 lift line
Sundance Basin	Blue Square	20° - 30°	0.7 km	Sundance Basin is the groomed ski run for T-Bar 3, the slope on the true left of T-Bar 3 lift line
JC's	Black Diamond	29° - 39°	0.4 km	JC's is the slope from the main ski run on T-Bar 3 to about halfway the bowl
Leaper	Black Diamond	22° - 40°	0.9 km	Leaper is the slope from about halfway between the large rock buttress in JC's and to the small gullies above the top of T-Bar 2
Aorangi Chutes	Black Diamond	28° - 35°	0.6 km	Aorangi Chutes is the area where the slope is made up of multiple narrow gullies and rocky outcrops above T-Bar 1
Solitude	Black Diamond	21° - 35°	0.6 km	Solitude is the slope between the rocky outcrops of Aorangi Chutes and McNulty's Saddle
McNulty's Basin	Blue Square		2.0 km	McNulty's Basin is the groomed trail from top T-Bar 3 through McNulty's Basin
Serpent	Blue Square	21° - 29°	0.3 km	Serpent is the slope below the saddle and the first section of the ridge walk to Bluff Face
Jelly Roll	Black Diamond	30° - 33°	0.5 km	Jelly Roll is the slope midsection of the ridge walk to Bluff Face
Pot Belly	Black Diamond	29° - 35°	0.5 km	Pot Belly is located in McNulty's Basin below the Ridge Walk to Bluff Face, the prominent steep open slope below the summit of 'Allison Peak'
Uli's Roll	Blue Square		0.5 km	Uli's Roll is located in McNulty's Basin below the summit of 'Allison Peak'
Zodiac Traverse	Black Diamond		0.7 km	Zodiac Traverse is wider open section below the Allison Peak summit
Scorpio	Black Diamond		0.7 km	Scorpio is the large open slope in McNulty's Basin on the true right of the prominent rock buttresses, which border onto Libra and the upper part of Bluff Face
Libra	Black Diamond		0.7 km	Libra is the open slope between the two prominent, parallel rocky ridges, which run down between Scorpio and Bluff Face
Stellar Bowl	Black Diamond	30° - 40°	0.3 km	Stellar Bowl is the area below the triangular shaped group of rock buttresses on the true right of Libra
Stan's	Black Diamond		0.4 km	Stan's is the slope directly below the prominent, low buttress between Libra and Bluff Face
Pisces	Black Diamond	30° - 40°	0.3 km	Pisces is the slope directly below the lowest rock buttress on the small ridgeline that runs down from Bluff Face true left side
Bluff Face	Black Diamond	34° - 42°	1.2 km	Bluff Face is the large open face on the true left of the ski area with large prominent rock buttresses at the top.
Laurie's Face	Black Diamond	33° - 37°	0.5 km	Laurie's Face is the large open slope below the skyline ridge that sweeps down from the true left of Bluff Face
Don't Miss	Black Diamond		0.5 km	Don't Miss is the slope on the true left of the car park, which is made up of numerous rocks and rocky outcrops of moderate to large size and multiple gullies ranging from very narrow to middle width
Sphinx	Black Diamond		0.4 km	The Sphinx is located on the slopes above the snow groomer workshop and the access track

=== Climate ===
There are two principal storm systems that influence Porter Ski Area. The typical storm involves the passage of a southwest frontal band. Warm, gusty west to northwest winds precede the frontal passage with a change to cooler south to southwest winds following behind. The second storm type involves a deepening depression that moves across central New Zealand to lie off the East Coast of the South Island. Such a system feeds a moist east to southeast airflow into the Craigieburn region. Prowse and McGregor suggest that the majority of seasonal snow accumulations along the Craigieburn Range are associated with typical northwest-turning southerly storm cycles, due to the proximity of the range to the Southern Alps.

The coldest dry-bulb temperature ever recorded at Porters Ski Area was on 14 August 2011 at 23:35:48 at −15.37 °C (4.33 °F; 257.78 K).

Climate data for Porters Area Ski @ 1,320 m
Month	Jan	Feb	Mar	Apr	May	Jun	Jul	Aug	Sep	Oct	Nov	Dec	Year
Record high °C (°F)	26.6 (79.9)	26.0 (78.8)	24.7 (76.5)	19.3 (66.7)	15.9 (60.6)	13.5 (56.3)	14.2 (57.6)	15.8 (60.4)	16.0 (60.8)	18.4 (65.1)	23.4 (74.1)	23.8 (74.8)	26.6 (79.9)
Mean daily maximum °C (°F)	22 (72)	22 (72)	21 (70)	16 (61)	14 (57)	9 (48)	9 (48)	13 (55)	13 (55)	15 (59)	22 (72)	23 (73)	17 (62)
Daily mean °C (°F)	11 (52)	11 (52)	10 (50)	7 (45)	4 (39)	2 (36)	1 (34)	2 (36)	4 (39)	4 (39)	7 (45)	9 (48)	6 (43)
Mean daily minimum °C (°F)	0 (32)	−1 (30)	−1 (30)	−3 (27)	−5 (23)	−8 (18)	−7 (19)	−7 (19)	−6 (21)	−4 (25)	−3 (27)	−1 (30)	−4 (25)
Record low °C (°F)	−2.3 (27.9)	−0.8 (30.6)	−4.4 (24.1)	−5.3 (22.5)	−7.2 (19.0)	−8.3 (17.1)	−10.9 (12.4)	−11.4 (11.5)	−8.0 (17.6)	−7.6 (18.3)	−5.9 (21.4)	−4.2 (24.4)	−11.4 (11.5)
Average precipitation mm (inches)	62 (2.4)	94 (3.7)	40 (1.6)	82 (3.2)	131 (5.2)	157 (6.2)	132 (5.2)	149 (5.9)	104 (4.1)	125 (4.9)	61 (2.4)	92 (3.6)	1,229 (48.4)
Average precipitation days	13	12	11	11	12	17	16	18	18	16	11	15	170
Average relative humidity (%)	67	69	68	70	69	66	66	70	66	66	67	72	68
Source: Data from an automatic weather station between 2005 and October 2015

== Flora ==
187 plant species can be found within the ski field boundary.

Porters Ski Area (2023)

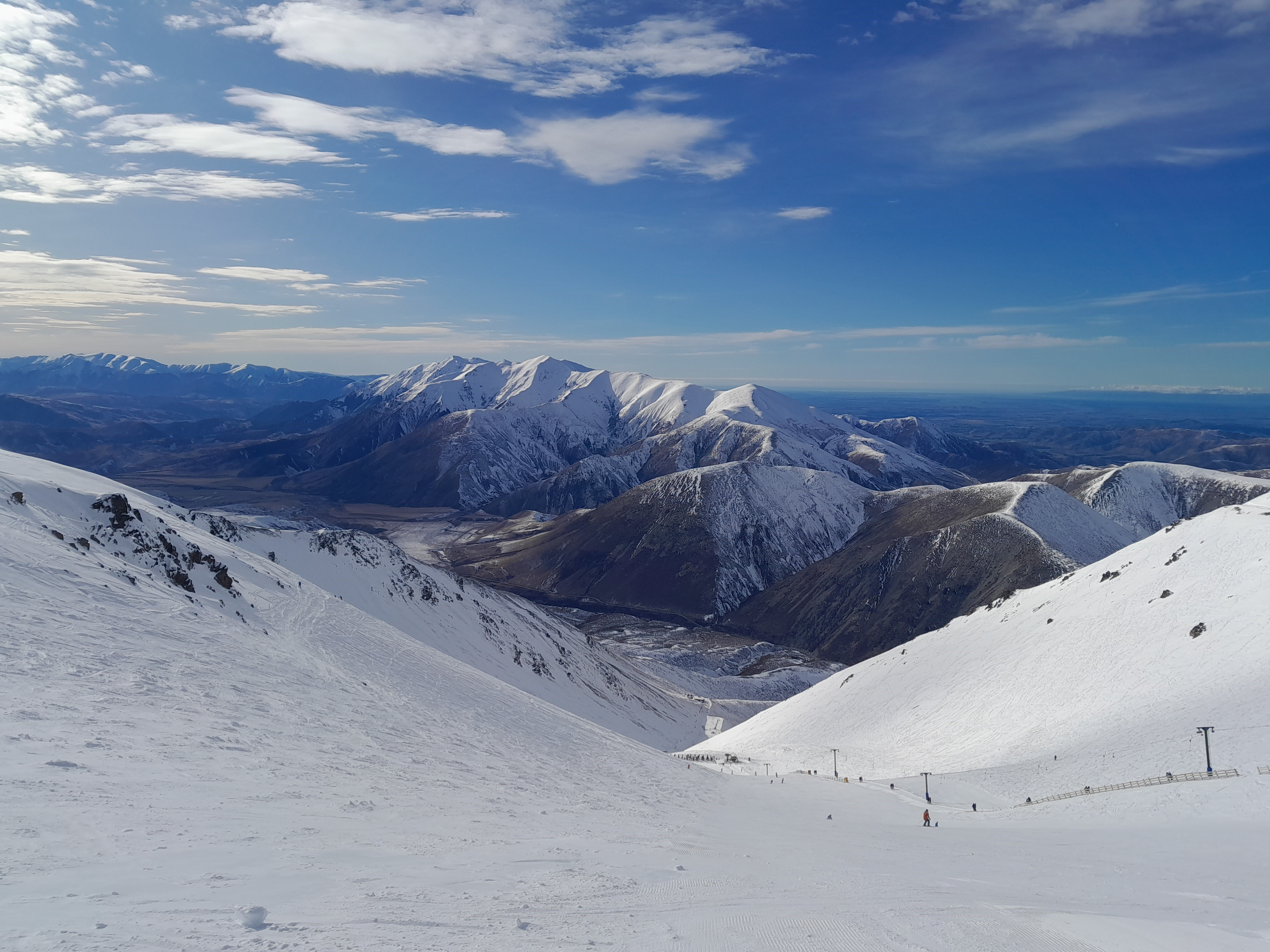
Sundance Valley (2023)

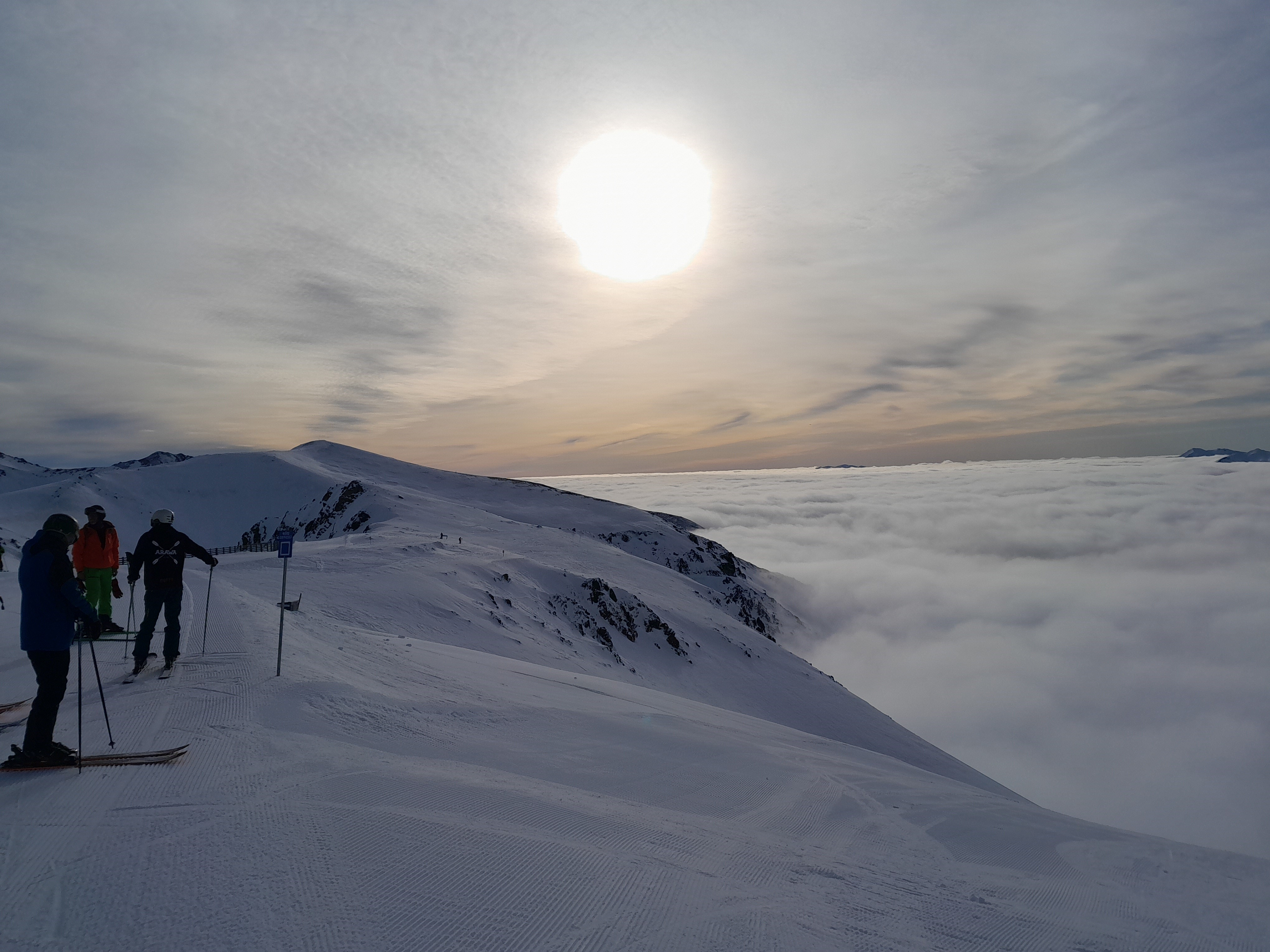
View from the top of the ski field above the clouds (2023)

== Fauna ==
During the summer months five species of grasshoppers can be found within the ski field boundary. They include Sigaus villosus which can be found along the ridgelines, Brachaspis nivalis which lives on the rocky scree, Sigaus australis, Paprides nitidus which both live in the alpine tussocklands and Phaulacridium marginale which can be found in the tussocklands below 1,100 m.
