= Mount Cheeseman =

Ski field in Canterbury, New Zealand

Coordinates: 43.157188°S 171.668996°E

- Interactive map of Mount Cheeseman
- Nearest city: Christchurch, New Zealand
- Top elevation: 1,840 m (6,040 ft)
- Base elevation: 1,570 m (5,150 ft)

Mount Cheeseman is a club snowfield in New Zealand's South Island, near the town of Springfield, about an hour and a half (111 km) from Christchurch.

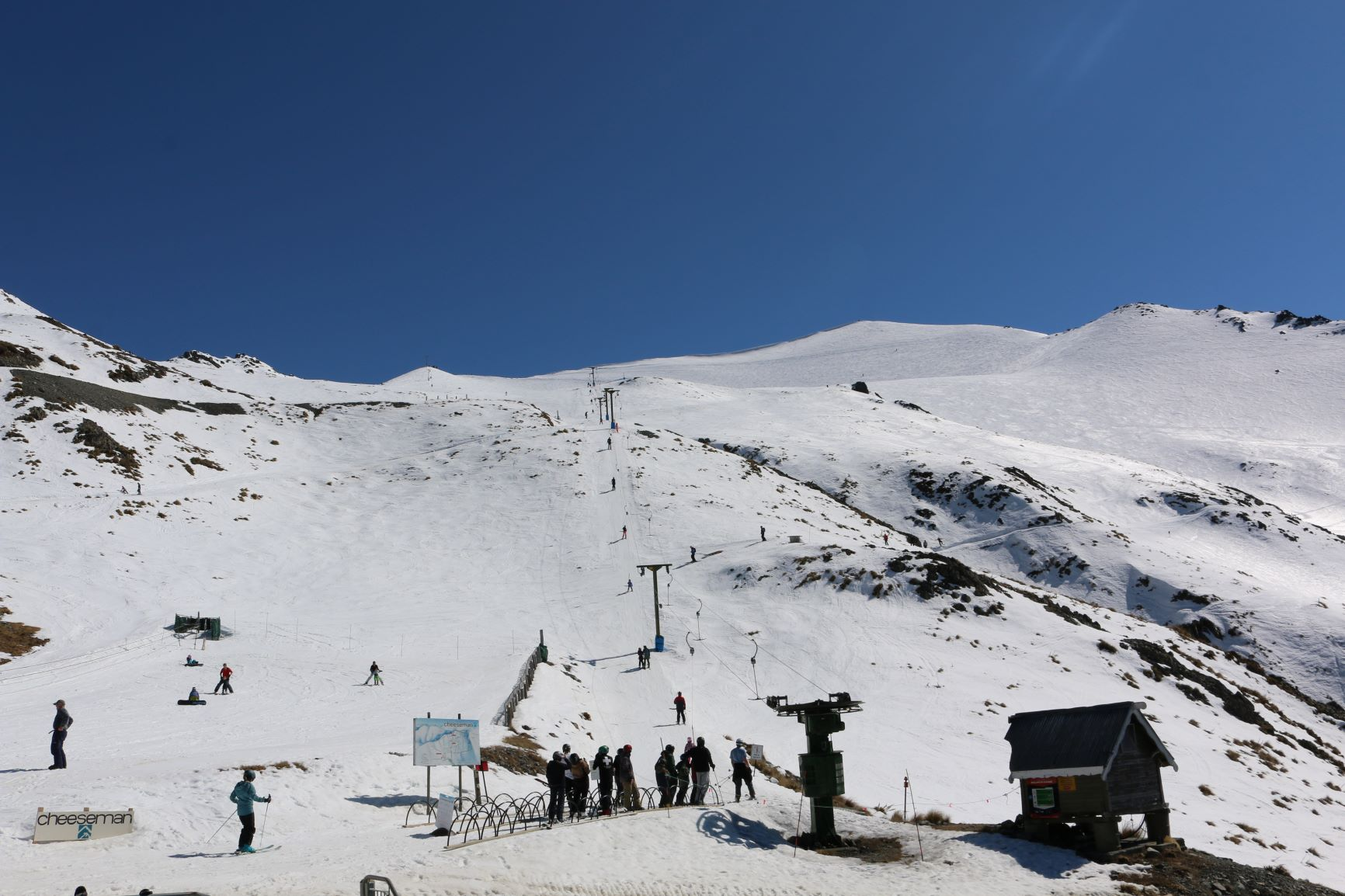
Mount Cheeseman Ski Field (2019) View of the first T bar

Situated in a south-east-facing basin, it features two T-bar lifts and one learner tow. The runs cover an elevation range of 1570–1840 metres, with a distribution of 15% beginner slopes, 50% intermediate, and 35% advanced. Some of the slopes are groomed.

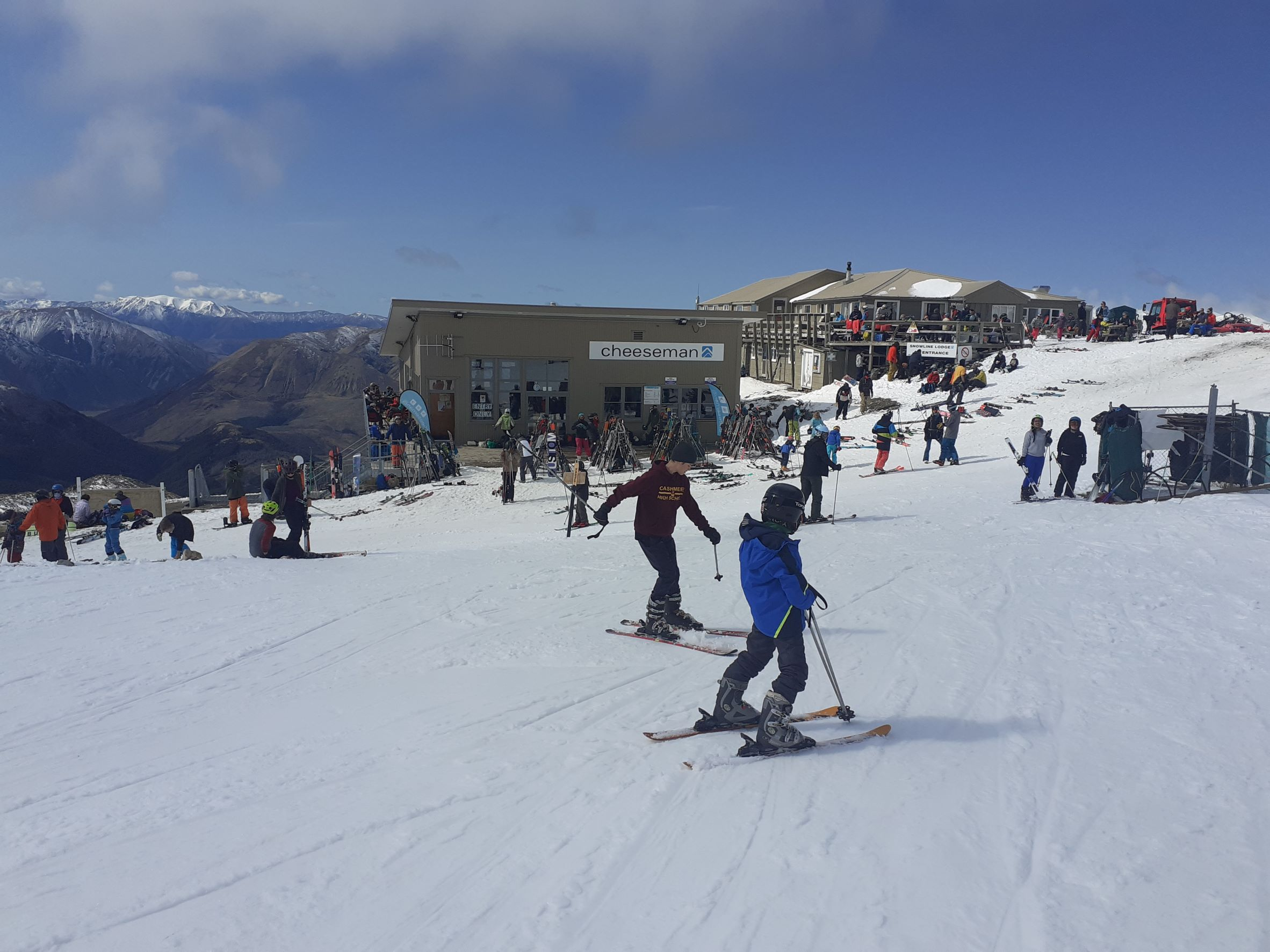
Mount Cheeseman base building (left) and the Snowline Lodge (right). (2021)

There is accommodation for 68 people in the onsite Snowline Lodge, and for 38 in the nearby Forest Lodge.

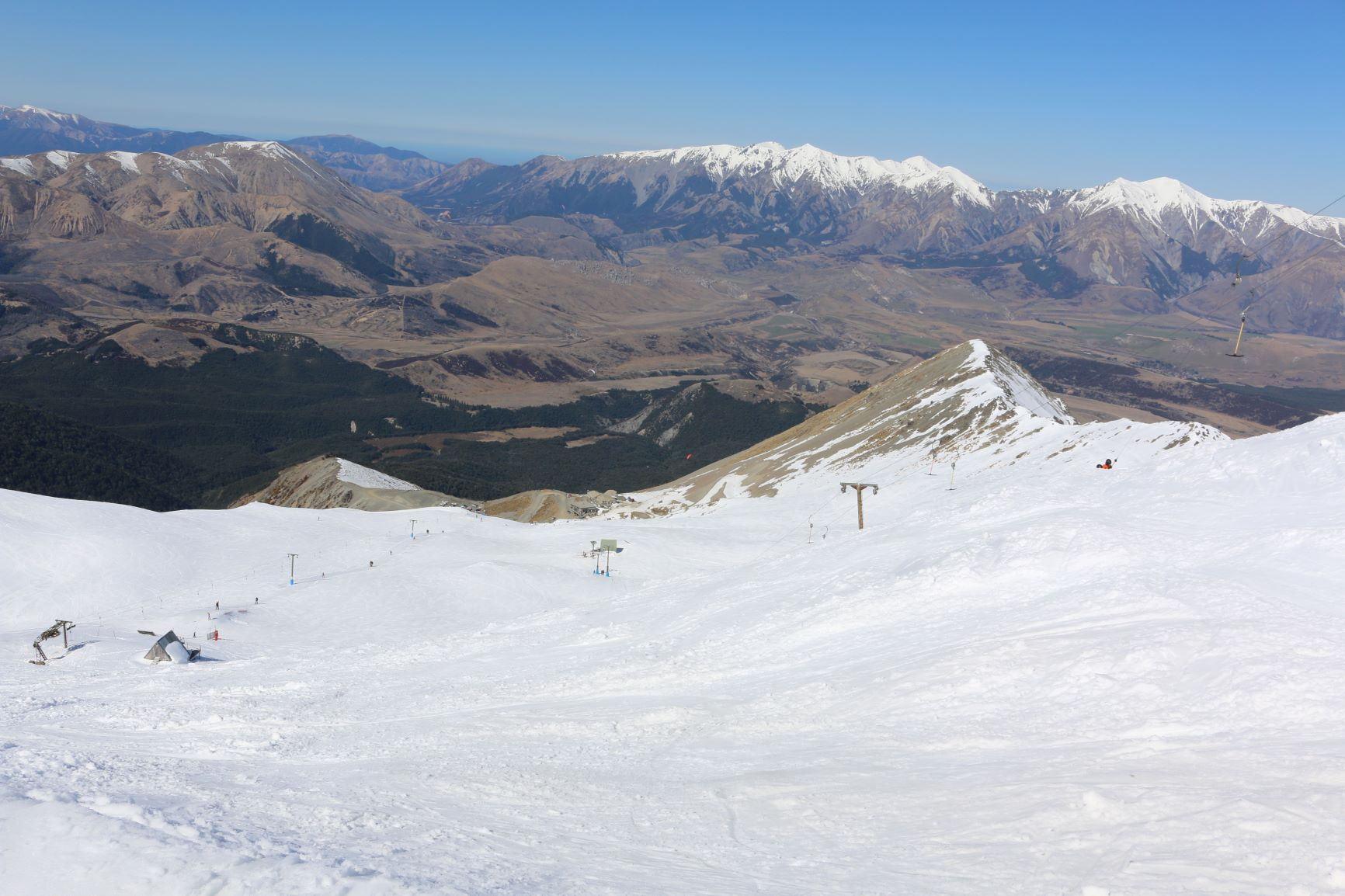
Looking down on the Mount Cheeseman ski field

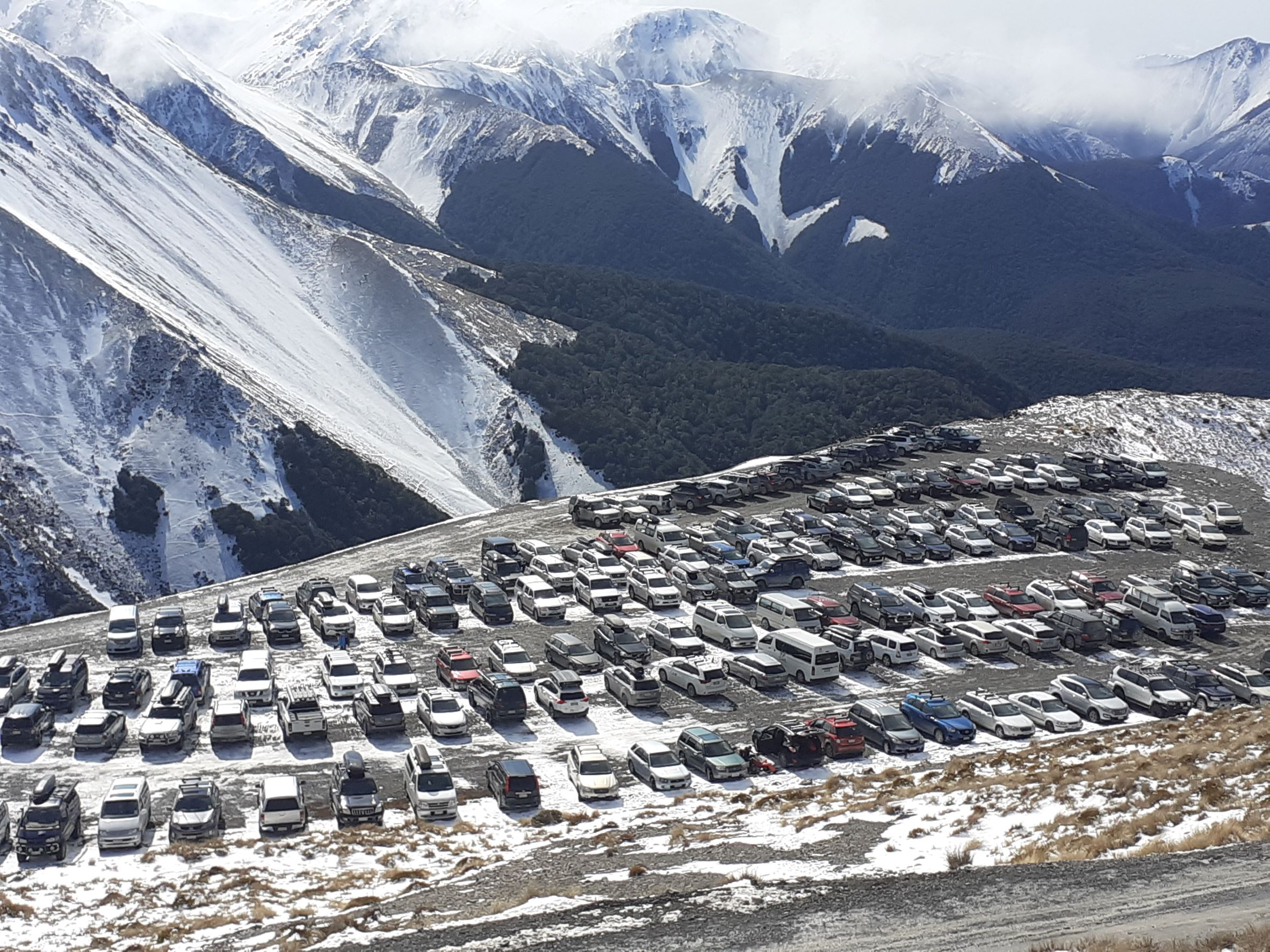
Mt Cheeseman carpark (2021)

It is named for the botanist Thomas Frederic Cheeseman, who was curator of Auckland Museum and a recipient of the Linnean Medal.
