= Broken River Ski Area =

Ski field in Canterbury, New Zealand

Coordinates: 43.125100°S 171.676000°E

Broken River
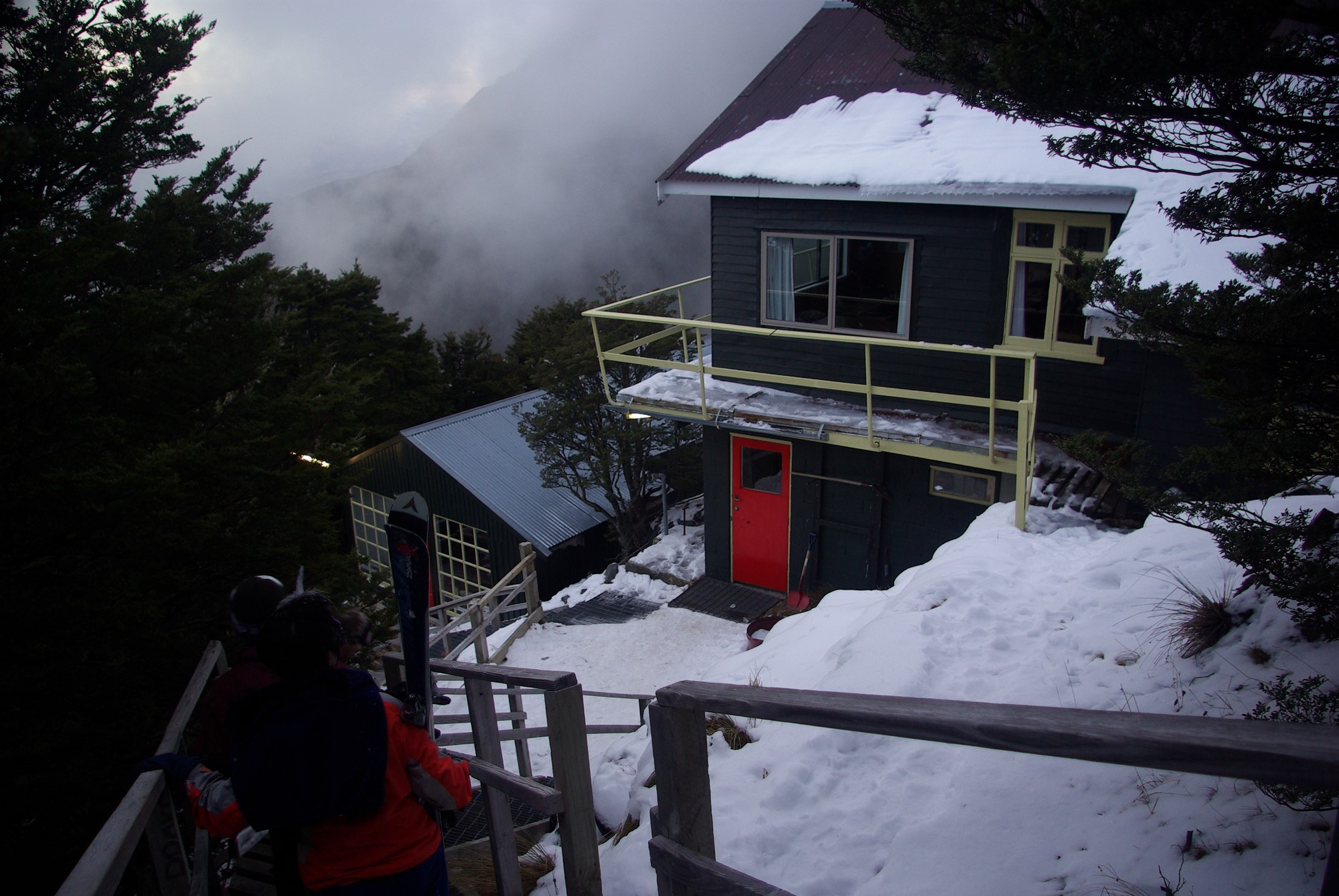
- Interactive map of Broken River
- Nearest city: Christchurch
- Vertical: 400 m (1,312 ft)
- Top elevation: 1,820 m (5,971 ft)
- Base elevation: 1,420 m (4,659 ft)
- Skiable area: 900 hectares (2,224 acres)
- Trails: Backcountry
- Lift system: 5 rope tows
- Terrain parks: 1
- Snowmaking: No
- Night skiing: Yes
- Website: www.brokenriver.co.nz

Broken River is a club skifield in South Island, New Zealand. Run by the Broken River Ski Club, it is located at about 110 km (68 mi) from Christchurch. The skifield claims to often have the longest ski season anywhere in Australasia. Also, by connecting with Craigieburn Valley, it claims to have the largest skiable area in New Zealand, at 900 hectares (2,224 acres).

The grounds encompass a large, open basin with five ski tows and a skiable range from an altitude of 1,420 to 1,820 metres (4,660 to 5,970 feet). The difficulty distribution is 10% beginner, 40% intermediate, 50% advanced.

Accommodation is in the form of three lodges: the full-service Lyndon Lodge, the more basic 28-bed Broken River Lodge, and the very basic 14-bed White Star Chalet for backpackers. Access to the accommodation is via a 15- to 30-minute walk from the carpark. There is a passenger lift (formerly a goods lift) between the carpark and the accommodation.

The field also has a day lodge, Palmer Lodge, which has self-catering available as well as food and drink availability.

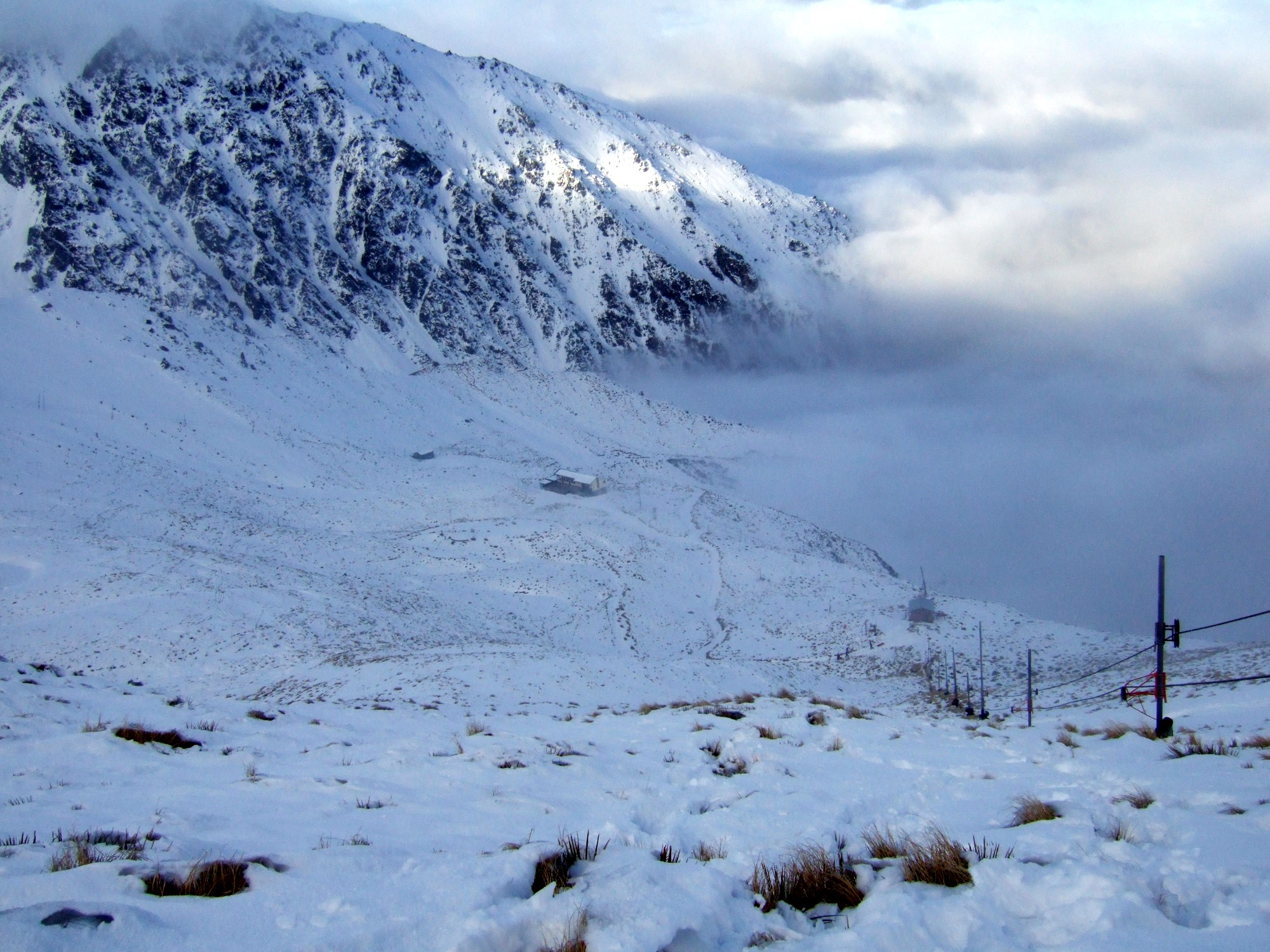
Looking down from the main tow. (July 2007)

== Climate ==
Climate data for Broken River Ski Area, 1,554 m (5,098 ft) (1966–1986)
Month	Jan	Feb	Mar	Apr	May	Jun	Jul	Aug	Sep	Oct	Nov	Dec	Year
Record high °C (°F)	24.0 (75.2)	25.0 (77.0)	22.4 (72.3)	18.2 (64.8)	13.3 (55.9)	11.1 (52.0)	9.1 (48.4)	13.5 (56.3)	14.6 (58.3)	15.0 (59.0)	22.5 (72.5)	20.2 (68.4)	25.0 (77.0)
Mean maximum °C (°F)	20.5 (68.9)	20.4 (68.7)	17.5 (63.5)	13.7 (56.7)	10.5 (50.9)	7.8 (46.0)	6.2 (43.2)	6.9 (44.4)	8.8 (47.8)	12.3 (54.1)	16.1 (61.0)	18.3 (64.9)	21.6 (70.9)
Mean daily maximum °C (°F)	12.9 (55.2)	13.7 (56.7)	11.3 (52.3)	8.1 (46.6)	4.7 (40.5)	2.2 (36.0)	1.0 (33.8)	1.7 (35.1)	3.3 (37.9)	6.0 (42.8)	8.5 (47.3)	11.5 (52.7)	7.1 (44.7)
Daily mean °C (°F)	8.8 (47.8)	9.5 (49.1)	7.7 (45.9)	4.9 (40.8)	1.9 (35.4)	−0.5 (31.1)	−1.7 (28.9)	−1.1 (30.0)	0.4 (32.7)	2.6 (36.7)	4.8 (40.6)	7.5 (45.5)	3.7 (38.7)
Mean daily minimum °C (°F)	5.0 (41.0)	5.3 (41.5)	4.1 (39.4)	1.7 (35.1)	−1 (30)	−3.3 (26.1)	−4.2 (24.4)	−4.1 (24.6)	−2.7 (27.1)	−0.8 (30.6)	1.1 (34.0)	3.4 (38.1)	0.4 (32.7)
Mean minimum °C (°F)	−2 (28)	−1.7 (28.9)	−2.6 (27.3)	−4.7 (23.5)	−7.5 (18.5)	−9.0 (15.8)	−9.5 (14.9)	−10.2 (13.6)	−8.5 (16.7)	−7.3 (18.9)	−5.1 (22.8)	−3.3 (26.1)	−11.1 (12.0)
Record low °C (°F)	−6.7 (19.9)	−5.8 (21.6)	−7.0 (19.4)	−8.6 (16.5)	−10.2 (13.6)	−11.5 (11.3)	−12.2 (10.0)	−14.5 (5.9)	−11.4 (11.5)	−10.3 (13.5)	−9.0 (15.8)	−5.7 (21.7)	−14.5 (5.9)
Source: NIWA

== See also ==
- List of funicular railways
