= State Highway 73 (New Zealand) =

Road in New Zealand

State Highway 73

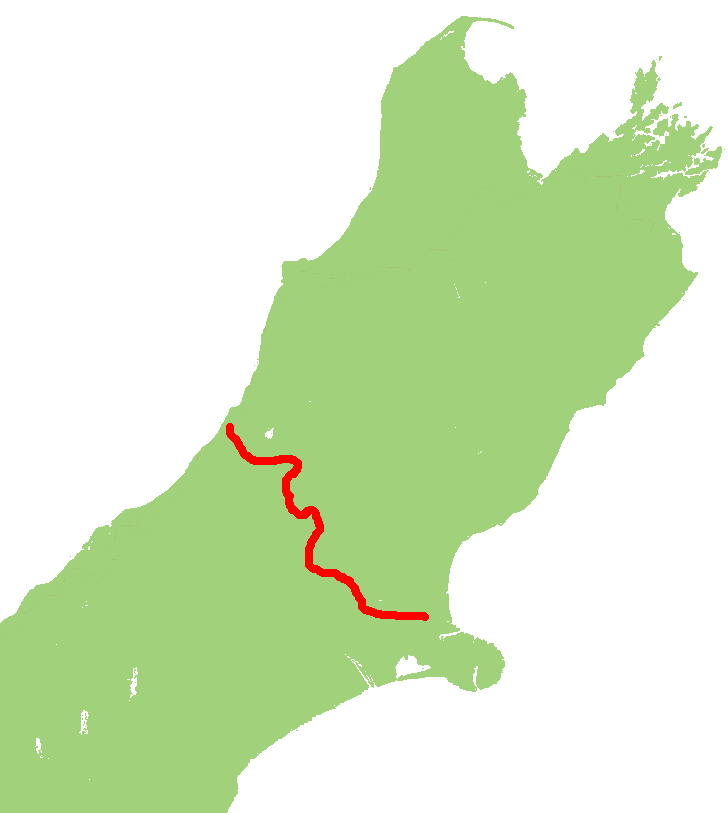

Route information
- Maintained by NZ Transport Agency Waka Kotahi
- Length: 231 km (144 mi)
- Tourist routes: Great Alpine Highway; Christchurch Ring Road; Inland Scenic Route between Sheffield and Waddington.

Major junctions
- Northwest end: SH 6 at Kumara Junction
- Southeast end: SH 75 (Curletts Road)/ SH 76 (Christchurch Southern Motorway) at Middleton, New Zealand

Location
- Country: New Zealand
- Primary destinations: Kumara, Dillmanstown, Jacksons, Otira, Arthur's Pass, Bealey, Cass, Castle Hill Village, Springfield, Sheffield, Waddington, Darfield, Kirwee, Aylesbury, West Melton, Yaldhurst, Christchurch

Highway system
- New Zealand state highways; Motorways and expressways; List
← SH 71	→ SH 74

State Highway 73 (SH 73) is a major east-west South Island state highway in New Zealand connecting Christchurch on the east coast with Cass/Hokitika via the Southern Alps. It is mostly two lane, with some single-lane bridges north of Springfield but is mostly dual carriageway in Christchurch. The fourth and fifth-highest points of New Zealand's state highway network are on this road at Porters Pass and Arthur's Pass respectively.

== History ==
The route connecting the West and East coasts of the South Island via the Southern Alps were known for hundreds of years by the Māori people, due to a flourishing pounamu trade. The Europeans were informed of the route by a local chief in the mid-19th century but was not used during his lifetime. In 1864, Arthur Dudley Dobson traversed from the east to the west coast from the Waimakariri River, thereby discovering Arthur's Pass. A route connecting Christchurch to Hokitika was fully completed in 1866, with the first Cobb & Co coach began operating that same year for the burgeoning gold rush.

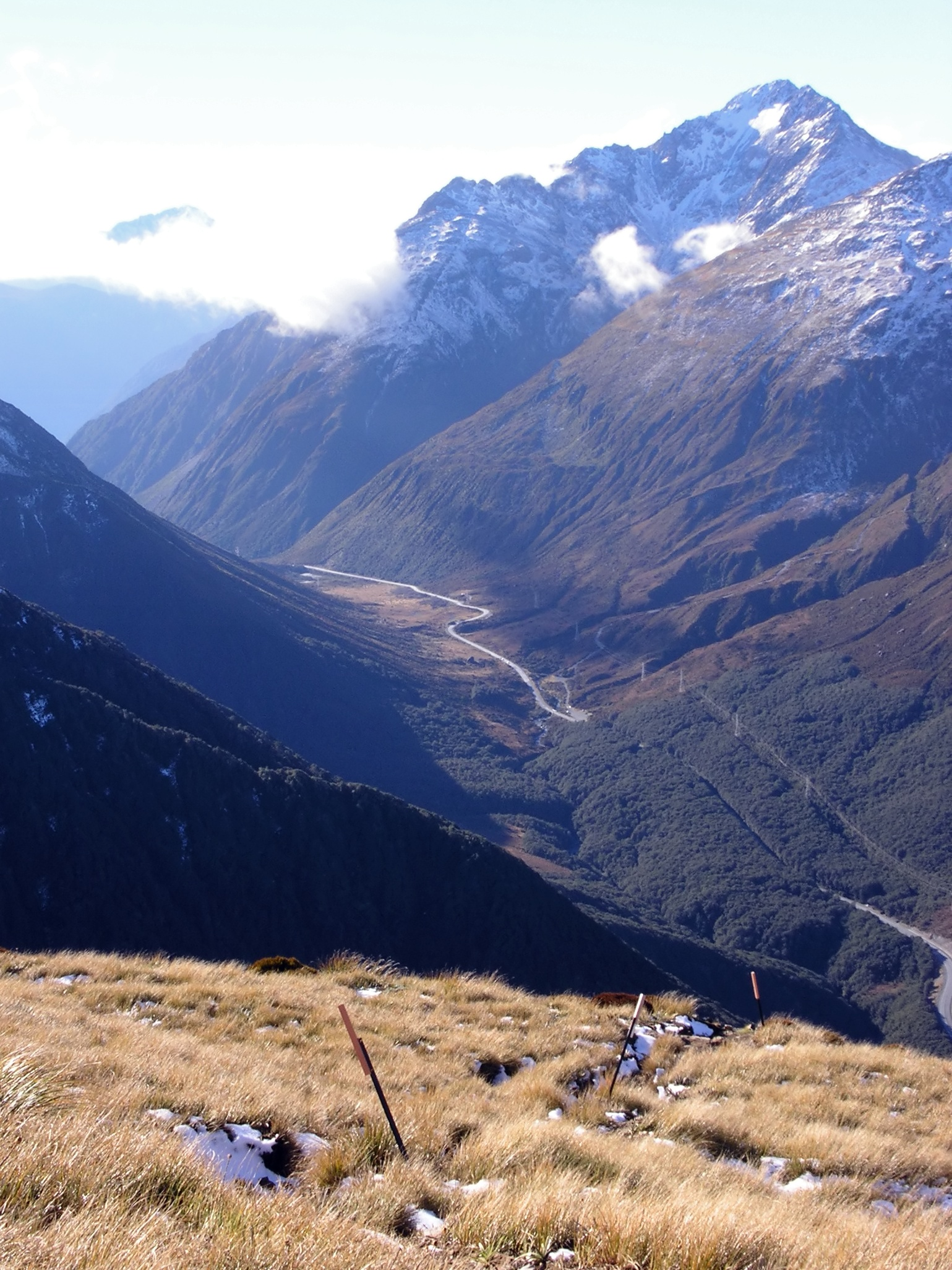
SH 73 through Arthur's Pass

Construction of a rail link had started in 1890, and the Midland Line between Canterbury and the West Coast was finally completed on 4 August 1923, with the opening of the Otira Tunnel. This signalled the end of the Cobb & Co coach in New Zealand. When the section of the line from Springfield to Broken River in Canterbury was opened in 1906, it was then possible to travel from Canterbury to the West Coast in a single day with a 40-mile (64 km) coach journey between the railheads at Broken River and Otira.

Due to the geography and topography between Springfield and Kumara, the road has been subjected to several closures and road realignments, with both Porters and Arthur's Pass subjected to frequent closures during the winter months. The road between Arthur's Pass and Otira in particular was amongst the most dangerous in the country, due to the road located on scree slopes which frequently gave way. As a result, numerous studies were conducted into alternative options for fixing the road around Candy's Bend, Starvation Point and the Zig Zag. Construction of the Otira Viaduct and the protective roofs from slips began in 1997 and opened in 1999.

== Route ==
=== Kumara Junction to Christchurch ===
State Highway 73 begins 11 km south of Greymouth at Kumara Junction. The highway passes through undulating farmland, scrubland and forest as it passes through the settlements of Kumara and Dillmanstown. The road veers sharply to the left as it approaches the mountains to the front of the road. The road then hugs the Taramakau River as it proceeds down the valley. At Jacksons, the Midland Line crosses the river and begins to run parallel to the road. Just before Aickens at the confluence of the Taramakau and Otira Rivers, the road and rail line veers to the right and runs to the south before reaching Otira.

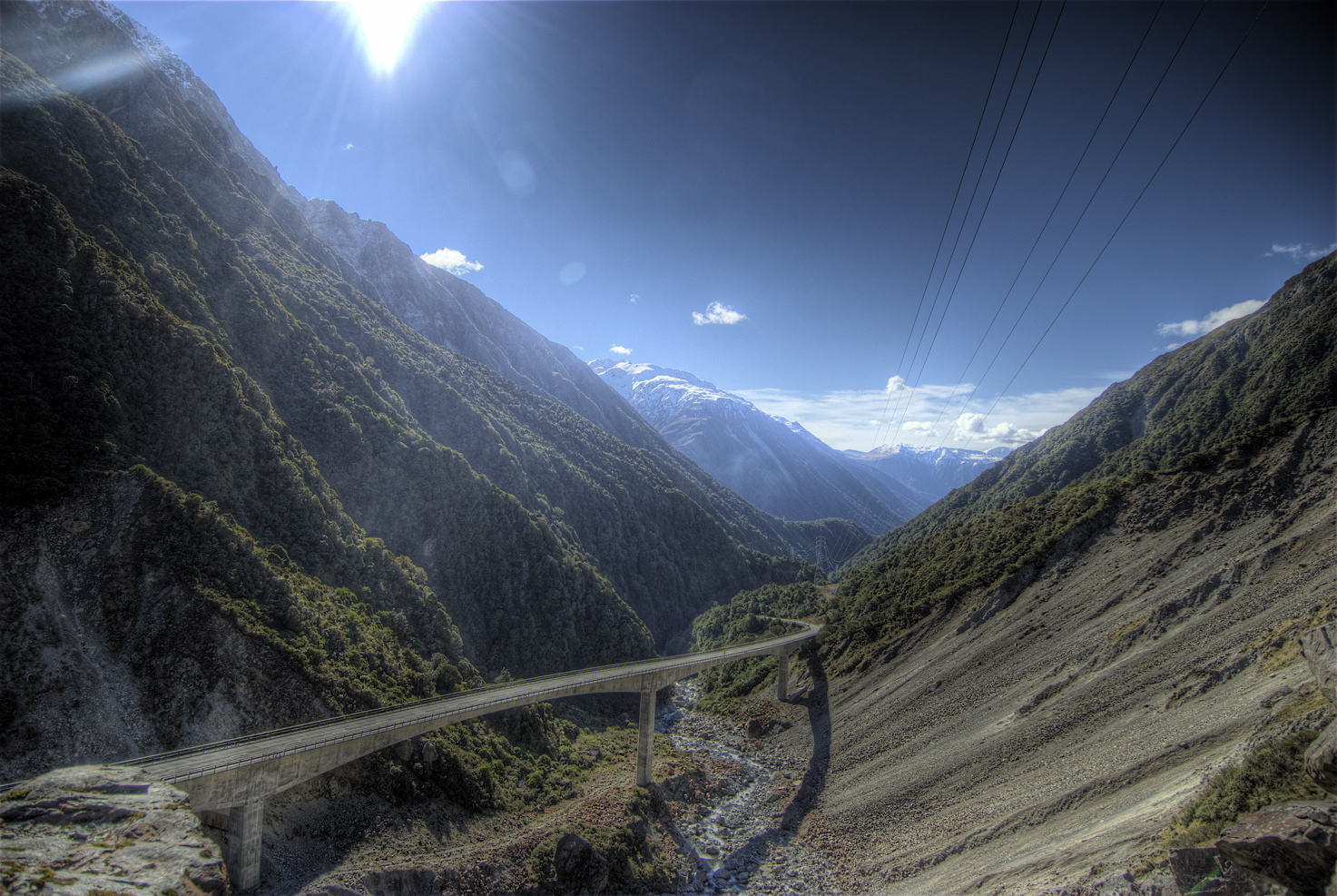
The Otira Viaduct

Beyond Otira, the road breaks with the railway line and crosses the river before climbing up towards the Otira Viaduct and Arthur's Pass. At an elevation of 920 m (3,020 ft), Arthur's Pass is the second highest pass on the road and is one of the three alpine passes connecting the east and west coasts. After peaking, the road descends into Arthur's Pass village with the railway line emerging from the Otira Tunnel nearby.

After the village, the road and rail line runs along the Bealey River valley and crosses the Waimakariri River on the Bealey Bridge before veering left and running parallel to both the river and the rail line on the opposite side. Before Cass, the road runs along a bluff and turns right to proceed past some more farmland as well as Lakes Grasmere and Pearson.

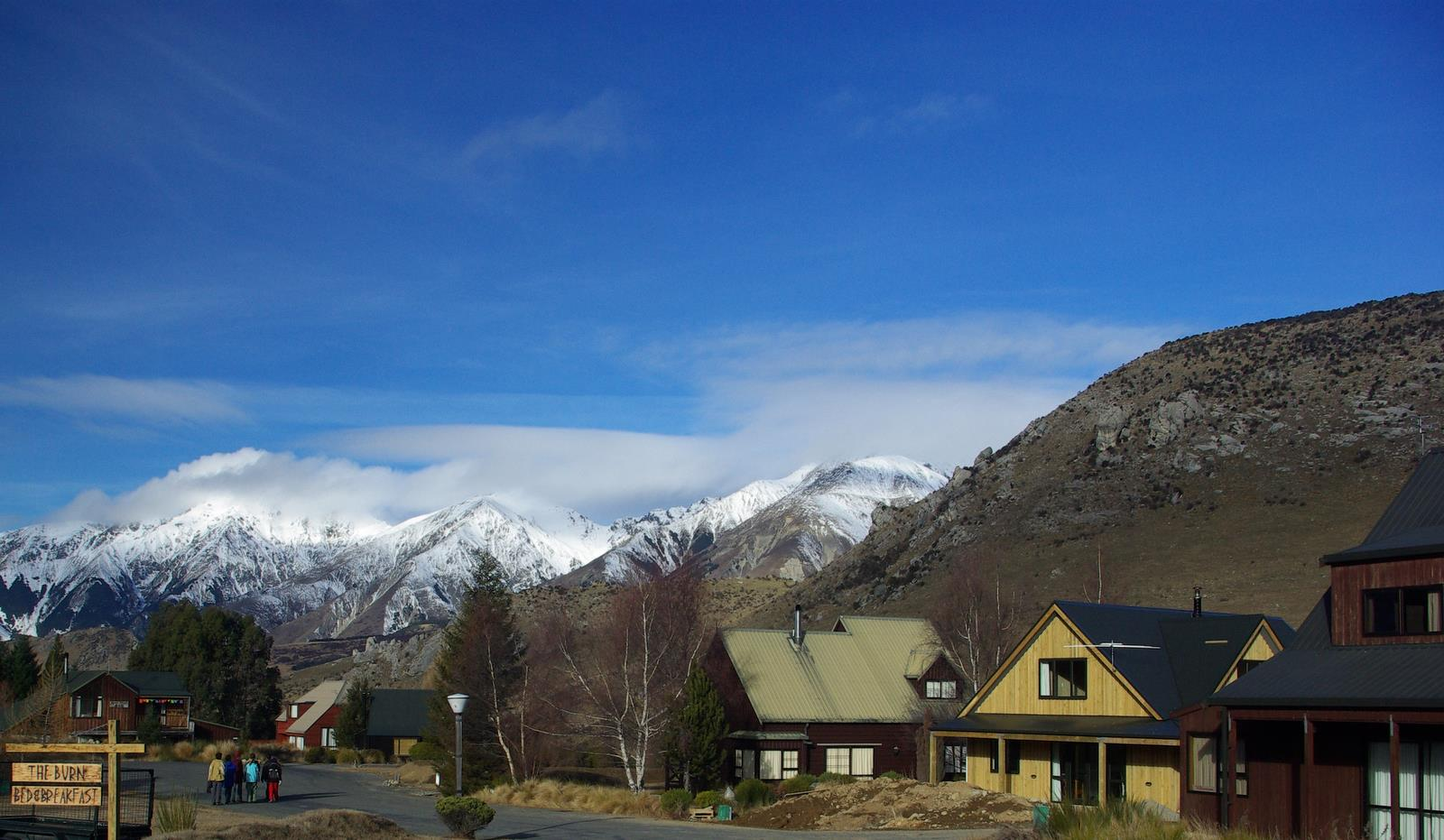
Castle Hill Village

The road then climbs up towards Castle Hill Village and runs through a valley before passing beside Lake Lyndon where it curves left before climbing up towards Porters Pass which, at 939 metres, is the highest point on the road. After cresting, the road descends into the Kowai River valley and runs roughly parallel with the river until it reaches Springfield.

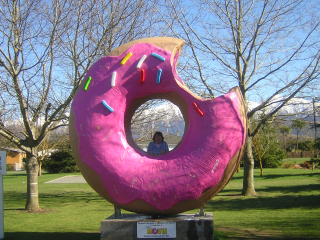
The former Springfield doughnut with Mount Torlesse in the background

After Springfield, the road emerges onto the Canterbury Plains and runs straight through the settlements of Annat, Sheffield and Waddington before arriving at Darfield. The road then passes through the settlements of Kirwee, Aylesbury and West Melton as well as dairy and lifestyle farms characteristic of the plains. The road passes by Paparua Prison and arrives in Christchurch via Yaldhurst.

=== Christchurch ===
As Yaldhurst Road, the highway proceeds in an easterly direction towards Riccarton, widening to four lanes at Avonhead. At Curletts Road/Peer Street, the highway turns right (while Yaldhurst Road becomes Riccarton Road and heads towards the city centre).

As Curletts Road, the road remains as four lanes divided by a flush median. After Blenheim Road, the road widens again, crosses over the Main South Line and eventually terminates at the Christchurch Southern Motorway (SH 76).

== Route changes ==
Over the past 40 years SH 73 has been subjected to several route changes both in the Christchurch and the Arthur's Pass-Otira areas. In the early years SH 73 originally ended at the Blenheim Road and Hansons Lane corner in Upper Riccarton. In 1999, one of the worst sections of highway in the country (around Candy's Bend) were replaced with the Otira Viaduct. Meanwhile, in Christchurch, since SH 1 was rerouted to bypass the CBD, SH 73 was extended to Brougham Street/Waltham Road intersection, with the rest of the route covered by SH 74.

In 2004, with SH 74 being rerouted to run along the Ring Road and the entire length of Tunnel Road instead of through the CBD, SH 73 was extended further to the Port Hills Road interchange on SH 74. It was also rerouted from the intersection of Blenheim Road to follow Curletts Road and Yaldhurst Road, instead of via Main South Road through Hornby, meeting back again with SH 1 at the intersection of Masham and Russley Roads.

As of December 2012, with the extension of the Christchurch Southern Motorway, the section of SH 73 east of Curletts Road was re-gazetted as SH 76 in line with the new motorway extension.

== Former spur sections ==
State Highway 73A was a spur section of SH 73 connecting the suburbs of Hornby, New Zealand and Sockburn, New Zealand via Main South Road and Blenheim Road. Before 2004 it formed part of the old route of SH 73 and further before that SH 1. It was one of the few state highways in New Zealand to be wholly dual carriageway. In 2014, the entire highway has been revoked due to completion of the Christchurch Southern Motorway (gazetted SH 76 in 2012) which runs almost parallel to this route.

== Major junctions ==
Territorial authority	Location	km	mi	Destinations	Notes
Christchurch City	Middleton-Hillmorton-Wigram tripoint	0– 0.2	0.0– 0.12	SH 76 (Christchurch Southern Motorway) – CBD, Lyttelton, Timaru	SH 73 begins Dumbbell interchange favouring Christchurch Southern Motorway; Continues as SH 75 (Curletts Road) to Akaroa
Christchurch City	Sockburn-Upper Riccarton boundary			Peer Street northbound – Ilam; Yaldhurst Road – Riccarton, City Centre	Traffic on SH 73 must turn here. Christchurch Ring Road northern concurrency terminus
Christchurch City	Russley-Broomfield boundary			SH 1 north (Russley Road) – Belfast, Picton; SH 1 south (Masham Road) – Hornby, Timaru	
Selwyn District	West Melton	41	25	SH 77 (Bangor Road) – Mount Hutt, Methven, Ashburton	
Selwyn District	Waddington			Inland Scenic Route (Deans Road) – Mount Hutt, Methven, Ashburton	Inland Scenic Route southern concurrency terminus
Selwyn District	Waddington	52	32	Inland Scenic Route (Waimakariri Gorge Road) – Oxford, Rangiora, Amberley	Inland Scenic Route northern concurrency terminus
Selwyn District	Springfield-Castle Hill Village boundary	81	50	Porters Pass 939 m (3,081 ft)	Access to lookout
Waimakariri River		136	85	Bealey Bridge	
Selwyn District-Westland District boundary	Arthur's Pass-Otira boundary	151	94	Arthur's Pass (920 m (3,020 ft))	
Ōtira River		153	95	Otira Viaduct	
Westland District	Kumara Junction	226	140	SH 6 south – Hokitika, Haast; SH 6 north – Greymouth, Westport	Hokitika Line bisects roundabout SH 73 ends
1.000 mi = 1.609 km; 1.000 km = 0.621 mi: Concurrency terminus; Incomplete access; Route transition

== See also ==
- List of New Zealand state highways
