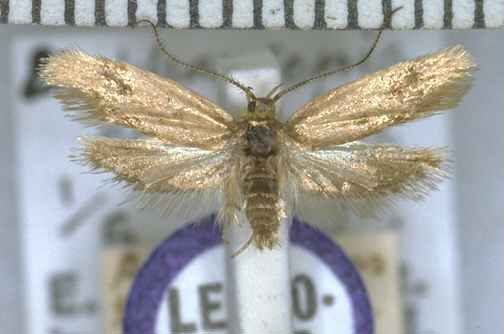
- Lectotype

Scientific classification
- Kingdom: Animalia
- Phylum: Arthropoda
- Class: Insecta
- Order: Lepidoptera
- Family: Oecophoridae
- Genus: Tingena
- Species: T. epichalca

Binomial name
- Tingena epichalca (Meyrick, 1886)

Synonyms
- Cremnogenes epichalca Meyrick, 1886; Borkhausenia epichalca (Meyrick, 1886)

= Tingena epichalca =

Species of moth, endemic to New Zealand

Tingena epichalca is a species of moth in the family Oecophoridae. It is endemic to New Zealand and has been observed at Arthur's Pass and in the mountains around Otira. This species is very similar in appearance to Tingena aphrontis but can be distinguished on the basis of different antennal ciliations of the male of the species. Adults are on the wing in January and inhabit alpine zones, frequenting alpine vegetation on the edge of screes at altitudes of between 3 – 4000 ft.

== Taxonomy ==
This species was originally described by Edward Meyrick in 1886 using specimens collected at Arthur's Pass in January and named Cremnogenes epichalca. In 1915 Meyrick discussed this species under the name Borkhausenia epichalca. In 1926 Alfred Philpott discussed and illustrated the genitalia of the male of this species. In 1928 George Hudson also discussed and illustrated this species in his book The butterflies and moths of New Zealand. In 1988 J. S. Dugdale placed this species within the genus Tingena. The male lectotype is held at the Natural History Museum, London.

== Description ==
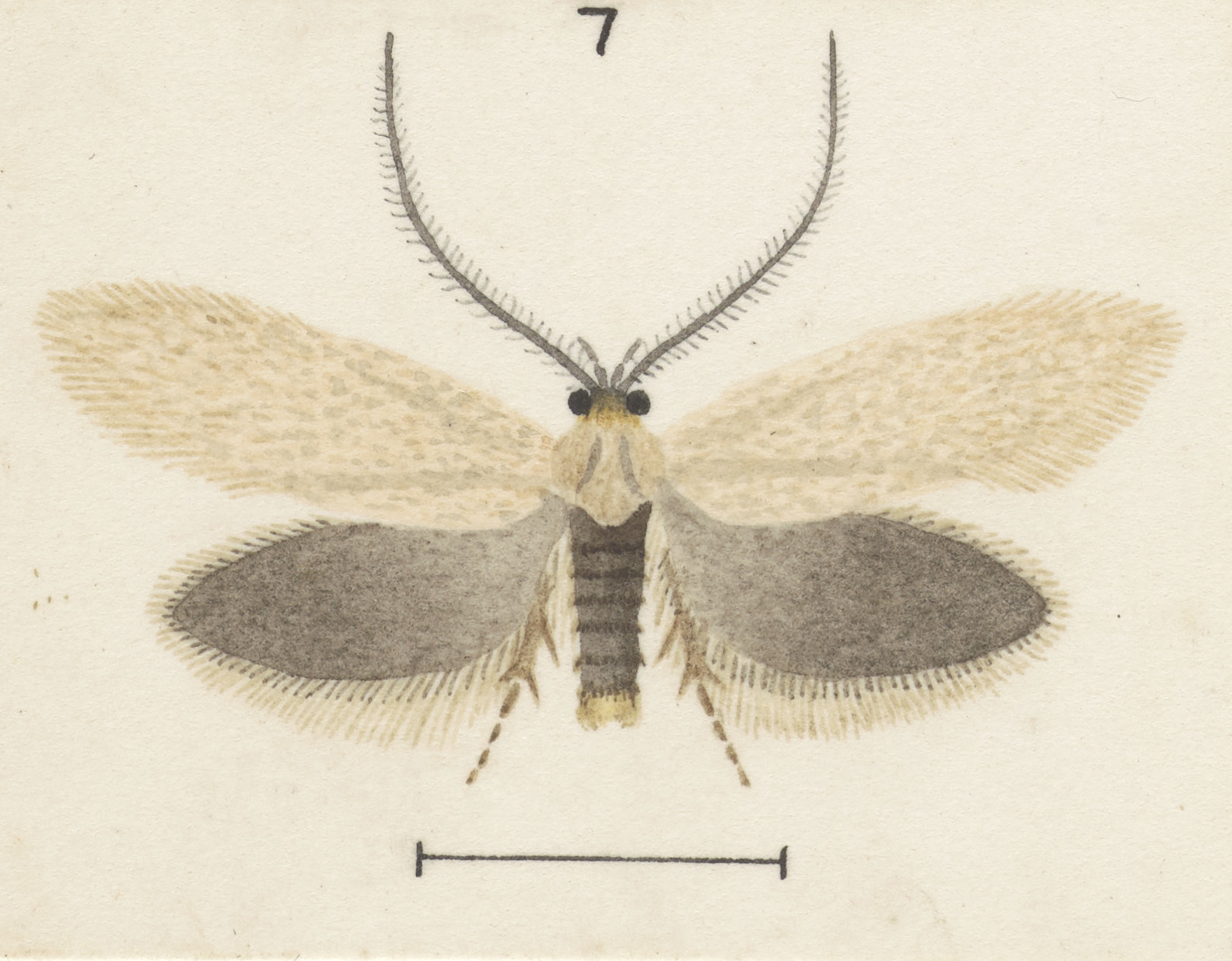
Illustration of T. epichalca by George Hudson.

Meyrick described this species as follows:

♂12-15 mm. Head, palpi, and thorax shining bronzy-ochreous. Antennae dark bronzy-fuscous, ciliations 2 1/2, whorled. Abdomen dark bronzy-grey. Legs bronzy-ochreous, anterior pair suffused with grey. Forewings elongate, costa moderately arched, apex round-pointed, hindmargin very obliquely rounded; shining bronzy-ochreous, usually without markings; rarely a dot on fold, a second in disc beyond middle, and a posterior transverse angulated line obscurely grey : cilia pale bronzy-ochreous. Hindwings grey, with purplish reflections; cilia pale greyish-ochreous.

This species is very similar in appearance to Tingena aphrontis but can be distinguished on the basis of different antennal ciliations of the male of the species. The species varies in depth of colouration.

== Distribution ==
This species is endemic to New Zealand and has been observed at its type locality of Arthur's Pass. It has also been observed in the mountains around Otira at altitudes of approximately 3000 ft.

== Behaviour ==
The adults of this species are on the wing in January.

== Habitat ==
This species inhabits alpine zones and is associated with alpine vegetation on the boarder of scree slopes at altitudes of between 3000 and 4000 ft.
