= Glyphipterix erastis =

Scientific classification
- Kingdom: Animalia
- Phylum: Arthropoda
- Clade: Pancrustacea
- Class: Insecta
- Order: Lepidoptera
- Family: Glyphipterigidae
- Genus: Glyphipterix
- Species: G. erastis

Binomial name
- Glyphipterix erastis Meyrick, 1911

Synonyms
- Glyphipteryx erastis Meyrick, 1911

Species of moth endemic to New Zealand

Glyphipterix erastis is a species of sedge moth in the genus Glyphipterix. It was first described by Edward Meyrick in 1911. It is endemic to New Zealand and has been observed in the North and South Islands. G. erastis inhabits open grassy spaces close to native forest or scrub. It is also known to inhabit coastal cushion fields. The larvae are likely stem miners of grasses, tussocks or sedges. Adults are day flying and are on the wing from November until March. There is variation in the depth of the ground colouring and also the intensity of the markings on the wings of this moth.

== Taxonomy ==
This species was first described by Edward Meyrick in 1911 using specimens collected at Castle Hill and Lake Wakatipu. In 1927 Alfred Philpott discussed and illustrated the male genitalia of this species. George Hudson discussed and illustrated this species in his 1928 book The butterflies and moths of New Zealand. The male lectotype, collected at Lake Wakatipu, is held at the Natural History Museum, London.

== Description ==
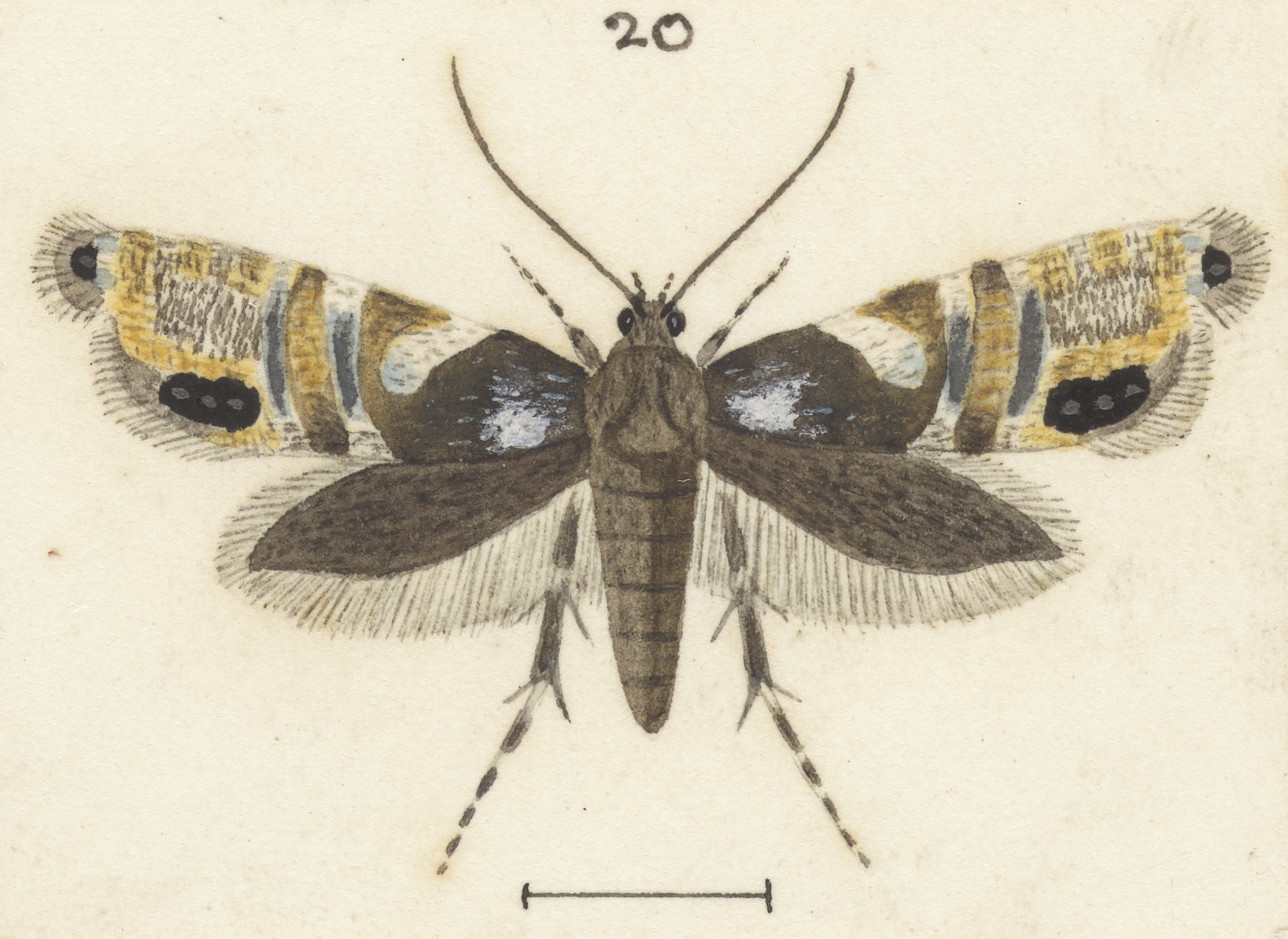
Illustration by Hudson.

Moth at rest.

Meyrick originally described the adults of this species as follows:

♂♀. 8-10 mm. Head and thorax fuscous-bronze. Palpi with appressed scales, white, with four black bands. Antennae dark fuscous. Abdomen dark fuscous, segmental margins somewhat whitish-suffused. Forewings elongate, costa gently arched, apex obtuse, termen somewhat sinuate, rather strongly oblique; rather dark bronzy-fuscous, median third suffused with bronzy-ochreous ; an oblique whitish fascia near base, more or less indistinct towards costa, dilated into a triangular spot on lower half ; a wedge-shaped rather oblique whitish mark from costa at 1/3, reaching more than half across wing ; two narrow straight prismatic-silvery fasciae in and beyond middle, becoming whitish towards extremities, first more broadly ; three short wedge-shaped whitish marks on costa posteriorly ; an elongate black blotch along lower half of termen containing three violet-golden-metallic spots ; space between this and costal marks traversed by six longitudinal suffused whitish streaks, separated by blackish scales ; prismatic-silvery dots beneath costa near apex, at apex, and on termen beneath apex : cilia whitish, basal third bronzy-ochreous limited by a dark-fuscous line indented with whitish beneath apex. Hindwings and cilia dark fuscous.

There is variation in the depth of the ground colouring and also the intensity of the markings of this moth.

== Distribution ==
G. erastis is endemic to New Zealand. It has been observed in both the North and South Islands.

== Habitat and hosts ==
This species frequents open spaces close to native forest or scrub and can also be observed in domestic gardens. It also occurs in coastal cushion plant fields. The larvae of this species are likely stem miners of grasses, tussocks or sedges.

== Behaviour ==
Adults are day flying and are on the wing from November until March. Adults are most active in late afternoons when the sun is shining.
