= Castle Hill Village =

Settlement in Canterbury, New Zealand

- Township
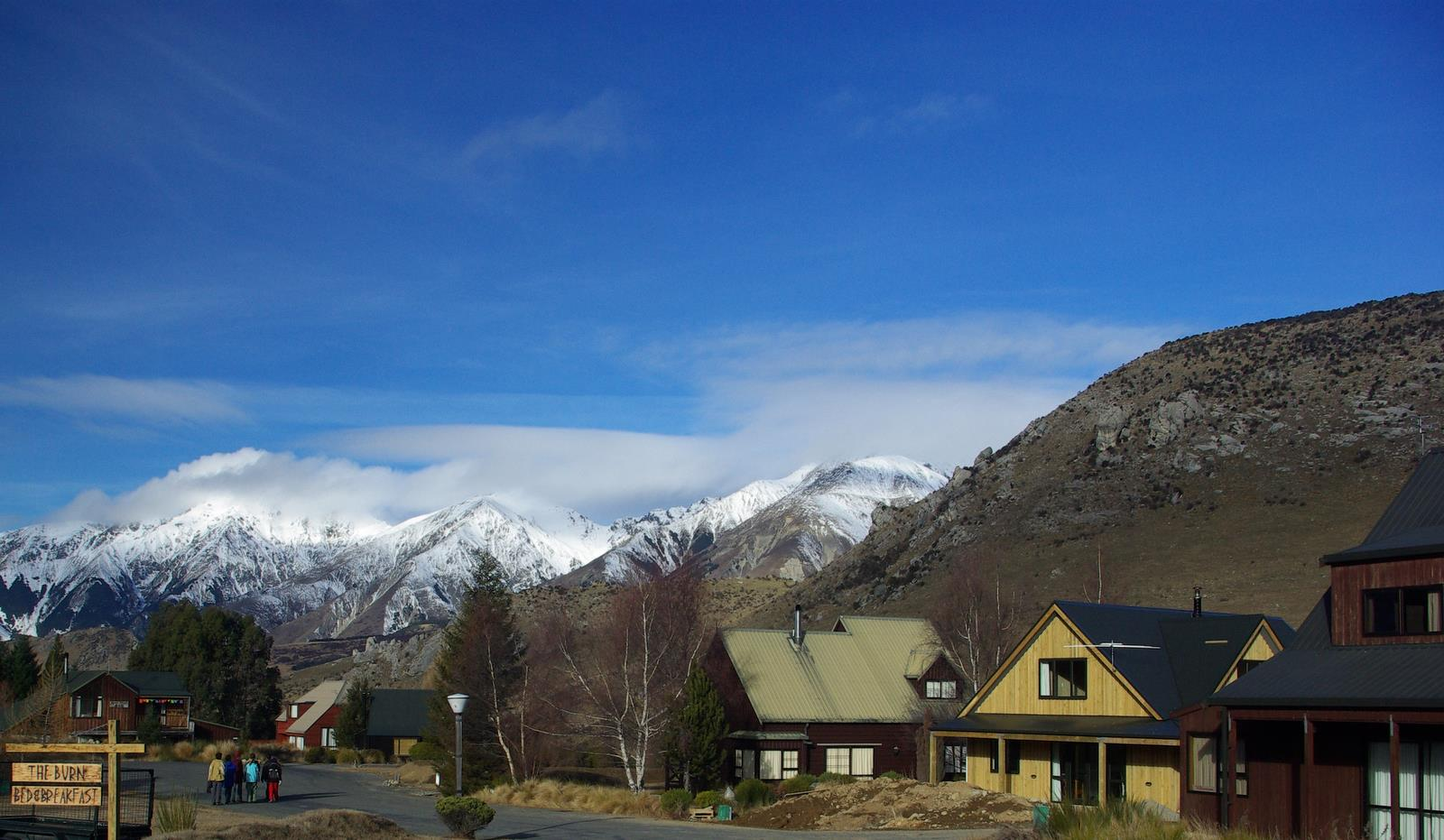
- Castle Hill Village
- Interactive map of Castle Hill Village
- Coordinates: 43.208938°S 171.714745°E
- Country: New Zealand
- Region: Canterbury
- District: Selwyn
- Ward: Malvern
- Community: Malvern
- Founded: 1982
- Electorates: Selwyn; Te Tai Tonga (Māori)

Government
  - Territorial Authority: Selwyn District Council
  - Regional council: Environment Canterbury
  - Mayor of Selwyn: Lydia Gliddon
  - Selwyn MP: Nicola Grigg
  - Te Tai Tonga MP: Tākuta Ferris

Area
  - Total: 0.61 km^{2} (0.24 sq mi)
- Elevation: 739 m (2,425 ft)

Population (June 2025)
  - Total: 80
  - Density: 130/km^{2} (340/sq mi)
- Time zone: UTC+12 (NZST)
  - Summer (DST): UTC+13 (NZDT)
- Postcode: 7580
- Area code: 03

Castle Hill Village is an alpine village in Canterbury, New Zealand that was established in 1982.

== Location ==
Castle Hill Village is located in Selwyn District. It is located adjacent to State Highway 73 just north of the Thomas River. Nearby are the distinctive limestone boulders of Castle Hill. The boulders are located within the Kura Tawhiti Conservation Area. The Craigieburn Range forms the backdrop for the location.

== History ==
During the time of the West Coast gold rush in the mid-1860s, a hotel was built along the coach road that is now State Highway 73; traces of Castle Hill Hotel can be found immediately opposite to Castle Hill Village. The coach traffic disappeared when the Midland Line was extended to Arthur's Pass just prior to World War I; this withdrew the financial basis for the hotel.

After sub-dividing land from his high country Castle Hill Station in 1981, John Reid started the village in 1982. The first sections on sale for $10,000. Reid later sold his remaining land holdings except for the land opposite the village for a 9-hole golf course.

== Demographics ==
Castle Hill Village is described by Stats NZ as a rural settlement, and covers 0.61 km^{2} (0.24 sq mi). It had an estimated population of 80 as of June 2025, with a population density of 131 people per km^{2}. It is part of the statistical area of Craigieburn.

Historical population
Year	Pop.	±% p.a.
2006	9	—
2013	45	+25.85%
2018	18	−16.74%
2023	42	+18.47%

Castle Hill had a population of 42 in the 2023 New Zealand census, an increase of 24 people (133.3%) since the 2018 census, and a decrease of 3 people (−6.7%) since the 2013 census. There were 21 males and 21 females in 27 dwellings. The median age was 50.8 years (compared with 38.1 years nationally). There were 6 people (14.3%) aged under 15 years, 3 (7.1%) aged 15 to 29, 18 (42.9%) aged 30 to 64, and 15 (35.7%) aged 65 or older.

People could identify as more than one ethnicity. The results were 100.0% European (Pākehā); 7.1% Māori; and 7.1% Middle Eastern, Latin American and African New Zealanders (MELAA). English was spoken by 100.0%, and other languages by 14.3%. The percentage of people born overseas was 14.3, compared with 28.8% nationally.

The sole religious affiliation given was 28.6% Christian. People who answered that they had no religion were 71.4%.

Of those at least 15 years old, 18 (50.0%) people had a bachelor's or higher degree, 18 (50.0%) had a post-high school certificate or diploma, and 3 (8.3%) people exclusively held high school qualifications. The median income was $35,000, compared with $41,500 nationally. 3 people (8.3%) earned over $100,000 compared to 12.1% nationally. The employment status of those at least 15 was 18 (50.0%) full-time and 6 (16.7%) part-time.

== Today ==
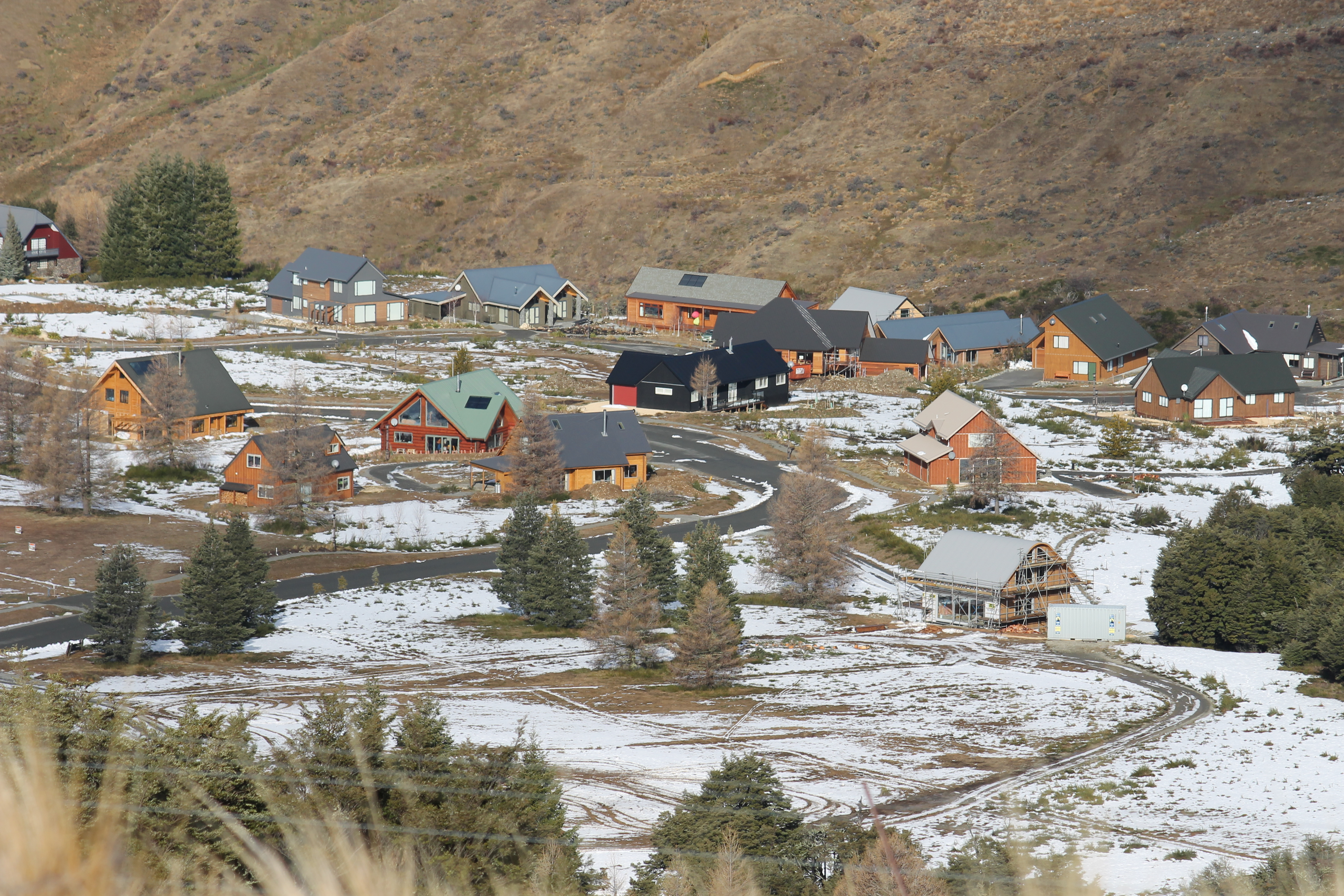
Castle Hill Village in June 2012

In 2022, there were over 150 houses in the village. Most are holiday homes but some have permanent residents, including Reid who still lives there. A daily school bus service runs to Springfield, just over 30 kilometres (19 mi) from Castle Hill Village. There are no public facilities other than a public toilet at the village hall and a children's playground.

Selwyn District has set separate design rules in its district plan for buildings in Castle Hill Village so that the alpine character of the location is reflected. In 2020, a resource consent allowing up to 111 new plots was granted.

Mountain biking is popular around Castle Hill Village with the Hogsback track connecting Castle Hill Village with Texas Flat on the Mount Cheeseman Ski Field Road. The majority of the track construction was carried out in a series of community work parties over the 2010/2011 summer.

Castle Hill Village's proximity to the Porters Ski Resort, Mount Cheeseman, Broken River and Craigieburn Ski Fields makes it popular with Christchurch residents during the winter.

== Climate ==
Climate data for Castle Hill Village (averages 2006–2020, records 2006–present), 726m
Month	Jan	Feb	Mar	Apr	May	Jun	Jul	Aug	Sep	Oct	Nov	Dec	Year
Record high °C (°F)	33.6 (92.5)	32.8 (91.0)	30.1 (86.2)	23.7 (74.7)	20.7 (69.3)	16.8 (62.2)	15.6 (60.1)	19.3 (66.7)	21.5 (70.7)	26.5 (79.7)	29.7 (85.5)	29.9 (85.8)	33.6 (92.5)
Mean maximum °C (°F)	29.6 (85.3)	29.2 (84.6)	26.0 (78.8)	21.8 (71.2)	17.7 (63.9)	14.6 (58.3)	13.3 (55.9)	15.3 (59.5)	19.3 (66.7)	22.6 (72.7)	25.8 (78.4)	27.6 (81.7)	31.1 (88.0)
Mean daily maximum °C (°F)	22.2 (72.0)	22.0 (71.6)	19.4 (66.9)	15.1 (59.2)	11.6 (52.9)	8.1 (46.6)	7.8 (46.0)	9.9 (49.8)	12.8 (55.0)	15.1 (59.2)	17.8 (64.0)	20.0 (68.0)	15.2 (59.4)
Daily mean °C (°F)	14.7 (58.5)	14.2 (57.6)	11.9 (53.4)	8.4 (47.1)	5.5 (41.9)	2.4 (36.3)	2.1 (35.8)	3.7 (38.7)	6.1 (43.0)	8.1 (46.6)	10.6 (51.1)	12.8 (55.0)	8.4 (47.1)
Mean daily minimum °C (°F)	7.8 (46.0)	7.4 (45.3)	5.7 (42.3)	3.1 (37.6)	0.9 (33.6)	−1.8 (28.8)	−2.2 (28.0)	−1.1 (30.0)	0.4 (32.7)	1.9 (35.4)	4.1 (39.4)	6.5 (43.7)	2.7 (36.9)
Mean minimum °C (°F)	1.8 (35.2)	1.6 (34.9)	−0.7 (30.7)	−2.8 (27.0)	−5.0 (23.0)	−7.4 (18.7)	−7.8 (18.0)	−7.0 (19.4)	−5.5 (22.1)	−3.2 (26.2)	−2.0 (28.4)	0.7 (33.3)	−9.0 (15.8)
Record low °C (°F)	−1.4 (29.5)	−1.2 (29.8)	−2.9 (26.8)	−5.1 (22.8)	−6.8 (19.8)	−11.0 (12.2)	−10.6 (12.9)	−9.8 (14.4)	−6.9 (19.6)	−5.9 (21.4)	−3.9 (25.0)	−1.7 (28.9)	−11.0 (12.2)
Average rainfall mm (inches)	57.3 (2.26)	56.7 (2.23)	41.5 (1.63)	67.3 (2.65)	75.8 (2.98)	67.5 (2.66)	77.1 (3.04)	71.8 (2.83)	71.7 (2.82)	94.8 (3.73)	75.2 (2.96)	72.4 (2.85)	829.1 (32.64)
Source: Weather Summary Reports – Castle Hill Village
