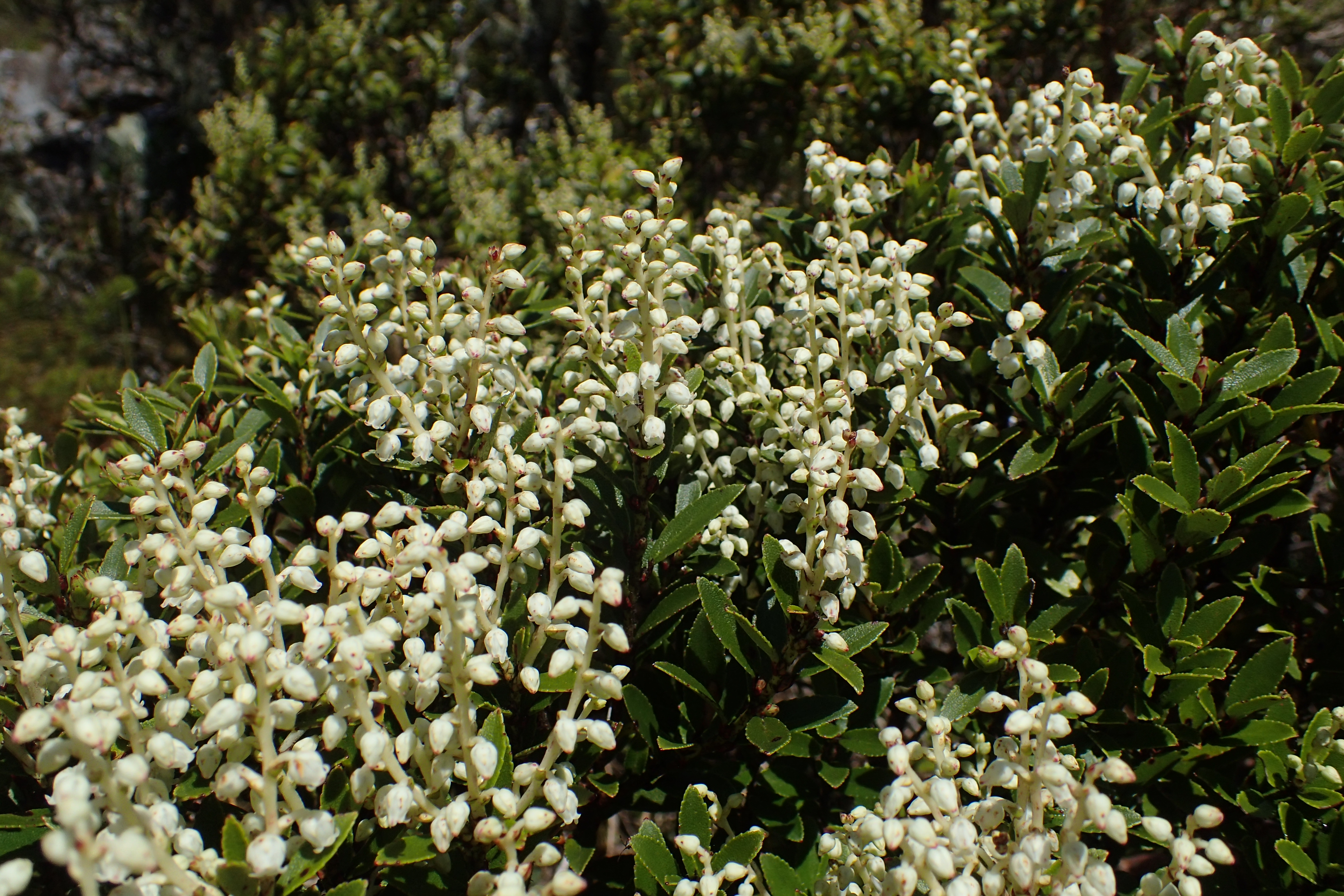
- Near the Otira Viaduct

Scientific classification
- Kingdom: Plantae
- Clade: Embryophytes
- Clade: Tracheophytes
- Clade: Spermatophytes
- Clade: Angiosperms
- Clade: Eudicots
- Clade: Asterids
- Order: Ericales
- Family: Ericaceae
- Genus: Gaultheria
- Species: G. rupestris

Binomial name
- Gaultheria rupestris (L.f.) D.Don

= Gaultheria rupestris =

Species of shrub in New Zealand

Gaultheria rupestris is a shrub in the family Ericaceae. This species is endemic to New Zealand.

== Description ==
This species can grow up to 1.5 metres (4 feet 11 inches) tall and has branches that are either erect or spreading. Adult leaves are coloured brownish to dark green. G. rupestris produces clusters of white flowers.
