= Paramyro apicus =

Conservation status
- Data Deficit (NZ TCS)

Scientific classification
- Kingdom: Animalia
- Phylum: Arthropoda
- Subphylum: Chelicerata
- Class: Arachnida
- Order: Araneae
- Infraorder: Araneomorphae
- Family: Agelenidae
- Genus: Paramyro
- Species: P. apicus

Binomial name
- Paramyro apicus Forster & Wilton, 1973

Species of spider

Paramyro apicus is a species of Agelenidae that is endemic to New Zealand.

== Taxonomy ==
This species was described in 1973 by Ray Forster and Cecil Wilton from a female specimens. The holotype is stored in Otago Museum.

== Description ==
The female is recorded at 5.48mm in length. The carapace is coloured orange brown with dark shading. The legs are orange brown. The abdomen is shaded blackish brown in some sections.

== Distribution ==
This species is only known from Fiordland, New Zealand.

== Conservation status ==
Under the New Zealand Threat Classification System, this species is listed as "Data Deficient" with the qualifiers of "Data Poor: Size", "Data Poor: Trend" and "One Location".
