= Paramyro =

Scientific classification
- Kingdom: Animalia
- Phylum: Arthropoda
- Subphylum: Chelicerata
- Class: Arachnida
- Order: Araneae
- Infraorder: Araneomorphae
- Family: Agelenidae
- Genus: Paramyro; Forster & Wilton, 1973

Type species
- P. apicus Forster & Wilton, 1973

Species
- P. apicus Forster & Wilton, 1973 – New Zealand; P. parapicus Forster & Wilton, 1973 – New Zealand

Genus of spiders

Paramyro is a genus of funnel weavers first described by Raymond Robert Forster & C. L. Wilton in 1973. As of October 2026 it contains only two species, both endemic to New Zealand.
