= Porters Pass =

Mountain pass in the Canterbury region of New Zealand

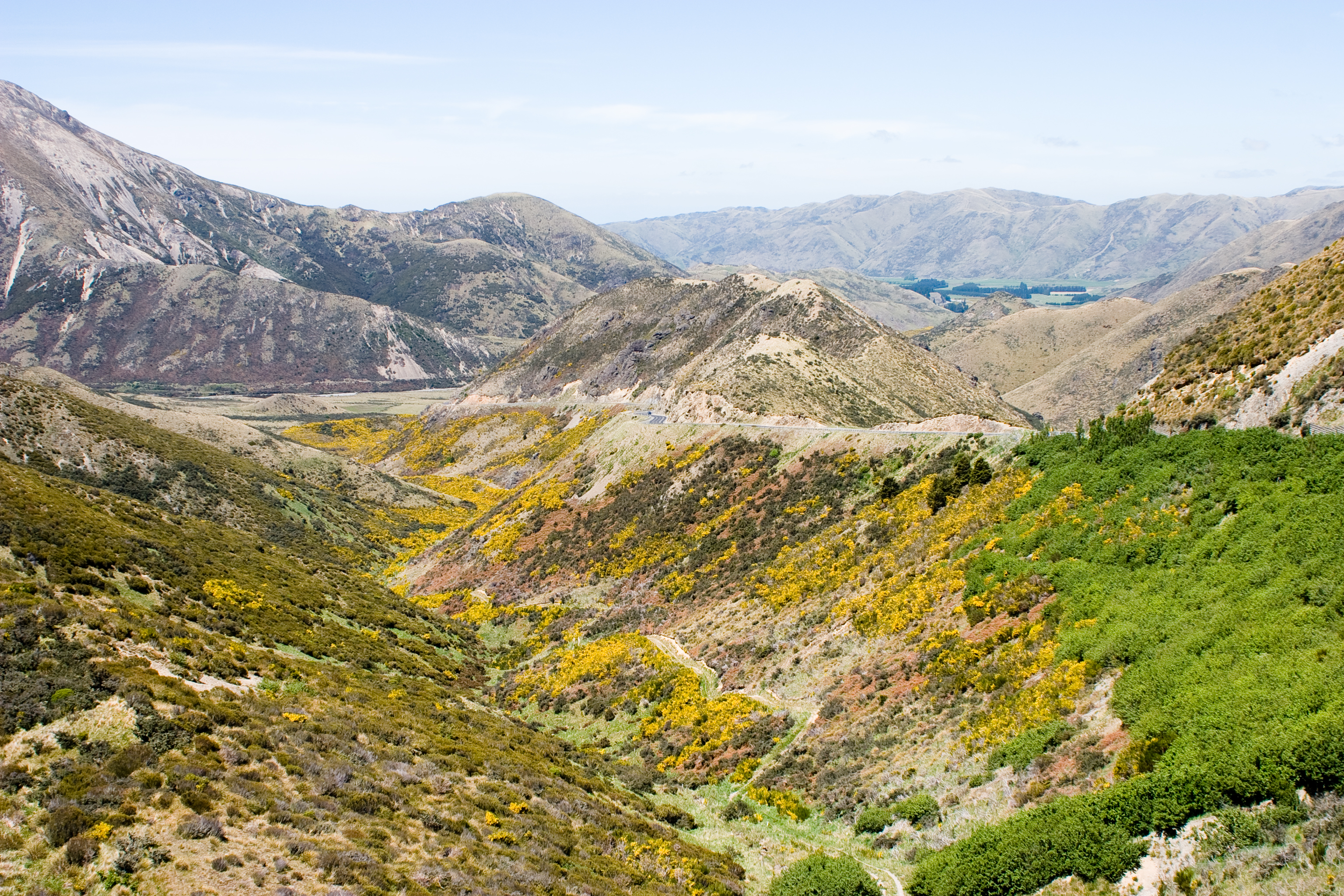
- State Highway 73 descending from Porters Pass towards Springfield.
- Interactive map of Porters Pass
- Elevation: 939 metres (3,081 ft)
- Traversed by: State Highway 73

Third Approach
- Location: New Zealand
- Range: Southern Alps
- Coordinates: 43°17′48″S 171°44′31″E

Porters Pass (elevation 939 metres) is a mountain pass in the Canterbury region of New Zealand's South Island.

It is near Lake Lyndon and is located within Korowai/Torlesse Tussocklands Park. State Highway 73 travels through the pass on its route from Springfield to Cass, and it is the last mountain pass on the route eastwards from Westland to Christchurch. It is also the third-highest point on the South Island's state highway network, after the Lindis Pass and the Milford Road (though it is just one metre lower). Although Arthur's Pass is better known, Porters Pass is a few metres higher, and it affords views of the Canterbury Plains. The Porter brothers, who were farming nearby, named the pass in 1858.

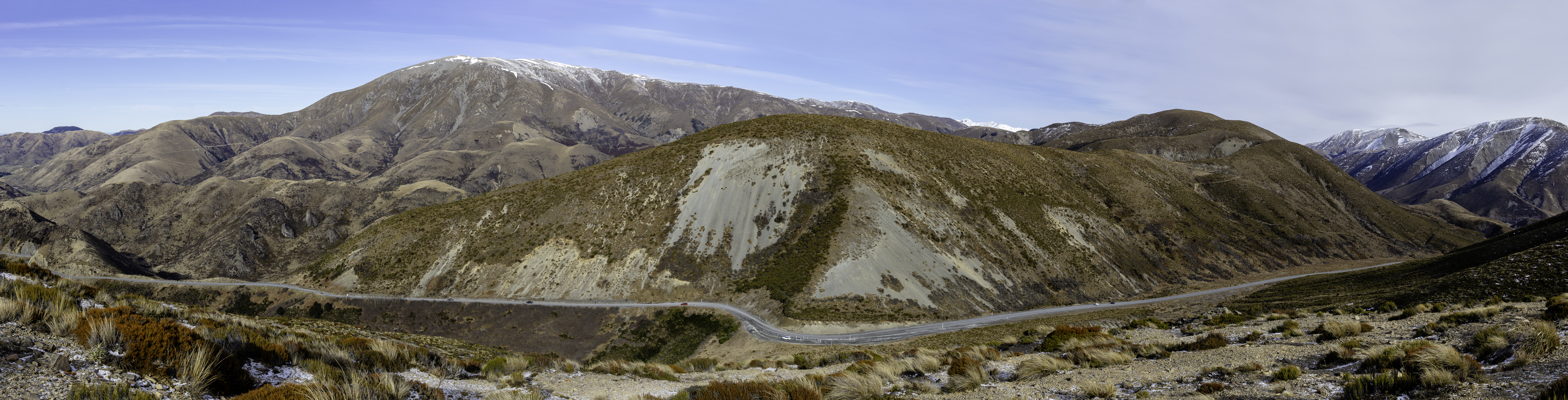
Panorama of Porters Pass with Porters Pass carpark in the middle
