= Blue Spur, West Coast =

Blue Spur
- Interactive map of Blue Spur
- Coordinates: 42°43′00″S 171°03′50″E
- Country: New Zealand
- Region: West Coast
- District: Westland District
- Electorates: West Coast-Tasman; Te Tai Tonga

Area
  - Total: 7.46 km^{2} (2.88 sq mi)

Population (2023 census)
  - Total: 252
  - Density: 33.8/km^{2} (87.5/sq mi)
- Time zone: UTC+12 (NZST)
  - Summer (DST): UTC+13 (NZDT)
- Postcode: 7882
- Area code: 03
- Local iwi: Ngāi Tahu

Blue Spur is a locality inland from Hokitika in the Westland District of New Zealand.

== Description ==
Blue Spur stretches from the Tasman Sea in the west about 12 km (7.5 mi) eastwards towards the area of Humphreys and the Blue Spur Range. It can be accessed by road along the "Blue Spur Tourist Drive" from the centre of Hokitika. During the late 1860s, the time of the West Coast gold rush, "The Spur" (as the locals always called it) was inhabited by more than 2,500 people. There was a school, several hotels, busy bars and a theatre. Since around the year 2000 the area is gradually being rediscovered and repopulated as it offers rural living close to town.

== Name ==
The etymology of the term "blue spur" not well known. The gold diggers of the 1860s gold rush went after the gold "on the spur (of the moment)", i.e. in a great hurry/rush. Alluvial gold may often be found close to a layer of blueish clay. Miners frequently talk about mining down to the "blue clay", thus a "blue spur" could somehow elucidate the hasty process of digging for the gold pursuing a blueish layer of clay. Other potential meanings could refer to a blueish colour of mountains ("blue mountains") as it can be spotted in certain light at distant mountains at this location, combined with the geological meaning of a spur, i.e., a secondary mountain ridge. Besides these gold rush-related connotations there is a "blue spur flower" (Plectranthus ciliatus), and the "blue spur" in coats of arms.

== Demographics ==
Blue Spur covers 7.46 km^{2} (2.88 sq mi). It is part of the Hokitika urban area.

Historical population
Year	Pop.	±% p.a.
2006	186	—
2013	150	−3.03%
2018	150	+0.00%
2023	252	+10.93%
The 2006 population is for a larger area of 7.87 km^{2}. Source:

Blue Spur had a population of 252 in the 2023 New Zealand census, an increase of 102 people (68.0%) since the 2018 census, and an increase of 102 people (68.0%) since the 2013 census. There were 126 males and 129 females in 105 dwellings. 3.6% of people identified as LGBTIQ+. The median age was 48.4 years (compared with 38.1 years nationally). There were 39 people (15.5%) aged under 15 years, 33 (13.1%) aged 15 to 29, 120 (47.6%) aged 30 to 64, and 60 (23.8%) aged 65 or older.

People could identify as more than one ethnicity. The results were 91.7% European (Pākehā), 15.5% Māori, 1.2% Pasifika, 4.8% Asian, and 2.4% other, which includes people giving their ethnicity as "New Zealander". English was spoken by 98.8%, Māori by 2.4%, and other languages by 7.1%. No language could be spoken by 2.4% (e.g. too young to talk). New Zealand Sign Language was known by 1.2%. The percentage of people born overseas was 15.5, compared with 28.8% nationally.

Religious affiliations were 28.6% Christian, 1.2% Hindu, and 1.2% New Age. People who answered that they had no religion were 60.7%, and 7.1% of people did not answer the census question.

Of those at least 15 years old, 42 (19.7%) people had a bachelor's or higher degree, 138 (64.8%) had a post-high school certificate or diploma, and 27 (12.7%) people exclusively held high school qualifications. The median income was $43,400, compared with $41,500 nationally. 33 people (15.5%) earned over $100,000 compared to 12.1% nationally. The employment status of those at least 15 was 105 (49.3%) full-time, 36 (16.9%) part-time, and 3 (1.4%) unemployed.
