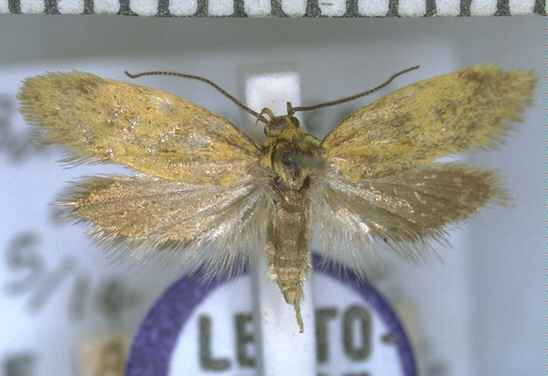
- Male lectotype

Scientific classification
- Kingdom: Animalia
- Phylum: Arthropoda
- Class: Insecta
- Order: Lepidoptera
- Family: Oecophoridae
- Genus: Tingena
- Species: T. aphrontis

Binomial name
- Tingena aphrontis (Meyrick, 1883)

Synonyms
- Cremnogenes aphrontis Meyrick, 1883; Borkhausenia aphrontis (Meyrick, 1883)

= Tingena aphrontis =

Species of moth, endemic to New Zealand

Tingena aphrontis is a species of moth in the family Oecophoridae. It is endemic to New Zealand and has been collected at altitudes between 3000 – 5000 ft at Arthur's Pass and Mount Arthur. The species lives in open alpine habitat amongst alpine vegetation. Adults of the species are on the wing in January.

== Taxonomy ==
This species was described by Edward Meyrick in 1883 using specimens collected at Arthur's Pass at 5000 ft in January and named Cremnogenes aphrontis. Meyrick gave a more detailed description under this name in 1884. In 1915 Meyrick placed this species within the Borkhausenia genus. George Hudson illustrated and discussed this species under the name B. aphrontis in his 1928 publication The butterflies and moths of New Zealand. In 1988 J. S. Dugdale placed this species in the genus Tingena. The male lectotype, collected at Arthur's Pass, is held at the Natural History Museum, London.

== Description ==
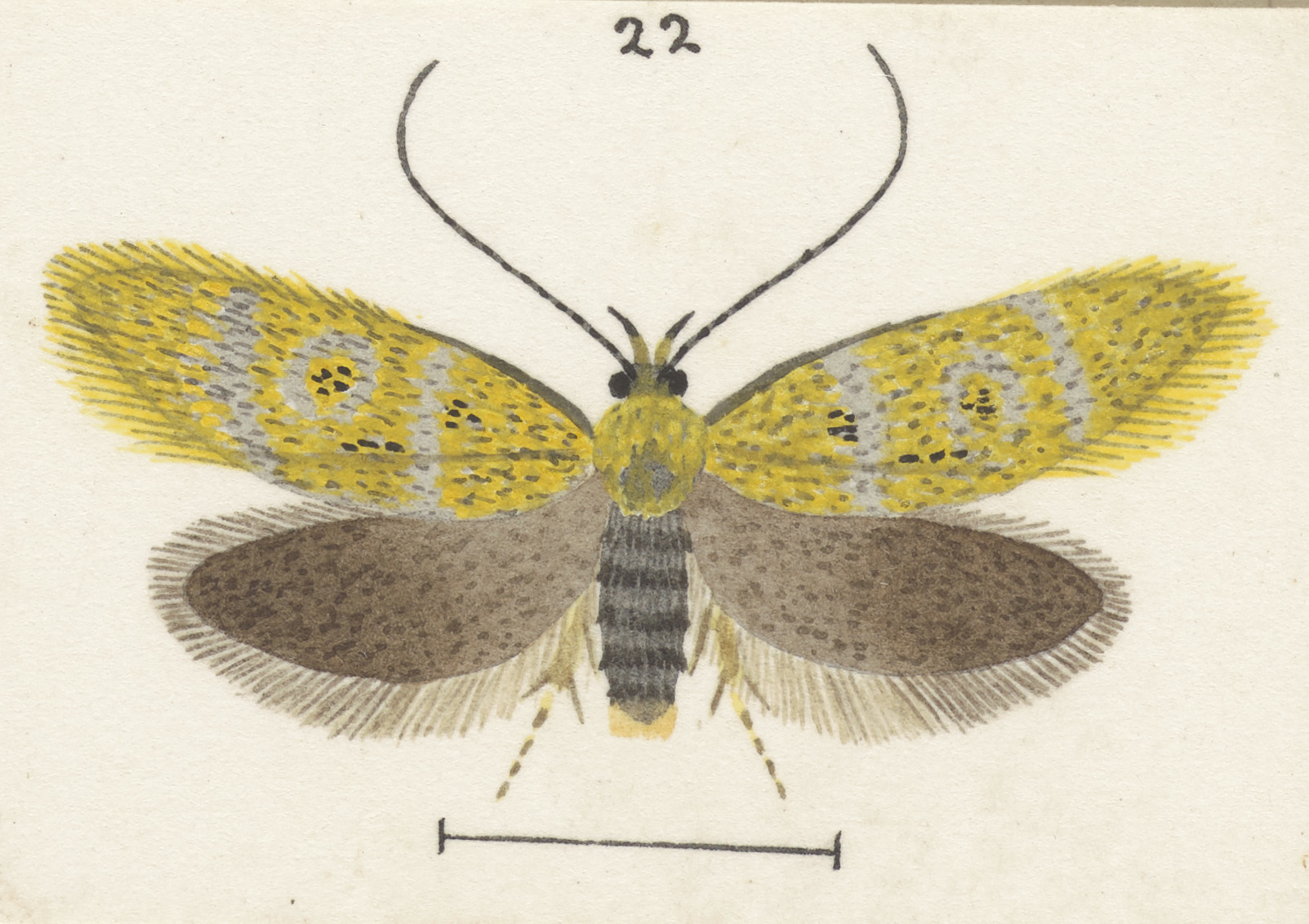
Illustration of T. aphrontis by George Hudson.

Meyrick first described this species as follows:

Fore wings ochreous-yellow, partially suffused with grey, with a black discal dot; hind wings dark grey, paler towards base.

In 1884 Meyrick went into more detail, describing this species as follows:

Male, female. — 12-14 1/2 mm. Head and palpi ochreous-yellow, anterior edge of palpi suffusedly dark fuscous. Antennae blackish. Thorax dark fuscous, with yellowish lateral and posterior spots. Abdomen dark grey, posteriorly becoming whitish-ochreous. Legs dark grey, apex of joints obscurely ochreous-whitish, posterior tibiae with very dense ochreous-whitish hairs. Forewings moderate, costa moderately arched, apex round-pointed, hindmargin very obliquely rounded; grey, more or less wholly suffused irregularly with ochreous yellow; a blackish dot in disc beyond middle : cilia pale ochreous-yellow, somewhat mixed with grey. Hindwings grey, darker towards apex : cilia ochreous-whitish, suffused with dark grey towards base.

This species is variable as the grey coloured patches are sometimes absent in some specimens.

== Distribution ==
It is endemic to New Zealand and has been collected at Mount Arthur and at Arthur's pass at altitudes of between 3000 – 5000 ft.

== Behaviour ==
This species is on the wing in January.

== Habitat ==
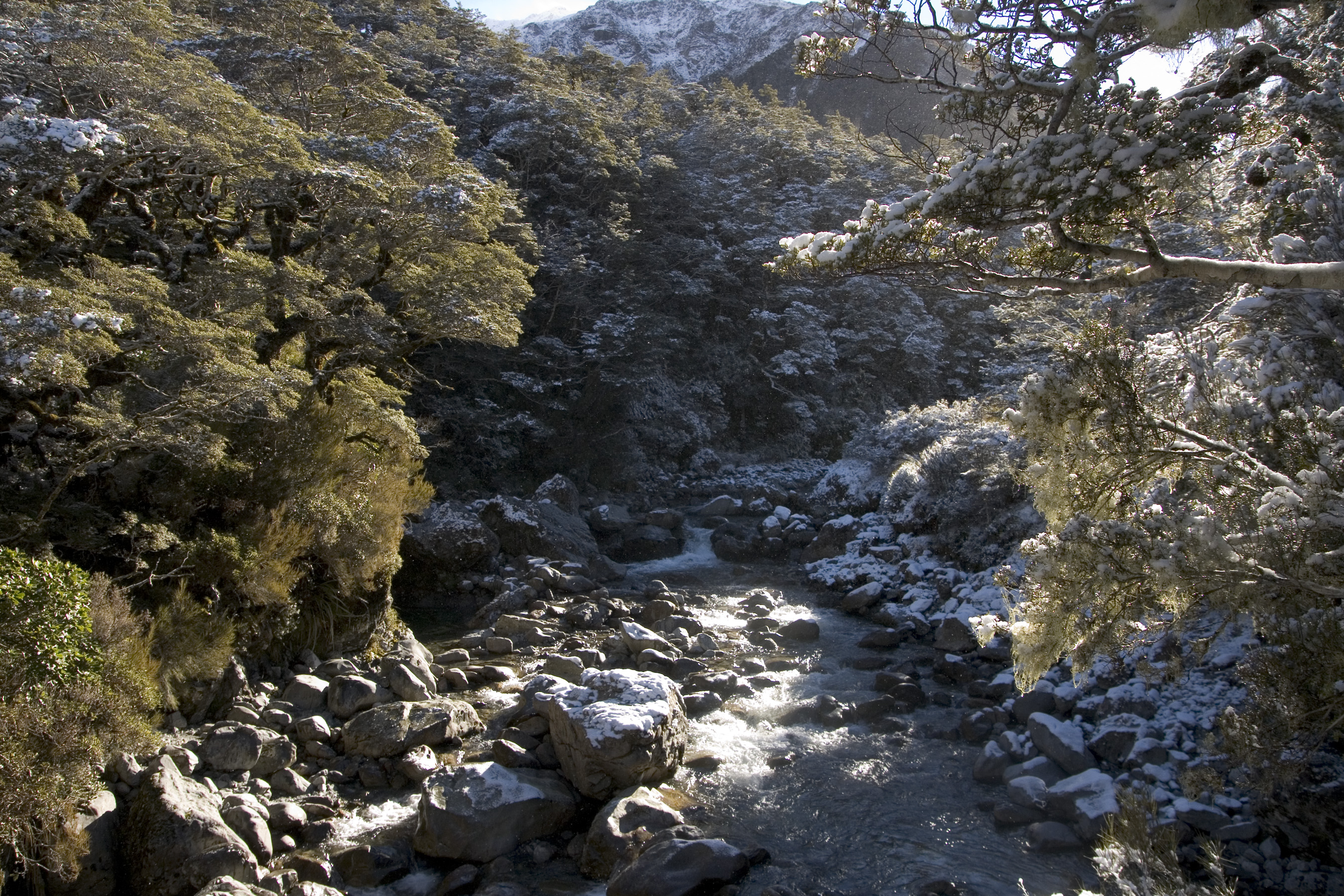
Habitat near Arthur's Pass

This species lives in open alpine habitat amongst alpine vegetation such as grass and herbs.
