= Craigieburn Valley Ski Area =

Ski area in New Zealand

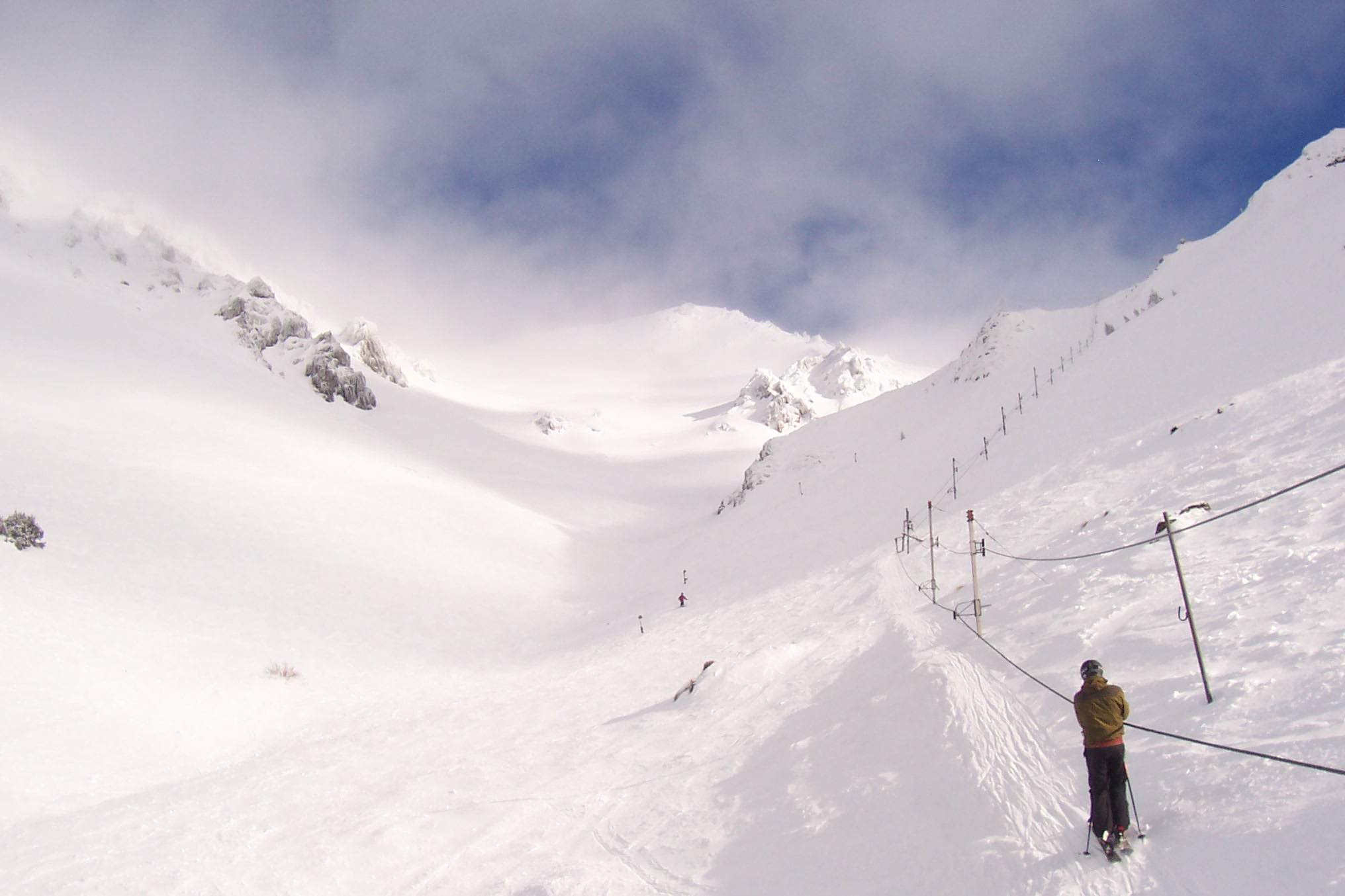
- Looking up the valley
- Interactive map of Craigieburn Valley Ski Area
- Location: Canterbury NZ
- Nearest city: Springfield
- Coordinates: 43.1188°S 171.6971°E
- Top elevation: 1922 m
- Base elevation: 1308 m
- Skiable area: 160 ha (400 acres)
- Trails: Backcountry
- Lift system: 3 Rope tow
- Terrain parks: 0
- Snowmaking: no
- Night skiing: On a full moon
- Website: http://www.craigieburn.co.nz

Craigieburn Valley Ski Area is a club skifield in the Southern Alps of New Zealand's South Island, about 104 km west from Christchurch. Catering only to intermediate and advanced skiers, it features a vertical range of 1308–1811 m, 160 ha (400 acres) of skiable area and 3 fast rope tows, the first installed in 1949. In 1954 a project was attempted to install a T-Bar lift, with components airdropped from an RNZAF Bristol Freighter, but the tow suffered from engineering problems after only one season. The resort has several ski lodges but no gear hire. It is also the base for ski touring expeditions when conditions permit. It is immediately adjacent to the Broken River Ski Area, with which it shares a ski pass system. Skiing between the two is possible with backcountry ski touring involved .

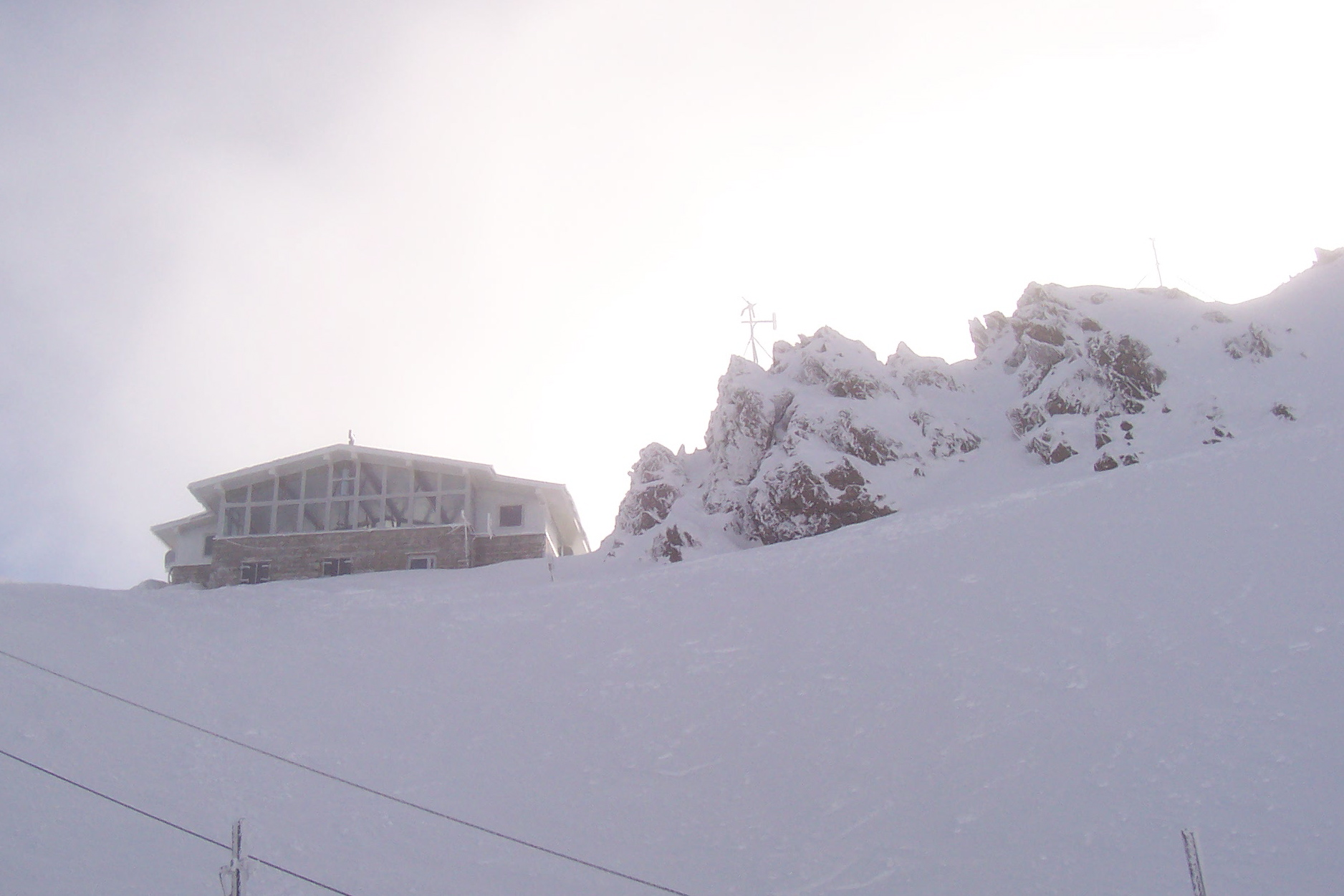
The Whakamaru Day Lodge

Craigieburn has two accommodation lodges, the main Koroheke lodge which has 6-bed dorm rooms and Matuhi which has private rooms. Through the winter there are many ski and accommodation package options as well as a ski week system, where people come and stay for a Sunday to Saturday week. Duties are shared between staff and guests and, while there is a cook and a manager, light duties are normally done by guests. This is the nature of most club fields in New Zealand. There is also a bar in Koroheke lodge, the normal meeting place after a day on the field. The services available during the day are at the day lodge located near the top of the mountain. There you can find hot food options and fresh coffee, and it is a warm spot to stop off with a great view of the ski area.

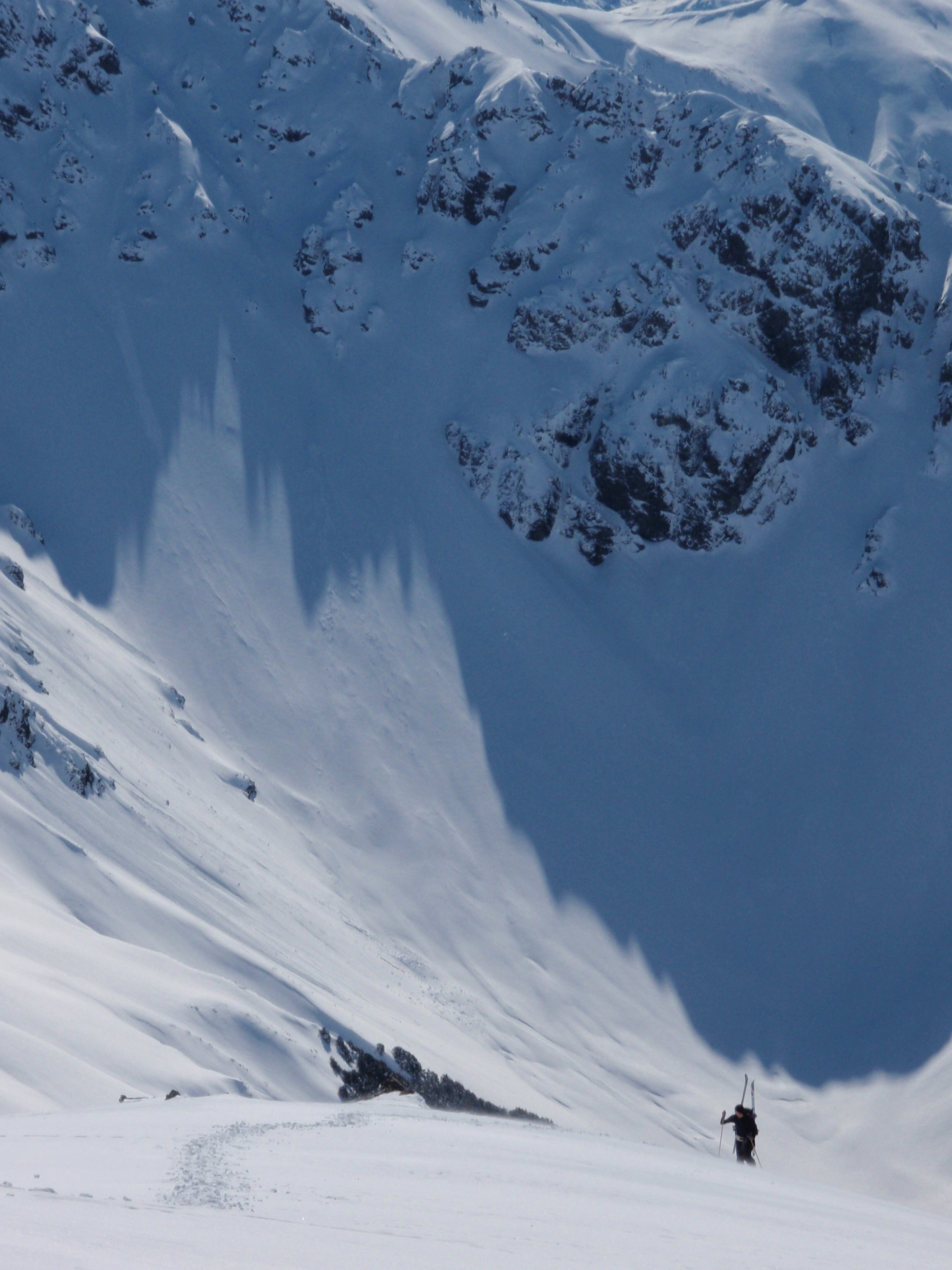
On the way to Hamilton Peak from Craigieburn Valley

Craigieburn is internationally famous for its steep terrain, 45% rated as advanced. There is no grooming and the hiking and ski touring options are excellent, including Middle Basin, a 600 m open bowl back to the access road. Hamilton Peak is a popular spot, giving the skier access to the upper Hamilton face. The trip to the Broken River ski field lift system can be accomplished from Hamilton Peak without any further ascent. However you are entering uncontrolled avalanche terrain and should bring proper equipment and the knowledge to use it. There are also many back-country and touring options past Middle Basin into North Middle, True North basins and Mt Manson.
