= Otira Viaduct =

- Otira Viaduct looking north, 2026
- Coordinates: 42°53′10″S 171°33′19″E
- Carries: State Highway 73 (Otira highway)
- Crosses: Ōtira River
- Locale: Otira
- Maintained by: New Zealand Transport Agency
- Followed by: Wallace Point Bridge

Location
- Interactive map of Otira Viaduct

The Otira Viaduct is a large road bridge to the south of Otira, between Otira and the Arthur's Pass summit. Completed in 1999, the 440 metres (1,440 ft) four-span viaduct carries State Highway 73 over a stretch of unstable land, replacing a narrow, winding, dangerous section of road that was prone to avalanches, slips and closures.

== Description ==
The Otira Viaduct is a four span cantilever bridge with a length of 440 metres (1,440 ft) and average grade of 12% on its deck. Each pier is about 40 metres (130 ft) high, supported on excavated cylinders which are 4 metres (13 ft) in diameter and 25 metres (82 ft) deep.

== History ==
=== Old coach road ===
Aerial image of Otira Gorge, showing the viaduct on the left and the remains of the old zig-zag road on the right

Construction of the Ōtira Gorge and Arthur's Pass road began in the winter of 1865 and, until completion of the Viaduct, was a dangerous section of highway. From the summit of Arthur's Pass to Otira, the highway descends 495 metres (1,624 ft) in the short distance between them. The pass was constructed in 10 months and the original coach road was opened in March 1866. The construction was completed during a harsh winter for the pass, which receives an annual average rainfall of between 4,000 millimetres (160 in) and 7,000 millimetres (280 in), in addition to regular snow and minimum temperatures well below zero. Throughout the construction, many workers were drowned in flooding rivers. This included six workers drowning in the same week.

The former coach road included 11 bridges with a total length of 406.6 metres (1,334 ft) and five 360 degree bends through a dangerous zig-zag section. Construction was carried out by contractors J. Smith and E.G. Wright using labourers with picks, shovels, wheelbarrows and two-horse drays. The road was constructed and designed under the authority of the Canterbury Provincial Council by engineers Edward Dobson, George Thornton, and Walter & Edwin Blake.

=== Replacement needed ===
The original road suffered from unstable geology. The road was essentially built along the top of a scree slope, and so erosion constantly threatened to undermine the road. The road first had to be realigned in 1929 after an earthquake collapsed the road down the side of the gorge. By 1943 erosion had forced the road to be realigned again. Over time, the road was moved further and further up the side of the gorge to where the ground was more stable. This made the already-steep zig-zag even higher. By 1993 it was deemed no longer feasible to continue maintaining the existing road, and Transit NZ began looking for replacement solutions.

Options considered including moving the road to a new cutting on the opposite side of the gorge, or realigning the road to run alongside the river at the bottom of the gorge. After consultation with international engineers, a single four-span bridge design was selected as the lowest cost way to solve all the design requirements. The path of the bridge was gently curved to complement the surrounding landscape, which is a protected National Park.

=== Construction ===
Construction of the viaduct was technically very challenging. The geology of the area includes loose rock, strong artesian pressure and ground water movements, which made it difficult to choose a stable way of anchoring the bridge footings to the ground. Drilling revealed that unstable rockfall made up the majority of the valley floor to a depth of more than 12 metres.

The project was tendered to McConnell Smith Pty Ltd; a consortium of local contractors, with engineering and design work done by Beca. In order to create the foundations for the piers, specialised "Numa" down-the-hole hammers were purchased, which percussively dug out 762 millimetres (30.0 in)–diameter piles, which were filled with concrete. Drilling averaged 6 metres (20 ft) per hour, but sometimes exceeded 15 metres (49 ft) per hour. A 4 metres (13 ft) ring of these smaller piles was carved out in this way, and the interior was then excavated. Permanent steel casings were then lowered in to the hole and filled with concrete, to form the structural 4 metres (13 ft)–diameter pier foundations. The cylinders were dug down to depths of 25 metres (82 ft). The piers were constructed atop the foundations using box forms.

Trucking the concrete into the site required navigating the precarious old Zig-Zag road from Otira. The decking of the bridge was constructed using a cantilever approach.

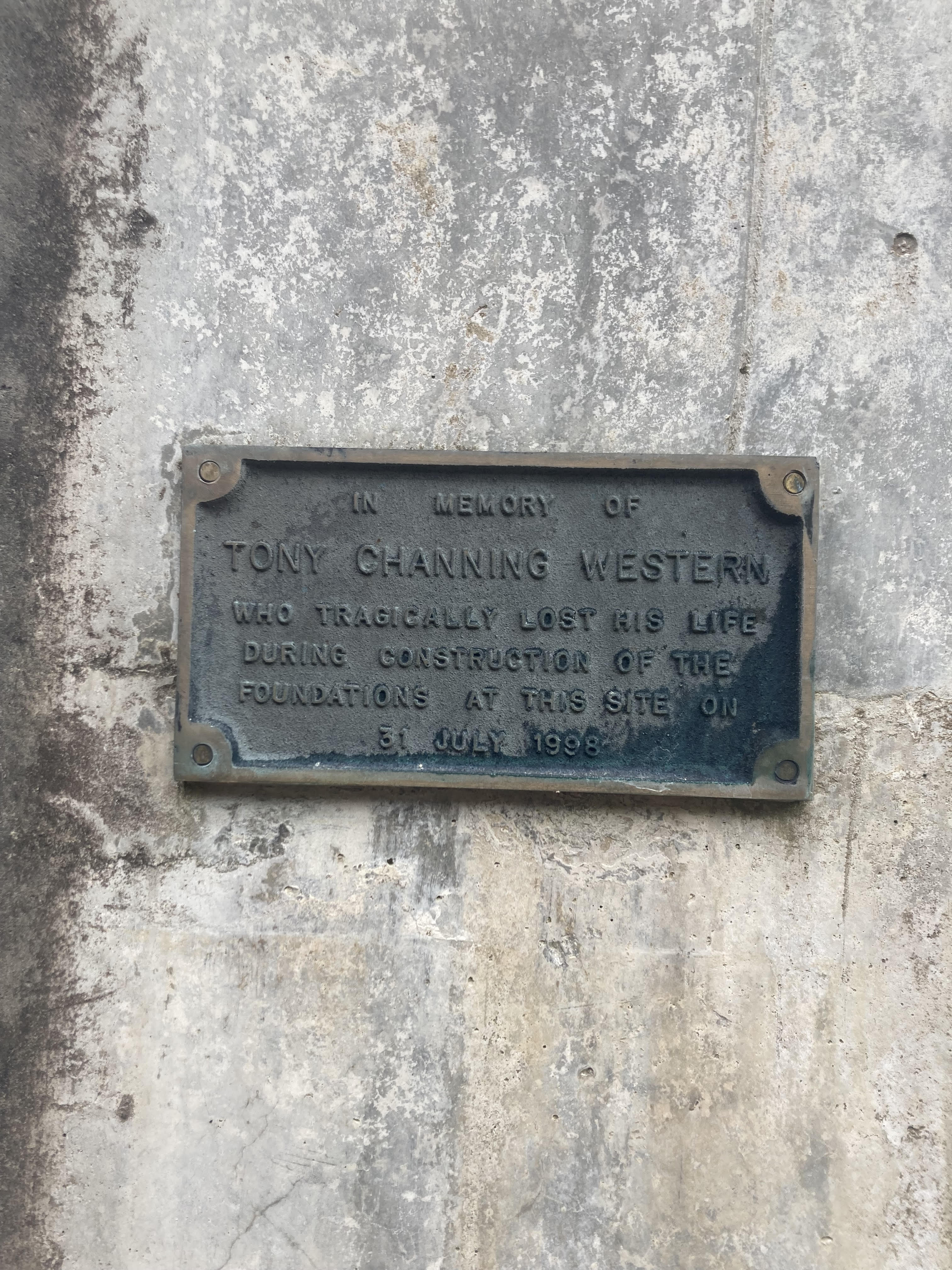
Tony Western Memorial Plaque on Otira Viaduct

One person, Tony Western, 25, was killed during construction in July 1998 when a chain failed and a pump fell on him. A plaque was installed in his memory in the base of the westernmost pier.

== Sources ==
- Billings, Ian (May 2004), "Design and Construction of the Otira Viaduct" (PDF), Fifth Austroads Bridge Conference, Austroads, archived from the original (PDF) on 17 September 2026
- Ramsay, Graham (2022), Engineering in Changing Times, Wellington: Writes Hill Press, ISBN 978-1-99-117100-9
