= Otira =

Town in the West Coast Region of New Zealand

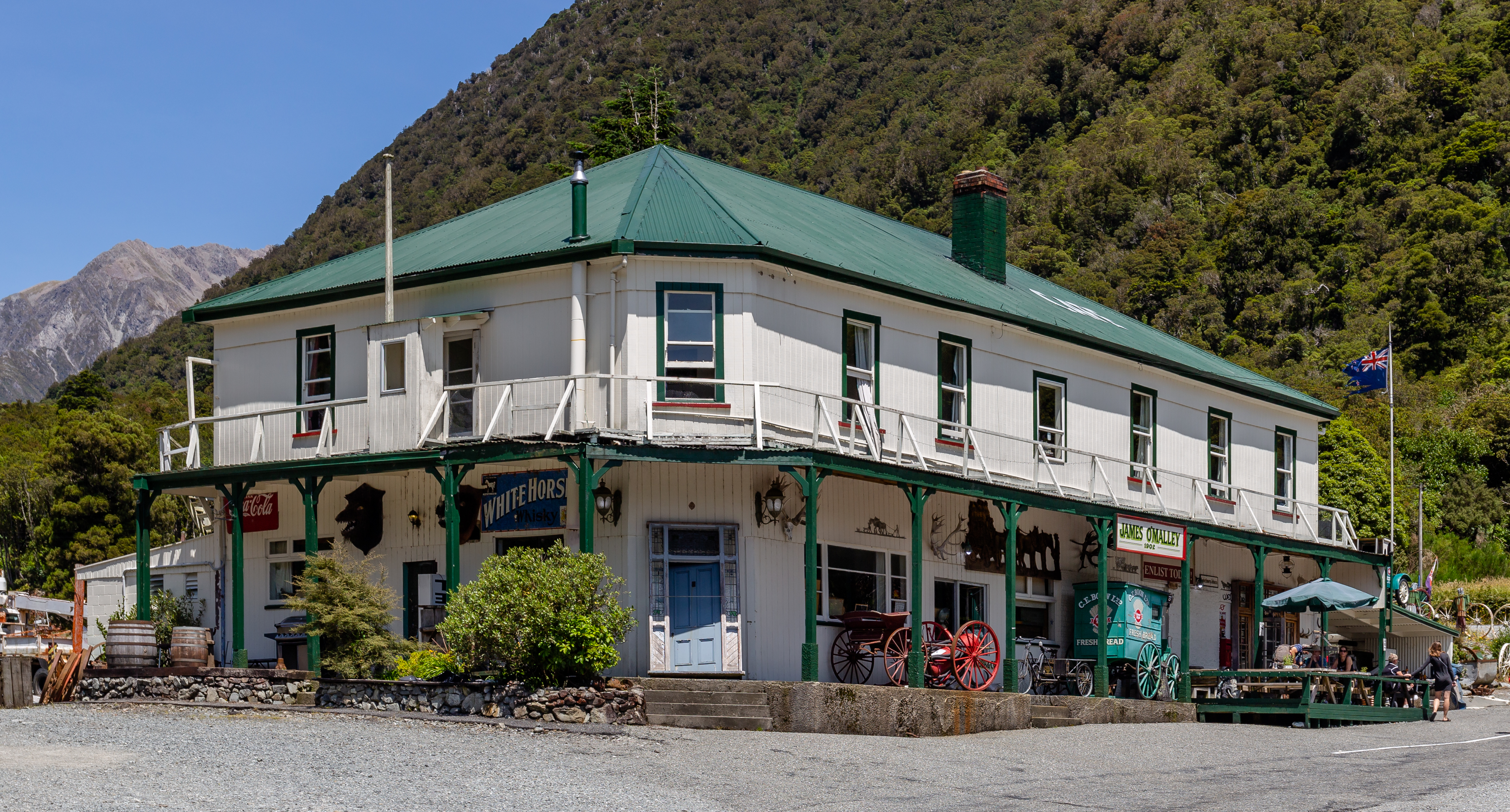
- Otira Stagecoach Hotel
- Interactive map of Otira
- Coordinates: 42.8311°S 171.5608°E
- Country: New Zealand
- Region: West Coast
- District: Westland District
- Ward: Northern
- Electorates: West Coast-Tasman; Te Tai Tonga

Government
  - Territorial authority: Westland District Council
  - Regional council: West Coast Regional Council
  - Mayor of Westland: Helen Lash
  - West Coast-Tasman MP: Maureen Pugh
  - Te Tai Tonga MP: Tākuta Ferris
- Time zone: UTC+12 (NZST)
  - Summer (DST): UTC+13 (NZDT)
- Postcode: 7875
- Area code: 03
- Local iwi: Ngāi Tahu

Otira is a small township 15 kilometres (9.3 mi) north of Arthur's Pass in the central South Island of New Zealand. It is on the northern approach to the pass, a saddle between the Ōtira and Bealey Rivers high in the Southern Alps. A possible meaning of Otira is "o" (place of) and "tira" (the travellers). Another possible meaning is "Oti" (finished) and "ra" (Sun), because Otira Gorge is usually in deep shadow.

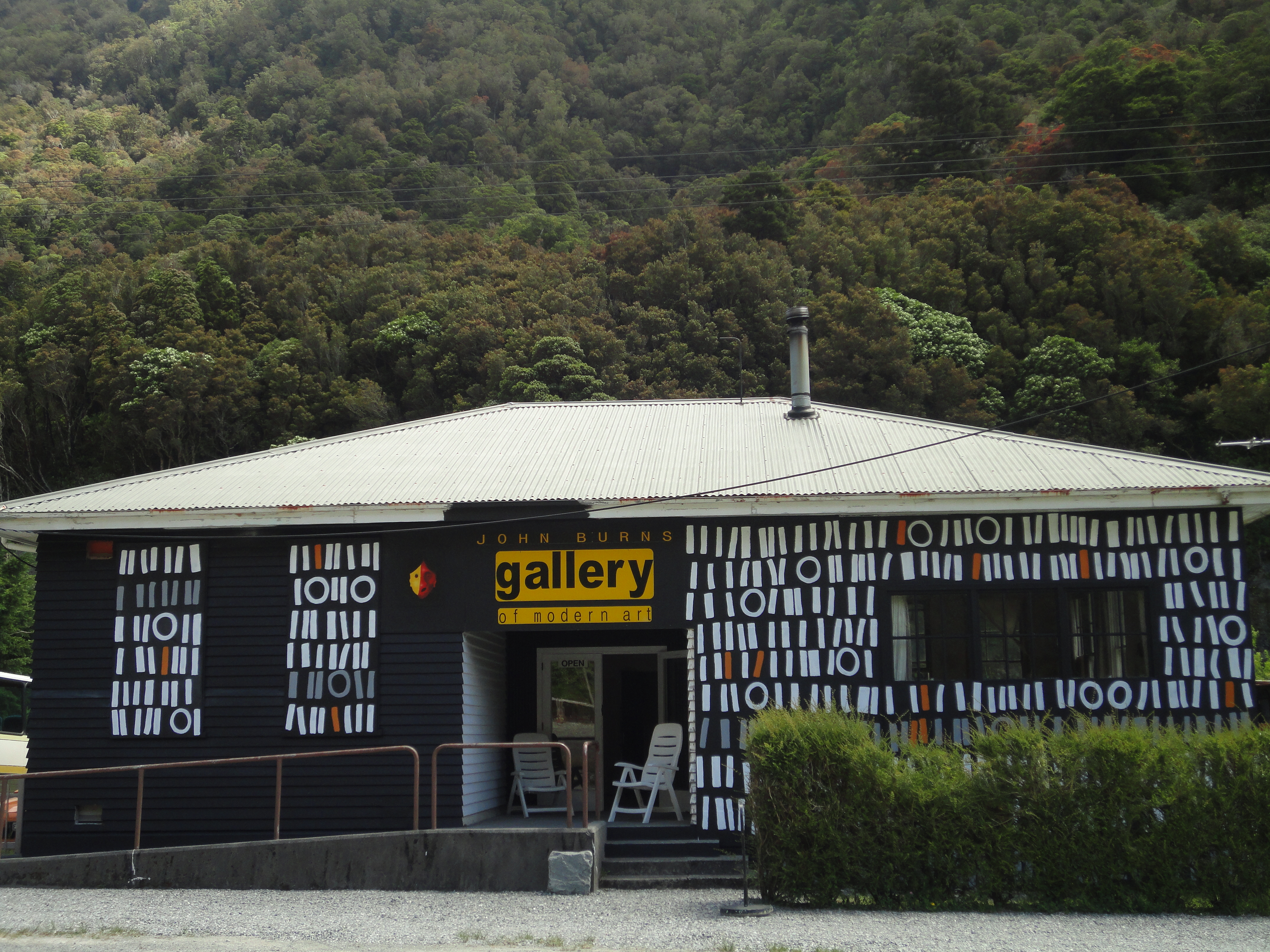
John Burns Gallery of Modern Art nestled in the Otira Gorge

== History ==
Otira was originally a stop on the Cobb and Co stagecoach from Canterbury to the West Coast. The Midland Line was extended from Stillwater to Jacksons in 1894 and then Otira in 1899, when the pass was navigated by coach from Otira until the railway tunnel opened in 1923. During the construction of the tunnel, Otira housed about 600 workers and their families.

The Otira Railway Station was opened on 13 November 1900 (ex-Goat Creek on 15 October 1900), and closed in February 1992.

In the 1950s, the town had a population of about 350, but this had dropped to 11 in 1988. As of 2025 the town has an estimated population of around 20 people.

While a small number of railway houses existed at the time the Otira Tunnel was being built, the vast majority were built in 1922 and 1923 as part of the Railways Department's Housing Scheme. They were needed to house staff required for the greatly-upscaled railway operation following the completion of the tunnel. Love Brothers from Port Chalmers had the contract to build 43 houses in the new village. A further house was built in 1951 at the bottom end of the village road. This survives today, along with 16 others from the former railway village.

The New Zealand Railways Corporation sold the village houses to Glenstone Holdings around the end of 1990, with a peppercorn lease on the land. In 1998, the remaining 18 ex-railway houses (one has since burnt down) were sold to Chris and Bill Hennah, along with the large two-storeyed hotel, community hall and fire station. The 20-odd hectares of leased land included the school grounds. The Hennahs bought the old school building itself, and nearby indoors swimming pool in 2002.

Love Brothers also built the railway hostel for refreshment rooms staff, along with the refreshment rooms which were situated at the north end of the railway station. The 'Refresh', as it was known, closed in November 1987 with the commencement of the TranzAlpine service between Christchurch and Greymouth.

Having paid $73,000 in 1998, the Hennahs put the village on the market in 2010 with an asking price of NZ$1.5 million. No bids were received but it remained on the market. When advertised again in 2013 the sale price had dropped to NZ$1 million, and it sold the following year to Lester Rowntree for an undisclosed sum, although as at 2020 the Hennahs still own the ex-school building and swimming pool.

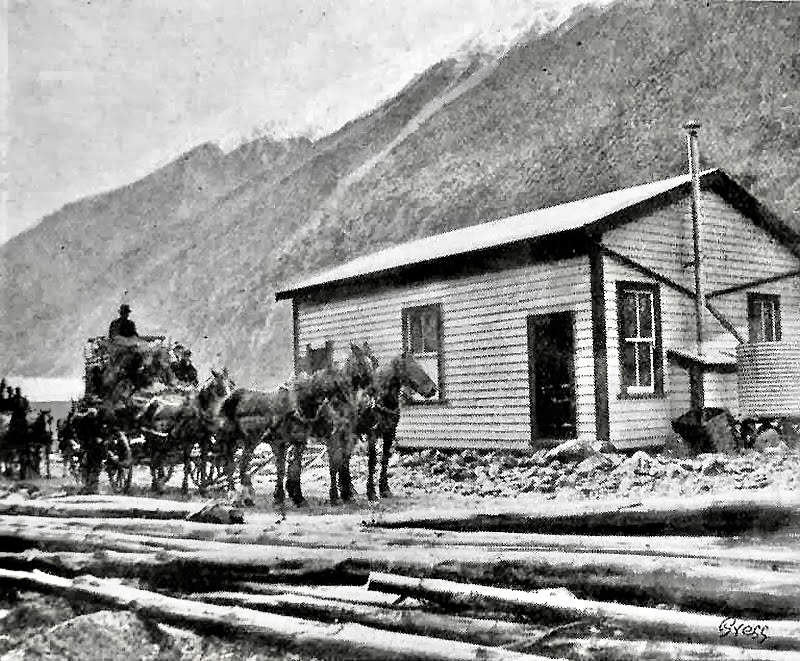
Otira post office in 1909

Not far away from the hotel (originally opened in 1902, but rebuilt following a fire in 1911) is the former post office which was built in 1952 to replace an earlier 1901 office, hit by lightning in 1942. It was 48 ft (15 m) x 42 ft (13 m) and provided for increased telephone traffic. It closed from 5 February 1988 when Postmaster-General, Richard Prebble, closed or reduced 580 offices. The first post office opened in 1875. The office has been refurbished into an art gallery known as the 'John Burns Gallery of Modern Art'. The complex exhibits art which is a surprise to many visitors, housed as it is in the middle of the Southern Alps. The former postmaster's house also survives.

Heading up the valley, there are a number of houses dotted along the highway. Rata Lodge Backpackers is situated near Goat Creek and provides alternative accommodation to the Otira Stagecoach Hotel.

When the tunnel opened in 1923, traction power for the Otira to Arthur's Pass electrified section was provided by a steam-driven generating station known as the 'Power House' — a large imposing building which included a big shed and repair workshop for the electric locomotives.

The steam generating plant closed in July 1941, with the source of power then coming from the newly-constructed transmission line from Lake Coleridge to the West Coast. This involved building a transformer substation at Otira, along with a rectifier substation at the tunnel mouth. Staffing required at the Otira substation meant four houses were built, two of which still survive. The old power house has been demolished.

Close to the town are two major feats of civil engineering: the Otira Tunnel, and the Otira Viaduct.

In 1888 a hot spring was discovered upstream from Otira. It was marked on the 1948 map.

== Demographics ==
Hokitika Valley-Otira statistical area, which also includes Kokatahi, covers 1,620.14 km^{2} (625.54 sq mi) and had an estimated population of 640 as of June 2025, with a population density of 0.40 people per km^{2}.

Historical population for Hokitika Valley-Otira
Year	Pop.	±% p.a.
2006	636	—
2013	612	−0.55%
2018	651	+1.24%
2023	630	−0.65%
The 2006 population is for a smaller area of 1,614.54 km^{2}. Source:

Hokitika Valley-Otira had a population of 630 in the 2023 New Zealand census, a decrease of 21 people (−3.2%) since the 2018 census, and an increase of 18 people (2.9%) since the 2013 census. There were 330 males and 297 females in 267 dwellings. 1.4% of people identified as LGBTIQ+. The median age was 43.1 years (compared with 38.1 years nationally). There were 126 people (20.0%) aged under 15 years, 84 (13.3%) aged 15 to 29, 318 (50.5%) aged 30 to 64, and 102 (16.2%) aged 65 or older.

People could identify as more than one ethnicity. The results were 89.5% European (Pākehā), 11.4% Māori, 1.0% Pasifika, 4.3% Asian, and 7.6% other, which includes people giving their ethnicity as "New Zealander". English was spoken by 98.1%, Māori by 3.8%, and other languages by 5.2%. No language could be spoken by 1.4% (e.g. too young to talk). New Zealand Sign Language was known by 0.5%. The percentage of people born overseas was 11.9, compared with 28.8% nationally.

Religious affiliations were 30.5% Christian, 1.0% New Age, and 1.0% other religions. People who answered that they had no religion were 57.1%, and 10.5% of people did not answer the census question.

Of those at least 15 years old, 72 (14.3%) people had a bachelor's or higher degree, 306 (60.7%) had a post-high school certificate or diploma, and 126 (25.0%) people exclusively held high school qualifications. The median income was $41,400, compared with $41,500 nationally. 39 people (7.7%) earned over $100,000 compared to 12.1% nationally. The employment status of those at least 15 was 273 (54.2%) full-time, 78 (15.5%) part-time, and 9 (1.8%) unemployed.

== Climate ==
Climate data for Otira, elevation 383 m (1,257 ft), (1981–2010)
Month	Jan	Feb	Mar	Apr	May	Jun	Jul	Aug	Sep	Oct	Nov	Dec	Year
Mean daily maximum °C (°F)	19.5 (67.1)	20.0 (68.0)	18.7 (65.7)	15.0 (59.0)	12.0 (53.6)	9.6 (49.3)	8.9 (48.0)	10.4 (50.7)	12.0 (53.6)	14.3 (57.7)	16.2 (61.2)	17.8 (64.0)	14.5 (58.2)
Daily mean °C (°F)	14.6 (58.3)	15.0 (59.0)	13.6 (56.5)	10.6 (51.1)	8.0 (46.4)	5.8 (42.4)	4.9 (40.8)	6.1 (43.0)	7.7 (45.9)	9.8 (49.6)	11.4 (52.5)	13.0 (55.4)	10.0 (50.1)
Mean daily minimum °C (°F)	9.7 (49.5)	10.0 (50.0)	8.5 (47.3)	6.1 (43.0)	3.9 (39.0)	1.9 (35.4)	0.8 (33.4)	1.9 (35.4)	3.3 (37.9)	5.3 (41.5)	6.7 (44.1)	8.3 (46.9)	5.5 (41.9)
Average rainfall mm (inches)	451.4 (17.77)	244.3 (9.62)	339.7 (13.37)	415.5 (16.36)	534.1 (21.03)	367.9 (14.48)	372.2 (14.65)	330.5 (13.01)	499.0 (19.65)	557.9 (21.96)	483.1 (19.02)	480.5 (18.92)	5,076.1 (199.84)
Source: NIWA (rain 1971–2000)

Climate data for Mount Philistine, elevation 1,655 m (5,430 ft), (1991–2020)
Month	Jan	Feb	Mar	Apr	May	Jun	Jul	Aug	Sep	Oct	Nov	Dec	Year
Mean daily maximum °C (°F)	10.1 (50.2)	10.4 (50.7)	9.0 (48.2)	6.6 (43.9)	4.7 (40.5)	2.9 (37.2)	1.7 (35.1)	2.0 (35.6)	3.3 (37.9)	4.2 (39.6)	6.0 (42.8)	8.3 (46.9)	5.8 (42.4)
Daily mean °C (°F)	6.9 (44.4)	7.4 (45.3)	6.1 (43.0)	3.8 (38.8)	2.0 (35.6)	0.1 (32.2)	−1.0 (30.2)	−0.8 (30.6)	0.3 (32.5)	1.3 (34.3)	3.0 (37.4)	5.3 (41.5)	2.9 (37.2)
Mean daily minimum °C (°F)	3.6 (38.5)	4.4 (39.9)	3.2 (37.8)	0.9 (33.6)	−0.7 (30.7)	−2.6 (27.3)	−3.8 (25.2)	−3.6 (25.5)	−2.6 (27.3)	−1.6 (29.1)	0.0 (32.0)	2.4 (36.3)	0.0 (31.9)
Source: NIWA
