= Castle Hill, New Zealand =

Place in New Zealand

Coordinates: 43.2287°S 171.7164°E

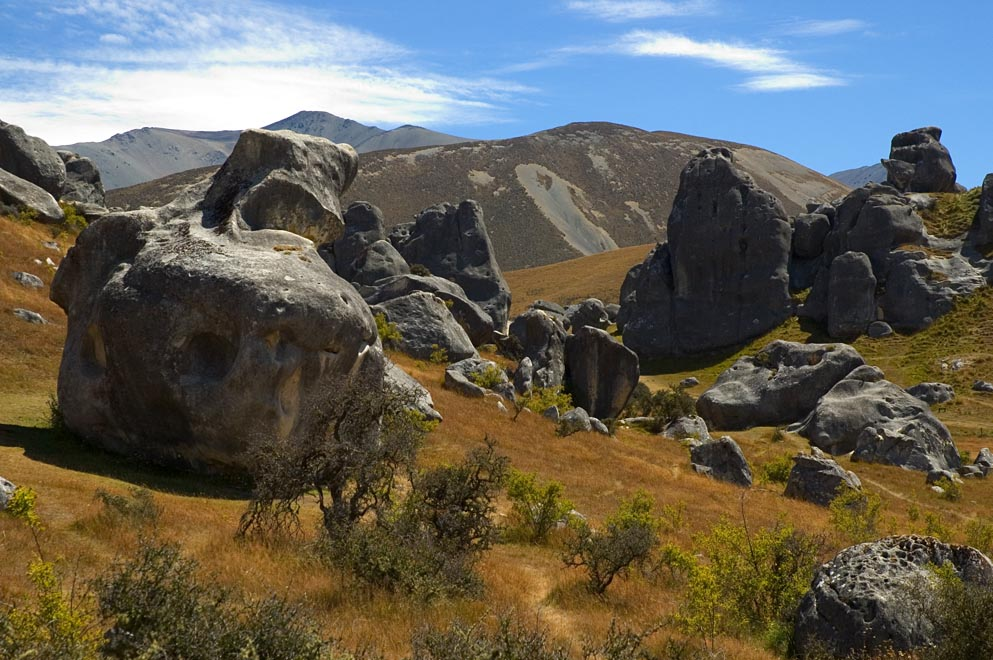
Castle Hill

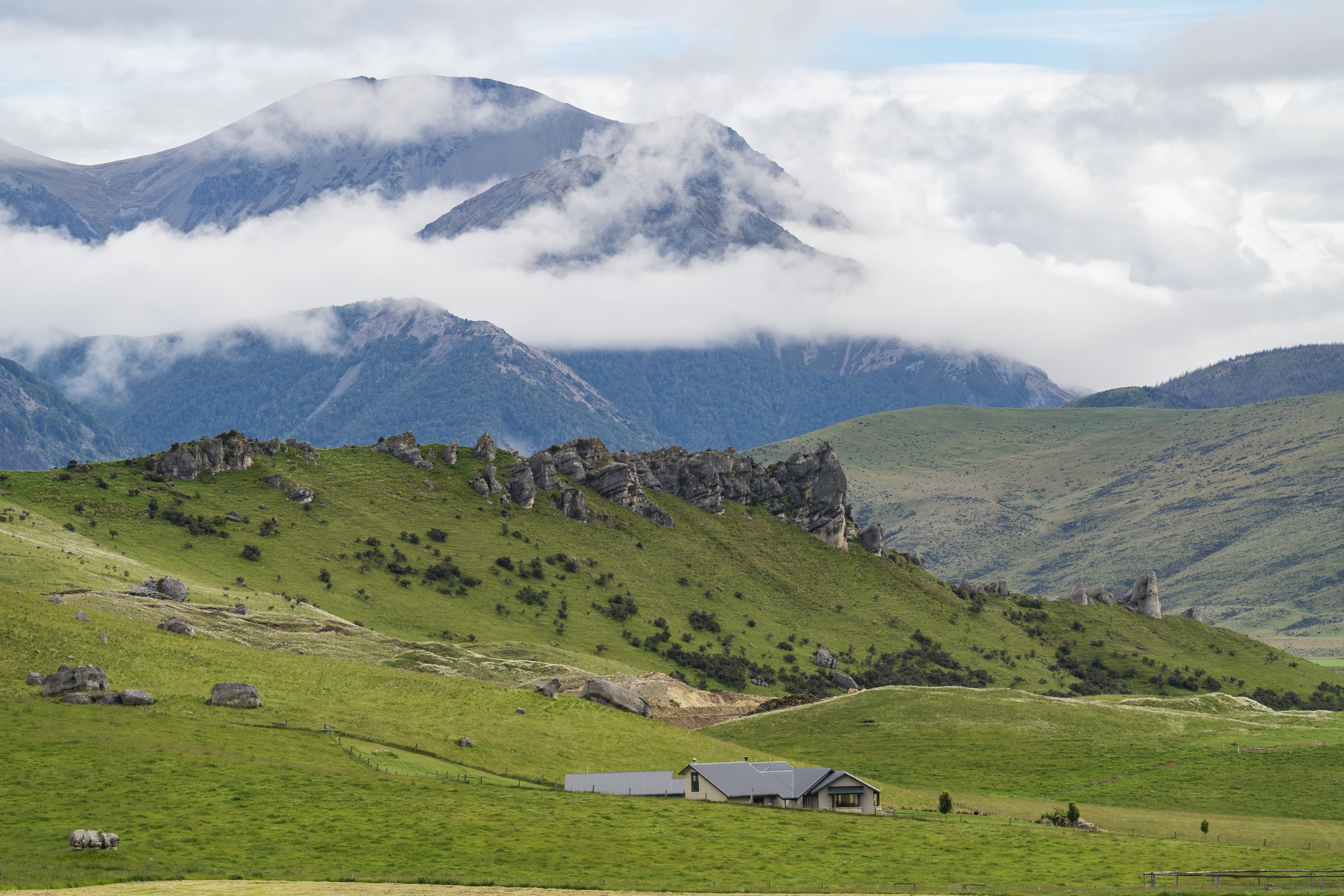

Castle Hill is a location and a high country station in New Zealand's South Island. It is located at an altitude of 700 metres, close to State Highway 73 between Springfield and Arthur's Pass. It is private property and located within the Kura Tawhiti Conservation Area.

The hill was so named because of the imposing array of limestone boulders in the area reminiscent of an old, run-down stone castle. The front of ChristChurch Cathedral in Christchurch was made from Castle Hill limestone. The station was established by the Porter brothers, and later owned by brothers John and Charles Enys. John Enys was a noted entomologist, and friend of novelist Samuel Butler.

It is widely considered to be the epitome of New Zealand's South Island climbing scene, where on any given day one can find rock climbers bouldering the unique limestone outcroppings. This area has recently seen more visitors, as nearby Flock Hill station was used for the filming of the climactic battle scenes of the 2005 movie, The Chronicles of Narnia: The Lion, the Witch and the Wardrobe. Flock Hill also has a huge number of climbable limestone boulders though access requires a short certification procedure via the internet, unlike Kura Tawhiti which, as a conservation area, allows free access at all times.

== Castle Hill Village ==
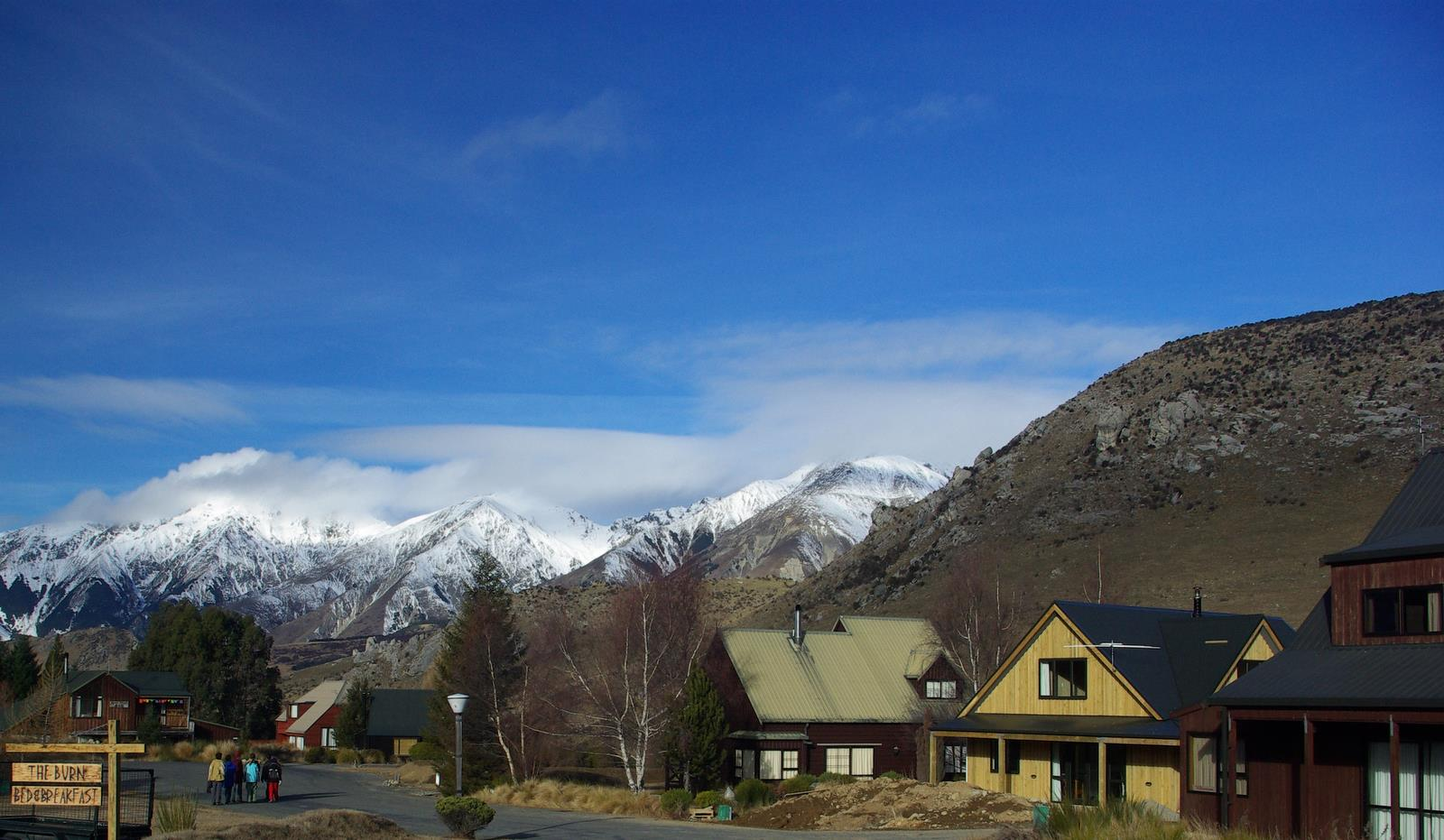
Castle Hill Village

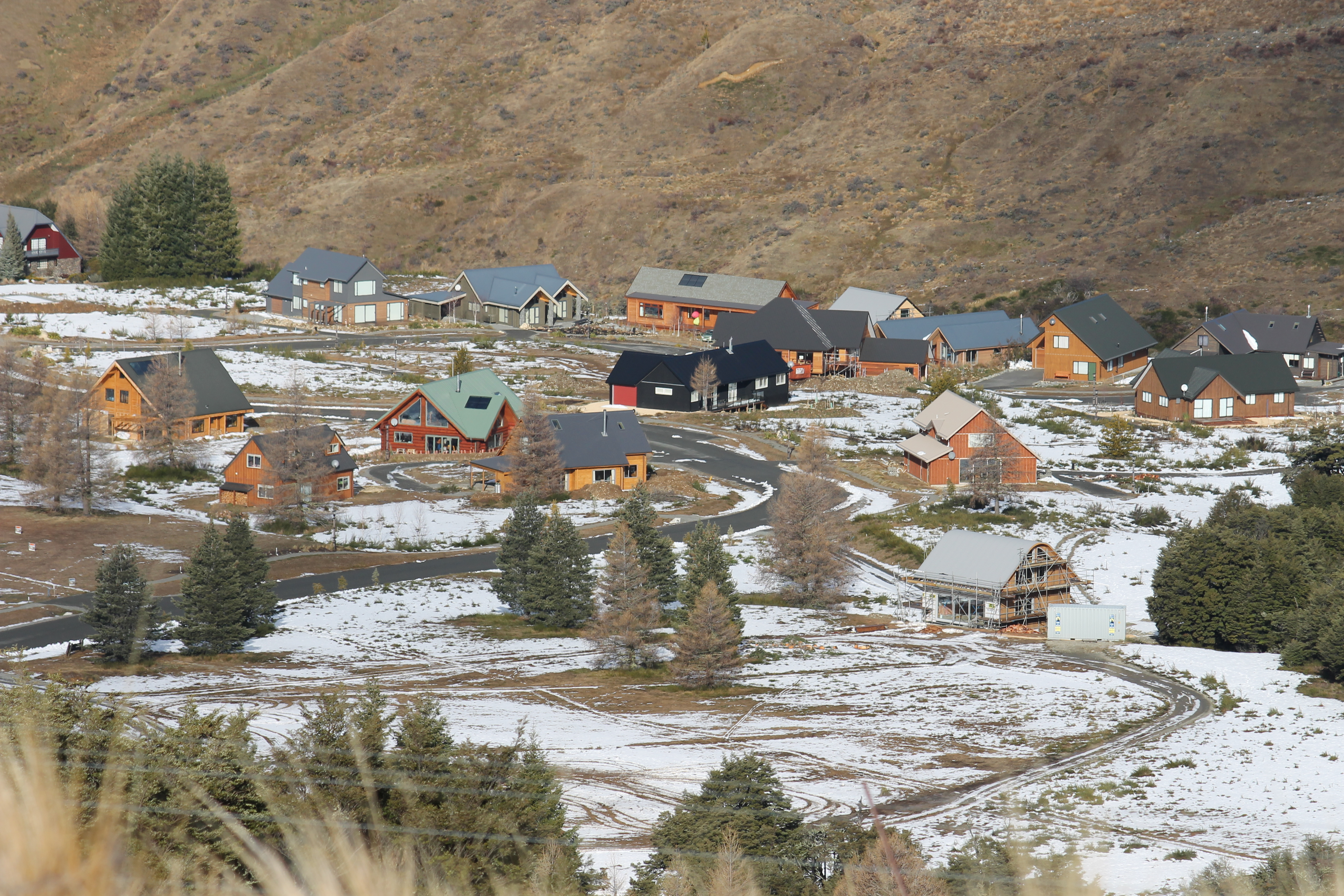
Castle Hill Village in June 2012

The nearby Castle Hill Village, located just north of Thomas River on State Highway 73, has a small number of permanent residents along with a number of holiday homes (used extensively during the winter ski season) but no public facilities other than a public toilet at the village hall and a children's playground. The village was started by the then-owner of Castle Hill Station, John Reid, in 1982.
