= Westland District =

- Territorial authority district
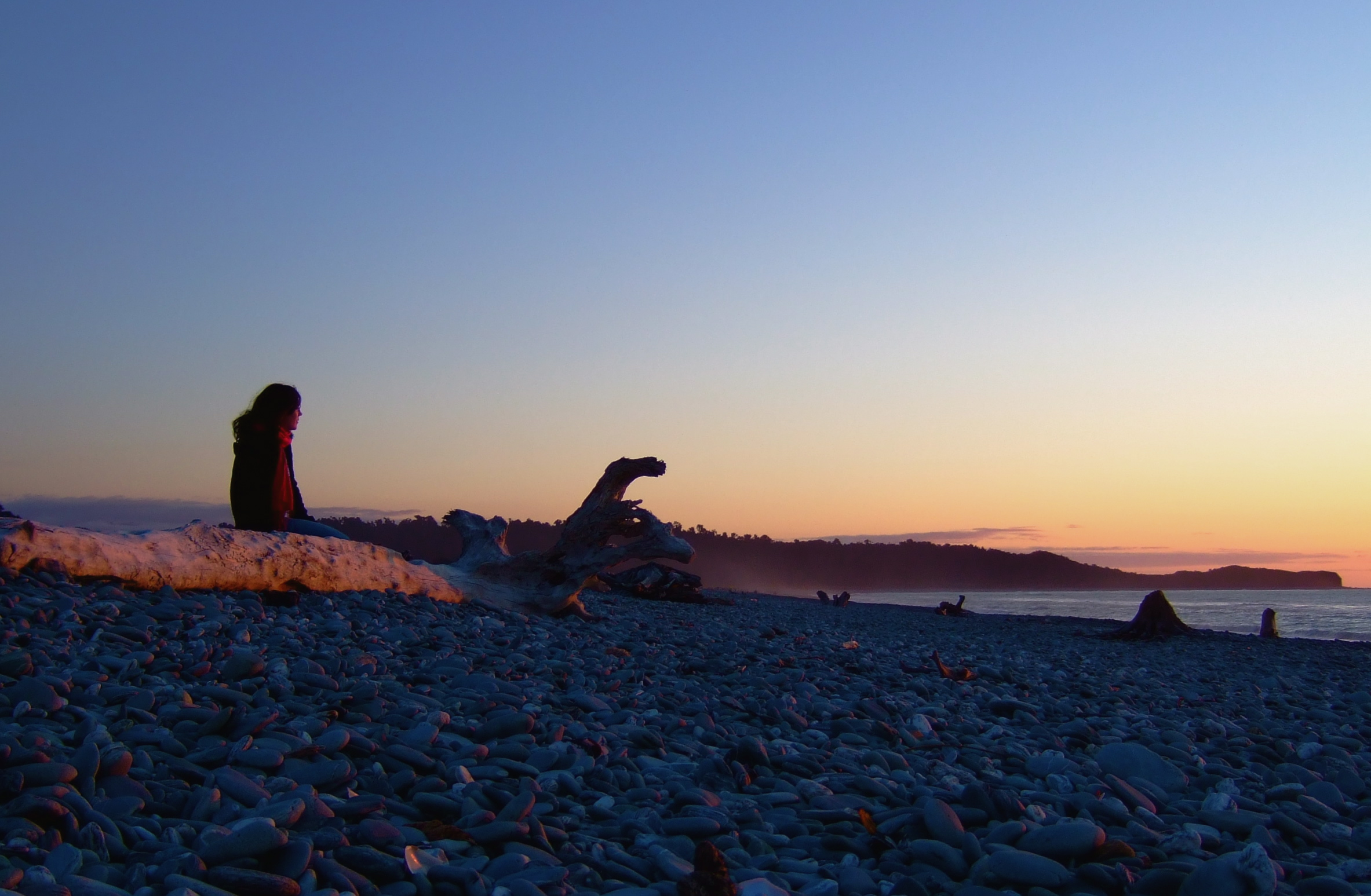
- Gillespie Beach, Westland

- Westland district in the South Island
- Coordinates: 43°30′S 170°00′E
- Country: New Zealand
- Region: West Coast
- Wards: Hokitika; Northern; Southern
- Seat: Hokitika

Government
  - Mayor: Helen Lash
  - Territorial authority: Westland District Council

Area
  - Total: 11,827.85 km^{2} (4,566.76 sq mi)

Population (June 2025)
  - Total: 9,430
  - Density: 0.797/km^{2} (2.06/sq mi)
- Time zone: UTC+12 (NZST)
  - Summer (DST): UTC+13 (NZDT)
- Postcode(s): Map of postcodes
- Area code: 03
- Website: www.westlanddc.govt.nz

Westland District is a territorial authority district on the West Coast of New Zealand's South Island. It is administered by the Westland District Council. The district's population is 9,430 (June 2025).

== History ==
Westland was originally a part of Canterbury Province, administered from Christchurch, on the east coast. The booming population as a result of the gold rush, together with the difficulty of travel and communication across the Southern Alps, led first to the creation of a special Westland County, then the formal separation of Westland from Canterbury to form the short-lived Westland Province (1873–1876). Westland Province also included what is now the southern portion of Grey District, with the provincial boundary at the Grey and Arnold rivers. Greymouth proper was in Westland Province, Cobden, on the north bank of the Grey River, was in Nelson Province.

After the abolition of the provinces in 1876, a new Westland County was created with roughly the same borders as the province. About this time, the population relative to the rest of the country began to decline, as the easily accessible gold soon ran out and the conditions were not ideal for farming. Local government changes saw the hinterland of Greymouth on both sides of the Grey River transformed into Greymouth Borough and Grey County and subsequently into Grey District, which includes portions of both historical provinces.

Westland as a unit of government emerged largely intact from the local government reforms of the 1980s and 1990s, merely changing from a county to a district and incorporating the Borough of Hokitika.

Recently, the population has begun to grow more quickly due to "lifestyle" residents moving into the district.

== Geography ==
The district consists of a long, thin strip of land between the crest of the Southern Alps and the Tasman Sea. The low-lying areas near the coast are a mixture of pastoral farmland and temperate rainforest. Westland temperate rainforests contain many conifers and receives high rates of precipitation due to orographic lifting caused by the Southern Alps. The eastern part of the district is steep and mountainous. Many small rivers flow down from the mountains. The middle part of the district notably contains the Franz Josef and Fox glaciers.

In the north, the Taramakau River, the largest river in the district, forms the boundary with the Grey District. The crest of the Southern Alps marks the eastern boundary. A small southern boundary lies between Westland proper and Fiordland, which lies within the Southland District. This boundary cannot be crossed by road.

=== Urban areas and settlements ===
Hokitika, the district seat, is the only town in the Westland District with a population over 1,000. It is home to 3,420 people, 36.3% of the district's population.

Other settlements and localities include:

Hokitika Ward:

- Blue Spur
- **Hokitika**
- **Kaniere**
- Seaview

Northern Ward:

- Arahura
- Awatuna
- Dillmanstown
- Jacksons
- Kaihinu
- Kokatahi
- **Kumara**
- Kumara Junction
- Otira
- Rimu
- **Ross**
- Ruatapu
- Woodstock
- Chesterfield
- Callaghans
- Stafford
- Goldsborough/Waimea
- Humphreys
- Arthurstown
- Takutai
- Houhou
- Turiwhate
- Wainihinihi
- Milltown
- Kowhitirangi
- Mananui
- Donoghues
- Aickens
- Candys Bend
- Deaths Corner

Southern Ward:

- Bruce Bay
- **Fox Glacier**
- **Franz Josef / Waiau**
- **Haast**
- Hannahs Clearing
- **Hari Hari**
- Jackson Bay
- Neils Beach
- Ōkārito
- Okuru
- Pukekura
- Te Taho
- Whataroa
- Fergusons
- Kakapotahi
- Waitaha
- Herepo
- The Forks
- Tatare
- Gillespies Beach
- Karangarua
- Jacobs River
- Mahitahi
- Lake Paringa
- Haast Junction
- Haast Beach
- Waiatoto
- Arawhata
- Rotokino
- Lake Moeraki
- Haast Pass/Tiriopatea

Notes: bold - settlement; normal text - locality; italics - minor locality

== Demography ==
Westland District covers 11,827.85 km^{2} (4,566.76 sq mi) and had an estimated population of 9,430 as of June 2025, with a population density of 0.80 people per km^{2}. The district is the most sparsely populated of New Zealand's 67 territorial authorities.

Historical population
| Year | Pop. | ±% p.a. |
|---|---|---|
| 2006 | 8,403 | — |
| 2013 | 8,304 | −0.17% |
| 2018 | 8,640 | +0.80% |
| 2023 | 8,901 | +0.60% |

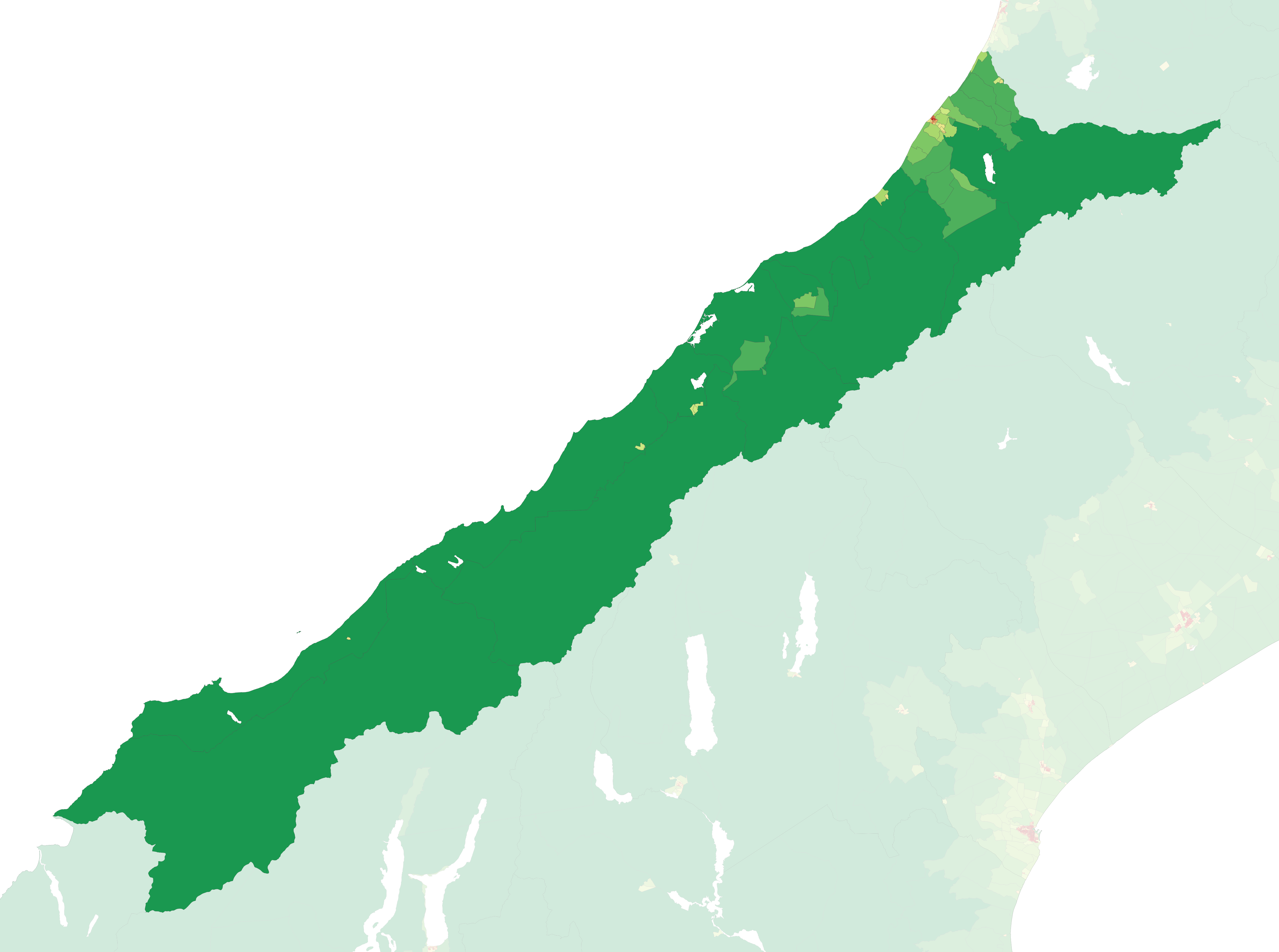
Population density in the 2023 census

Westland District had a population of 8,901 in the 2023 New Zealand census, an increase of 261 people (3.0%) since the 2018 census, and an increase of 597 people (7.2%) since the 2013 census. There were 4,539 males, 4,338 females and 24 people of other genders in 4,059 dwellings. 2.7% of people identified as LGBTIQ+. The median age was 47.3 years (compared with 38.1 years nationally). There were 1,377 people (15.5%) aged under 15 years, 1,206 (13.5%) aged 15 to 29, 4,437 (49.8%) aged 30 to 64, and 1,887 (21.2%) aged 65 or older.

People could identify as more than one ethnicity. The results were 87.2% European (Pākehā); 16.5% Māori; 2.0% Pasifika; 4.7% Asian; 0.5% Middle Eastern, Latin American and African New Zealanders (MELAA); and 4.6% other, which includes people giving their ethnicity as "New Zealander". English was spoken by 97.8%, Māori language by 3.2%, Samoan by 0.5% and other languages by 7.1%. No language could be spoken by 1.5% (e.g. too young to talk). New Zealand Sign Language was known by 0.4%. The percentage of people born overseas was 15.1, compared with 28.8% nationally.

Religious affiliations were 30.7% Christian, 0.6% Hindu, 0.2% Islam, 0.4% Māori religious beliefs, 0.3% Buddhist, 0.8% New Age, and 1.1% other religions. People who answered that they had no religion were 57.1%, and 8.9% of people did not answer the census question.

Of those at least 15 years old, 837 (11.1%) people had a bachelor's or higher degree, 4,191 (55.7%) had a post-high school certificate or diploma, and 2,181 (29.0%) people exclusively held high school qualifications. The median income was $36,800, compared with $41,500 nationally. 546 people (7.3%) earned over $100,000 compared to 12.1% nationally. The employment status of those at least 15 was that 3,882 (51.6%) people were employed full-time, 1,074 (14.3%) were part-time, and 138 (1.8%) were unemployed.

Individual statistical areas
| Name | Area (km^{2}) | Population | Density (per km^{2}) | Dwellings | Median age | Median income |
|---|---|---|---|---|---|---|
| Haast | 4,099.09 | 258 | 0.06 | 147 | 55.2 years | $35,900 |
| Westland Glaciers-Bruce Bay | 3,057.44 | 816 | 0.27 | 429 | 38.3 years | $37,100 |
| Arahura-Kūmara | 264.41 | 1,497 | 5.66 | 639 | 51.8 years | $38,700 |
| Hokitika | 11.78 | 3,267 | 277.33 | 1,461 | 46.7 years | $35,900 |
| Hokitika Rural | 140.96 | 1,317 | 9.34 | 594 | 49.9 years | $39,100 |
| Waitaha | 1,497.78 | 471 | 0.31 | 237 | 52.2 years | $30,300 |
| Whataroa-Harihari | 1,136.25 | 645 | 0.57 | 291 | 45.7 years | $35,300 |
| Hokitika Valley-Otira | 1,620.14 | 630 | 0.39 | 267 | 43.1 years | $41,400 |
| New Zealand | | | | | 38.1 years | $41,500 |

Individual wards
| Name | Area (km^{2}) | Population | Density (per km^{2}) | Dwellings | Median age | Median income |
|---|---|---|---|---|---|---|
| Northern Ward | 2,346.82 | 3,558 | 1.52 | 1,560 | 50.1 years | $38,000 |
| Hokitika Ward | 14.56 | 3,507 | 240.87 | 1,566 | 47.0 years | $36,200 |
| Southern Ward | 9,466.48 | 1,836 | 0.19 | 933 | 42.1 years | $36,300 |
| New Zealand | | | | | 38.1 years | $41,500 |

== Government ==
The Westland District is governed by an elected council, headed by a mayor, who is elected at large. The current mayor is Helen Lash. Councillors are elected to represent multi-member wards. Three councillors are elected for the Northern Ward, three for the Southern Ward, and four for the town of Hokitika.

The district is one of three included within the West Coast Region.

== Economy ==
In the early years of settlement in Westland, gold was a major commodity, bringing prospectors flocking into the area. After the gold ran out, those who remained turned to pastoral farming. (Unlike the more northern parts of the West Coast, Westland has not developed coal mining.) Recently, tourism has become more important, with drawcards such as the glaciers, and events such as the Hokitika Wildfoods Festival.
