= Jacksons, New Zealand =

Jacksons
- Location within New Zealand
- Coordinates: 42°45′S 171°31′E
- Country: New Zealand
- Region: West Coast
- District: Westland District

Jacksons is a settlement and railway station in the Westland District of the West Coast of New Zealand. The TranzAlpine Express passes through Jacksons.

Jacksons was the railhead for the Midland Line from Stillwater via Moana from 1894, until the line was extended to Otira in 1899. The station opened on 1 March 1894 (using a building from Teremakau on 23 February 1894), and closed on 3 November 1986.

The Jackson’s Accommodation House, now the Jackson Tavern, was bought by Michael Jackson in 1870; Michael and his brother Adam from Scotland had moved there after spending some time on the Otago Goldfields. The hotel was a stop for Christchurch-Hokotika coaches. The hotel was swept away in a flash flood in 1871, and was rebuilt as the Perry Range Hotel. In 1910 it was rebuilt and in 1970 it passed out of the Jackson family, but was renamed the Jackson Tavern. Adam moved to Canterbury, but his eldest daughter Jessie married William Aicken who began the Aickens Accommodation House 10 km away at Aickens.
