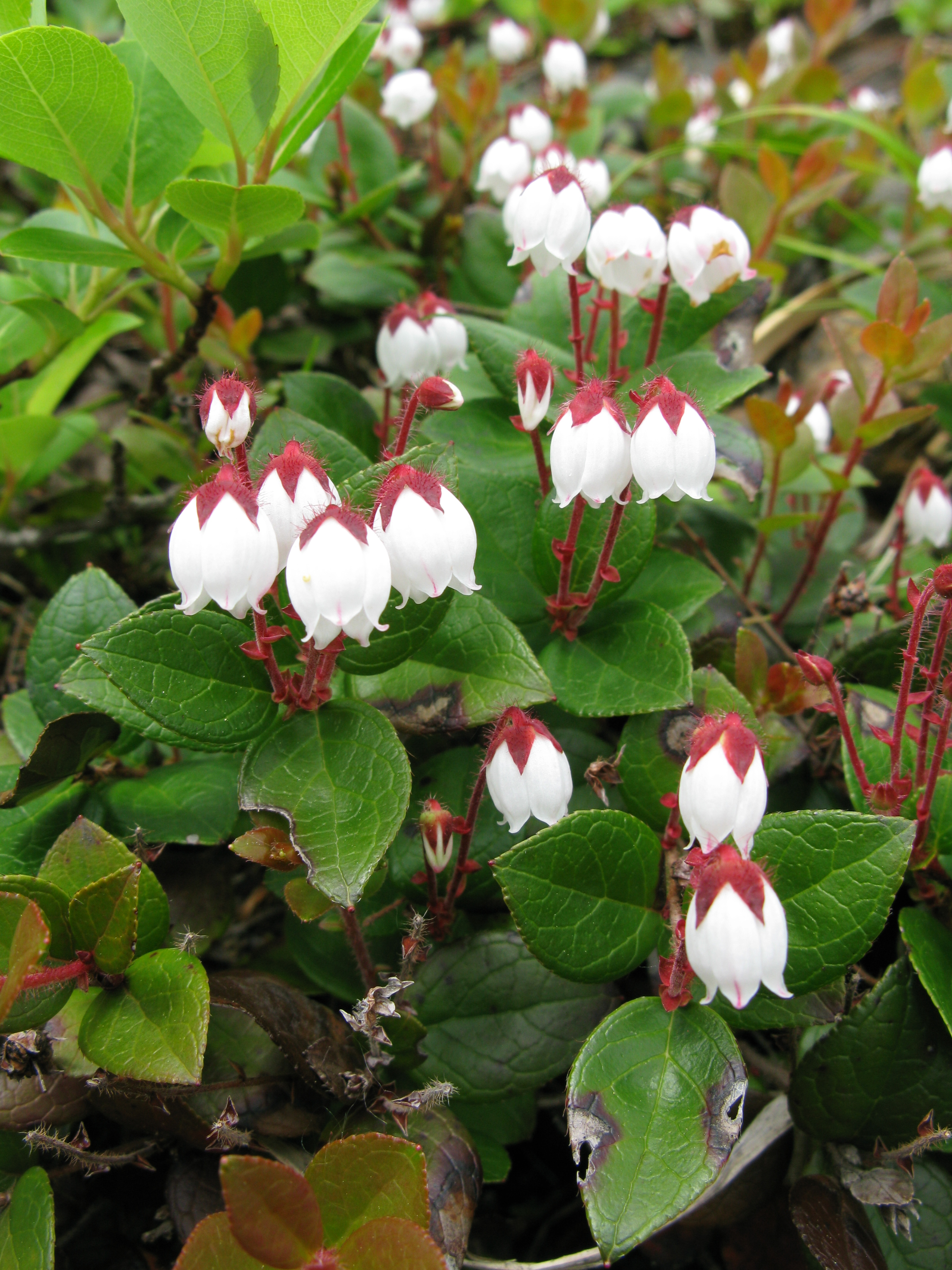
- G. adenothrix flowering in Fukushima Prefecture

Scientific classification
- Kingdom: Plantae
- Clade: Tracheophytes
- Clade: Angiosperms
- Clade: Eudicots
- Clade: Asterids
- Order: Ericales
- Family: Ericaceae
- Genus: Gaultheria
- Species: G. adenothrix

Binomial name
- Gaultheria adenothrix (Miq.) Maxim.

Synonyms
- Andromeda adenothrix Miq.; Brossaea adenothrix (Maxim.) Kuntze; Diplycosia adenothrix (Miq.) Nakai; Gaultheria ovatifolia subsp. adenothrix (Miq.) T.Shimizu

= Gaultheria adenothrix =

Species of flowering plant

Gaultheria adenothrix, known as アカモノ (akamono) or イワハゼ (iwahaze), is a small evergreen shrub in the Ericaceae. It is one of three Gaultheria species native to Japan and grows in low-mountain to subalpine areas.

== Description ==
Gaultheria adenothrix is an evergreen shrub growing in clusters 10–30 cm in height. It produces subterranean creeping stems as well as aerial stems. The biennial leaves, 1–2.5 cm long and 0.7-2 cm long, are alternate and broadly ovate with serrate margins. The petioles are 1–2 mm long. The veins are slightly depressed on the upper surfaces of the leaves.

Each branch contains 1–4 nodding urceolate flowers, and there is a solitary flower on the upper leaf axil. The corolla, 6–8 mm in size, is white to faintly pinkish-white and shallowly five-lobed with slightly reflexed margins. The abaxial surface of the petals has a reddish midrib. The calyx is 3–4 mm long, vivid red and comprises 5 triangular-ovate lobes. The pedicels are 1.5–3mm long. Each flower contains 10 stamens, each around 2 mm long with awnless anthers. The pistil is 4–5 mm long and glabrous with a depressed globose ovary around 1.5 mm in diameter. The young stems, petioles, pedicels, and sepals have long hairs.

After anthesis, the calyx grows, envelops the capsule, and becomes a spherical pseudofruit 6–7 mm in diameter that turns red as it ripens. The pseudofruit is edible and has a sweet taste. The seeds are compressed ellipsoids, 0.5–0.8 mm in length and lustrous. G. adenothrix flowers from July to early August in the alpine zone in central to eastern Japan and in May to June in the montane zone in western Japan.

== Taxonomy ==
Gaultheria adenothrix was described by Friedrich Anton Wilhelm Miquel as Andromeda adenothrix in 1863. It was transferred to Gaultheria by Karl Maximovich in 1872. The name akamomo means "red peach" in Japanese, referring to the color and sweet taste of the fruit.

Gaultheria adenothrix is closely related to the North American species G. humifusa and G. ovatifolia, as they share toothed ovate leaves, solitary flowers, fleshy fruiting calyces and awnless anthers. Together, these three species form the section Amblyandra. Though in 1921 G. adenothrix was suggested by Japanese botanist Takenoshin Nakai to belong to Diplycosia, a clade sometimes lumped into Gaultheria, sect. Amblyandra has been demonstrated to be a monophyletic group within a different clade in Gaultheria.

Each of the three Gaultheria species native to Japan (G. adenothrix, G. japonica, and G. pyroloides) belongs to a different clade within the genus. Similar to G. adenothrix, G. japonica (sect. Chiogenes or Hispidulae) has close relatives in North America. On the other hand, G. pyroloides is most closely related to several Southeast Asian high mountain species.

Gaultheria adenothrix has been proposed to be a subspecies of G. ovatifolia, but authors currently accept it as a separate species due to the wide geographical separation, as well as morphological differences such as calyx texture and taste. Its chromosome number is 2n = 22.

== Distribution and habitat ==
Gaultheria adenothrix grows in the edges of coniferous woods and sub-alpine zones. It prefers dry or somewhat moist areas around forests or marshes and can be found on stony slopes in serpentine areas at 400–1900 m. It is endemic to Japan and can be found in western Hokkaido, Shikoku, and the Japan Sea side of Honshu.

== Gallery ==
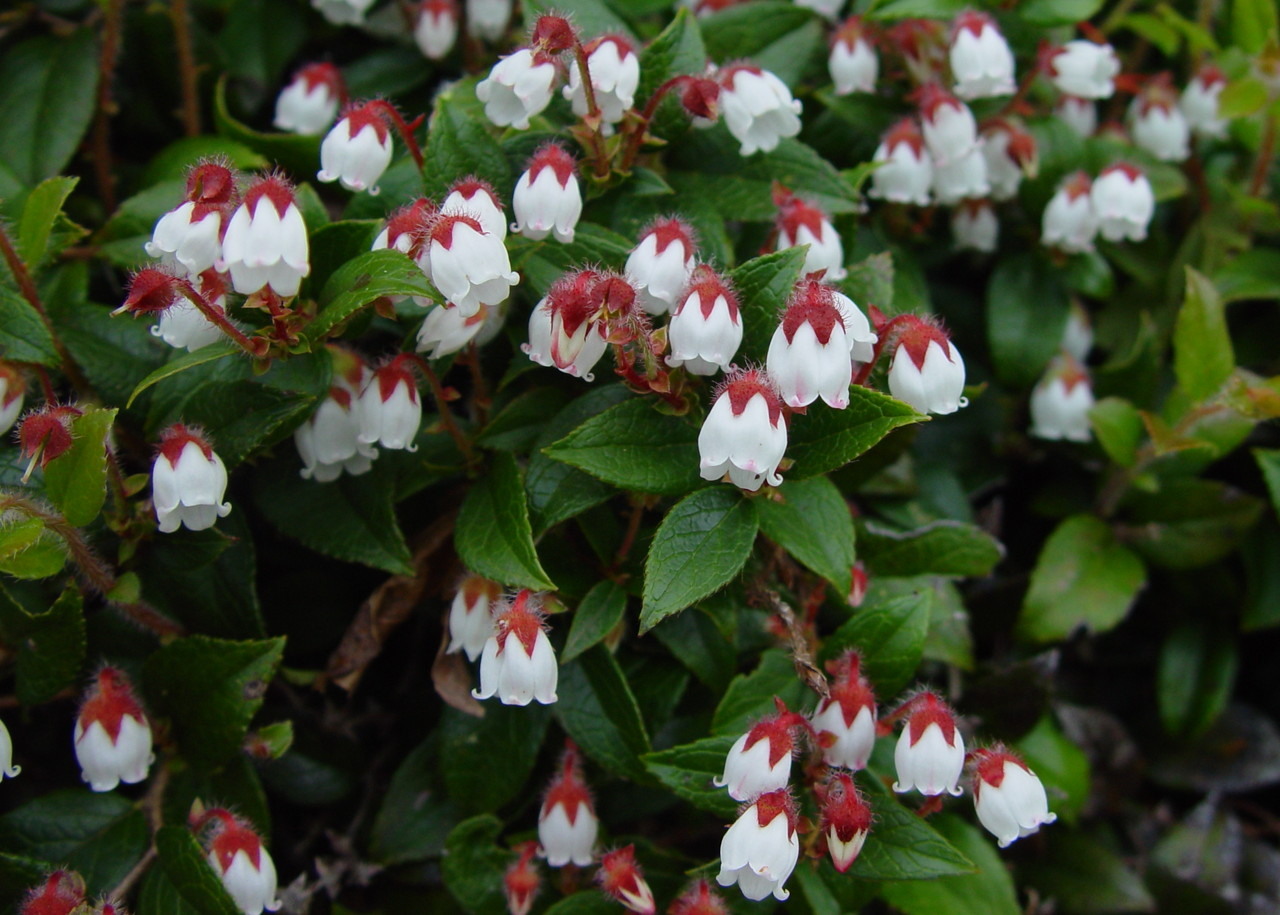
Flowering plant on Mount Sannomine

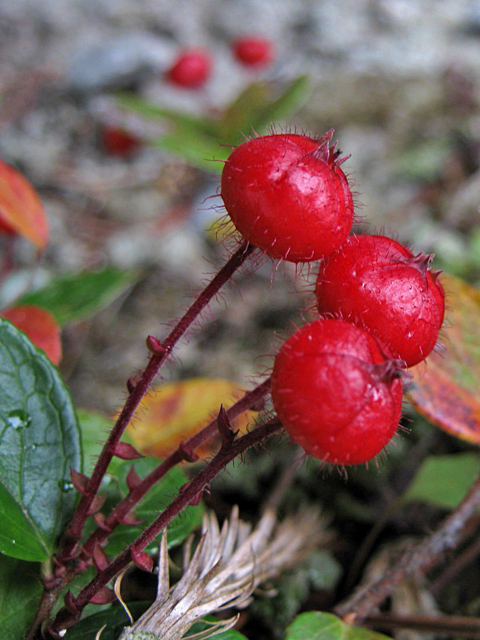
Hairy pseudofruits
