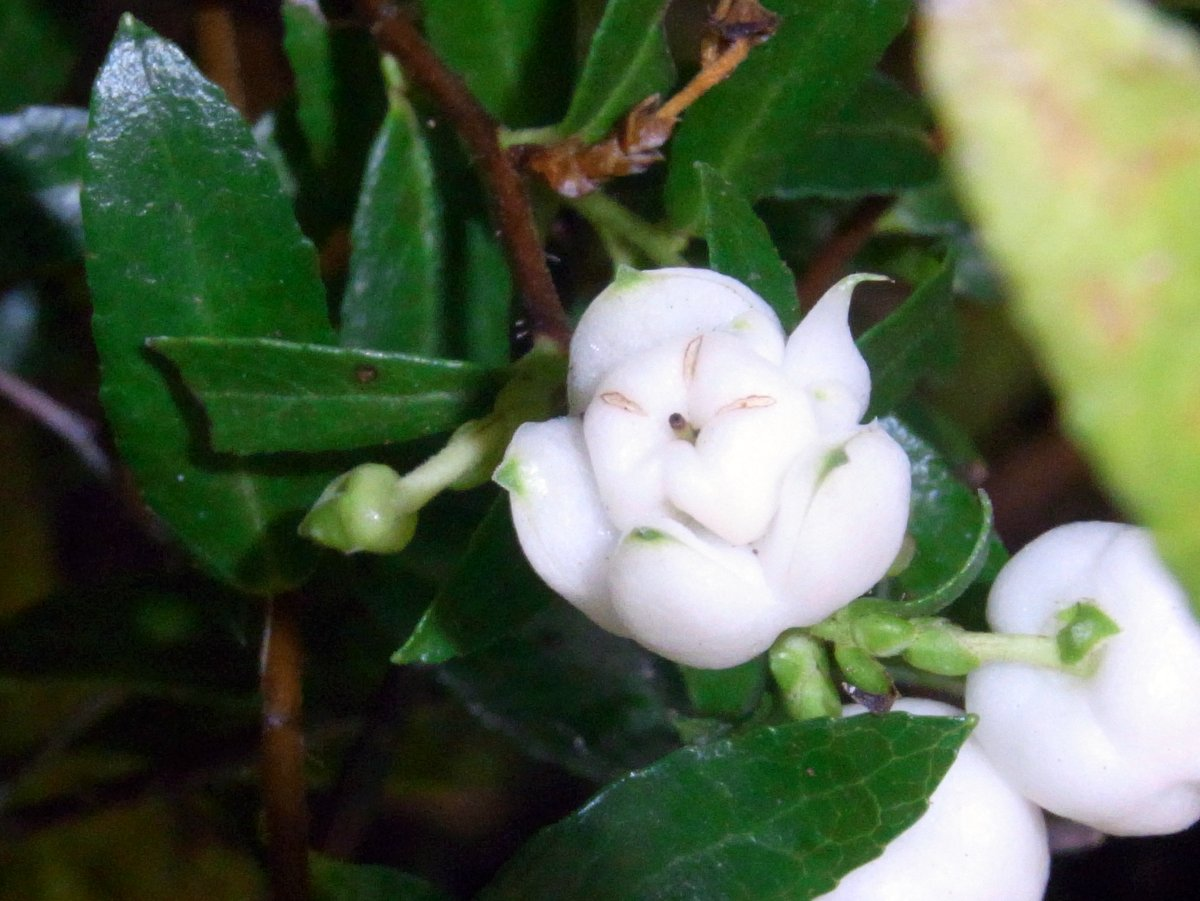

Scientific classification
- Kingdom: Plantae
- Clade: Tracheophytes
- Clade: Angiosperms
- Clade: Eudicots
- Clade: Asterids
- Order: Ericales
- Family: Ericaceae
- Genus: Gaultheria
- Species: G. depressa

Binomial name
- Gaultheria depressa Hook.f.

= Gaultheria depressa =

Mountain snowberry

Species of flowering plant

Gaultheria depressa, commonly known as the mountain snowberry or alpine wax berry, is a small ground-hugging shrub of the heath family Ericaceae native to rocky alpine areas of Tasmania, Australia, and New Zealand.

== Description ==
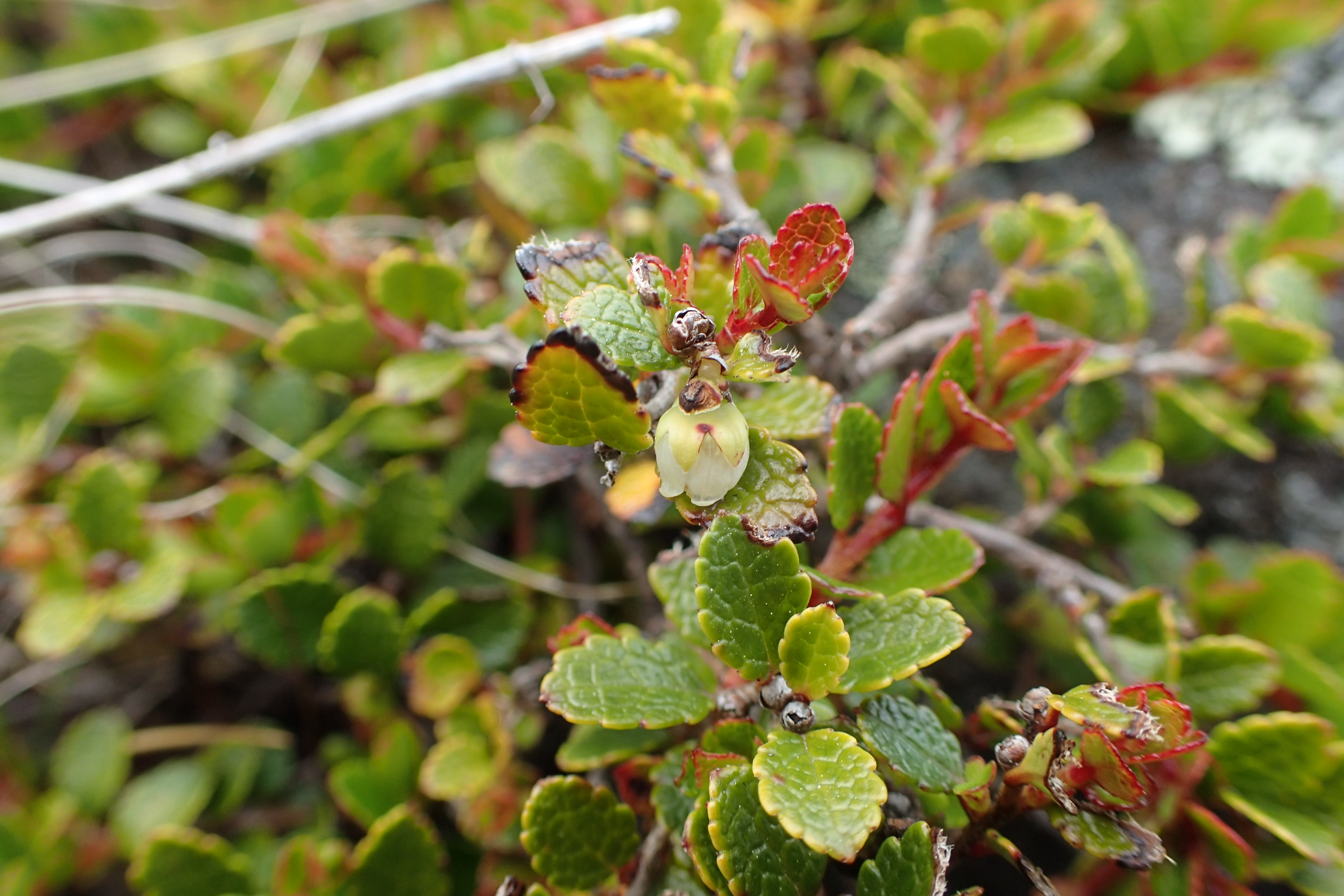
The leaves of Gaultheria depressa.

In Australia, Gaultheria depressa is a prostrate shrub 10 to 20 cm (4 to 8 in) high and 50 to 150 cm (19.5 to 59 in) across. It grows larger in New Zealand. The small leaves can be oval or round and measure 0.5 to 1 cm (0.20 to 0.39 in) in length and have serrate margins. The small white tubular flowers appear from September to January and are followed by white or red fruit which is around 1 cm (0.39 in) in diameter. The berries are edible.

== Taxonomy ==
Joseph Dalton Hooker described Gaultheria depressa in 1847 from a collection by Ronald Campbell Gunn at Ben Lomond in Tasmania. The species name is Latin depressa 'flat'. Analysis of DNA shows the next closest relative to Gaultheria depressa is the New Zealand species Gaultheria antipoda, which suggests the Australian populations of G. depressa dispersed to Australia from New Zealand. The next closest relative to the two species is the New Zealand species Gaultheria oppositifolia.

== Distribution and habitat ==
In New Zealand, the prostrate habit and dependent fruit shielded by foliage from above suggest it is suited for dispersal by lizards. Furthermore, the ground weta species (Zealandosandrus maculifrons) has been recorded eating the fruit.

It is suitable for rockeries in gardens in temperate climates and has been available commercially in England. It prefers well-drained acidic soil in part shade.

== Uses ==
Early settlers in the southern district of Otago region of New Zealand used to make snowberry pies out of the Gaultheria depressa fruit.

== Varieties ==
This species has the following varieties:

- Gaultheria depressa var. depressa (native to Tasmania and New Zealand)
- Gaultheria depressa var. novae-zealandiae (endemic to New Zealand)

== See also ==
- Gaultheria crassa, with which it hybridises
