= Waxberry =

Waxberry is a common name for several plants and may refer to:

- Gaultheria appressa, from Australia
- Myrica pensylvanica, from eastern North America
- Pollichia campestris, from eastern Africa and Arabia
- Symphoricarpos, a genus of the honeysuckle family

The name "waxberry" is also a common mistranslation to the Chinese fruit, Yangmei (杨梅) or Myrica rubra.
