= Jean Gaultier =

Jean Gaultier may refer to:

- Jean Paul Gaultier, French fashion designer
- Jean François Gaultier, French physician and botanist
