= Prickly heath =

Prickly heath is a common name for several plants and may refer to:

- Gaultheria mucronata, native to South America
- Leptecophylla juniperina, native to Australia and New Zealand
