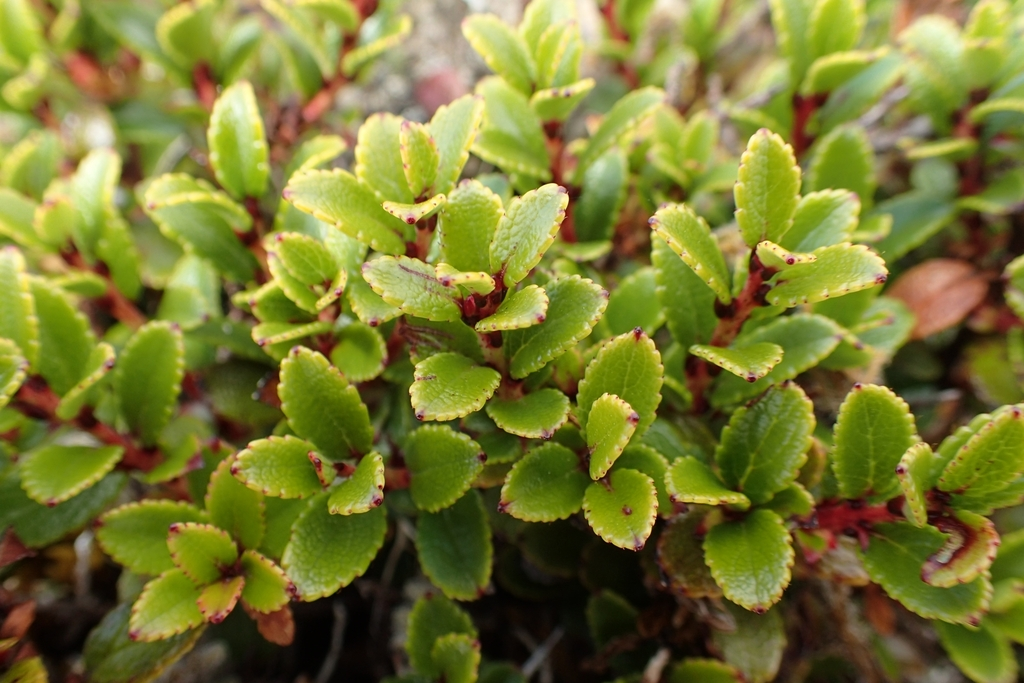

Scientific classification
- Kingdom: Plantae
- Clade: Tracheophytes
- Clade: Angiosperms
- Clade: Eudicots
- Clade: Asterids
- Order: Ericales
- Family: Ericaceae
- Genus: Gaultheria
- Species: G. crassa

Binomial name
- Gaultheria crassa Allan

= Gaultheria crassa =

Species of plant in New Zealand

Gaultheria crassa, commonly known as the scarlet snowberry, is a species of small shrub that belongs to the heath family Ericaceae. It is endemic to New Zealand.

== Description ==
Gaultheria crassa is a small branched shrub which can grow up to 1–2 meters in height. The name crassa originates from the Latin term crassus, meaning thick, fleshy, dense or fat which is related to the characteristics of its leaves. These are thick with a narrow elliptical shape. Small in size, the leaves range from 10–15 mm long and 5–7 mm wide. The leaf margins, or edge, are subtly toothed with a rounded base. The leaves are browny green and form from the branchlets in an alternate arrangement. Petioles are short and red. Branches are pale green with both branches and stems covered in small and sparse black hairs. These hairs can be used to distinguish the species from its closest relative Gaultheria rupestris, which has a denser covering of hairs. Gualtheria crassa has pale white bell-shaped flowers with both the corolla and calyx being white. Individual flowers are around 3 mm in length and have tiny hairs covering the inside of the flower giving them a downy texture. These form in clusters on racemes. The racemes on Gaultheria crassa are generally 8 cm long. The clusters of flowers are found in the terminal position. They have a non-fleshy calyx with seeds forming from a dry capsule which are 2 mm in diameter and segmented into 5.

== Range ==
Gaultheria crassa is endemic to New Zealand. It is found in the southern areas of New Zealand, from the Ruahine Range in the North Island, reaching down the length of the South Island. It is abundant among subalpine and alpine scrub as well as among shrubland on the eastern side of the South Island mountain ranges. It is common in Aoraki / Mount Cook National Park and is most widespread in Canterbury alpine regions. Populations in the Craigieburn Range, Lake Lyndon, Cass and Otira Valley in Arthurs Pass National Park have been subject to studies.

== Habitat ==
This species has a preference for rocky places and open scrub among the mountains of the South Island of New Zealand. It is found at altitudes between 700 m and 1700 m, suggesting a preference for a colder alpine environment. It is often an early coloniser of stable moraine sites where glacial debris has created an ideal habitat of loose rocks and low competition. The species prefers drier terrain and is therefore more common on the drier eastern side of the Southern Alps. This differs from its close relative G. rupestris, which is more abundant on the wetter areas of the West Coast mountain ranges.

In its southern locations, the soils of its habitats consist mostly of greywacke sandstone rocks, while in the North Island, it is found on the eastern side of Mount Ruapehu where the soil is mostly a mixture of volcanic sand and gravel. In Cass, Gaultheria crassa grows among other shrub species. Here, the soil type was recorded as being strongly leeched high-country yellow-brown earths. Temperatures in the area had a yearly average of 9 °C with 130 cm of rainfall. This, however, is variable as the area can experience dry and warm summers as well as wet and cold springs. This shows that areas where the species is found can have extreme seasonal variability in both rainfall and temperature. The variety of conditions in which the species is found suggests that Gaultheria crassa is a variable and persistent species.

== Ecology ==
=== Life cycle and phenology ===
Tiny clusters of Gaultheria crassa's creamy bell-shaped flowers appear from October to December. Flowering occurs in succession with other scrub plants in the community. The flowering of one community was documented showing this succession. Flowering occurred first with Corokia cotoneaster, initiating the flowering sequence, followed next by Gaultheria crassa and then by Discaria toumatou. Frequented by many insects, flowers of the shrub species are a major source of pollen and nectar for insects in the alpine and subalpine communities. Gaultheria crassa flowers turn to fruits from January to April and unlike other species in the family, they do not form fleshy fruit. The calyx is dry in mature fruit where seeds form from the dry capsule and are produced in large quantities. These small and numerous seeds are wind-dispersed, a necessary requirement for plants in harsh moraine habitats where unstable rocks can often cause disturbances.

Gaultheria crassa seeds are pointy in shape and range from 0.50–0.90 mm in length. The outside of the seed ranges from a pale yellow-orange to dark brown or henna shade. The Gaultheria genus has long-lived seeds that create a persistent seed bank. Studies show that germination of Gaultheria crassa seeds are often delayed by 2–3 weeks with germination occurring readily after this time frame. Light is found to be a requirement for the germination and seeds have been reported to be viable for up to 12 months, with reduced germination after 16 months.

=== Predators, parasites, and diseases ===
This species is known to be included in the diet of Westland chamois and is also likely to be included in the diet of feral goat with studies of Galutheria crassa showing the plant having more prominence in goat-free locations. This suggests that feral goats may be a major predator of the species and the suggestion is supported by goats browsing on closely related Gaultheria antipoda. Thar find Gaultheria crassa extremely palatable, and thus are another predator for the species. There are no other reports of predators, and the abundance of G. crassa among alpine scrub and shrublands could suggest that predation of the species is low where thar, goats and chamois are absent.

== Other information ==
Ten Gaultheria species (of over 200) are native to New Zealand. The group is believed to have evolved less than 80 million years ago, meaning they arrived after the landmass split from the continent of Gondwana. There is strong phylogenetic data suggesting that the New Zealand species are most closely related to Gaultheria in South America, with a high likelihood that these have naturally dispersed to New Zealand and since speciated. Gaultheria also has sister taxa in Australia and it is highly likely that Australian species originated from the dispersal of New Zealand species.

Many New Zealand species of Gaultheria are known to readily hybridise with each other. A hybrid between Gaultheria crassa and Gaultheria depressa (mountain snowberry) is found to have the typical white berries of mountain snowberry and the larger thicker leaves of Gaultheria crassa. Other hybridisation has been reported between G. macrostima x crassa.

Another well-studied area of the Gaultheria species in New Zealand is their gynodioecy. This is a phenomenon where some plants within a species have only seed-producing flowers, and others have flowers producing both pollen and seeds. This phenomenon is seen with Gaultheria crassa, with slight flower variation between female flowers, and bisexual flowers recorded.
