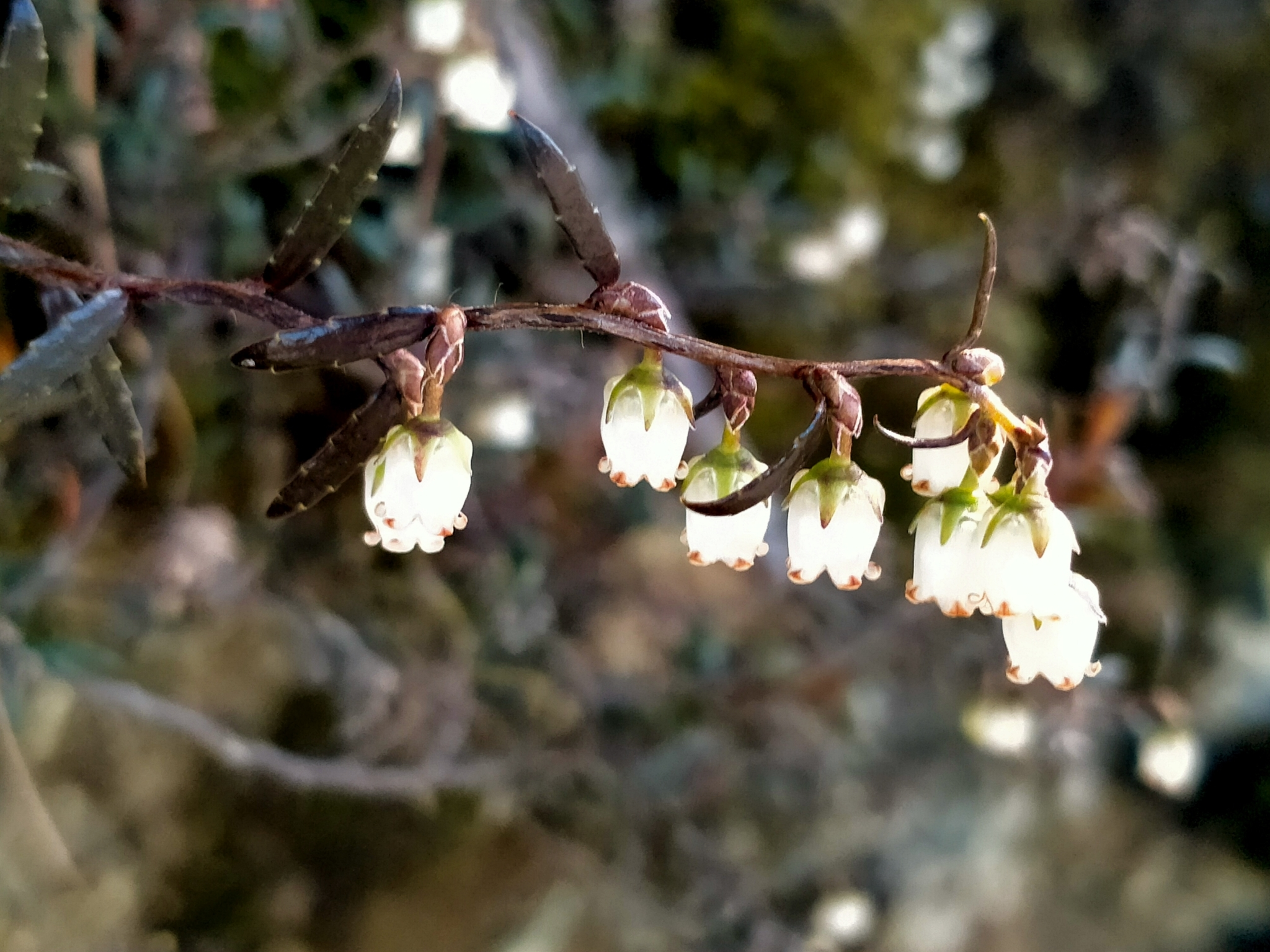
- Gaultheria macrostigma near Dunedin

Conservation status
- Not Threatened (NZ TCS)

Scientific classification
- Kingdom: Plantae
- Clade: Embryophytes
- Clade: Tracheophytes
- Clade: Angiosperms
- Clade: Eudicots
- Clade: Asterids
- Order: Ericales
- Family: Ericaceae
- Genus: Gaultheria
- Species: G. macrostigma

Binomial name
- Gaultheria macrostigma (Colenso) D.J.Middleton

= Gaultheria macrostigma =

Species of flowering plant

Gaultheria macrostigma, or prostrate snowberry, is a species of Gaultheria, endemic to New Zealand.

== Description ==
A small shrub that grows either prostrate or "staggling". It has small white flowers, and the stigma (noted in the specificic name macrostigma) has been described as "large."

== Range ==
Across New Zealand.

== Etymology ==
macrostigma means "large stigma."

== Taxonomy ==
Gaultheria macrostigma was moved into this genus from Pernettya in 1990. It is also known to hybridize with Gaultheria antipoda.
