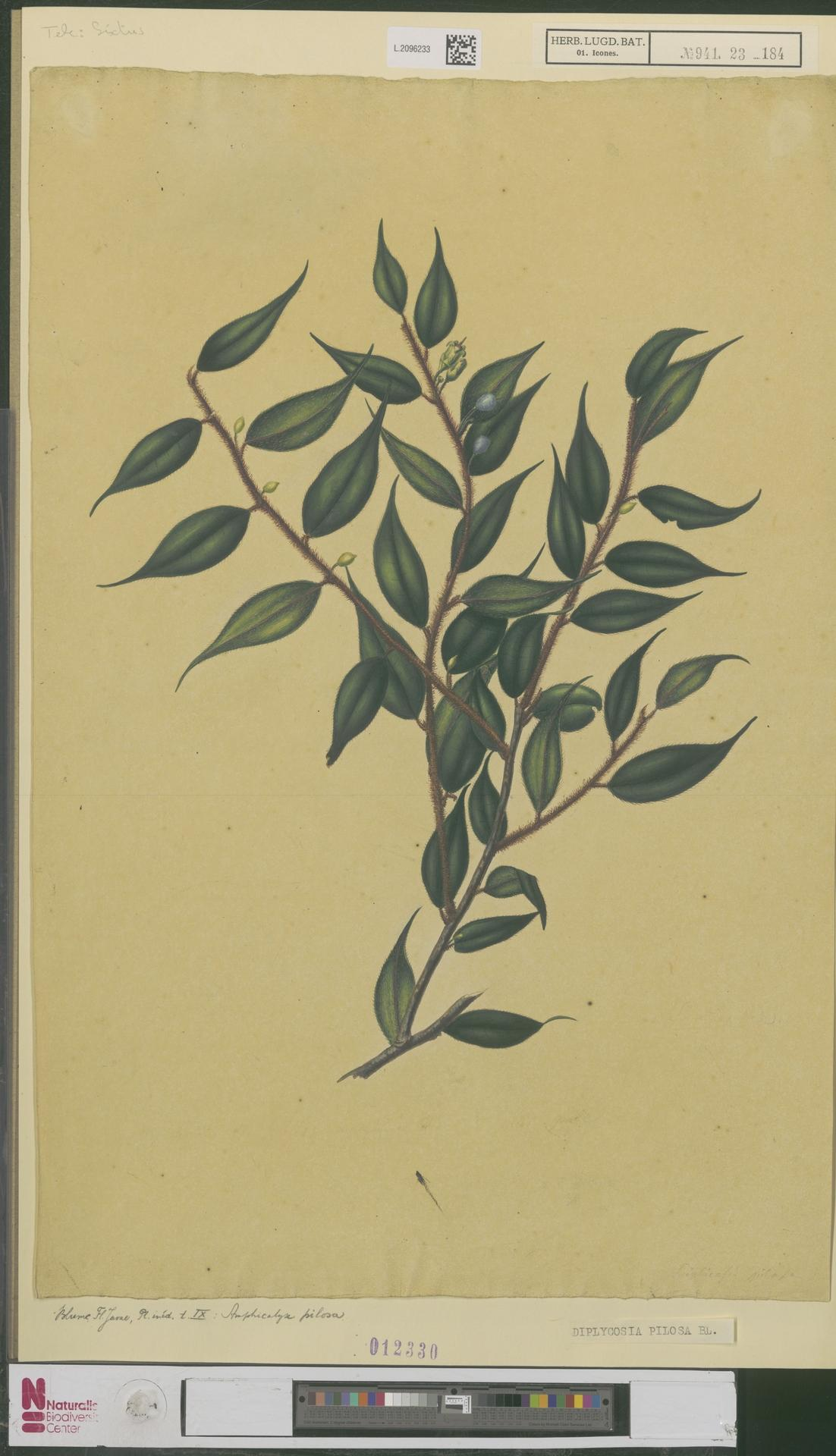
- D. pilosa

Scientific classification
- Kingdom: Plantae
- Clade: Tracheophytes
- Clade: Angiosperms
- Clade: Eudicots
- Clade: Asterids
- Order: Ericales
- Family: Ericaceae
- Genus: Diplycosia; Blume

= Diplycosia =

Genus of plants

Diplycosia is a genus of flowering plants belonging to the family Ericaceae. Plants of the World Online now treats the genus as a synonym of Gaultheria.

Its native range is Indo-China to Papuasia.

Species:

- Diplycosia abanii Argent
- Diplycosia abscondita Sleumer
- Diplycosia acuminata Becc.
- Diplycosia amboinensis Becc.
- Diplycosia annamensis Sleumer
- Diplycosia aperta J.J.Sm.
- Diplycosia apiculifera J.J.Sm.
- Diplycosia apoensis Elmer
- Diplycosia atjehensis Sleumer
- Diplycosia aurea Sleumer
- Diplycosia balgooyi Argent
- Diplycosia barbigera Sleumer
- Diplycosia bartolomei Ferreras & Argent
- Diplycosia benitotanii Argent
- Diplycosia brachyantha Sleumer
- Diplycosia capitata Sleumer
- Diplycosia carrii Sleumer
- Diplycosia caryophylloides J.J.Sm.
- Diplycosia caudatifolia Sleumer
- Diplycosia celebensis J.J.Sm.
- Diplycosia chrysothrix Stapf
- Diplycosia ciliolata Hook.f.
- Diplycosia cinnabarina Sleumer
- Diplycosia cinnamomifolia Stapf
- Diplycosia clementium Sleumer
- Diplycosia coi Argent
- Diplycosia commutata Sleumer
- Diplycosia consobrina Becc.
- Diplycosia crenulata Sleumer
- Diplycosia edulis Schltr.
- Diplycosia ensifolia Merr.
- Diplycosia epiphytica Fletcher
- Diplycosia filipes Sleumer
- Diplycosia fimbriata Sleumer
- Diplycosia gallowayana Argent
- Diplycosia glaucicaulis Argent
- Diplycosia glauciflora Sleumer
- Diplycosia gracilipes J.J.Sm.
- Diplycosia haemantha Sleumer
- Diplycosia hendrianiana Argent
- Diplycosia heterophylla Blume
- Diplycosia hirsuta Sleumer
- Diplycosia hirtiflora Argent
- Diplycosia kalimantanensis P.Wilkie & Argent
- Diplycosia kalmiifolia Sleumer
- Diplycosia kemulensis J.J.Sm.
- Diplycosia kinabaluensis Stapf
- Diplycosia kjellbergii J.J.Sm.
- Diplycosia kosteri Sleumer
- Diplycosia kostermansii Sleumer
- Diplycosia lamiij J.J.Sm.
- Diplycosia lancifolia Ridl.
- Diplycosia lavandulifolia Sleumer
- Diplycosia ledermannii Schltr.
- Diplycosia lilianae J.J.Sm.
- Diplycosia lohieri Merr.
- Diplycosia lorentzii Koord.
- Diplycosia lotungensis Argent
- Diplycosia luzonica (A.Gray) Merr.
- Diplycosia lysolepis Sleumer
- Diplycosia malayana (King & Gamble) Argent
- Diplycosia mantorii Argent
- Diplycosia megabracteata (Argent) Argent
- Diplycosia mekonggaensis Argent & Widjaja
- Diplycosia memecyloides Stapf
- Diplycosia microphylla (Reinw. ex Blume) Becc.
- Diplycosia microsalicifolia Argent
- Diplycosia minutiflora Sleumer
- Diplycosia mogeana Argent
- Diplycosia morobeensis Sleumer
- Diplycosia muscicola Sleumer
- Diplycosia myrtillus Stapf
- Diplycosia ngii Argent
- Diplycosia orophila Sleumer
- Diplycosia othmanii Argent
- Diplycosia parvifolia Merr.
- Diplycosia paulsmithii Argent
- Diplycosia pendens Sleumer
- Diplycosia penduliflora Stapf
- Diplycosia piceifolia Sleumer
- Diplycosia pilosa Blume
- Diplycosia pinifolia Stapf
- Diplycosia pittosporifolia J.J.Sm.
- Diplycosia platyphylla P.W.Fritsch
- Diplycosia pseudorufescens Sleumer
- Diplycosia pubivertex Sleumer
- Diplycosia punctulata Stapf
- Diplycosia puradyatmikai
- Diplycosia retusa Sleumer
- Diplycosia rhombica Argent
- Diplycosia rigidifolia P.W.Fritsch & C.M.Bush
- Diplycosia rosea Sleumer
- Diplycosia rosmarinifolia Sleumer
- Diplycosia rubella Sleumer
- Diplycosia rubidiflora J.J.Sm.
- Diplycosia rufa Stapf
- Diplycosia rufescens Schltr.
- Diplycosia rupicola Sleumer
- Diplycosia sagittanthera J.J.Sm.
- Diplycosia salicifolia Sleumer
- Diplycosia sanguinolenta Sleumer
- Diplycosia saurauioides J.J.Sm.
- Diplycosia scabrida Becc.
- Diplycosia schramii Sleumer
- Diplycosia schultzei Schltr.
- Diplycosia setiloba Sleumer
- Diplycosia setosa J.J.Sm.
- Diplycosia soror Becc.
- Diplycosia sphenophylla Sleumer
- Diplycosia stellaris Sleumer
- Diplycosia stenophylla Sleumer
- Diplycosia subglobularis Sleumer
- Diplycosia sumatrensis Merr.
- Diplycosia supyanii Argent
- Diplycosia tetramera Sleumer
- Diplycosia triangulanthera J.J.Sm.
- Diplycosia trinervia Elmer
- Diplycosia undata J.J.Sm.
- Diplycosia urceolata Stapf
- Diplycosia varians Sleumer
- Diplycosia viridiflora Sleumer
