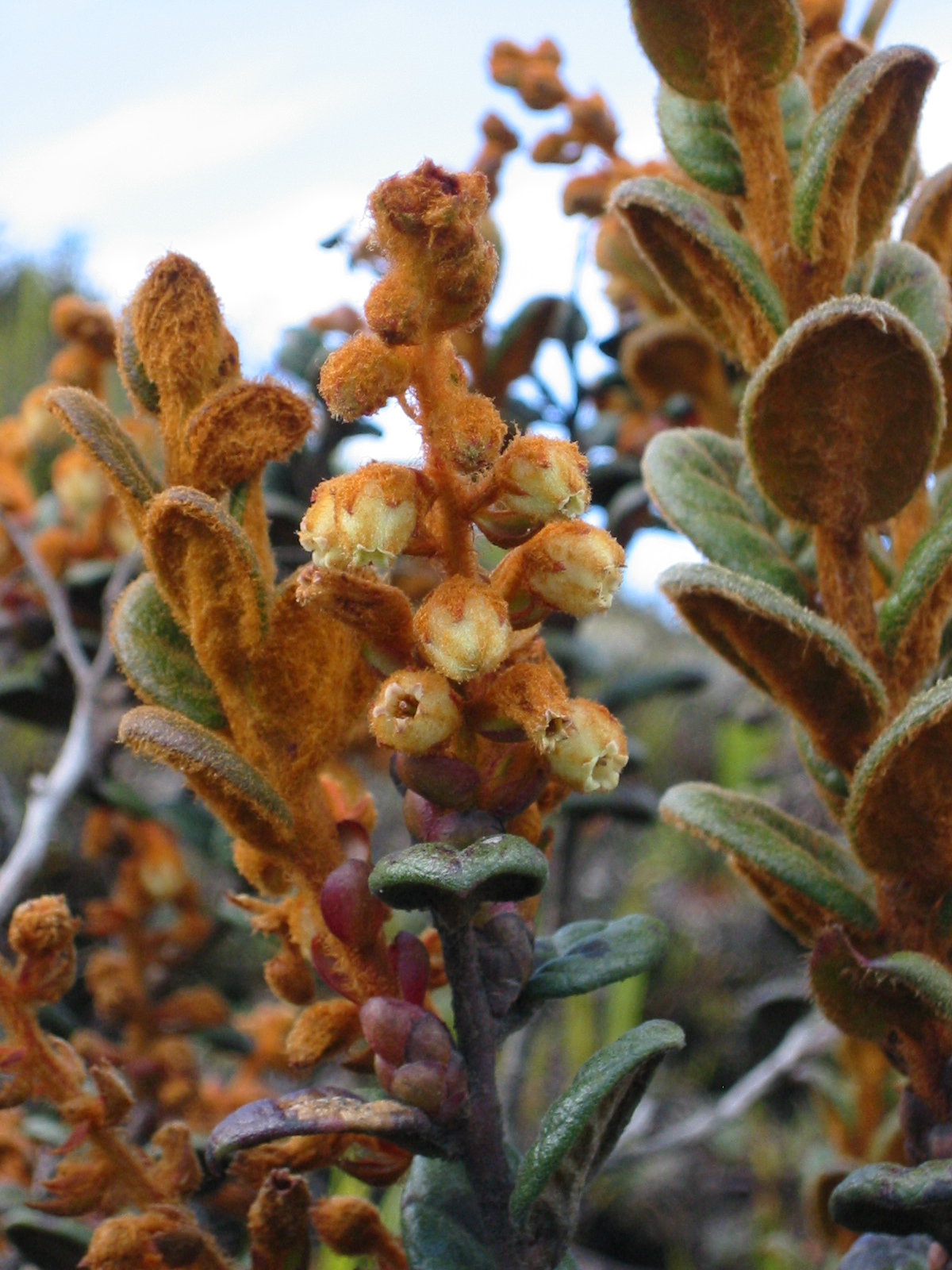
- Gaultheria lanigera var. lanigera near Cuenca, Ecuador

Scientific classification
- Kingdom: Plantae
- Clade: Tracheophytes
- Clade: Angiosperms
- Clade: Eudicots
- Clade: Asterids
- Order: Ericales
- Family: Ericaceae
- Genus: Gaultheria
- Species: G. lanigera

Binomial name
- Gaultheria lanigera Hook.f.

= Gaultheria lanigera =

Species of flowering plant

Gaultheria lanigera is a species of Gaultheria, native to the Andes in Colombia and Ecuador. It is an evergreen shrub, confined to high altitudes.

There are two varieties:

- Gaultheria lanigera var. lanigera. Recorded from Ecuador.
- Gaultheria lanigera var. rufolanata (Sleumer) Luteyn. Recorded from Colombia.
