= Gaultheria nummularioides =

Scientific classification
- Kingdom: Plantae
- Clade: Tracheophytes
- Clade: Angiosperms
- Clade: Eudicots
- Clade: Asterids
- Order: Ericales
- Family: Ericaceae
- Genus: Gaultheria
- Species: G. nummularioides

Binomial name
- Gaultheria nummularioides D.Don

Varieties
- G. n. var. nummularioides; G. n. var. microphylla

Species of flowering plant

Gaultheria nummularioides is a species of plant in the family Ericaceae. It is distributed across India, Myanmar, Nepal, Bhutan, Indonesia, and Southwest China (Tibet, Yunnan, and Sichuan). The plant grows in areas between 1,700 and 3,000 m (5,600 and 9,800 ft) above sea level, and grows better on rocky mountainsides and weed tree forests. This species has been cultivated as an ornamental in Britain, the United States, and elsewhere for some decades.

== Synonyms ==
- Gaultheria nummularioides D.Don var. microphylla C.Y.Wu et T.Z.Hsu
