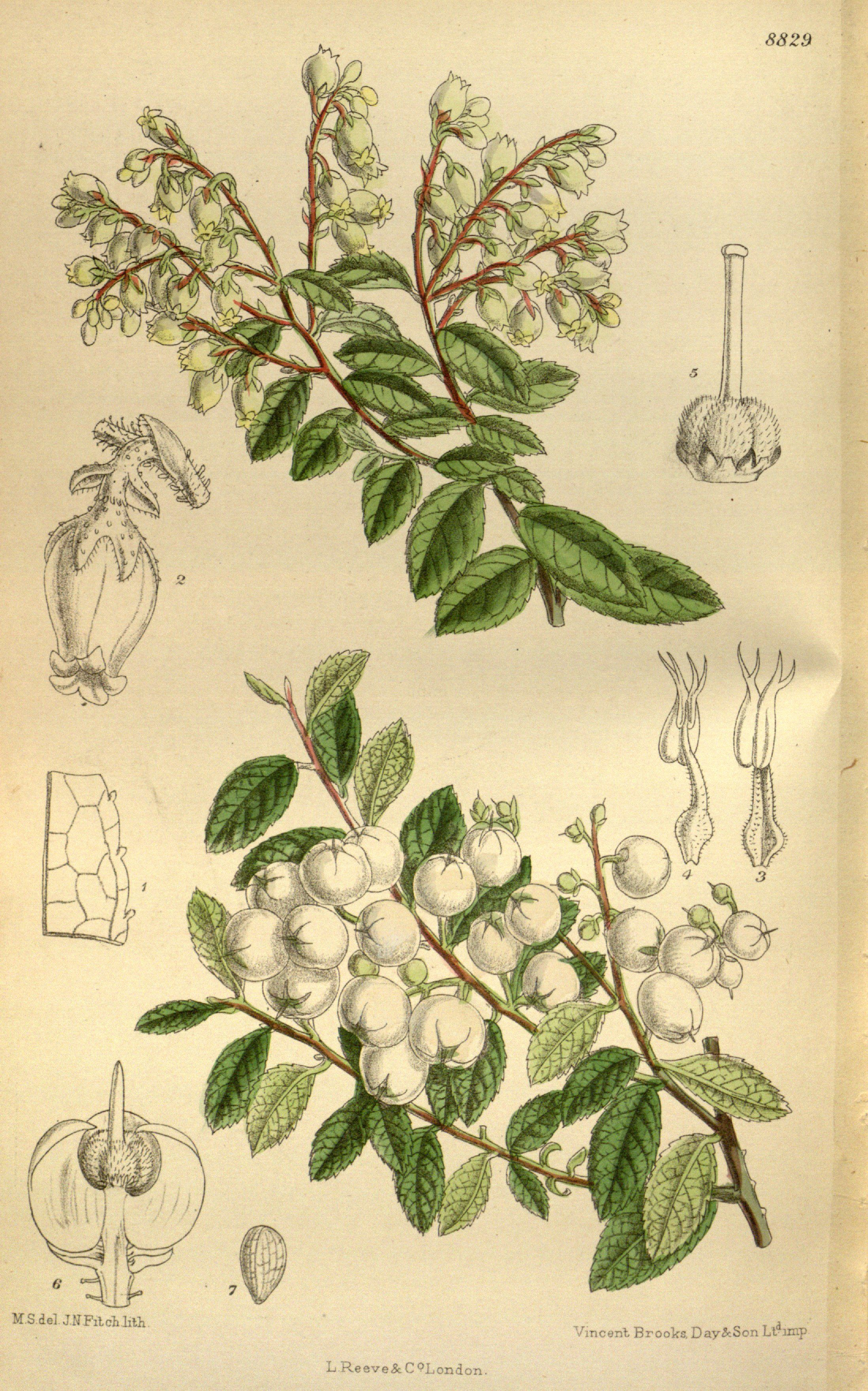
- G. cuneata (Curtis's Botanical Magazine, London., vol. 145 )

Scientific classification
- Kingdom: Plantae
- Clade: Tracheophytes
- Clade: Angiosperms
- Clade: Eudicots
- Clade: Asterids
- Order: Ericales
- Family: Ericaceae
- Genus: Gaultheria
- Species: G. cuneata

Binomial name
- Gaultheria cuneata Bean

= Gaultheria cuneata =

Species of flowering plant

Gaultheria cuneata is a species of flowering plant in the family Ericaceae, native to western China. It is a densely branched, dwarf, evergreen shrub growing to 30 cm (12 in) tall by 100 cm (39 in) wide, with narrow glossy green leaves and white flowers in spring followed by white berries 1 cm in diameter in autumn. Like others of its family, it is a calcifuge, preferring an acid peaty soil. In cultivation it is used as groundcover for underplanting larger shrubs.
