= Gaultheria trichophylla =

Himalayan snowberry

Scientific classification
- Kingdom: Plantae
- Clade: Tracheophytes
- Clade: Angiosperms
- Clade: Eudicots
- Clade: Asterids
- Order: Ericales
- Family: Ericaceae
- Genus: Gaultheria
- Species: G. trichophylla

Binomial name
- Gaultheria trichophylla Royle

Species of flowering plant

Gaultheria trichophylla, commonly known as Himalayan snowberry, is a species of plant in the heath and heather family, native to the Himalayas. The flowers range in color from red, to pink, to white; fruits are blue-colored berries; and leaves are approximately 3 mm (0.12 in) in length.

In volume one of his book Illustrations of the Botany and Other Branches of the Natural History of the Himalayan Mountains, and of the Flora of Cashmere, J. Forbes Royle wrote this about the natural habitat of G. trichophylla: "This plant is an inhabitant of cold and lofty situations, as Jumnotri, the top of Choor, and of the mountains surrounding Cashmere, and like many plants of such situations is furnished with setae on the younger upper parts of branches, probably to protect them from the severity of the cold. The calyx is adherent to the lower part of the capsule, becomes succulent, and forms an edible fruit in the month of September."
