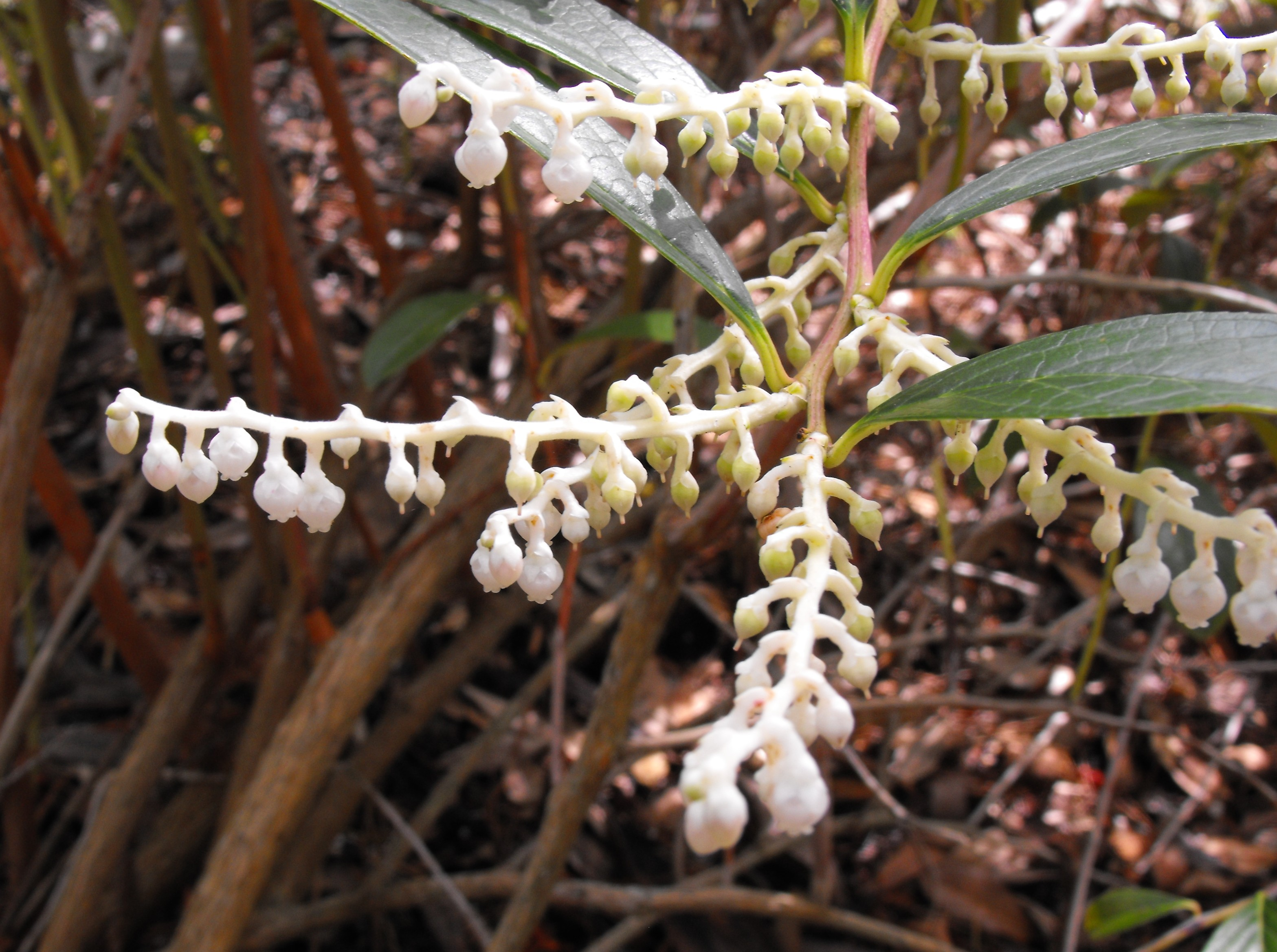

Conservation status
- Least Concern (IUCN 3.1)

Scientific classification
- Kingdom: Plantae
- Clade: Embryophytes
- Clade: Tracheophytes
- Clade: Angiosperms
- Clade: Eudicots
- Clade: Asterids
- Order: Ericales
- Family: Ericaceae
- Genus: Gaultheria
- Species: G. fragrantissima

Binomial name
- Gaultheria fragrantissima Wall.

Synonyms
- Brossaea fragrantissima (Wall.) Kuntze

= Gaultheria fragrantissima =

Species of flowering plant

Gaultheria fragrantissima is a species of flowering plant native to southern and southeastern Asia. It is commonly known as fragrant wintergreen or dhasingre.

== Description ==
Gaultheria fragrantissima is a shrub or small tree. The flowering period of the plant extends from April to May.

The form of the plant and the size and shape of its leaves can vary considerably based on its habitat. In forest understoreys and at forest margins it is typically a large shrub or small tree with large leaves. In drier and sunnier conditions, like exposed slopes and thickets, it is a small narrow-leaved shrub.

== Distribution and habitat ==
Gaultheria fragrantissima ranges from India and Sri Lanka through Nepal, Tibet, and the Himlalayas to south-central China, and to Vietnam, Myanmar, Peninsular Malaysia, Sumatra, Java, and Bali.

Gaultheria fragrantissima is native to montane tropical and subtropical forests from 1,375 to 2,650 metres elevation. It can be found in a variety of conditions, including in the understorey of mature forests and at forest margins on humus-rich moist soils, as well as on drier and exposed slopes among other shrubs.

== Subspecies ==
Three subspecies are recognized:

- Gaultheria fragrantissima subsp. fragrantissima – India and Sri Lanka to south-central China, Myanmar, and Peninsular Malaysia. Synonyms include Gaultheria forrestii Diels, Gaultheria fragrans D.Don, Gaultheria hirsuta Gardner ex C.B.Clarke, Gaultheria leschenaultii DC., Gaultheria ovalifolia Wall., and Gaultheria rudis Stapf.
- Gaultheria fragrantissima var. obovata S.Panda & Sanjappa – south Western Ghats of Tamil Nadu in southern India.
- Gaultheria fragrantissima subsp. punctata (Blume) Steenis – Sumatra, Java, and Bali. Gaultheria punctata Blume is a synonym.

== Uses ==
An essential oil is derived from the leaves of the plant. The aromatic oil has a wintergreen aroma and is used in perfumery, as a hair oil, and medicinally. It is used topically to treat rheumatism, scabies, and neuralgia, and taken internally to treat hookworm.

G. fragrantissima subsp. fragrantissima is used as a medicinal plant in Ayurveda. The plant is known as "Wel kapuru - වල් කපුරු" or "Wel kapuru - වෙල් කපුරු" by Sinhalese people.
