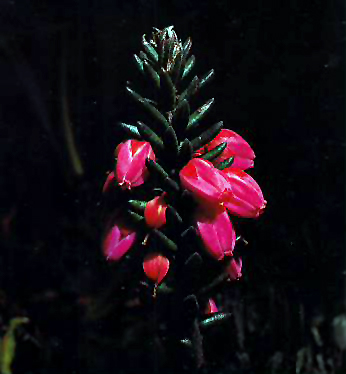

Scientific classification
- Kingdom: Plantae
- Clade: Tracheophytes
- Clade: Angiosperms
- Clade: Eudicots
- Clade: Asterids
- Order: Ericales
- Family: Ericaceae
- Genus: Gaultheria
- Species: G. floribunda

Binomial name
- Gaultheria floribunda (Camp) ined.

Synonyms
- Gaultheria empetrifolia Kron & P.W.Fritsch (2020); Tepuia floribunda Camp (1939); Tepuia venusta Camp (1939)

= Gaultheria floribunda =

Species of plant

Gaultheria floribunda is a species of plant in the heath family (Ericaceae). It is endemic to the tepuis of southern Venezuela.
