= Wintergreen =

Small shrub in the Heath family

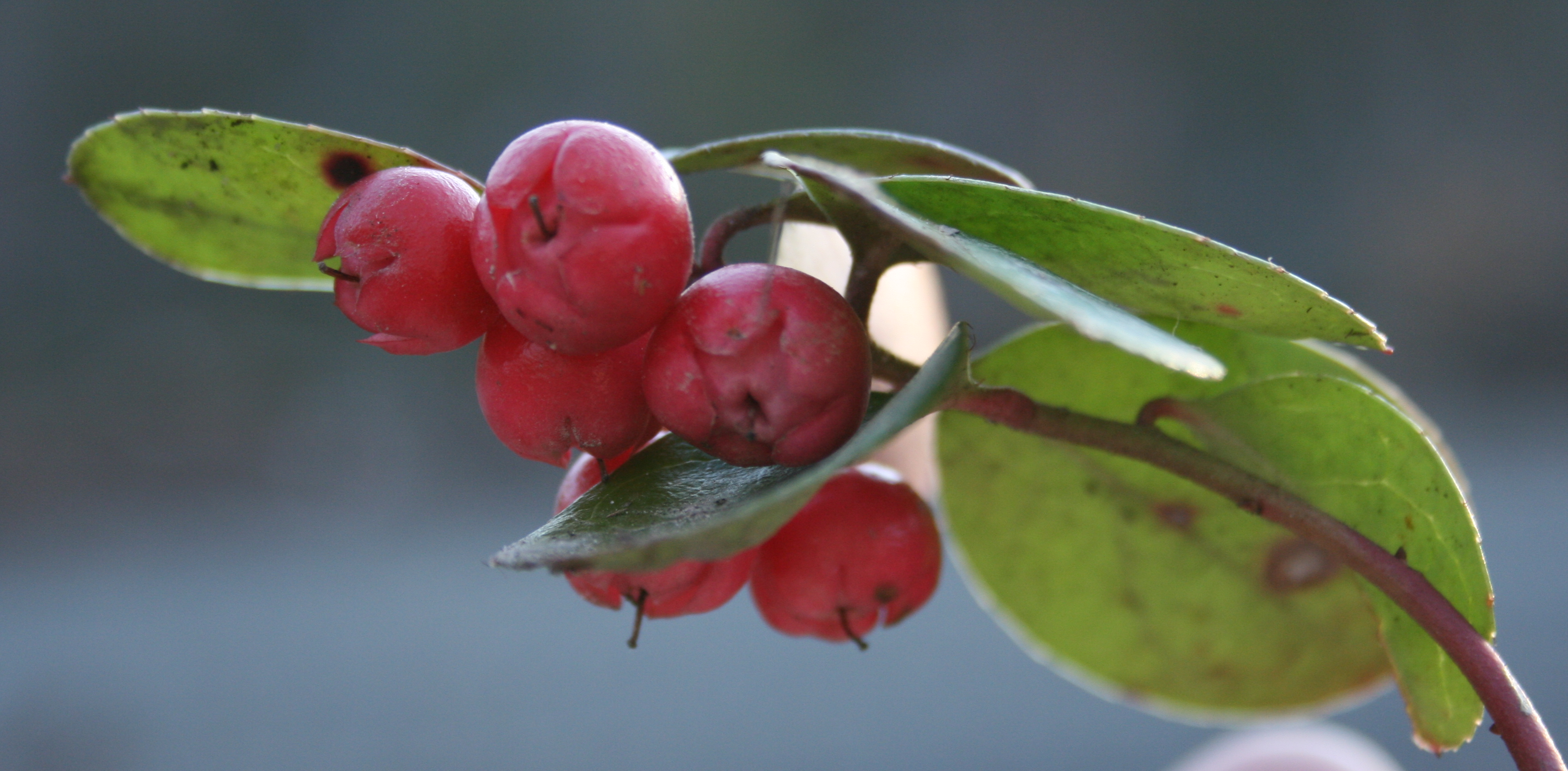
Gaultheria from Fountain Springs, Pennsylvania

Wintergreen is a group of aromatic plants. The term wintergreen once commonly referred to plants that remain green (continue photosynthesis) throughout the winter. The term evergreen is now more commonly used for this characteristic.

Most species of the shrub genus Gaultheria demonstrate this characteristic and are called wintergreens in North America, the most common generally being the American wintergreen (Gaultheria procumbens). Wintergreens in the genus Gaultheria contain an aromatic compound, methyl salicylate, and are used as a mintlike flavoring.

== Uses ==
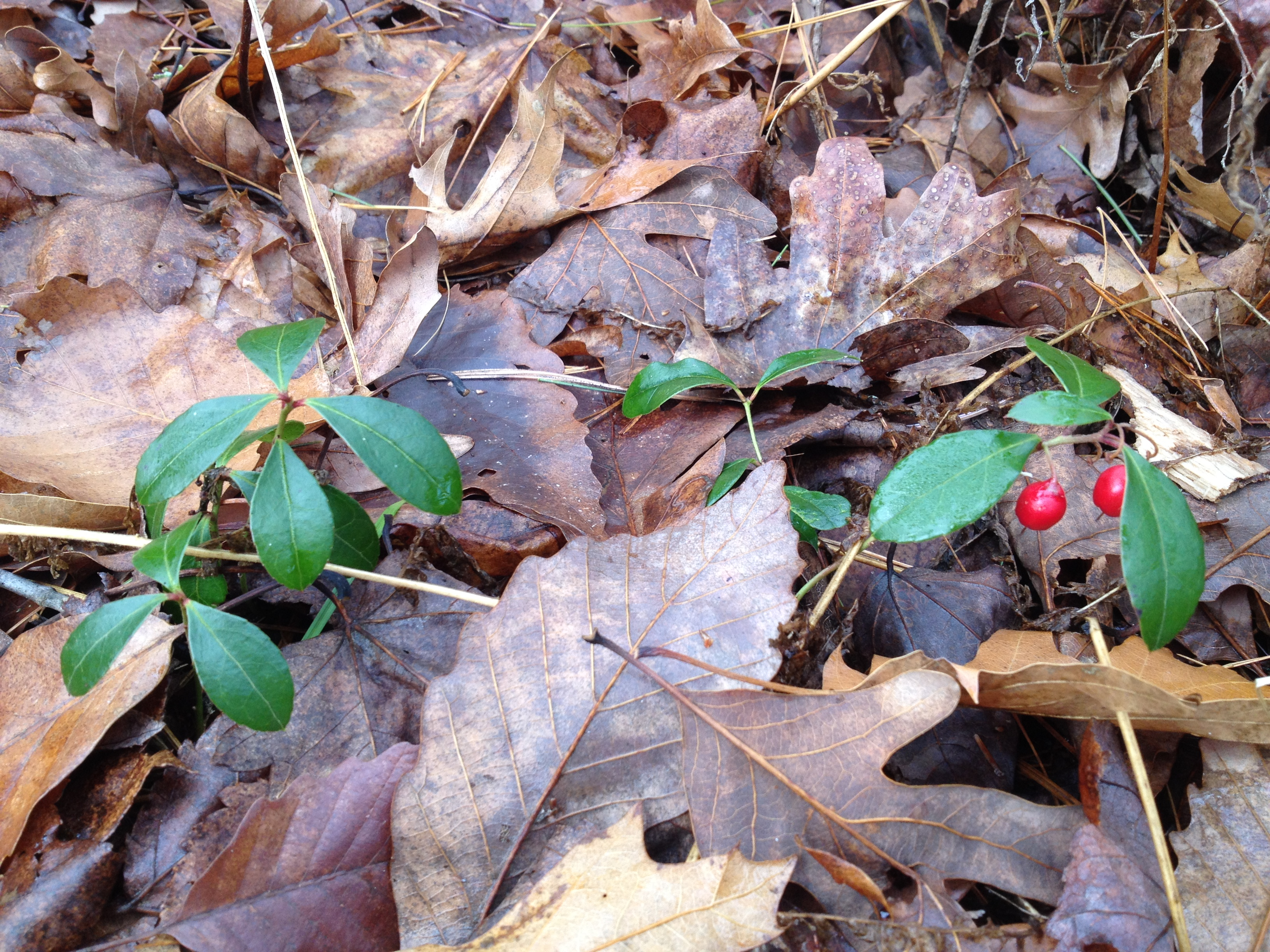
Wintergreen from Greeley, Pennsylvania; early December

The berries of most species can be eaten raw or used in pies.

Wintergreen is a common flavoring in American products ranging from chewing gum, mints, and candies to smokeless tobacco such as dipping tobacco (American "dip" snuff) and snus. It is a common flavoring for dental hygiene products such as mouthwash and toothpaste. It is often a component of root beer, which originated in the United States.

Wintergreen oil is an ingredient in some vegetable-oil based lubricants used in firearm maintenance. These products, sold under the names Seal1 and Frog Lube, are proprietary blends of vegetable oils intended to clean, lubricate and preserve the metal surfaces of firearms. They have the advantages over petroleum-based products of being non-toxic and biodegradable.

Artificial wintergreen oil, which is pure methyl salicylate, is used in microscopy because of its high refractive index. Natural wintergreen oil can be distinguished from artificial by gas chromatography (GC) and GC isotope ratio mass spectrometry analysis.

== Oil ==
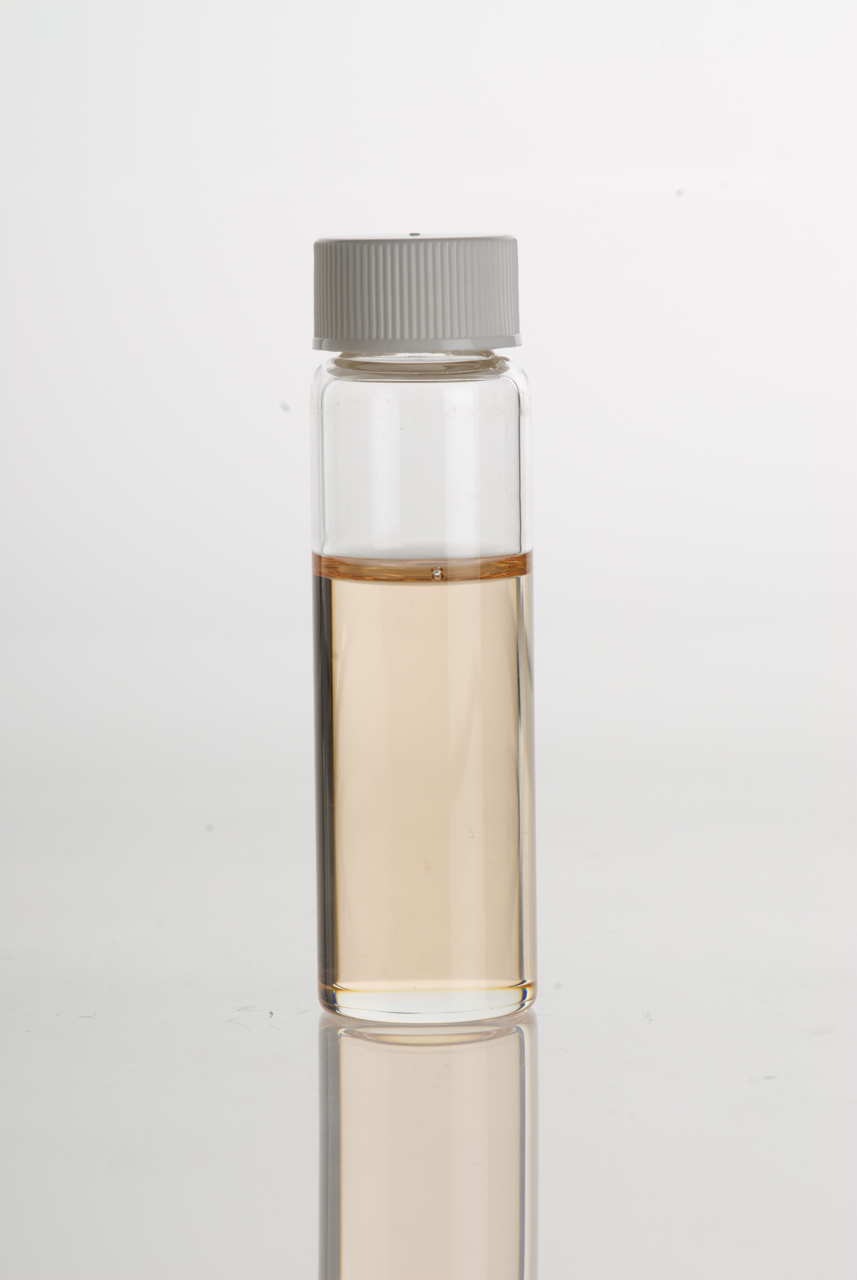
Wintergreen (Gaultheria procumbens) essential oil

The Gaultheria species share the common characteristic of producing oil of wintergreen. Wintergreen oil is a pale yellow or pinkish fluid liquid that is strongly minty aromatic described as "fresh, sweet, and characteristically wintergreen" (components: methyl salicylate (about 98%), α-pinene, myrcene, delta-3-carene, limonene, 3,7-guaiadiene, and delta-cadinene) that gives such plants a distinctive "medicinal" smell whenever bruised. Salicylate sensitivity is a common adverse reaction to the methyl salicylate in oil of wintergreen; it can produce allergy-like symptoms or asthma.

Wintergreen essential oil is usually obtained by steam distillation of the leaves of the plant following maceration in warm water. Methyl salicylate is not present in the plant until formed by enzymatic action from a glycoside within the leaves as they are macerated in warm water. Oil of wintergreen is also manufactured from some species of birch, but these deciduous trees are not called wintergreens. Spiraea plants also contain methyl salicylate in large amounts and are used similarly to wintergreen. Wintergreen has a strong minty odor and flavor; however the Gaultheria-genus plants are not true mints, which belong to the genus Mentha.

Wintergreen also is used in some perfumery applications and as a flavoring agent for toothpaste, chewing gum, soft drinks, confectionery, Listerine and mint flavorings. Wintergreen is used for rust removal and degreasing of machinery and is particularly effective for breaking through sea-water corrosion.

== Toxicity of oil ==
One milliliter (20 drops) of wintergreen oil is equivalent to about 1860 mg of aspirin, or almost six regular-strength adult aspirin tablets.

Treatment is identical to the other salicylates. Early use of hemodialysis in conjunction with maximal supportive measures is encouraged in any significant ingestion of methyl salicylate.

== See also ==
- Gaultheria humifusa—alpine wintergreen
- Gaultheria procumbens—eastern teaberry, checkerberry, boxberry, or American wintergreen
- Gaultheria ovatifolia—western teaberry or Oregon spicy wintergreen
- Chimaphila maculata—striped wintergreen
- Gaultheria fragrantissima—fragrant wintergreen
