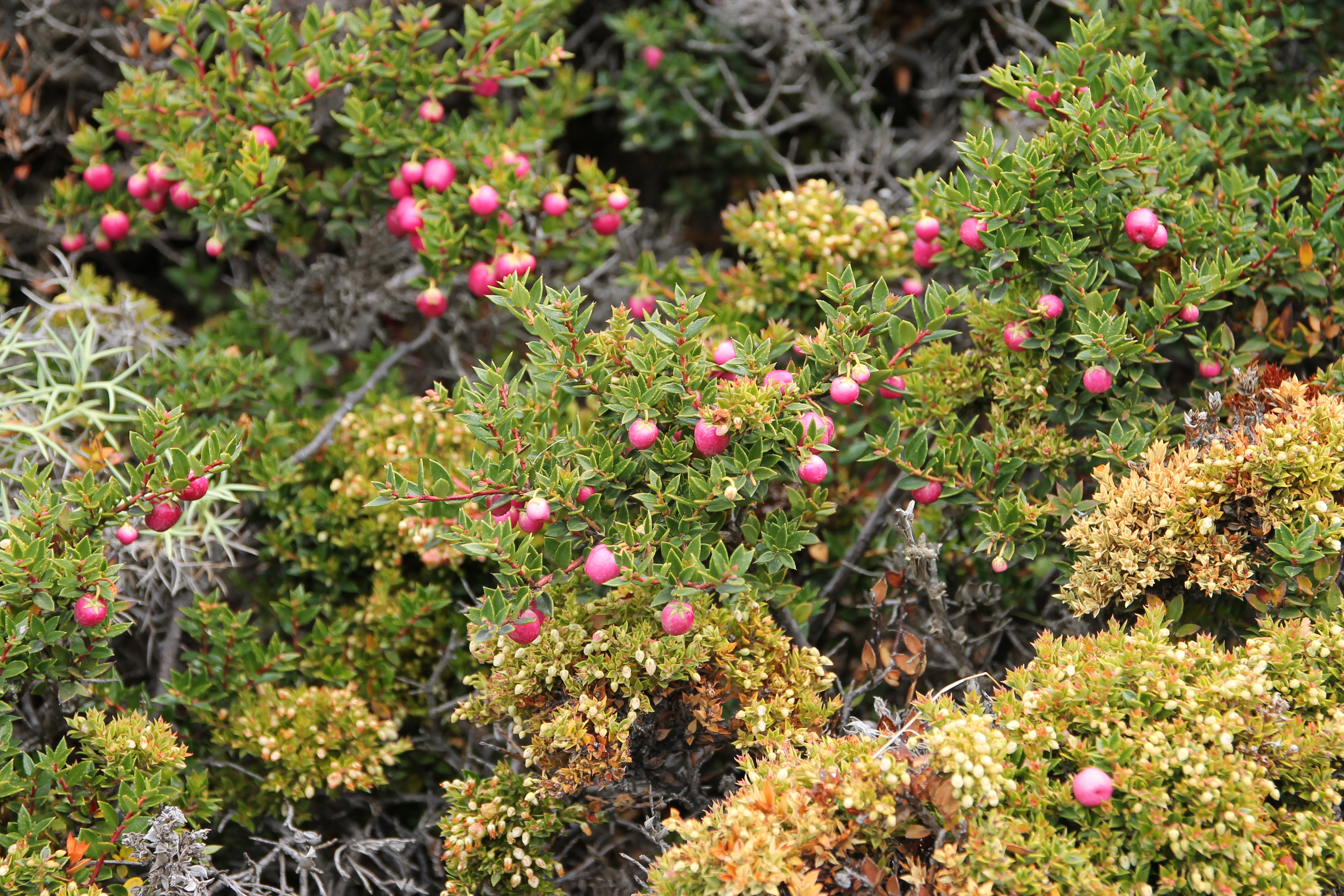
- In Torres del Paine National Park, Chile

Scientific classification
- Kingdom: Plantae
- Clade: Tracheophytes
- Clade: Angiosperms
- Clade: Eudicots
- Clade: Asterids
- Order: Ericales
- Family: Ericaceae
- Genus: Gaultheria
- Species: G. mucronata

Binomial name
- Gaultheria mucronata (L.f.) Hook. & Arn.

= Gaultheria mucronata =

Species of plant

Gaultheria mucronata (syn. Pernettya mucronata; also known as prickly heath, chaura, or murtillo) is a species of flowering plant in the family Ericaceae, native to southern Argentina and Chile.

In volcanic areas of southern Chile Gaultheria mucronata is one of the dominant plant species above the tree line.

== Description ==
It is a compact, bushy, evergreen shrub with glossy green leaves and solitary white flowers in spring, followed in autumn by showy globose berries up to 1.5 cm (0.59 in) in diameter, in shades from deep plum purple through pink to pure white. It is dioecious, meaning that both male and female plants must be grown together in order to produce fruit. It prefers moist, shaded conditions.

== Edibility ==
Its fruits are edible when ripe, hence useful as survival food. They are sweet and juicy but somewhat tasteless.

== Cultivars ==
Numerous cultivars have been selected for garden use, of which the following have gained the Royal Horticultural Society's Award of Garden Merit:-

- 'Bell's Seedling' (deep red fruit)
- 'Crimsonia' (large crimson fruits)
- 'Mulberry Wine' (purple fruit)
- 'Wintertime' (white fruits)
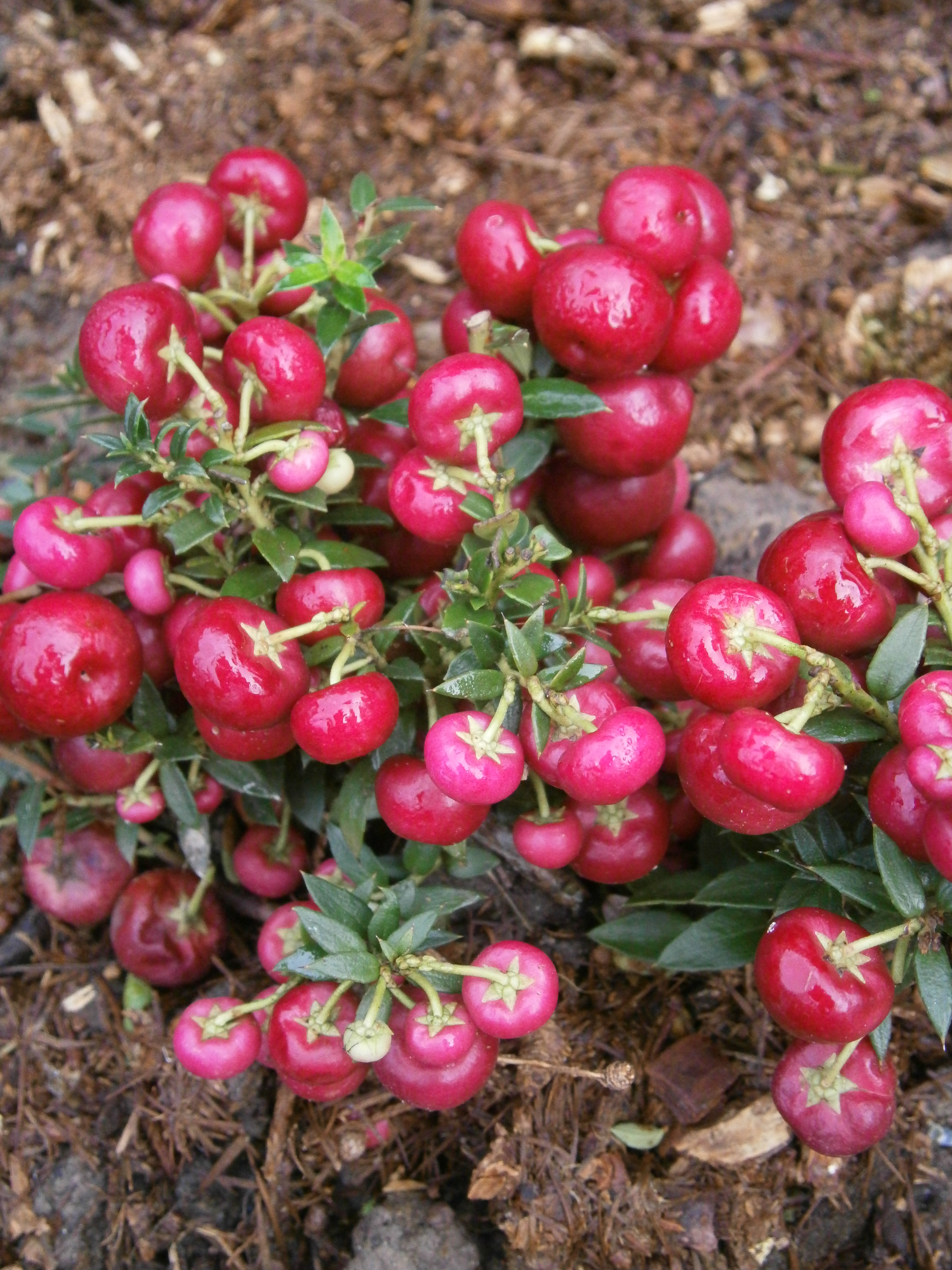
Gaultheria mucronata 'Bell's Seedling'

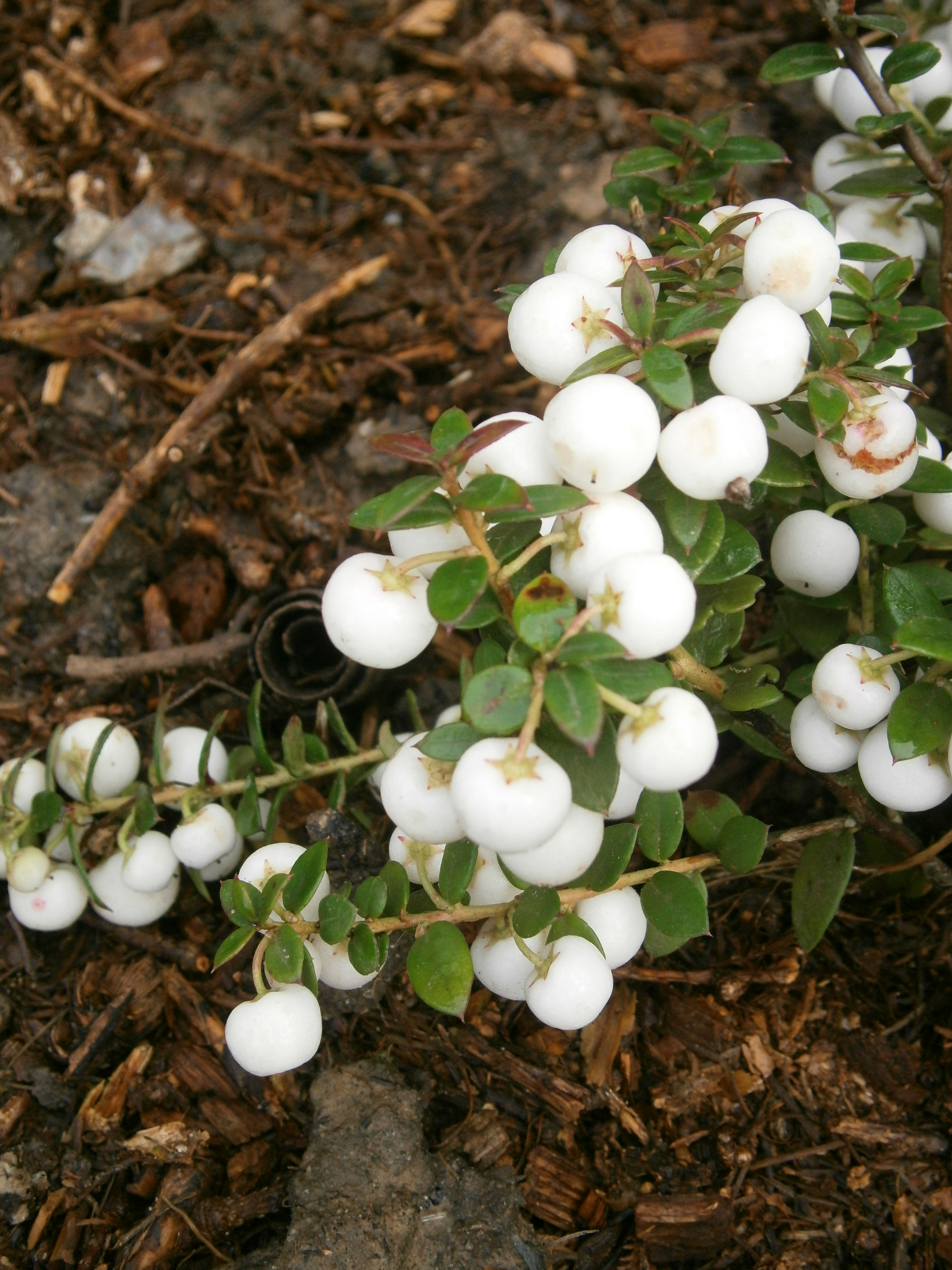
Gaultheria mucronata 'Wintertime'

== Etymology ==
Gaultheria is named for Dr. Jean François Gaulthier (1708–56), a French-Canadian botanist from Quebec.

The Latin specific epithet mucronata means “prickly”, referring to the foliage.
