= Gaultheria insipida =

Scientific classification
- Kingdom: Plantae
- Clade: Embryophytes
- Clade: Tracheophytes
- Clade: Angiosperms
- Clade: Eudicots
- Clade: Asterids
- Order: Ericales
- Family: Ericaceae
- Genus: Gaultheria
- Species: G. insipida

Binomial name
- Gaultheria insipida Benth.

Synonyms
- Brossaea insipida Kuntze

Species of flowering plant

Gaultheria insipida, also known as misijallo or chichaja, is a flowering shrub of the plant genus Gaultheria. The species is native to the Andes; specimens have been found in Colombia, Ecuador, and Peru.

This semi-hardy shrub grows to a height of 1.8–2.4 m (5.9–7.9 ft). Its long, thin branches bear bright green leaves, which may grow up to 7.6 cm (3.0 in) long. In autumn, the leaves turn a burgundy colour, and the shrub's pink flowers mature into small, white berries topped with five red spots.

Two varieties have been described: G. insipida insipida and G. insipida peruviana. James Francis Macbride found the latter in the Huánuco Region of central Peru, and published his description in 1959.

== Inga traditional medicine ==
In the Putumayo department of southwestern Colombia, the Inga people treat chronic pain and other conditions with a drink by simmering the root of the plant in water for several hours.

For myalgia (body ache), low energy/motivation, and hypersomnia, the patient drinks an infusion of chichaja. The infusion is also said to cleanse the blood and to help prevent disease. In cases of rheumatism, chronic fatigue, or hemorrhoids, the patient drinks the infusion hot.

For malaise, the patient drinks a decoction of granicillo, guayabilla (Eugenia victoriana), chichaja, azul tugtu (a Rubiaceae species), Peperomia, and chamomile three times per day.

The Ingas prepare an infusion of conejo guasca, azul tugtu, and chichaja in the belief that it promotes the purging of toxins through the sweat glands.

In Colombia, chichaja is sometimes called yagé hembra ("female ayahuasca"), whereas in Peru this nickname describes Diplopterys cabrerana.
