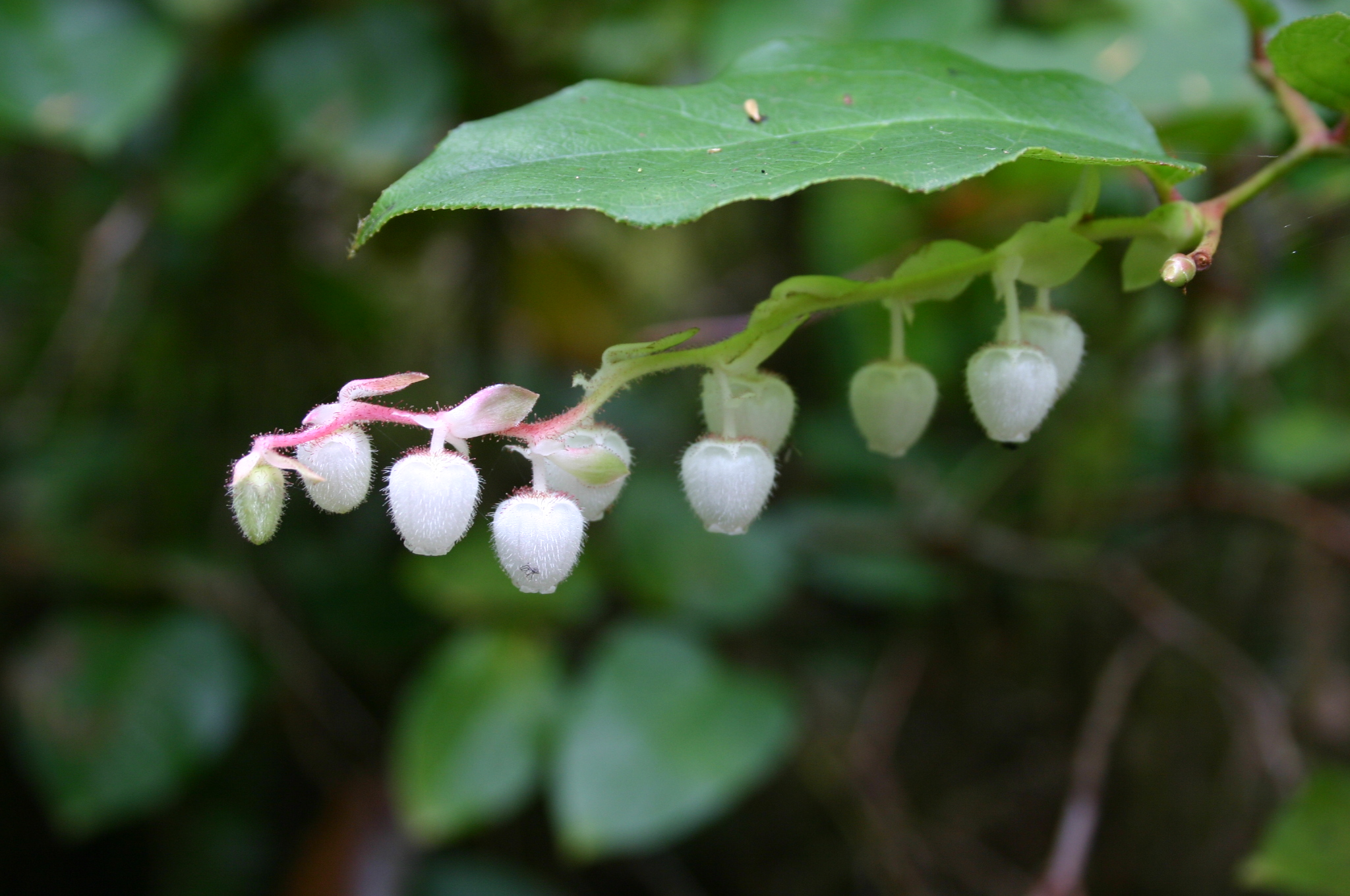
- Gaultheria shallon

Scientific classification
- Kingdom: Plantae
- Clade: Tracheophytes
- Clade: Angiosperms
- Clade: Eudicots
- Clade: Asterids
- Order: Ericales
- Family: Ericaceae
- Subfamily: Vaccinioideae
- Tribe: Gaultherieae
- Genus: Gaultheria; Kalm ex L.

Type species
- Gaultheria procumbens L.

Synonyms
- Amphicalyx Blume; Brossaea L.; Brossea Kuntze; Chiogenes Salisb. ex Torr.; Diplycosia Blume; × Gaulnettya Marchant; × Gaulthettya Camp nom. illeg.; Gautiera Raf.; Glyciphylla Raf.; Gualteria Scop.; Hippomanica Molina; Lasierpa Torr.; Pernettya Gaudich.; Pernettyopsis King & Gamble; Phalerocarpus G.Don; Shallonium Raf.; Tepuia Camp

= Gaultheria =

Genus of flowering plants

Gaultheria is a genus of about 283 species of shrubs in the family Ericaceae. The name commemorates Jean François Gaultier of Quebec, an honour bestowed by the Scandinavian Pehr Kalm in 1748 and taken up by Carl Linnaeus in his Species Plantarum. These plants are native to Asia, Australasia and North and South America. In the past, the Southern Hemisphere species were often treated as the separate genus Pernettya, but no consistent reliable morphological or genetic differences support recognition of two genera, and they are now united in the single genus Gaultheria.

== Description ==
The species vary from low, ground-hugging shrubs less than 10 cm (3.9 in) tall, up to 2.5 m (8 ft 2 in) tall, or, in the case of G. fragrantissima from the Himalayas, even a small tree up to 5–6 m (16–20 ft) tall. The leaves are evergreen, alternate (opposite in G. oppositifolia from New Zealand), simple, and vary between species from 3 to 10 cm (1.2 to 3.9 in) long; the margins are finely serrated or bristly in most species, but entire in some. The flowers are solitary or in racemes, bell-shaped, with a five-lobed (rarely four-lobed) corolla; flower colour ranges from white to pink to red. The fruit is a fleshy berry in many species, a dry capsule in some, with numerous small seeds.

== Uses ==
Several species are grown as ornamental shrubs in gardens, particularly G. mucronata (Pernettya mucronata) from southern Chile and Argentina and G. shallon (salal) from the Pacific Northwest of North America. Many of the smaller species are suitable for rock gardens. Like most other ericaceous plants, Gaultheria species do best in peaty soil that never fully dries out.

The fruit of many Gaultheria species is edible, particularly that of salal, which can be used to make jelly. One, the American wintergreen or eastern teaberry, G. procumbens, is the traditional source of wintergreen flavouring; it is called the eastern teaberry because its leaves can be used to make a tea, and its berries can be eaten without preparation. The fruit of most other Gaultheria species is insipid in flavour and not extensively consumed.

One variety of G. leucocarpa shows anti-inflammatory properties and is used in Chinese herbal medicine for the treatment of rheumatoid arthritis, swelling, and pain.

== Species ==
As of March 2023, Plants of the World Online recognises 283 species:

- Gaultheria abanii (Argent) Kron & P.W.Fritsch – Borneo (Sabah)
- Gaultheria abbreviata J.J.Sm. – northern and central Sumatra
- Gaultheria abscondita (Sleumer) Kron & P.W.Fritsch – northern Borneo
- Gaultheria acroleia Sleumer – Sumatra
- Gaultheria acuminata Schltdl. & Cham. – Mexico to Honduras
- Gaultheria adenothrix (Miq.) Maxim. – Japan
- Gaultheria akaensis S.Panda & Sanjappa – eastern Himalayas
- Gaultheria albiflora (T.Z.Hsu) P.W.Fritsch & Lu Lu – Bhutan to south-central China (Yunnan and Sichuan)
- Gaultheria alnifolia (Dunal) A.C.Sm. – northeastern Colombia to Venezuela
- Gaultheria amboinensis (Becc.) Kron & P.W.Fritsch – Maluku (Ambon)
- Gaultheria amoena A.C.Sm. – southern Colombia to Ecuador
- Gaultheria anastomosans (Mutis ex L.f.) Kunth – Colombia to northwestern Venezuela
- Gaultheria angustifolia Brandegee – central Mexico (Puebla, México, Michoacán, and Jalisco)
- Gaultheria annamensis (Sleumer) Kron & P.W.Fritsch – southern Vietnam
- Gaultheria antarctica Hook.f. – southern Chile, southern Argentina, Falkland Islands
- Gaultheria antipoda G.Forst. - snowberry or fools beech – New Zealand
- Gaultheria aperta (J.J.Sm.) Kron & P.W.Fritsch – southwestern Sulawesi
- Gaultheria apiculifera (J.J.Sm.) Kron & P.W.Fritsch – west-central Sumatra
- Gaultheria apoensis (Elmer) Kron & P.W.Fritsch – Philippines (Mindanao)
- Gaultheria appressa A.W.Hill - waxberry or white waxberry – southeastern Australia
- Gaultheria arfakana Sleumer – northwestern New Guinea
- Gaultheria argentii Kron & P.W.Fritsch – northern Borneo
- Gaultheria atjehensis J.J.Sm. – northern Sumatra
- Gaultheria aurea (Sleumer) Kron & P.W.Fritsch – northern Borneo
- Gaultheria auyantepuiensis Kron & P.W.Fritsch – Venezuela (Bolívar)
- Gaultheria balgooyi (Argent) Kron & P.W.Fritsch – Sulawesi
- Gaultheria barbigera (Sleumer) Kron & P.W.Fritsch – Borneo (Sarawak)
- Gaultheria barbulata Sleumer – Sumatra (Mount Leuser)
- Gaultheria bartolomei (Ferreras & Argent) Kron & P.W.Fritsch – Philippines
- Gaultheria beamanii Kron & P.W.Fritsch – northern Borneo
- Gaultheria beccarii Kron & P.W.Fritsch – Borneo
- Gaultheria benitotanii (Argent) Kron & P.W.Fritsch – Philippines
- Gaultheria benomensis Kron & P.W.Fritsch – Peninsular Malaysia (Pahang)
- Gaultheria berberidifolia Sleumer – New Guinea (Arfak Mountains)
- Gaultheria × biluoensis P.W.Fritsch & Lu Lu – G. crassifolia × G. major – China (Yunnan)
- Gaultheria borneensis Stapf – Taiwan, Philippines, northern Borneo
- Gaultheria brachyantha (Sleumer) Kron & P.W.Fritsch – northern Sumatra
- Gaultheria bracteata (Cav.) G.Don – Ecuador (Tungurahua) to Bolivia
- Gaultheria bradeana Sleumer – Brazil (Minas Gerais, Rio de Janeiro, and Santa Catarina)
- Gaultheria brevistipes (C.Y.Wu & T.Z.Hsu) R.C.Fang – Arunachal Pradesh to southeastern Tibet
- Gaultheria bryoides P.W.Fritsch & L.H.Zhou – China (Yunnan) to northern Myanmar
- Gaultheria buxifolia Willd. – Colombia and Venezuela
- Gaultheria caespitosa Poepp. & Endl. – central and southern Chile, southern Argentina
- Gaultheria campii Kron & P.W.Fritsch – Venezuela (Bolívar)
- Gaultheria capitata (Sleumer) Kron & P.W.Fritsch – Sulawesi
- Gaultheria cardiosepala Hand.-Mazz. – China (western Yunnan) to northern Myanmar
- Gaultheria cardonae (A.C.Sm.) Kron & P.W.Fritsch – Venezuela (Bolívar)
- Gaultheria carrii (Sleumer) Kron & P.W.Fritsch – northern Borneo
- Gaultheria caryophylloides (J.J.Sm.) Kron & P.W.Fritsch – southeastern Sulawesi
- Gaultheria caudatifolia (Sleumer) Kron & P.W.Fritsch – northern Borneo
- Gaultheria celebensis (J.J.Sm.) Kron & P.W.Fritsch – central Sulawesi
- Gaultheria celebica J.J.Sm. – central Sulawesi (Mt. Sinadji)
- Gaultheria chiriquensis Camp – Panama (Volcán Barú)
- Gaultheria ciliisepala Airy Shaw ex P.W.Fritsch & Lu Lu – Tibet to China (Yunnan) and northern Myanmar
- Gaultheria ciliolata (Hook.f.) F.Muell. – northern Borneo
- Gaultheria cinnabarina (Sleumer) Kron & P.W.Fritsch – Sumatra
- Gaultheria cinnamomifolia (Stapf) Kron & P.W.Fritsch – northern Borneo
- Gaultheria clementium (Sleumer) Kron & P.W.Fritsch – northern Borneo
- Gaultheria codonantha Airy Shaw – Arunachal Pradesh and southeastern Tibet
- Gaultheria coi (Argent) Kron & P.W.Fritsch – Philippines (Mindoro)
- Gaultheria colensoi Hook.f. – New Zealand (North Island)
- Gaultheria commutata (Sleumer) Kron & P.W.Fritsch – northern Borneo
- Gaultheria consobrina (Becc.) Kron & P.W.Fritsch – Borneo (southwestern Sarawak)
- Gaultheria corvensis (R.R.Silva & Cervi) Romão & Kin.-Gouv. – Brazil (Santa Catarina)
- Gaultheria crassa Allan – New Zealand
- Gaultheria crassifolia (Airy Shaw) P.W.Fritsch & Lu Lu – Tibet to China (Yunnan) and northern Myanmar
- Gaultheria cuneata (Rehder & E.H.Wilson) Bean – Nepal and China (western Sichuan and northern Yunnan)
- Gaultheria depressa Hook.f. - mountain snow berry or alpine wax berry – Tasmania and New Zealand
- Gaultheria dialypetala Sleumer – central-western Sumatra (Mount Talakmau)
- Gaultheria discolor Nutt. ex Hook. – Bhutan and eastern Himalayas to China (western and southeastern Yunnan)
- Gaultheria dolichopoda Airy Shaw – Arunachal Pradesh to China (Yunnan) and northern Myanmar
- Gaultheria domingensis Urb. – Hispaniola and Lesser Antilles
- Gaultheria dumicola W.W.Sm. – Arunachal Pradesh to China (western Yunnan)
- Gaultheria eciliata (Rae & D.G.Long) P.W.Fritsch & L.H.Zhou - Eastern Himalayas to China (northwestern Yunnan)
- Gaultheria edulis (Schltr.) Kron & P.W.Fritsch – western New Guinea
- Gaultheria ensifolia (Merr.) Kron & P.W.Fritsch – northern Borneo
- Gaultheria epiphytica (H.R.Fletcher) Kron & P.W.Fritsch – Peninsular Thailand
- Gaultheria erecta Vent. – Mexico to northwestern Argentina and southern Brazil
- Gaultheria eriophylla (Pers.) Mart. ex Sleumer eastern Brazil
- Gaultheria eymae Kron & P.W.Fritsch – central Sulawesi
- Gaultheria × fagifolia Hook.f. – New Zealand (North Island)
- Gaultheria filipes (Sleumer) Kron & P.W.Fritsch – central Sulawesi
- Gaultheria fimbriata (Sleumer) Kron & P.W.Fritsch – Borneo (Gunung Mulu in Sarawak)
- Gaultheria floribunda (Camp) ined. – Venezuela (Bolívar)
- Gaultheria foliolosa Benth. – Colombia, Ecuador, and Peru
- Gaultheria fragrantissima Wall. – India, Tibet, south-central China, Myanmar, Vietnam, Peninsular Malaysia, Sumatra, and Java
- Gaultheria gajoensis Kron & P.W.Fritsch – northern Sumatra
- Gaultheria gallowayana (Argent) Kron & P.W.Fritsch – Sulawesi
- Gaultheria glaucicaulis (Argent) Kron & P.W.Fritsch – Sulawesi
- Gaultheria glauciflora (Sleumer) Kron & P.W.Fritsch – northern Sumatra
- Gaultheria glaucifolia Hemsl. – Mexico (Durango and Jalisco)
- Gaultheria glomerata (Cav.) Sleumer – Venezuela to Bolivia
- Gaultheria gonggashanensis P.W.Fritsch & Lu Lu – China (Sichuan)
- Gaultheria gracilescens Sleumer – western New Guinea
- Gaultheria gracilipes (J.J.Sm.) Kron & P.W.Fritsch – southwestern Sulawesi
- Gaultheria gracilis Small – Costa Rica and Panama
- Gaultheria griffithiana Wight Eastern Nepal to south-central China and Vietnam
- Gaultheria haemantha (Sleumer) Kron & P.W.Fritsch – central Sulawesi
- Gaultheria hapalotricha A.C.Sm. – Venezuela, Colombia, Peru, and Bolivia
- Gaultheria hendrianiana (Argent) Kron & P.W.Fritsch – Sulawesi
- Gaultheria heteromera R.C.Fang – Arunachal Pradesh and southeast Tibet
- Gaultheria hirta Ridl. – Peninsula Malaysia (Perak: Gunung Korbu)
- Gaultheria hispida R.Br. - snow berry – Tasmania
- Gaultheria hispidula (L.) Muhl. ex Bigelow - creeping snowberry or moxie-plum – Canada and the northern United States
- Gaultheria hookeri C.B.Clarke – Nepal, Tibet, and the eastern Himalayas to south-Central China
- Gaultheria howellii (Sleumer) D.J.Middleton – Galápagos
- Gaultheria humifusa (Graham) Rydb. - alpine wintergreen or alpine spicy wintergreen – western Canada and western United States
- Gaultheria hypochlora Airy Shaw – Arunachal Pradesh, Tibet, China (Sichuan and Yunnan) and northern Myanmar
- Gaultheria insana (Molina) D.J.Middleton south-central Chile and southern Argentina
- Gaultheria insipida Benth. - chichaja – Colombia and Ecuador
- Gaultheria × intermedia J.J.Sm. – G. leucocarpa × G. punctata – Sumatra and Java
- Gaultheria itatiaiae Wawra – southeastern and southern Brazil
- Gaultheria japonica (A.Gray) Sleumer – Japan (northern and central Honshu)
- Gaultheria jiewhoei (Mustaqim) Kron & P.W.Fritsch – Sulawesi
- Gaultheria jingdongensis R.C.Fang – China (west-central Yunnan)
- Gaultheria × jordanensis Brade & Sleum. – G. eriophylla × G. itatiaiae – southeastern Brazil
- Gaultheria kalimantanensis (P.Wilkie & Argent) Kron & P.W.Fritsch – Borneo (Meratus Mountains)
- Gaultheria kalmiifolia (Sleumer) Kron & P.W.Fritsch – Borneo (Sarawak)
- Gaultheria kamengiana S.Panda & Sanjappa – Arunachal Pradesh
- Gaultheria kemiriensis Sleumer – Sumatra
- Gaultheria kemulensis (J.J.Sm.) Kron & P.W.Fritsch – east-central Borneo (Mount Kemul)
- Gaultheria kinabaluensis (Stapf) Kron & P.W.Fritsch – northern Borneo
- Gaultheria kingii (Merr.) Kron & P.W.Fritsch – Malay Peninsula, Borneo, and northern Sumatra
- Gaultheria kitangladensis (P.W.Fritsch) Kron & P.W.Fritsch – Philippines (Mindanao)
- Gaultheria kjellbergii (J.J.Sm.) Kron & P.W.Fritsch – southeastern Sulawesi
- Gaultheria kosteri (Sleumer) Kron & P.W.Fritsch – western New Guinea
- Gaultheria kostermansii (Sleumer) Kron & P.W.Fritsch – Borneo (east-central Kalimantan)
- Gaultheria lamii (J.J.Sm.) Kron & P.W.Fritsch – northwestern New Guinea (Mt. Doorman)
- Gaultheria lanceolata Hook.f. – Tasmania
- Gaultheria lanigera Hook. – Ecuador
- Gaultheria lavandulifolia (Sleumer) Kron & P.W.Fritsch – Borneo (Sarawak)
- Gaultheria ledermannii (Schltr.) Kron & P.W.Fritsch – northeastern New Guinea
- Gaultheria leucocarpa Blume – Sumatra and Java
- Gaultheria lilianae (J.J.Sm.) Kron & P.W.Fritsch – western New Guinea
- Gaultheria linifolia (Phil.) Teillier & R.A.Rodr. – south-central and southern Chile and southern Argentina
- Gaultheria loheri (Merr.) Kron & P.W.Fritsch – Philippines (Luzon: Caraballo Mountains)
- Gaultheria lohitiensis S.Panda & Sanjappa – Arunachal Pradesh
- Gaultheria longiracemosa Y.C.Yang – China (west-central Sichuan)
- Gaultheria lorentzii (Koord.) Kron & P.W.Fritsch – southern New Guinea
- Gaultheria losirensis Sleumer – Sumatra (Mount Leuser)
- Gaultheria lotungensis (Argent) Kron & P.W.Fritsch – northern Borneo
- Gaultheria luzonica A.Gray – Philippines
- Gaultheria lysolepis (Sleumer) Kron & P.W.Fritsch – Papua New Guinea
- Gaultheria macrocalyx Kron & P.W.Fritsch – Peninsular Malaysia
- Gaultheria macrostigma (Colenso) D.J.Middleton – New Zealand
- Gaultheria major (Airy Shaw) P.W.Fritsch & Lu Lu – eastern Himalayas, Tibet, and Yunnan
- Gaultheria malayana Airy Shaw – Peninsular Malaysia
- Gaultheria mantorii (Argent) Kron & P.W.Fritsch – Borneo (Sabah)
- Gaultheria marginata (N.E.Br.) D.J.Middleton – southern Venezuela
- Gaultheria marronina P.W.Fritsch & Lu Lu – China (Sichuan)
- Gaultheria marticorenae Teillier & P.W.Fritsch – central and southern Chile and southern Argentina
- Gaultheria megabracteata (Argent) Kron & P.W.Fritsch – Borneo (Sarawak)
- Gaultheria megalodonta A.C.Sm. – Ecuador and Peru
- Gaultheria mekonggaensis (Argent & Widjaja) Kron & P.W.Fritsch – Sulawesi
- Gaultheria memecyloides (Stapf) Kron & P.W.Fritsch – northern Borneo
- Gaultheria merrillii Kron & P.W.Fritsch – Philippines (Luzon and Negros)
- Gaultheria microsalicifolia (Argent) Kron & P.W.Fritsch – Borneo (Sarawak)
- Gaultheria minuta Merr. – Himalayas, northern Myanmar, and Yunnan
- Gaultheria minutiflora (Sleumer) Kron & P.W.Fritsch – Sulawesi
- Gaultheria mogeana (Argent) Kron & P.W.Fritsch – Borneo (Kalimantan)
- Gaultheria morobeensis (Sleumer) Kron & P.W.Fritsch – New Guinea
- Gaultheria mucronata (L.f.) Hook. & Arn. - prickly heath or chaura – south-central and southern Chile and southern Argentina
- Gaultheria multiglandulosa (Steyerm. & Maguire) Kron & P.W.Fritsch – Venezuela (Bolívar)
- Gaultheria muluensis Kron & P.W.Fritsch – Borneo (Sabah and Sarawak)
- Gaultheria mundula F.Muell. – eastern New Guinea
- Gaultheria muscicola (Sleumer) Kron & P.W.Fritsch – western New Guinea
- Gaultheria myrsinoides Kunth – Mexico to northwestern Argentina
- Gaultheria myrtilloides Cham. & Schltdl. – Brazil (Minas Gerais and Rio de Janeiro)
- Gaultheria myrtillus (Stapf) Kron & P.W.Fritsch – northern Borneo
- Gaultheria ngii (Argent) Kron & P.W.Fritsch – Peninsular Malaysia
- Gaultheria nivea (J.Anthony) Airy Shaw – southeastern Tibet and northwestern Yunnan
- Gaultheria notabilis J.Anthony – China (Yunnan)
- Gaultheria novaguineensis J.J.Sm. – western New Guinea
- Gaultheria nubicola D.J.Middleton – South Island of New Zealand
- Gaultheria nubigena (Phil.) B.L.Burtt & Sleum. – south-central and southern Chile and southern Argentina
- Gaultheria nummularioides D.Don – Himalayas, Assam, Bangladesh, Myanmar, south-central China, Sumatra, Java, and Lesser Sunda Islands
- Gaultheria obovata (Airy Shaw) P.W.Fritsch & Lu Lu – Eastern Nepal, Tibet, northern Myanmar, and China (Yunnan)
- Gaultheria oppositifolia Hook.f. – kama, niniwa or snowberry – North Island of New Zealand
- Gaultheria oreogena A.C.Sm. – western Colombia and Ecuador
- Gaultheria orophila (Sleumer) Kron & P.W.Fritsch – Borneo (Sarawak: Pegunungan Dulit)
- Gaultheria othmanii (Argent) Kron & P.W.Fritsch – Borneo (Sarawak)
- Gaultheria ovatifolia A.Gray – western teaberry or Oregon spicy wintergreen – western Canada and northwestern United States
- Gaultheria paniculata B.L.Burtt & A.W.Hill – North Island of New Zealand
- Gaultheria papuana (Mustaqim, Utteridge & Heatubun) Kron & P.W.Fritsch – western New Guinea
- Gaultheria paramicola A.Rojas & P.Muñoz – Costa Rica and Panama
- Gaultheria parvula D.J.Middleton – South Island of New Zealand
- Gaultheria paucinervia P.W.Fritsch & C.M.Bush – Borneo (Sabah)
- Gaultheria paulsmithii (Argent) Kron & P.W.Fritsch – Borneo (Sabah)
- Gaultheria pendens (Sleumer) Kron & P.W.Fritsch – western New Guinea
- Gaultheria penduliflora (Stapf) Kron & P.W.Fritsch – northern Borneo
- Gaultheria pernettyoides Sleumer – Sumatra (Mount Leuser)
- Gaultheria phillyreifolia (Pers.) Sleumer – Argentina and central Chile
- Gaultheria piceifolia (Sleumer) Kron & P.W.Fritsch – central Borneo
- Gaultheria pilosa (Blume) Zoll. & Moritzi – western Java
- Gaultheria pinifolia (Stapf) Kron & P.W.Fritsch – northern Borneo
- Gaultheria pittosporifolia (J.J.Sm.) Kron & P.W.Fritsch – Borneo
- Gaultheria platyphylla (P.W.Fritsch) Kron & P.W.Fritsch – Philippines (Mindanao)
- Gaultheria poeppigii DC. – central and southern Chile and central and southern Argentina
- Gaultheria praticola C.Y.Wu – southeastern Tibet and northwestern Yunnan
- Gaultheria procumbens L. – eastern teaberry, checkerberry, boxberry, or American wintergreen – eastern and central Canada and eastern United States
- Gaultheria prostrata W.W.Sm. – northwestern Yunnan to Vietnam
- Gaultheria pseudonotabilis H.Li ex R.C.Fang – northwestern Yunnan
- Gaultheria pseudorufescens (Sleumer) Kron & P.W.Fritsch – Peninsular Malaysia and northern Borneo
- Gaultheria pubivertex (Sleumer) Kron & P.W.Fritsch – northern Sumatra
- Gaultheria pullei J.J.Sm. – New Guinea
- Gaultheria pumila (L.f.) D.J.Middleton – Chile and western and southern Argentina
- Gaultheria punctulata (Stapf) Kron & P.W.Fritsch – northern Borneo
- Gaultheria puradyatmikae (Mustaqim, Utteridge & Heatubun) Kron & P.W.Fritsch – western New Guinea
- Gaultheria purpurascens Kunth – Colombia (Cundinamarca)
- Gaultheria purpurea R.C.Fang – southeastern Tibet
- Gaultheria pyrolifolia Hook.f. ex C.B.Clarke – eastern Himalayas, Tibet, northern Myanmar, and south-central China
- Gaultheria pyroloides Hook.f. & Thomson ex Miq. – Sakhalin and northern and central Japan
- Gaultheria racemulosa (DC.) D.J.Middleton – Juan Fernández Islands
- Gaultheria rengifoana Phil. – Chile
- Gaultheria reticulata Kunth – Ecuador, Peru, and Bolivia
- Gaultheria retusa (Sleumer) Kron & P.W.Fritsch - central Sulawesi
- Gaultheria rhombica (Argent) Kron & P.W.Fritsch – Borneo (Sabah)
- Gaultheria rigida Kunth – Venezuela, Colombia, Ecuador, and Peru
- Gaultheria rigidifolia (P.W.Fritsch & C.M.Bush) Kron & P.W.Fritsch – Borneo
- Gaultheria rosea (Sleumer) Kron & P.W.Fritsch – western New Guinea (Nettoti Mountains)
- Gaultheria rosmarinifolia (Sleumer) Kron & P.W.Fritsch – northern Borneo
- Gaultheria rubella (Sleumer) Kron & P.W.Fritsch – west-central Sumatra
- Gaultheria rubidiflora (J.J.Sm.) Kron & P.W.Fritsch – southern Sulawesi
- Gaultheria rufa (Stapf) Kron & P.W.Fritsch – northern Borneo
- Gaultheria rupestris (G.Forst.) G.Don – South Island of New Zealand
- Gaultheria rupicola (Sleumer) Kron & P.W.Fritsch – New Guinea
- Gaultheria sagittanthera (J.J.Sm.) Kron & P.W.Fritsch – central Sulawesi
- Gaultheria sanguinolenta (Sleumer) Kron & P.W.Fritsch – northern Borneo
- Gaultheria santanderensis A.C.Sm. – Colombia
- Gaultheria saurauioides (J.J.Sm.) Kron & P.W.Fritsch – east-central Borneo (Mount Kemul)
- Gaultheria scabrida (Becc.) Kron & P.W.Fritsch – Borneo
- Gaultheria schramii (Sleumer) Kron & P.W.Fritsch – western New Guinea (Nettoti Mountains)
- Gaultheria schultesii Camp – Mexico (Oaxaca)
- Gaultheria schultzei (Schltr.) Kron & P.W.Fritsch northeastern New Guinea
- Gaultheria sclerophylla Cuatrec. – Ecuador, Colombia, northwestern Venezuela, and western Bolivia
- Gaultheria semi-infera (C.B.Clarke) Airy Shaw – eastern Himalayas, Tibet, Myanmar, south-Central China, and Vietnam
- Gaultheria sepikensis Kron & P.W.Fritsch – northeastern New Guinea
- Gaultheria serrata (Vell.) Kin.-Gouv. ex Luteyn – southeastern Brazil
- Gaultheria × serrulata Herzog – G. erecta × G. vaccinioides – Bolivia
- Gaultheria seshagiriana Subba Rao & Kumari – Arunachal Pradesh
- Gaultheria setiloba (Sleumer) Kron & P.W.Fritsch – western New Guinea
- Gaultheria setulosa N.E.Br. – southern Venezuela
- Gaultheria shallon Pursh – salal, shallon, or gaultheria – Alaska, British Columbia, and the United States west coast
- Gaultheria sinensis J.Anthony – Arunachal Pradesh, Tibet, Myanmar, and south-central China (Sichuan and Yunnan)
- Gaultheria sleumeri Smitinand & P.H.Hô – Vietnam
- Gaultheria sleumeriana Kin.-Gouv. – Brazil (São Paulo: Serra do Bocaina)
- Gaultheria smithii Kron & P.W.Fritsch – northern New Guinea (Cyclops Mountains)
- Gaultheria solitaria Sleumer – eastern Java (Mt. Ardjuno)
- Gaultheria soror (Becc.) Kron & P.W.Fritsch – western New Guinea
- Gaultheria speciosa (A.C.Sm.) Kron & P.W.Fritsch – Venezuela (Bolívar)
- Gaultheria sphenophylla (Sleumer) Kron & P.W.Fritsch – northern Borneo
- Gaultheria stapfiana Airy Shaw – eastern Himalayas, northern Myanmar, and China (Yunnan)
- Gaultheria steenisii Kron & P.W.Fritsch – Sumatra
- Gaultheria stellaris (Sleumer) Kron & P.W.Fritsch – New Guinea (Mt. Antares)
- Gaultheria stenophylla P.W.Fritsch & Lu Lu – eastern Himalayas, southeastern Tibet, and China (Yunnan)
- Gaultheria stereophylla A.C.Sm. – Ecuador (Azuay)
- Gaultheria steyermarkii Luteyn – Venezuela (Sucre)
- Gaultheria straminea R.C.Fang – southeastern Tibet
- Gaultheria strigosa Benth. – Peru, Ecuador, Colombia, and northwestern Venezuela
- Gaultheria subcorymbosa Colenso – New Zealand
- Gaultheria subglobularis (Sleumer) Kron & P.W.Fritsch – central New Guinea
- Gaultheria suborbicularis W.W.Sm. – China (northwestern Yunnan)
- Gaultheria sulawesiensis Kron & P.W.Fritsch – central Sulawesi
- Gaultheria sulcinervia Kron & P.W.Fritsch – northern Borneo
- Gaultheria sumatrensis (Merr.) Kron & P.W.Fritsch – Sumatra
- Gaultheria supyanii (Argent) Kron & P.W.Fritsch – Sulawesi
- Gaultheria taiwaniana S.S.Ying – central Taiwan
- Gaultheria tasmanica (Hook.f.) D.J.Middleton – Tasmania
- Gaultheria tenuifolia (Phil.) Sleumer – central and southern Chile and southern Argentina
- Gaultheria tetracme (Airy Shaw) P.W.Fritsch & Lu Lu – China (western Sichuan)
- Gaultheria tetramera W.W.Sm. – Sikkim through eastern Himalayas and Tibet to western Yunnan
- Gaultheria thymifolia Stapf ex Airy Shaw – Arunachal Pradesh, Tibet, northern Myanmar, and China (Yunnan)
- Gaultheria tomentosa Kunth – Ecuador and Peru
- Gaultheria triangulanthera (J.J.Sm.) Kron & P.W.Fritsch – central Sulawesi
- Gaultheria trichophylla Royle - Himalayan snowberry – Himalayas to northern Myanmar and south-central China
- Gaultheria trigonoclada R.C.Fang – southeastern Tibet
- Gaultheria trinervia (Elmer) Kron & P.W.Fritsch – Philippines (Mindanao: Mt. Calelan)
- Gaultheria ulei Sleumer – southern Brazil
- Gaultheria undata (J.J.Sm.) Kron & P.W.Fritsch – southwestern Sulawesi
- Gaultheria urceolata (Stapf) Kron & P.W.Fritsch – northern Borneo
- Gaultheria urdanetensis (Elmer) Kron & P.W.Fritsch – Philippines (Mindanao: Mt. Urdaneta)
- Gaultheria vaccinioides Griseb. ex Wedd. – Peru and Bolivia
- Gaultheria vareschii (Steyerm.) Kron & P.W.Fritsch – Venezuela (Bolívar)
- Gaultheria varians (Sleumer) Kron & P.W.Fritsch – New Guinea
- Gaultheria viridicarpa J.B.Williams – southeastern Queensland to northeastern New South Wales
- Gaultheria viridiflora Sleumer – southwestern central Sulawesi (Latimodjong Mountains)
- Gaultheria wardii C.Marquand & Airy-Shaw – Arunachal Pradesh, Tibet, northern Myanmar, and south-central China
