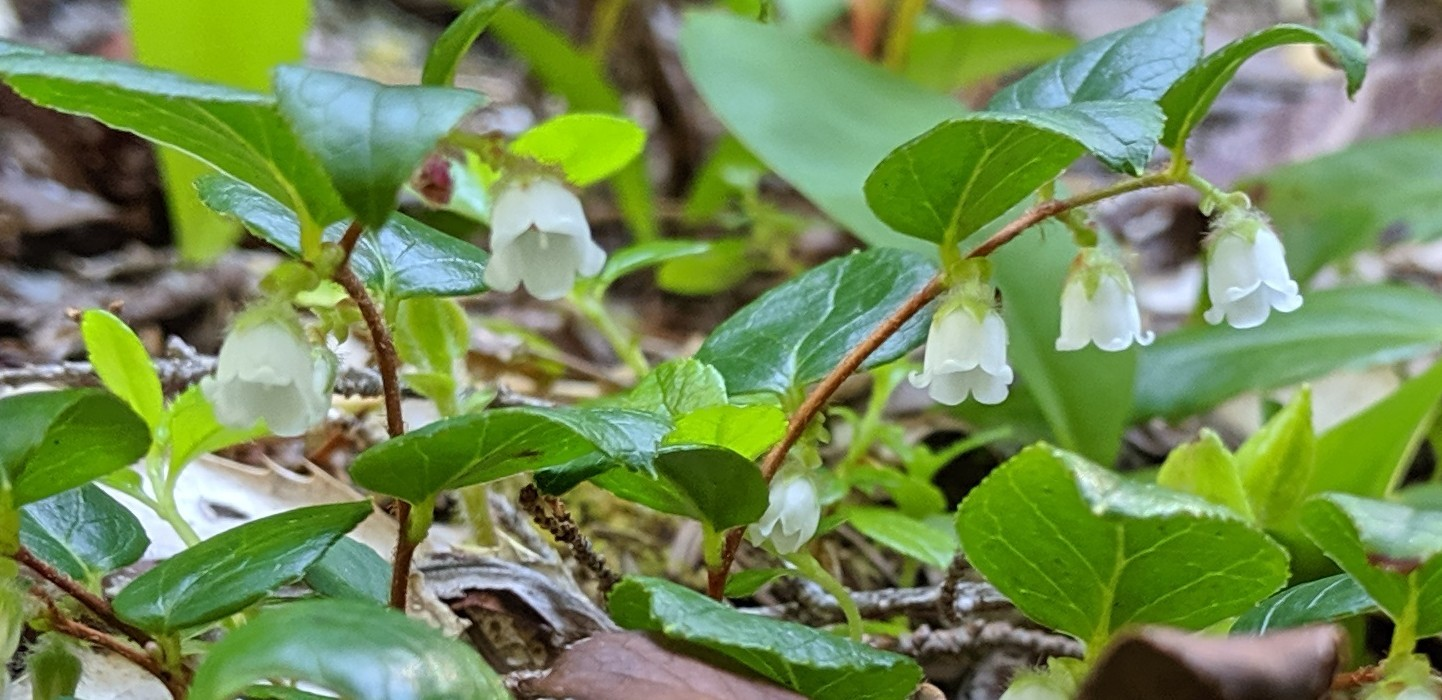

Scientific classification
- Kingdom: Plantae
- Clade: Tracheophytes
- Clade: Angiosperms
- Clade: Eudicots
- Clade: Asterids
- Order: Ericales
- Family: Ericaceae
- Genus: Gaultheria
- Species: G. ovatifolia

Binomial name
- Gaultheria ovatifolia Gray

= Gaultheria ovatifolia =

Species of flowering plant

Gaultheria ovatifolia is a species of shrub in the heath family which is known by the common names western teaberry, Oregon spicy wintergreen, and slender wintergreen. It is native to western North America from British Columbia to California, where it grows in high mountain forests.

== Description ==
Gaultheria ovatifolia is a small, low shrub with stems only about 35 cm (14 in) in maximum length, usually growing as a ground-hugging mat. The evergreen pointed, oval-shaped leaves are 2 to 3 cm (3/4 to 1 1/4 in) long and green. The plant bears small, solitary bell-shaped flowers in shades of white to very light pink with reddish bracts. The flowers hang like tiny bells. The fruit is a red berrylike capsule.

== Uses ==
The fruit is edible.

It was a food for the Hoh and Quileute of the Pacific Northwest.

== See also ==
- Gaultheria humifusa – alpine wintergreen
- Gaultheria procumbens – eastern teaberry, checkerberry, boxberry or American wintergreen
- Wintergreens
