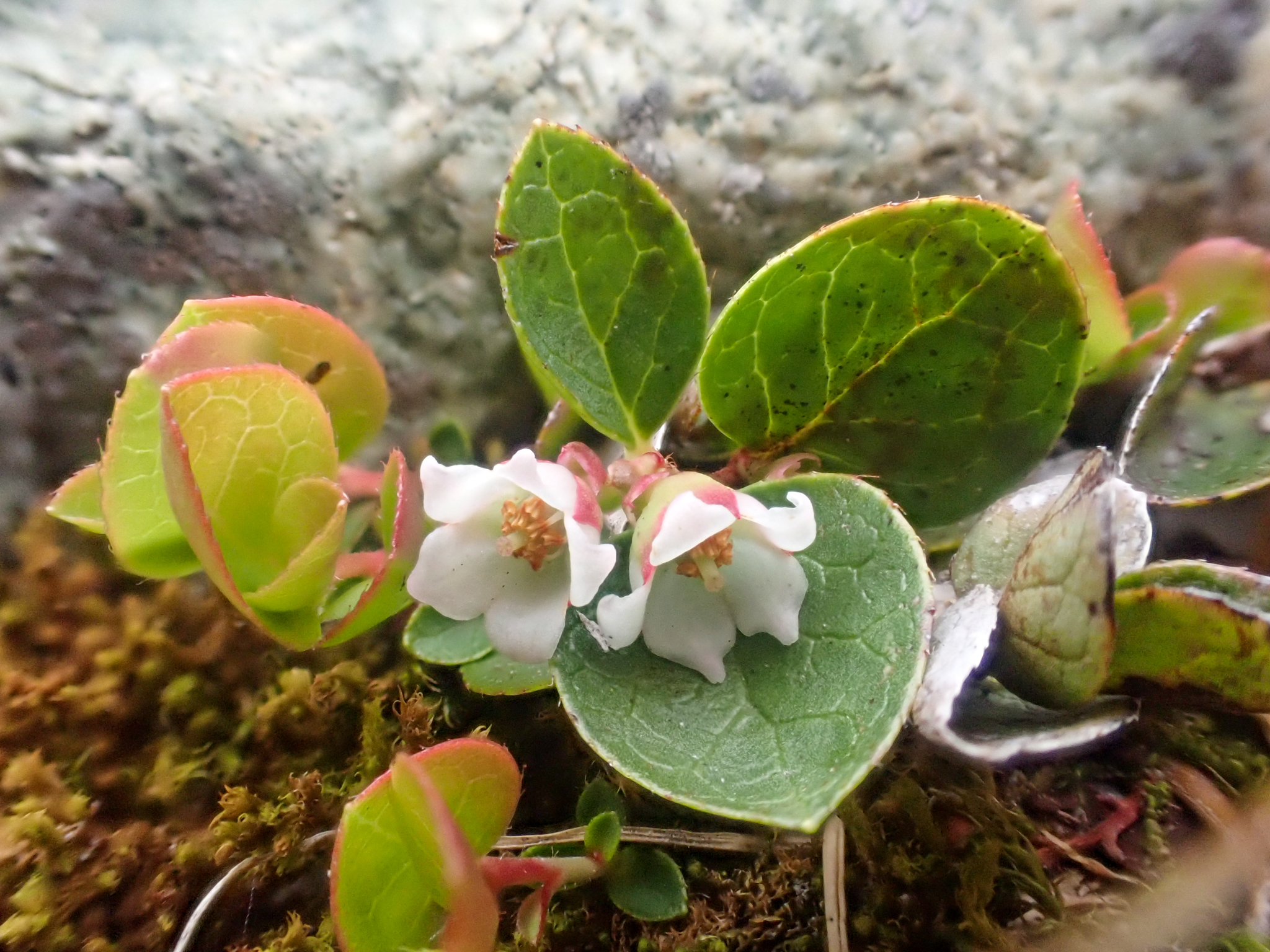
- Gaultheria humifusa blooming

Conservation status
- Secure (NatureServe)

Scientific classification
- Kingdom: Plantae
- Clade: Tracheophytes
- Clade: Angiosperms
- Clade: Eudicots
- Clade: Asterids
- Order: Ericales
- Family: Ericaceae
- Genus: Gaultheria
- Species: G. humifusa

Binomial name
- Gaultheria humifusa (Graham) Rydb.

= Gaultheria humifusa =

Species of flowering plant

Gaultheria humifusa is a species of shrub in the heath family which is known by the common names alpine wintergreen and alpine spicy wintergreen. It is native to western North America, from British Columbia to California to Colorado, where it grows in moist subalpine mountain forests. It is a low, spreading shrub which may be quite small, forming flat patches on the ground or amongst rock and leaf litter. The stems are less than 20 cm (7.9 in) in length and have small oval-shaped leaves 1 to 2 cm (0.39 to 0.79 in) long. It bears solitary bell-shaped flowers with white to light pink corollas and golden anthers which, after pollination, mature into bright to dull red berrylike fruit capsules. The leaves and fruit of Gaultheria humifusa are edible.

== See also ==
- Gaultheria ovatifolia – western teaberry or Oregon spicy wintergreen
- Gaultheria procumbens – eastern teaberry, checkerberry, boxberry or American wintergreen
- Wintergreens
