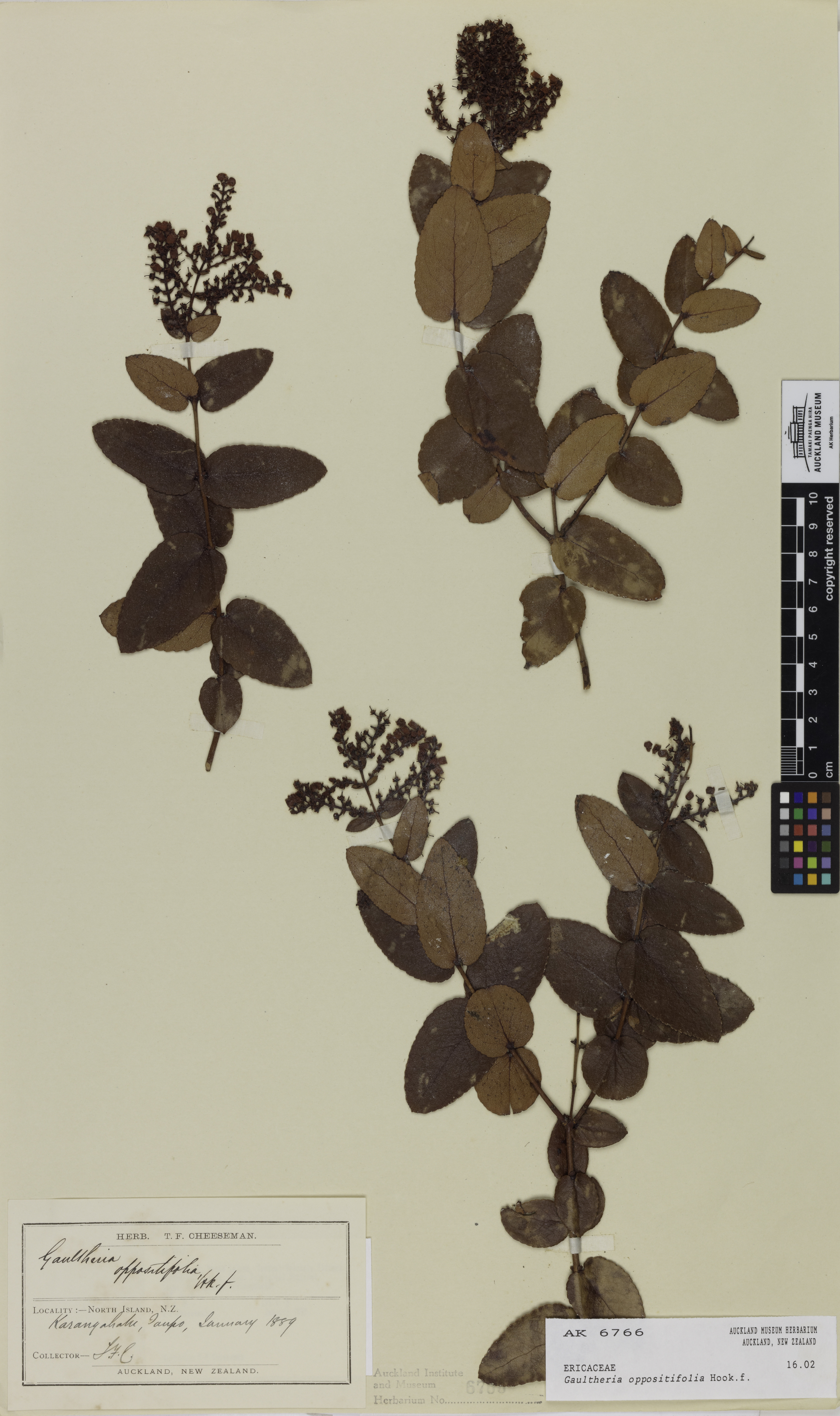

Scientific classification
- Kingdom: Plantae
- Clade: Tracheophytes
- Clade: Angiosperms
- Clade: Eudicots
- Clade: Asterids
- Order: Ericales
- Family: Ericaceae
- Genus: Gaultheria
- Species: G. oppositifolia

Binomial name
- Gaultheria oppositifolia Hook.f.

= Gaultheria oppositifolia =

Species of shrub

Gaultheria oppositifolia is a shrub in the heath family Ericaceae, endemic to New Zealand. Māori names include kama and niniwa. Common name for the genus in New Zealand is snowberry.

G. oppositifolia is a stout bushy spreading shrub that grows mostly in rocky places in the North Island, often observed beneath manuka scrub. The pairs of oval leathery toothed leaves are attached directly to the twigs. Late summer flowers are white and bell-shaped, and appear in clusters up to 10 cm (3.9 in) long at the tips of twigs. Leaves are 3–6 cm (1.2–2.4 in) long by 2–3 cm (0.79–1.18 in) wide. Autumn fruit is a dry red or white capsule.
