= Gaultheria appressa =

Scientific classification
- Kingdom: Plantae
- Clade: Tracheophytes
- Clade: Angiosperms
- Clade: Eudicots
- Clade: Asterids
- Order: Ericales
- Family: Ericaceae
- Genus: Gaultheria
- Species: G. appressa

Binomial name
- Gaultheria appressa A.W.Hill

Species of flowering plant

Gaultheria appressa, the waxberry or white waxberry, is a shrub in the family Ericaceae. The species is endemic to Australia. It has an erect or spreading habit, growing to between 0.5 and 2 metres (1.6 and 6.6 ft) high, and has reddish brown hairs on its stems. Leaves are 3 to 8 cm (1.2 to 3.1 in) long and 1 to 3 cm (0.39 to 1.18 in) wide with small teeth along the edges. Flowers appear in groups of three to eleven in racemes in late spring to summer. The sepals become fleshy, white and enlarged during fruit formation. The fruits are between 7 and 10 millimetres (0.28 and 0.39 in) in diameter.

The species occurs in woodland, forest, subalpine scrub and rainforest margins in New South Wales and Victoria. In the Greater Sydney region it is recorded in areas with an altitude of between 800 and 1,000 metres (2,600 and 3,300 ft) and with an annual rainfall of 1,000 mm (39 in).
