= Gaultheria puradyatmikae =

Conservation status
- Data Deficient (IUCN 3.1)

Scientific classification
- Kingdom: Plantae
- Clade: Tracheophytes
- Clade: Angiosperms
- Clade: Eudicots
- Clade: Asterids
- Order: Ericales
- Family: Ericaceae
- Genus: Gaultheria
- Species: G. puradyatmikae

Binomial name
- Gaultheria puradyatmikae (Mustaqim, Utteridge & Heatubun) Kron & P.W.Fritsch

Synonyms
- Diplycosia puradyatmikae Mustaqim, Utteridge & Heatubun

Species of shrub

Gaultheria puradyatmikae is a multi-branched terrestrial shrub growing up to 1.5 metres (4.9 ft) tall. It is endemic Mount Jaya in Papua Province of Indonesia on the western half of the island New Guinea. It was collected in flower in November, and fruiting in June and November.

== Distribution and habitat ==
The plant appears to be endemic to disturbed mid-montane areas of Mount Jaya, where it has been observed between 2,700 and 2,770 metres elevation.

It was found growing in ridge shrubbery with many ericaceous plants including Gaultheria pullei J.J.Sm. and other species of Rhododendron and Gaultheria. A specimen was collected in Nothofagus forest regenerating from disturbance.

== Taxonomy ==
It was described in 2020 based on two prior collected specimens and new observations in the field. The specific epithet refers to Pratita Puradyatmika, the General Supervisor of Highland Reclamation and Monitoring at the PT Freeport Indonesia Mining Company, who worked with biologists over many years to undertake biodiversity inventories in and around the region.
