= Jean François Gaultier =

French physician and botanist (1708–1756)

Jean François Gaultier (6 October 1708 in La Croix-Avranchin – 10 July 1756 in Quebec) was a French physician and botanist. He was the king's physician for New France and was the regular physician at the Hôtel-Dieu de Québec. Gaultier, being one of the leading naturalists in Canada, supported Swedish botanist Pehr Kalm in his 1749 exploring voyage of Quebec. He is known primarily for giving his name to a genus of shrubs (see Gaultheria).
