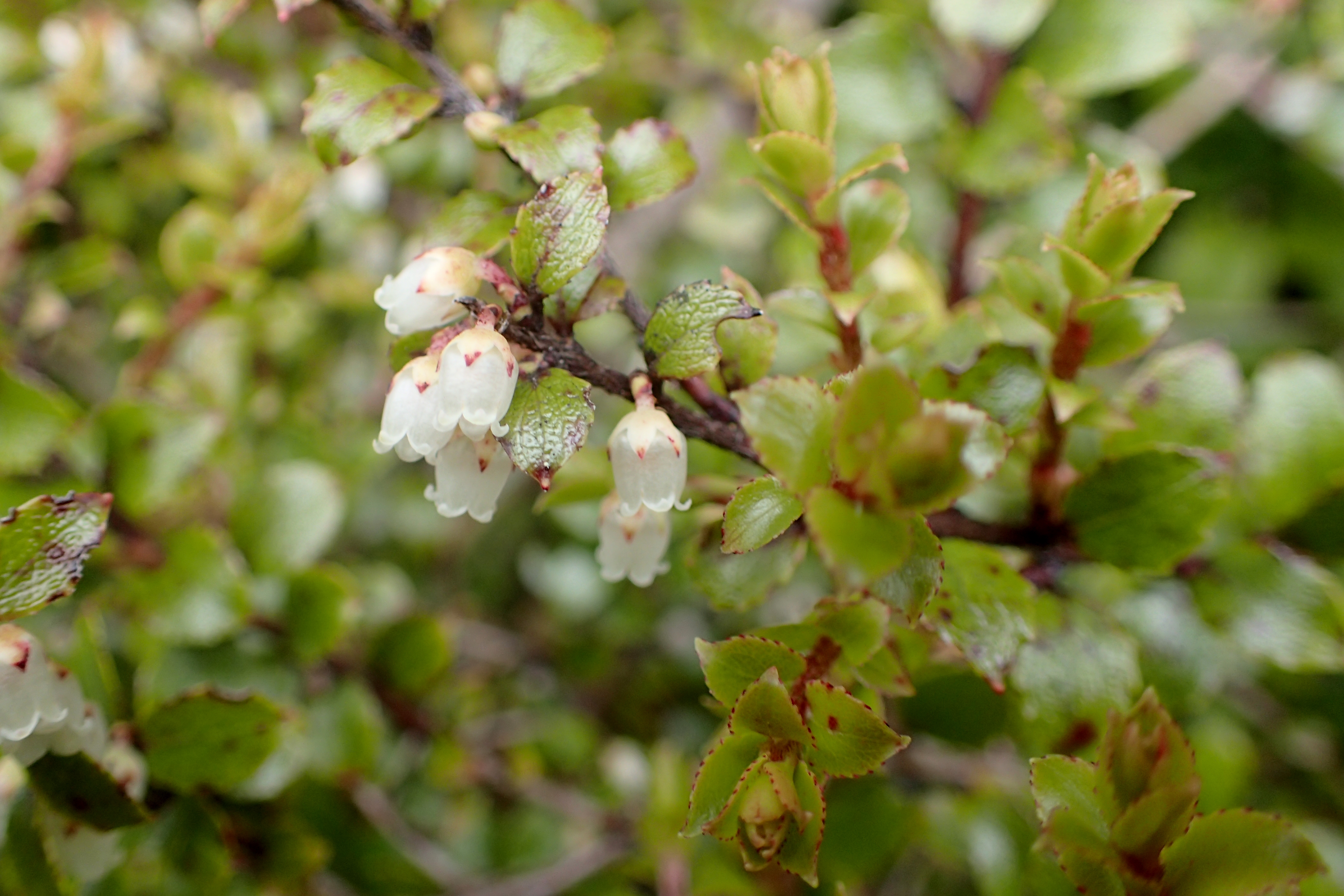

Scientific classification
- Kingdom: Plantae
- Clade: Tracheophytes
- Clade: Angiosperms
- Clade: Eudicots
- Clade: Asterids
- Order: Ericales
- Family: Ericaceae
- Genus: Gaultheria
- Species: G. antipoda

Binomial name
- Gaultheria antipoda G.Forst.

= Gaultheria antipoda =

Species of shrub endemic to New Zealand

Gaultheria antipoda, commonly known as snowberry or fools beech, is a shrub in the family Ericaceae. It is endemic to New Zealand.

== Description ==
Gaultheria antipoda is an upright or spreading shrub that grows to 1–2 metres (3.3–6.6 ft) high. The leaves are 5–15 mm (0.20–0.59 in) long, and are leathery, shiny, with small serrations. G. antipoda flowers around November, followed by white to red berries in late summer and autumn. Unlike some other Gaultheria species that exhibit gynodioecy, G. antipoda is a hermaphroditic species (the individuals produce both pollen and seeds).

== Distribution ==
This species is found in the North Island between 37° – 39°30'S in lowland to subalpine scrub habitat particularly on cliffs and rocky places.
