= Cox River (New Zealand) =

River in South Island, New Zealand

- Route of the Cox River
- Mouth of the Cox River Cox River (New Zealand) (South Island)

Location
- Country: New Zealand

Physical characteristics
- Source
  - location: Crawford Range
  - coordinates: 42°44′41″S 171°54′25″E
  - elevation: 1,250 m (4,100 ft)
- Mouth
  - location: Poulter River
  - coordinates: 42°54′02″S 171°58′00″E
  - elevation: 540 m (1,770 ft)
- Length: 29 km (18 mi)

Basin features
- Progression: Cox River → Poulter River East Branch → Poulter River → Waimakariri River → Pegasus Bay → Pacific Ocean
- Tributaries
  - left: Ellis Stream, Cochran Stream
  - right: Montgomery Stream, Row Stream, Beckett Stream

Cox River is a river in the Canterbury region of New Zealand. It arises in the Crawford Range of the Southern Alps and flows generally southward through the Arthur's Pass National Park to join the Poulter River. The river was named for J. W. M. Cox, a landholder in the 1860s at the junction of Cox River and Bull Creek.

== Geomorphology ==
Prior to glaciation the Cox River flowed through the Pūkio Stream valley, discharging into the Esk River, a lower tributary of the Waimakariri River. This route was later blocked by a series of terminal moraines deposited by the Cox glacier during the Pleistocene period. The river then created a new outlet through to the main Poulter valley via a rocky gorge, known as McArthur Gorge, which now contains the East Branch of the Poulter.

== See also ==
- List of rivers of New Zealand
