= Pūkio Stream =

River in North Canterbury, New Zealand

- Location of the mouth within New Zealand

Physical characteristics
- Source: The Candlesticks
  - location: Southern Alps
- Mouth: Esk River
  - location: Canterbury, New Zealand
  - coordinates: 43.003035°S 172.052632°E

Pūkio Stream, formerly Nigger Stream until 2016, is a river in North Canterbury, South Island, New Zealand. It flows from The Candlesticks range of the Southern Alps to the Esk River. The underfit stream cuts through terraces of glacial outwash gravels in its course, culminating in a 120-metre-deep (400 ft) incised gorge near to its confluence with the Esk.

== Geomorphology ==
The over-wide valley through which Pūkio Stream flows, is due to the presence of an underlying fault depression which once acted as the former course of the Cox River. This route was later blocked by terminal moraines, from the Pleistocene age Cox glacier with the Cox river finding an alternative outlet to the Poulter River. The principal Lochinvar moraine is also known as the Misery Mounds.

The gorge in the lower reaches has been eroded through superficial deposits of glacial origin, and into the underlying greywacke bedrock.

== Name ==
It is not known why the name of Nigger Stream came about but it is known to have been since at least the 1880s. The stream was mentioned in the news but the New Zealand government stated they had not received any complaints about the name. In 2015, Nigger Stream was complained about by a member of the public to the New Zealand Geographic Board (NZGB) for being offensive. The NZGB proposed renaming the river "Steelhead Stream" after the steelhead trout. The proposal received 37 objections with the majority of them citing that steelhead trout were not found in the freshwater river as they were salt water trout. As a result, one of the reasons for NZGB's proposals was not considered valid.

This objection was upheld and the alternative Māori name of "Pūkio Stream", after the Māori name for carex secta (a tussock grass that grows in the area), was proposed instead. Following a second consultation on the new name which was supported by the Green Party of Aotearoa New Zealand, this proposal was passed unanimously by the NZGB however similar proposals in relation to nearby Niggerhead and Nigger Hill were referred to the Land Information New Zealand Minister, Louise Upston. Upston agreed to the additional changes along with the "Pūkio Stream" rename and said that the move was not an attempt to rewrite history stating: "This isn’t about rewriting history – it is and will remain a matter of public record that these three places used to carry different names."

== See also ==
- List of rivers of New Zealand
