= Taipoiti River =

River in the South Island of New Zealand

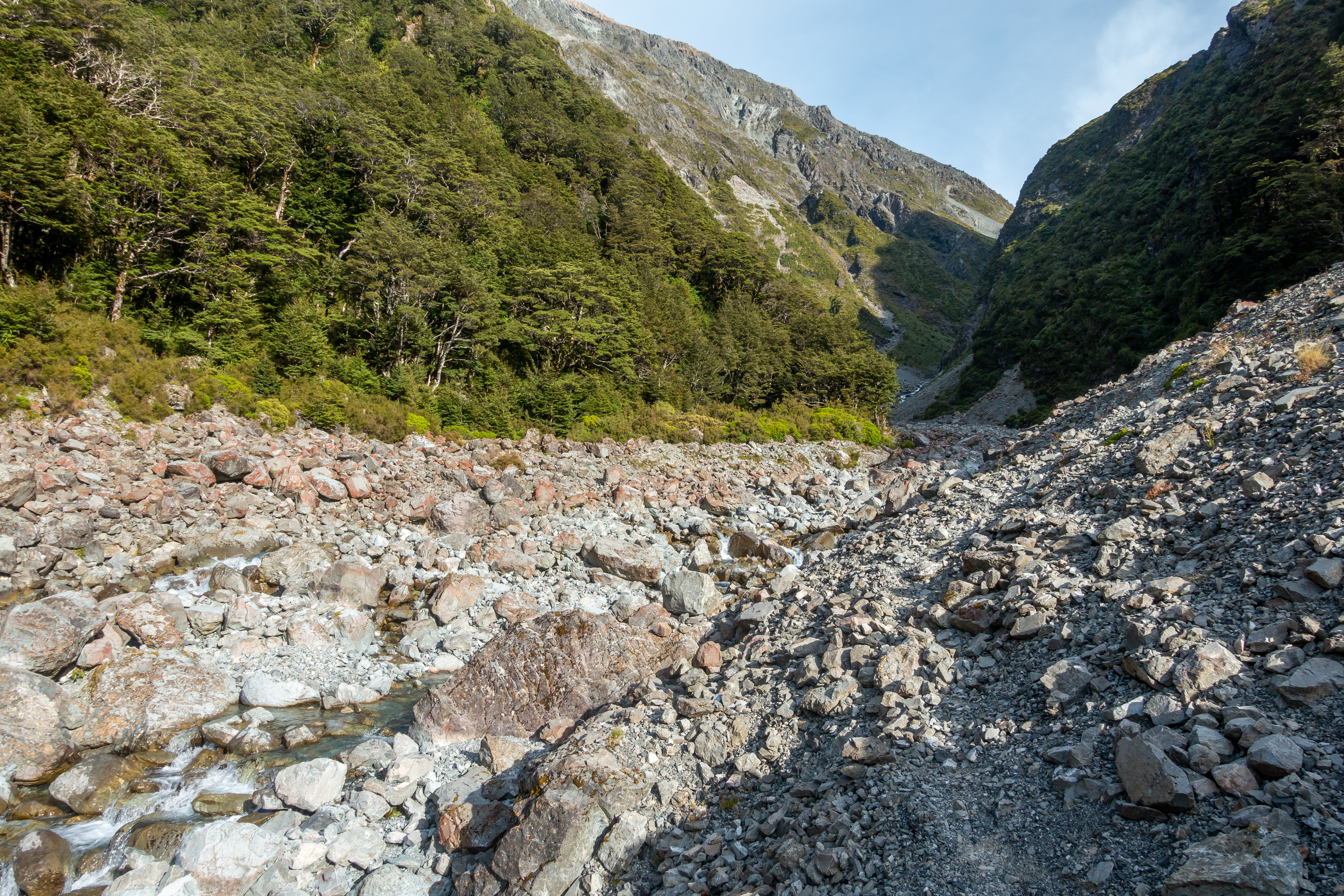
- Route of the Taipoiti River
- Mouth of the Taipoiti River Taipoiti River (South Island)

Location
- Country: New Zealand

Physical characteristics
- Source: Shaler Range
  - coordinates: 42.93666°S 171.423°E
- Mouth
  - location: White River
  - coordinates: 42°57′21″S 171°25′56″E
- Length: 3 km (1.9 mi)

Basin features
- Progression: Taipoiti River → White River → Waimakariri River → Pegasus Bay → Pacific Ocean

The Taipoiti River is a short river of the Canterbury region of New Zealand's South Island. One of the headwaters of the Waimakariri River, it flows southeast from the Shaler Range to reach the White River.

== See also ==
- List of rivers of New Zealand
