= Mount Davie =

Mountain in the Canterbury Region of New Zealand

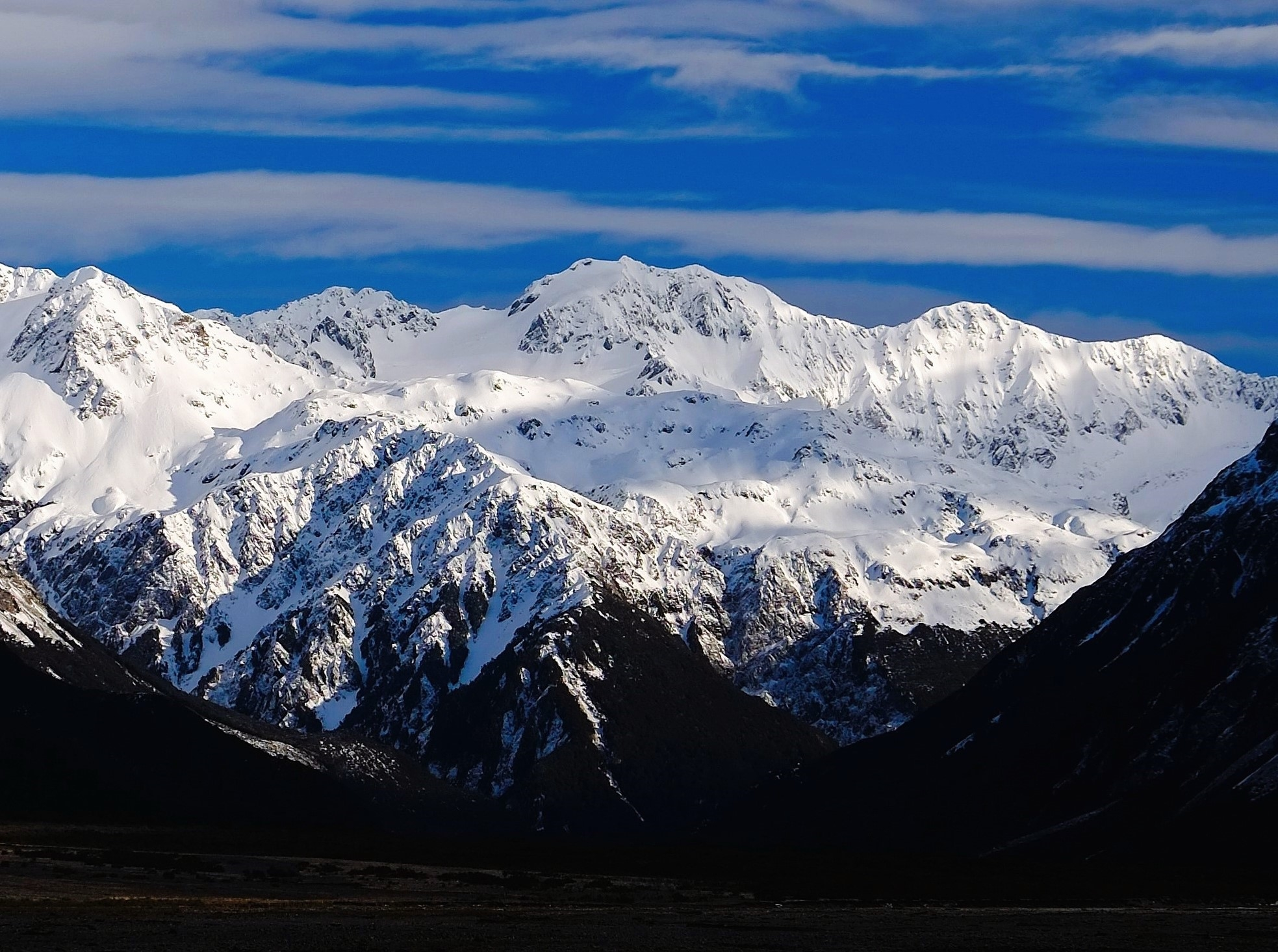
- East aspect

Highest point
- Elevation: 2,280 m (7,480 ft)
- Prominence: 216 m (709 ft)
- Parent peak: Mount Murchison
- Isolation: 4.34 km (2.70 mi)
- Coordinates: 42.96591°S 171.39333°E

Naming
- Etymology: Cyrus Davie
- Native name: Kaimatau (Māori)

Geography
- Location within New Zealand
- Interactive map of Mount Davie
- Location: South Island
- Country: New Zealand
- Region: Canterbury
- Protected area: Arthur's Pass National Park
- Parent range: Southern Alps; Shaler Range
- Topo map(s): Topo50 BV20; NZMS260 K33

Geology
- Rock age: Triassic
- Rock type: Rakaia Terrane

Climbing
- First ascent: 1912

Mount Davie is a 2,280-metre-elevation (7,480-foot) mountain in the Canterbury Region of New Zealand.

== Description ==
Mount Davie is located 122 kilometres (76 mi) northwest of Christchurch on the western boundary of Arthur's Pass National Park in the South Island. It is the second-highest peak in the Shaler Range of the Southern Alps, and second-highest in the park. Precipitation runoff from the mountain's east slope drains into the White River, whereas the west slope drains into Cronin Stream which is a tributary of the Wilberforce River. Topographic relief is significant as the summit rises 1,280 metres (4,199 feet) above the White River in two kilometres, and 1,180 metres (3,871 feet) above Cronin Strean in two kilometres. The nearest higher peak is Mount Murchison, 4.3 kilometres to the south. The mountain's toponym honours Cyrus Davie (1821–1871), chief surveyor in Canterbury.

== Climbing ==
The first ascent of the summit was made in 1912 by Fred Kitchingham, Charles Ward, and Arthur Talbot.

Climbing routes:

- Kilmarnock Spur – Jim Dennistoun, Arthur Paul Harper, R.N. Harper, E. Harper – (April 1912)
- Via Cronin Stream – Deryck Morse, B. Morse, J. Sampson, Geoff Chisholm, W. Mechan – (1941)
- Via Whitehorn Pass
- South Ridge

== Climate ==
Based on the Köppen climate classification, Mount Davie is located in a marine west coast (Cfb) climate zone, with a subpolar oceanic climate (Cfc) at the summit. Prevailing westerly winds blow moist air from the Tasman Sea onto the mountains, where the air is forced upwards by the mountains (orographic lift), causing moisture to drop in the form of rain or snow. This climate supports a small unnamed glacier on the southeast slope of this peak. The months of December through February offer the most favourable weather for viewing or climbing this peak.

== Gallery ==
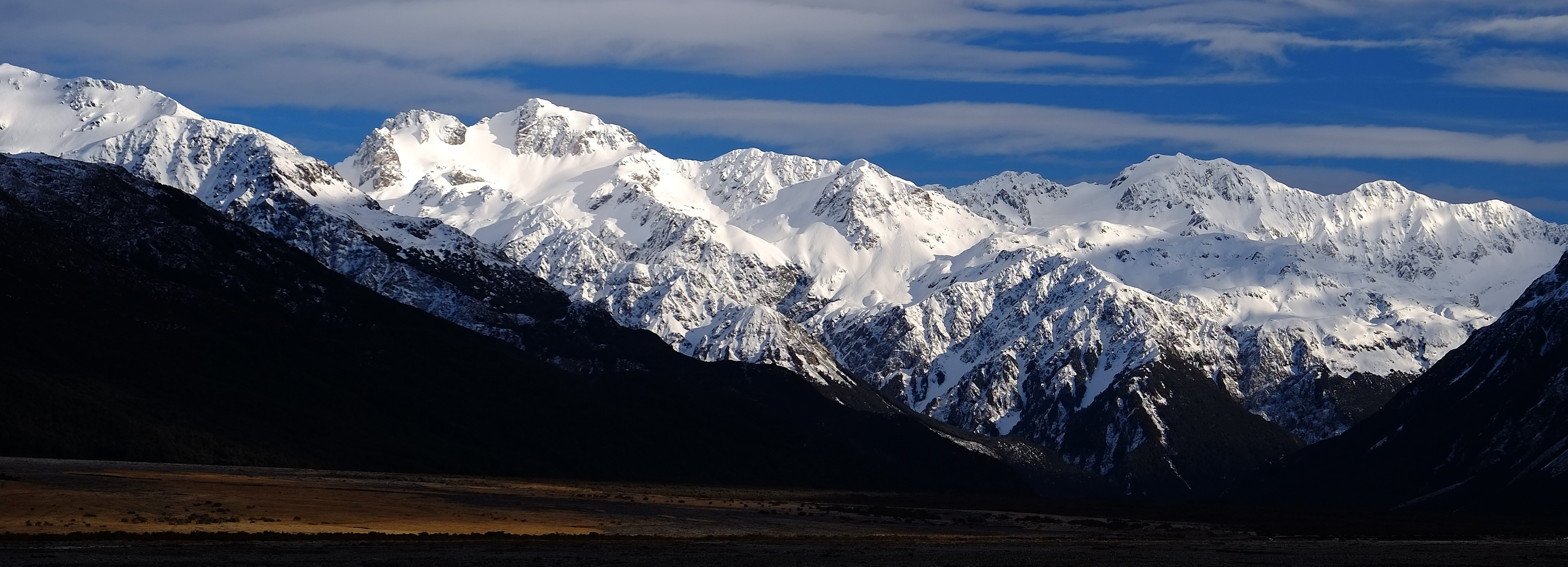
Mount Harper (left) and Mount Davie (right)

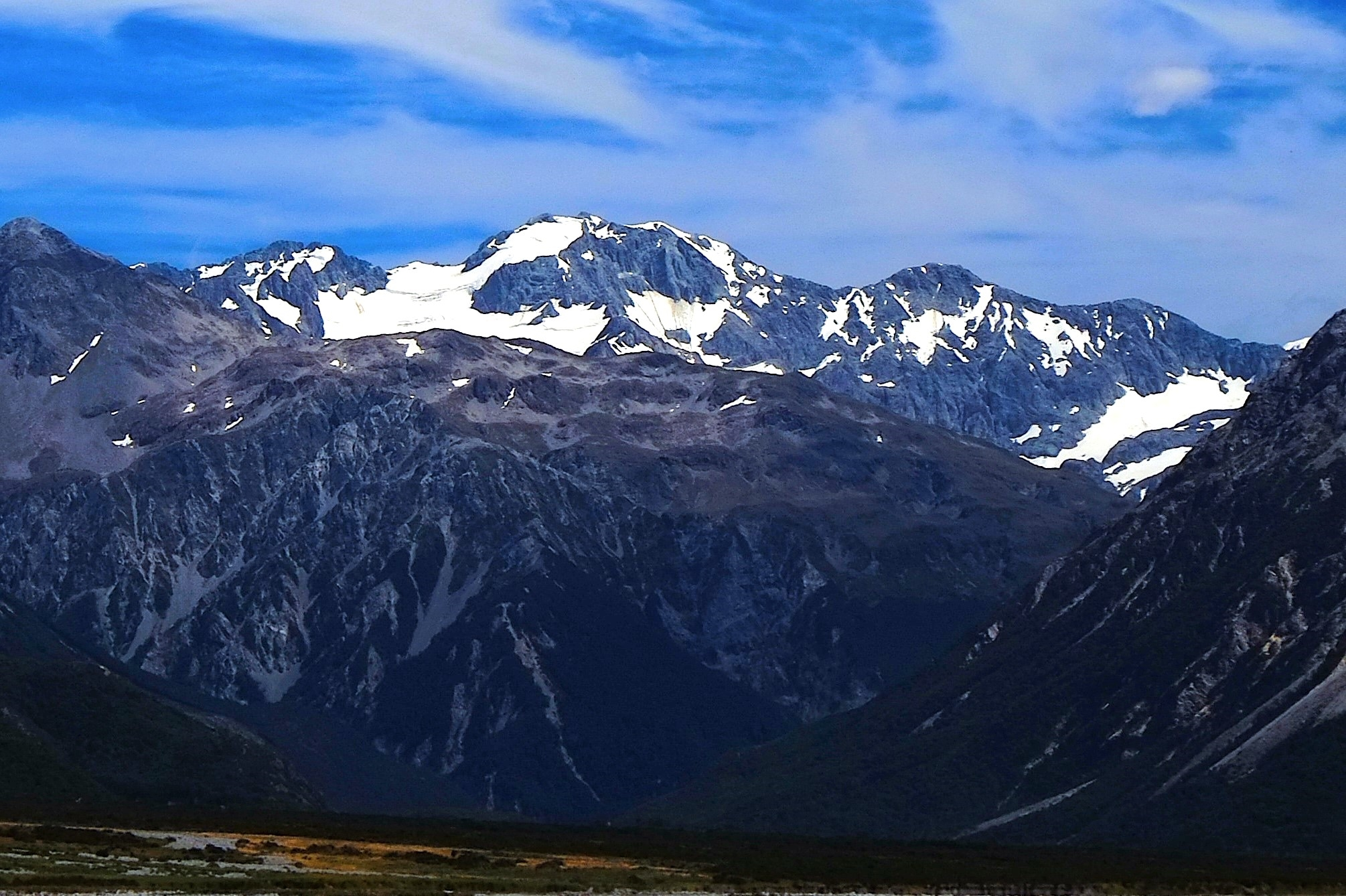
East aspect

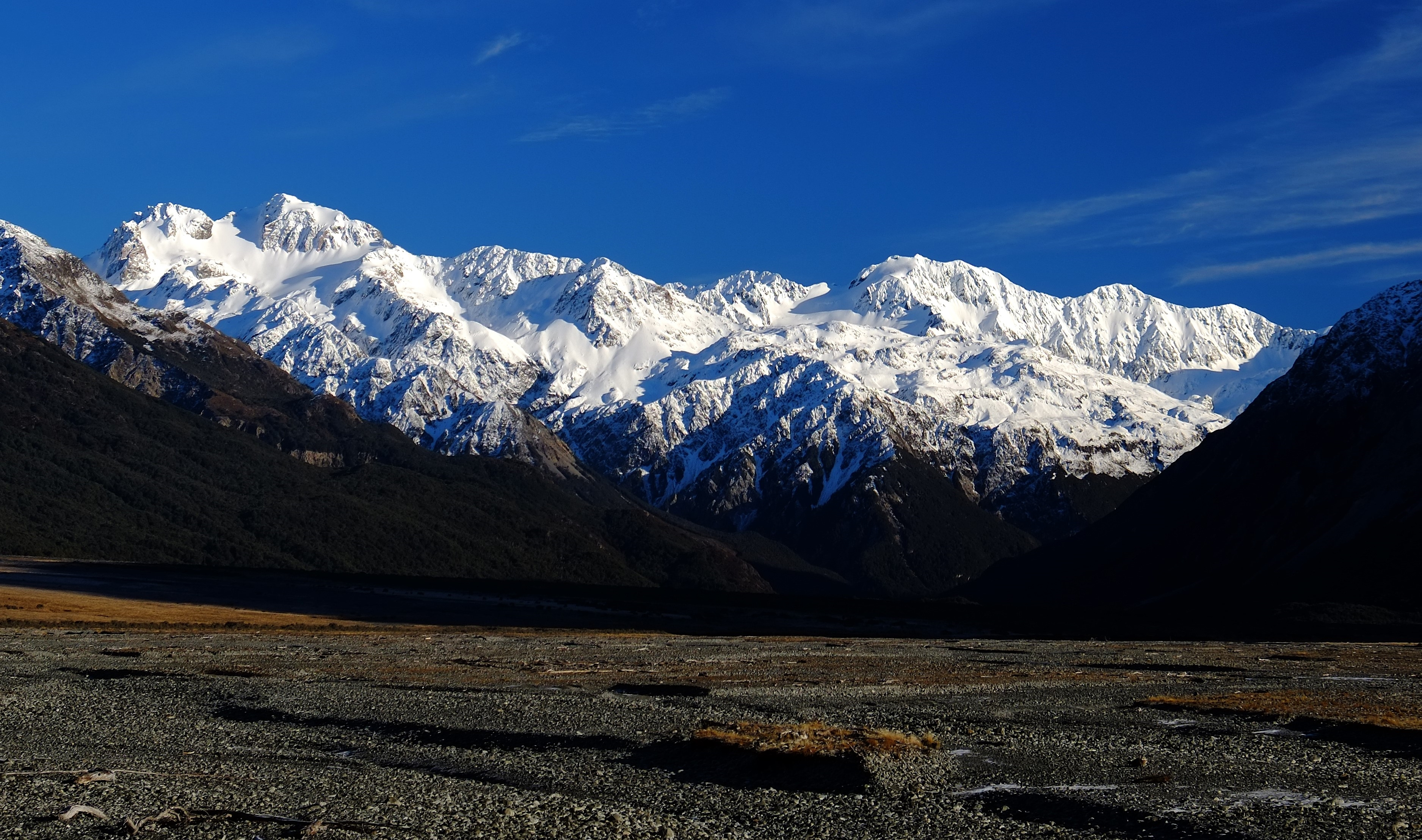
Mount Harper (left) and Mount Davie (right)

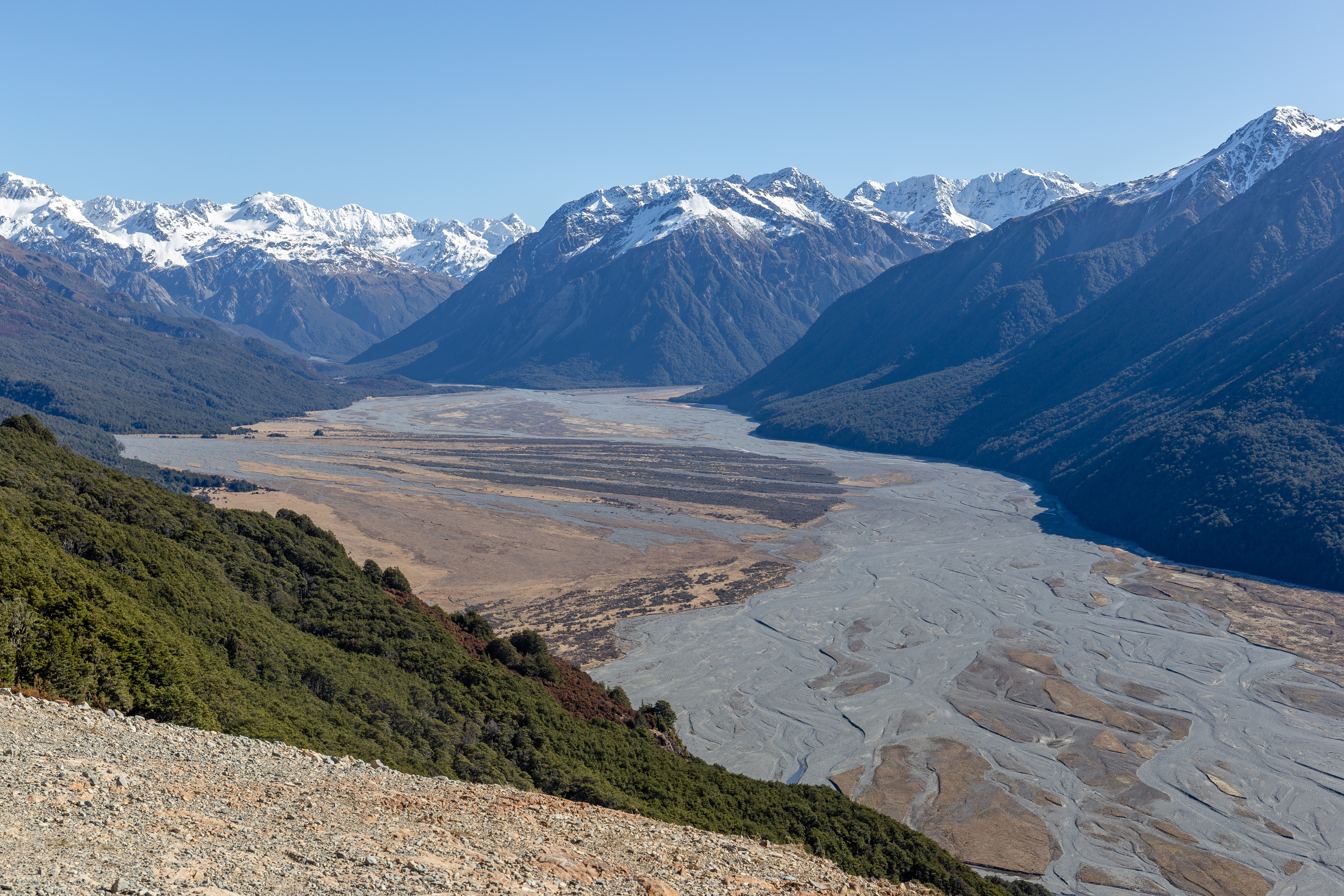
Mount Davie in the distance to left

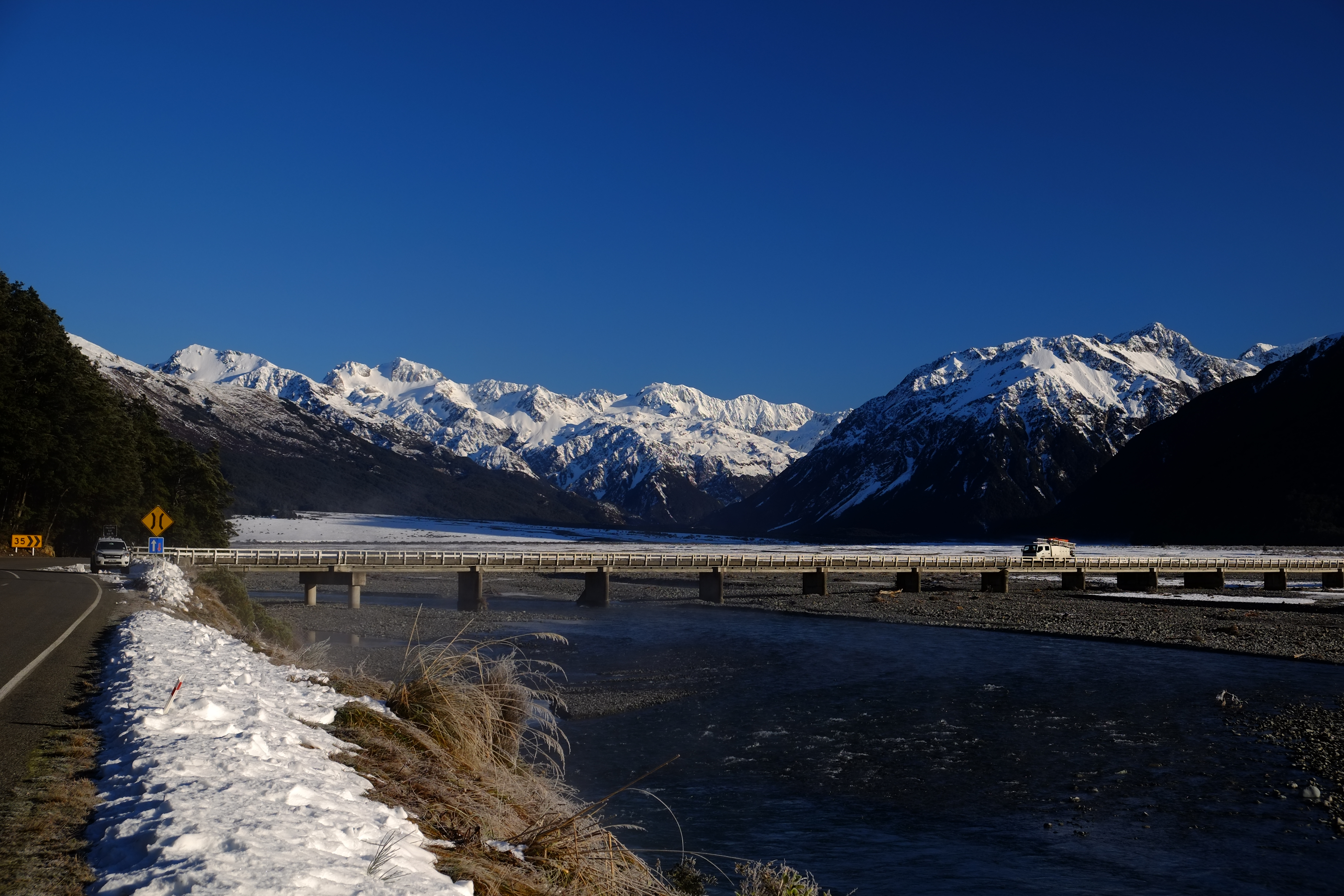
Mount Davie centred in the distance

== See also ==
- List of mountains of New Zealand by height
