= Mount Harper (Black Range, New Zealand) =

Mountain in New Zealand

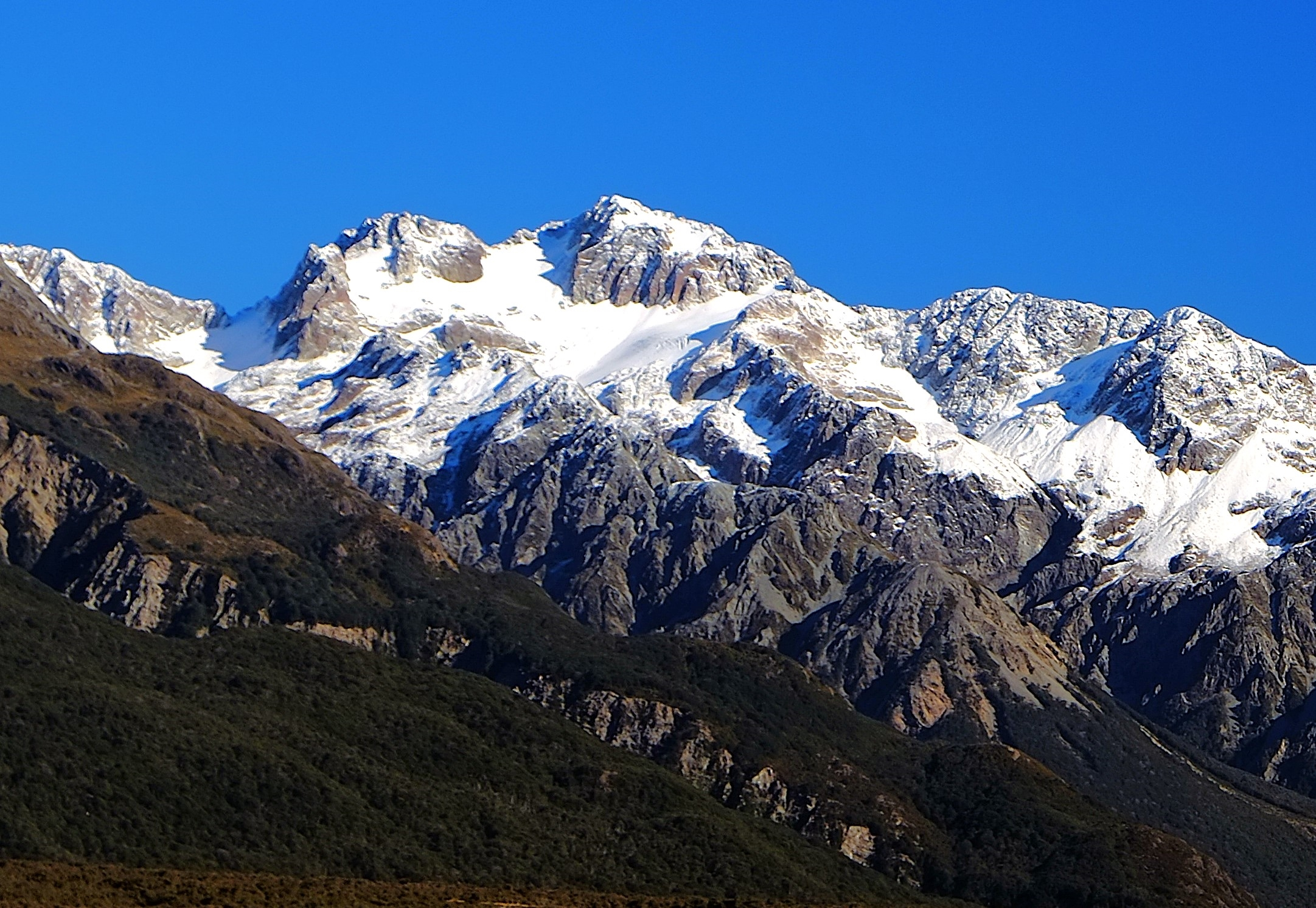
- East aspect

Highest point
- Elevation: 2,222 m (7,290 ft)
- Prominence: 242 m (794 ft)
- Isolation: 3.28 km (2.04 mi)
- Coordinates: 42.991653°S 171.413369°E

Naming
- Etymology: Arthur Paul Harper

Geography
- Location within New Zealand
- Interactive map of Mount Harper
- Location: South Island
- Country: New Zealand
- Region: Canterbury
- Protected area: Arthur's Pass National Park
- Parent range: Southern Alps; Black Range
- Topo map(s): Topo50 BV20; NZMS260 K33

Geology
- Rock age: Triassic
- Rock type: Rakaia Terrane

Climbing
- First ascent: March 1913

Mount Harper is a 2,222-metre-elevation (7,290-foot) mountain in the Black Range of the Southern Alps, in the Canterbury Region of New Zealand.

== Description ==
Mount Harper is located 120 kilometres (75 mi) northwest of Christchurch on the boundary of Arthur's Pass National Park in the South Island. It is set in the Black Range of the Southern Alps. Precipitation runoff from the mountain's southwest slope drains into the headwaters of Burnet Stream which is a tributary of the Wilberforce River, whereas all other slopes drain into tributaries of the Waimakariri River. Topographic relief is significant as the summit rises 940 metres (3,084 feet) above the White River in one kilometre. The nearest higher peak is Mount Murchison, 3.28 kilometres to the southwest. The mountain's toponym was applied in 1926 to honour Arthur Paul Harper (1865–1955), a New Zealand lawyer, mountaineer, explorer, businessman, conservationist, and for many years president of the New Zealand Alpine Club as a founding member.

== Climbing ==
Climbing routes:

- South West Ridge – C.K. Ward and Arthur Talbot – (March 1913)
- West Face
- South West Face
- Via Harper Creek
- Via Camp Spur

== Climate ==
Based on the Köppen climate classification, Mount Harper is located in a marine west coast (Cfb) climate zone, with a subpolar oceanic climate (Cfc) at the summit. Prevailing westerly winds blow moist air from the Tasman Sea onto the mountains, where the air is forced upwards by the mountains (orographic lift), causing moisture to drop in the form of rain or snow. This climate supports a glacieret on the eastern slope of this peak. The months of December through February offer the most favourable weather for viewing or climbing this peak.

== Gallery ==
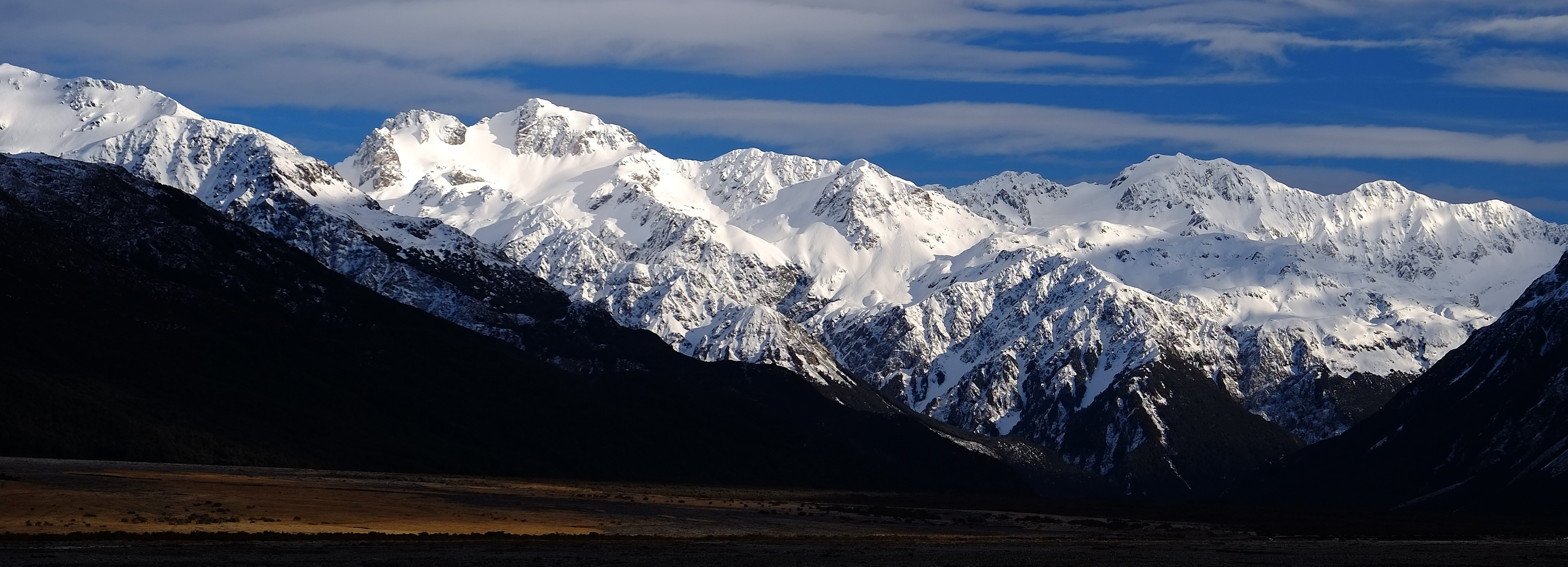
Mount Harper (left) and Mount Davie (right)

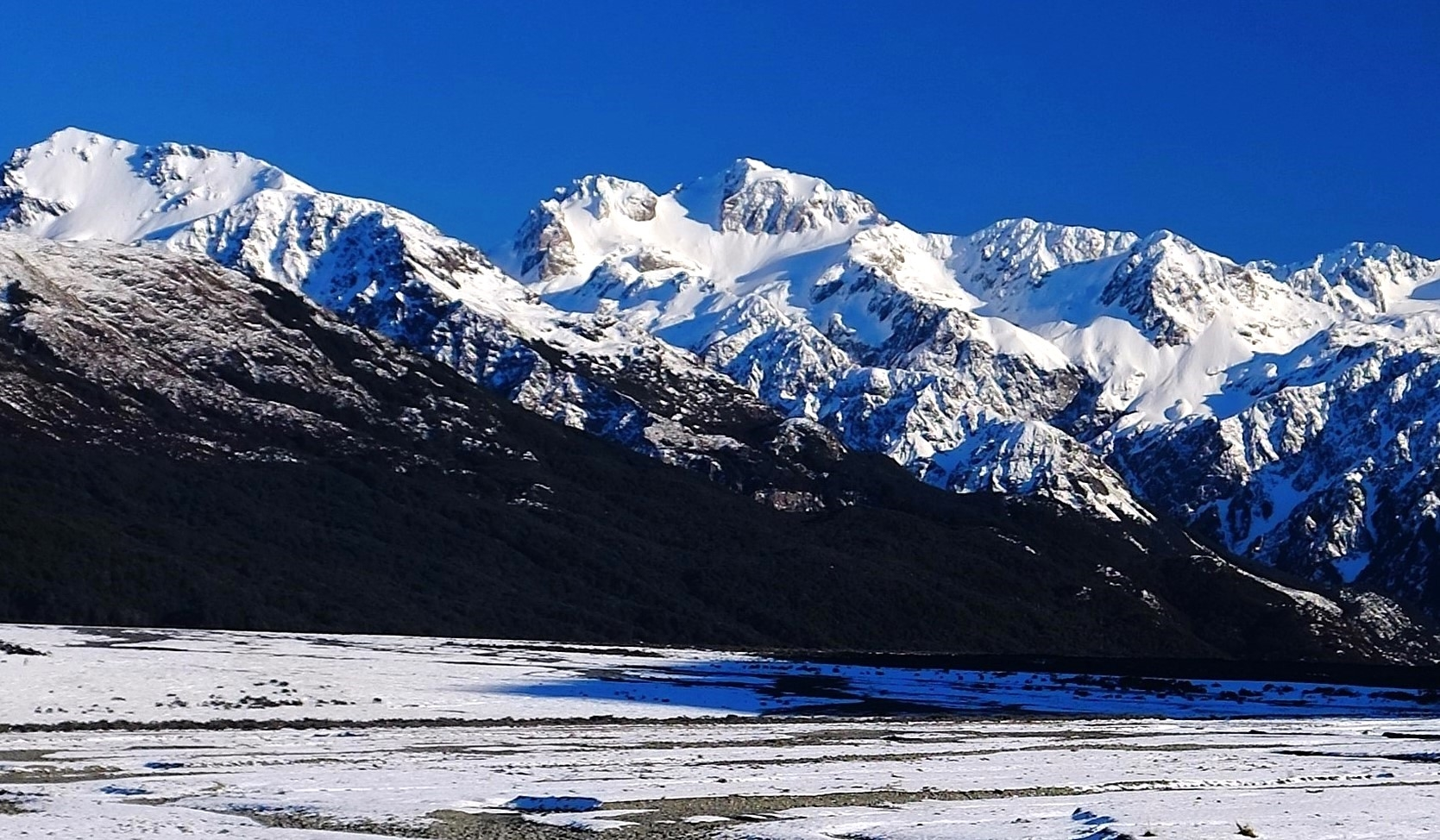
East aspect, centred

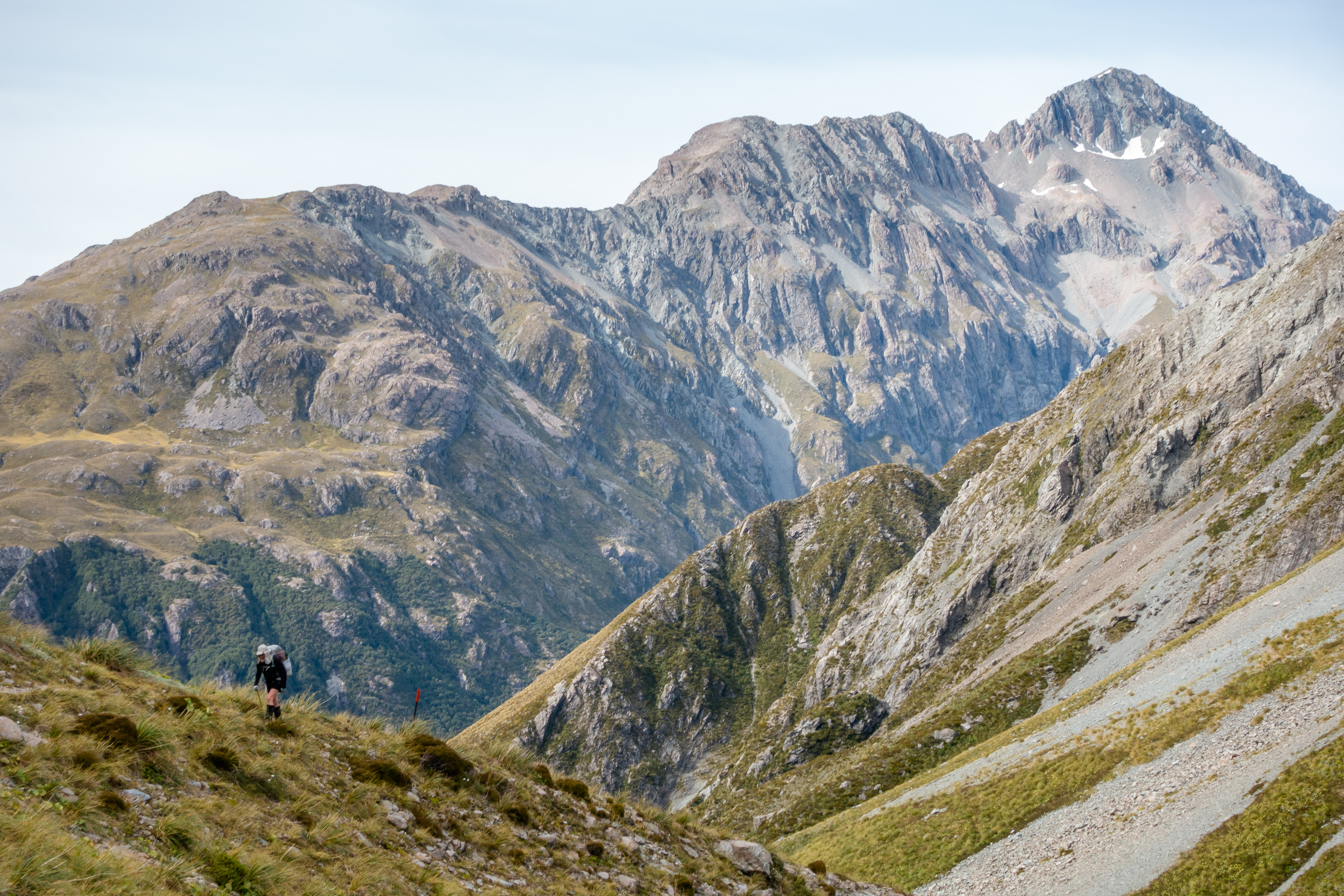
North aspect

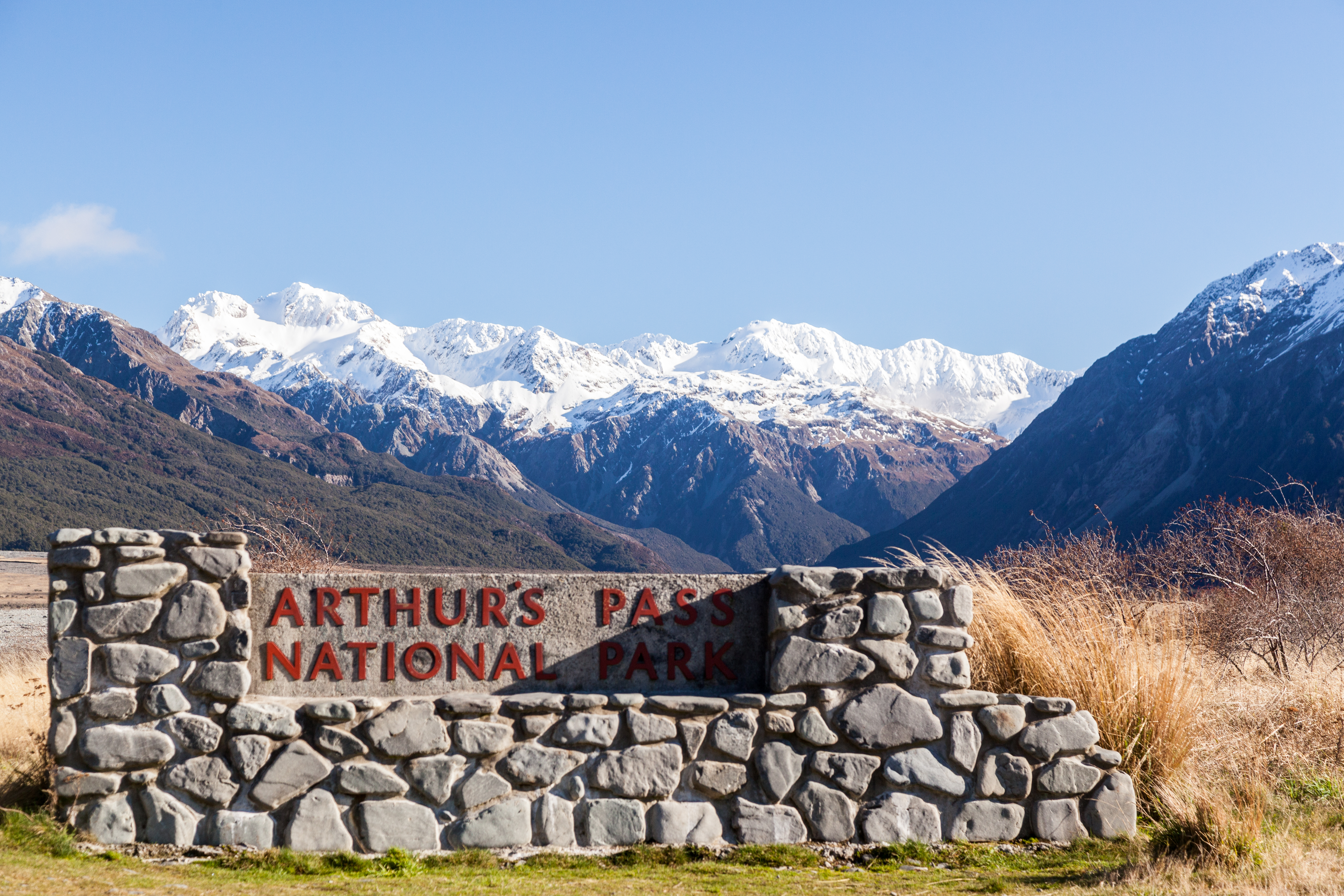
Mount Harper to left

== See also ==
- List of mountains of New Zealand by height
