= Midland Railway Bridge 42 =

Railway Bridge in Canterbury, New Zealand

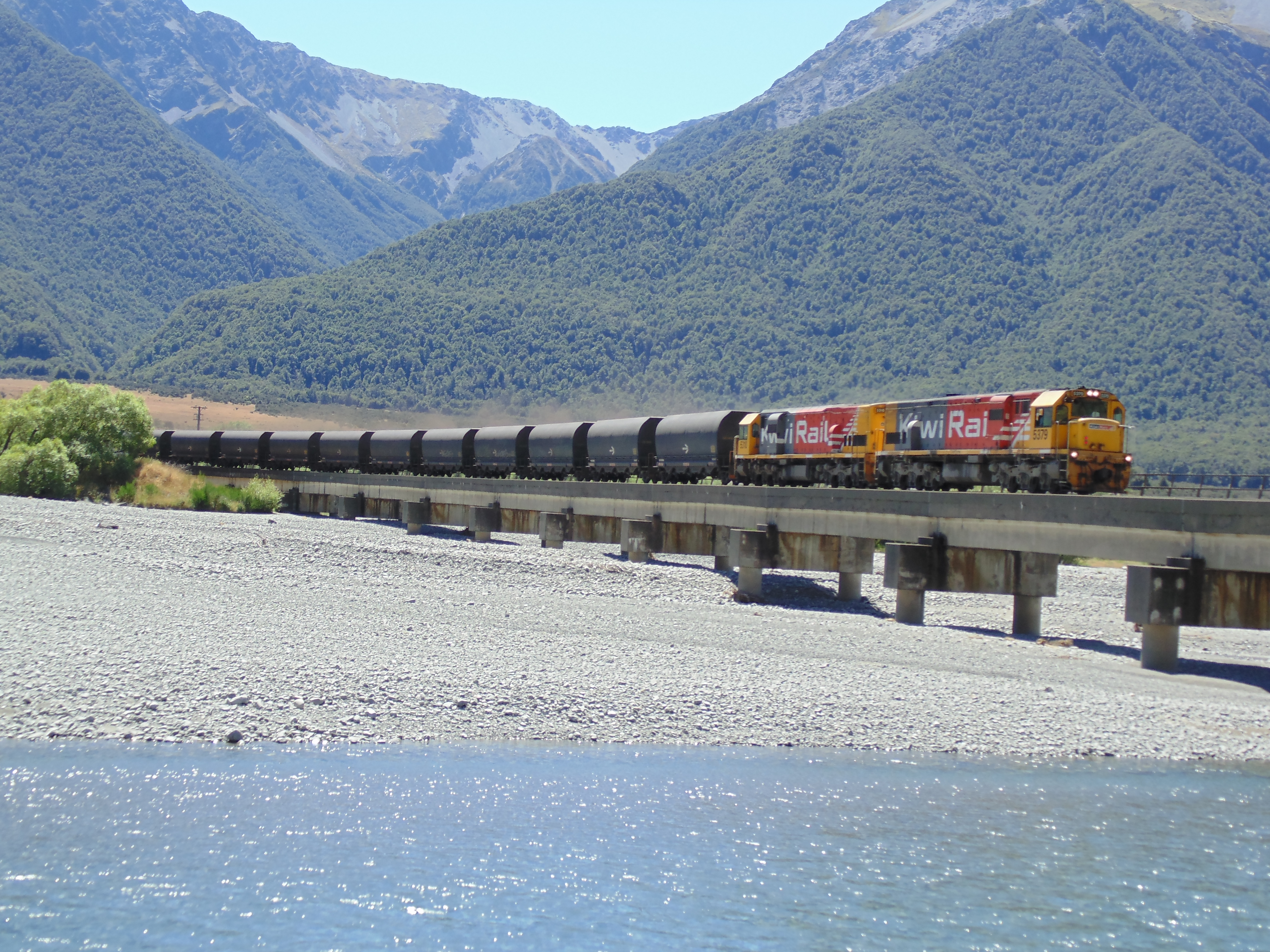
- Two DXC class locomotives crossing the bridge in 2015
- Coordinates: 43°00′40.6″S 171°42′51.8″E
- Carries: Midland Line
- Crosses: Waimakariri River
- Locale: Canterbury, Cass
- Owner: KiwiRail
- Next upstream: Bealey Bridge
- Next downstream: Mount White Bridge

Location
- Interactive map of Midland Railway Bridge 42

The Midland Railway Bridge 42, also known as simply the "Waimakariri Rail Bridge" is a single-tracked railway bridge which carries the midland line over the Waimakariri River. It is located at the confluence of Red Beech Stream and the Waimakariri River, near Arthur's Pass National Park between the localities of Cass and Bealey, in Canterbury, New Zealand. The bridge was finished in 1912 and is constructed of steel girders and concrete. It is currently owned and operated by the New Zealand state-owned rail operator KiwiRail.

The construction of the Midland Railway was a major engineering challenge and involved difficult terrain with very little use of machinery. Construction of the bridge formed a major milestone in the progress of eastern section of the railway.
