= Eyre River (New Zealand) =

Coordinates: 43°23′41″S 172°27′55″E

Location
- Country: New Zealand

Physical characteristics
- Source
  - location: Puketeraki Range
- Mouth
  - location: Waimakariri River

The Eyre River is a river in the Canterbury region of New Zealand. It arises in the Puketeraki Range and flows south-east into the Waimakariri River near Christchurch International Airport. The connection with the Waimakariri is via a diversion channel running south-west, replacing the Eyre's original easterly flow. The river is named after Edward John Eyre, the Lieutenant-Governor of New Munster from 1848 to 1853.

The river rarely carries surface water, due to the unreliability of the easterly rains which feed it.

== See also ==
- List of rivers of New Zealand
