= Bealey Bridge =

Bridge in Canterbury, New Zealand

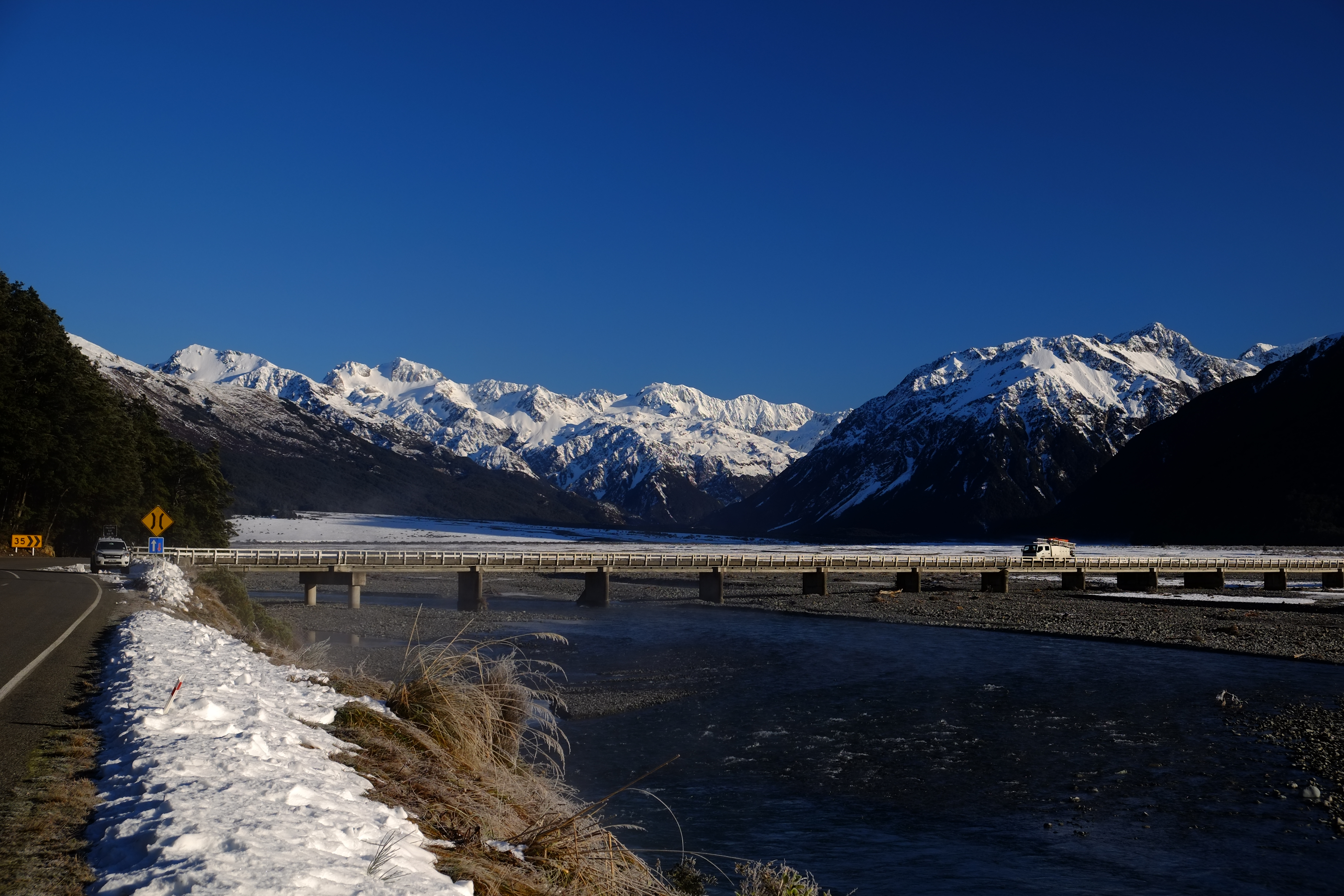
- Bealey Bridge looking west, 2015
- Coordinates: 43°01′11″S 171°35′46″E
- Carries: State Highway 73 (one lane)
- Crosses: Waimakariri River
- Locale: Arthur's Pass
- Maintained by: New Zealand Transport Agency
- Next downstream: Midland Railway Bridge 42

Characteristics
- Total length: 266.94 metres (875.8 ft)

Location
- Interactive map of Bealey Bridge

The Bealey Bridge is a road bridge located in Arthur's Pass National Park, Canterbury, New Zealand carrying State Highway 73 across the Waimakariri River. The bridge was built in 1935 and carries a single lane of traffic with one passing bay in the centre of the bridge. The bridge connects the West Coast Region of New Zealand with Canterbury as part of the Great Alpine Highway. The bridge is named for the Bealey River and settlement of Bealey, in turn named for Samuel Bealey, the 3rd Superintendent of the Canterbury Province.

== Description ==
The bridge is located roughly 9 km (5.6 mi) south-west from Arthur's Pass on the upper reaches of the Waimakariri River. As of 2010, the bridge received an average of 1365 vehicles daily.

The construction of the Bealey Bridge was conducted in 1935 and 1936 by the Public Works Department to replace more primitive crossings of the river. The bridge was initially constructed using reinforced concrete, with lead paint used on the railings and is 266.94 m (875.8 ft) long. The bridge consists of twenty spans, each supported by two reinforced concrete girders. The bridge deck is also reinforced concrete and supports a single lane of traffic with a passing bay midway along the bridge. Each span is 13.4 m (44 ft) long, with two approach spans being 13.4 m (44 ft) and 13.2 m (43 ft) in length.

At the eastern end of the bridge, a sharp horizontal curve restricts the speed of drivers entering and leaving the bridge, bringing the average speed of vehicles using the bridge to 40 km/h (25 mph), down from the official speed limit of 60 km/h (37 mph).

== History ==
=== Prospects and enthusiasm ===
The first reference to the idea of a "Bealey Bridge" crossing the Waimakariri River appears in The Press on 22 May 1865, detailing the report of Arthur Dudley Dobson on the route through Arthur's Pass. Notably, the term "Bealey Bridge" was also used throughout the latter half of the 19th century to refer to the White Bridge bridging the Bealey River North of Arthur's Pass.

On 13 June 1933, the Automobile Association sent a "strong letter" to the Main Highways Board and the Public Works Department supporting the idea of a bridge over the Waimakariri in the present-day location of the Bealey Bridge, citing that communications between Canterbury and the West Coast would be completely cut off should the Otira Tunnel ever be closed. The Main Highways Board had responded by January 1934, promising "sympathetic consideration" of the bridge. This response was not satisfactory to supporters of the bridge who claimed it was a vital necessity for national security and the connection to the West Coast. This resulted in the formation of the Canterbury and Westland Highways Association which continued to press the Public Works Department for the erection of the bridge. The bridge proved a controversial topic in Canterbury, with several letters to the Editor in January 1934 expressing discontent with the agitation of the highway associations to have the bridge constructed and that highway funds could be better spent on more urgently needed roads in Canterbury, including the Rolleston Road.

=== Construction ===
Progress was first made towards construction in July 1934, when on a visit to the South Island the Main Highways Board decided the Bealey Bridge to be necessary. On 25 July, F. Langbein the District Engineer of the Public Works Department for Christchurch stated that instructions had been received to begin construction of test piles across the Waimakariri River. Preliminary work on the approaches to the bridge, and protections from flooding began on 4 October, while the test piles made clear that a reinforced concrete beam structure should be the type of bridge employed across the river. Preliminary work concluded in early December, and work on the bridge itself began in the new year of 1935.

On 6 April, the only major accident during construction occurred when a workman John Sutherland fell into the river from the bank and broke his neck in the process. He fell 150 ft (46 m) to his death while trying to help a fellow workman who had tripped and fallen over a bank. The initial workman who had tripped suffered only minor injuries, while the body of Sutherland was recovered from the river some hours later.

By May, the design for the bridge had been completed and tenders were released by the Public Works Department for the construction of an 880 foot bridge with twenty concrete spans. A deadline of 9 months to complete the bridge was provided and the Department wished work to begin as soon as possible. Materials used in the construction of the bridge included 1,688 ft (515 m) of reinforced concrete piling, 679 cubic yards (519.1 cubic metres) of concrete and 60 tons of reinforcing steel. In June, the tender was awarded to the firm W. Clark and Sons of Kaiapoi for construction of the bridge for the price of £5000.

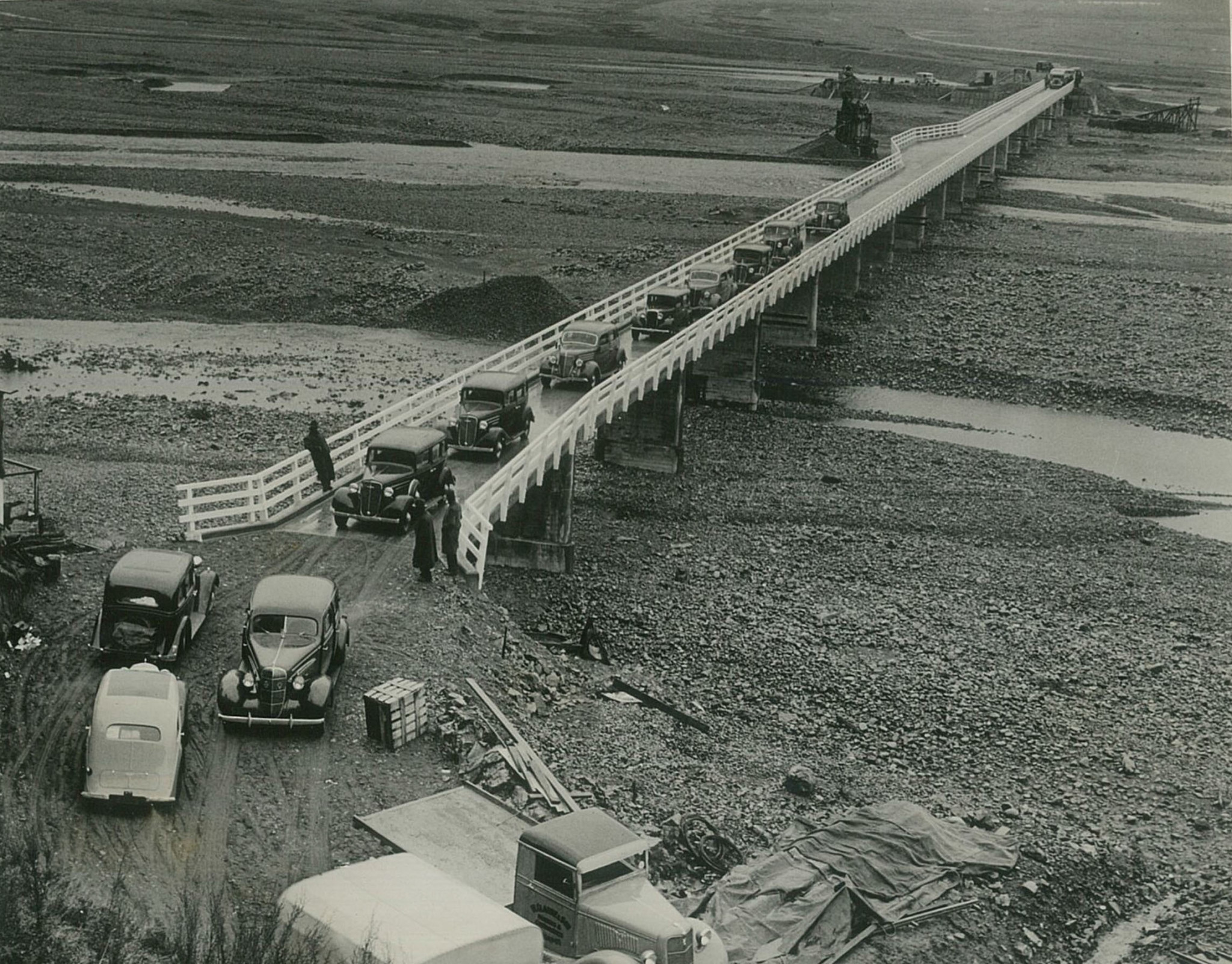
Traffic crosses the Bealey Bridge for the first time in September 1936

Throughout construction, there was much frustration from residents of the West Coast and Canterbury. Many believed that construction was not progressing fast enough, and that the bridge would not be completed by the 9 month deadline. In January, the issue was raised to the Automotive Association by a representative from Greymouth, however, no action was taken by the Automotive Association to keep an eye on the speed of construction as it was believed the contractors would meet the deadline.

On 13 September, Minister of Public Works Bob Semple officially opened the Bealey Bridge to traffic. 15 cars passed over the bridge from east to west, marking "a new chapter" in transport between the West Coast and Canterbury. The visit of Bob Semple to the highway also drew attention to the poor condition of crossings across several other rivers, including the Bruce River. In his speech at the opening of the bridge, the minister pledged that he would not rest until more rivers had been bridged and the highway was in a better condition.
