= Mount White Bridge =

Bridge in New Zealand

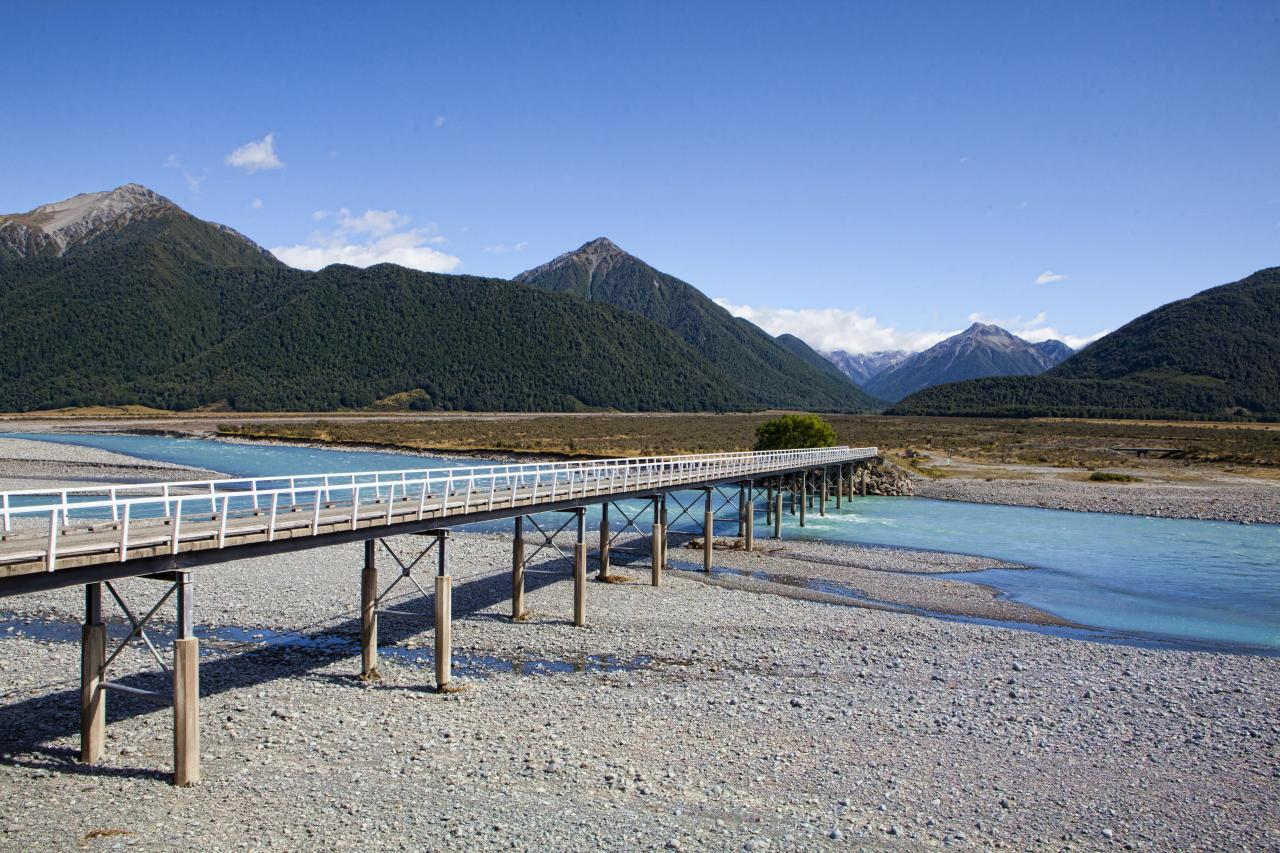
- Mount White Bridge looking North, 2010
- Coordinates: 43°00′20.3″S 171°44′49″E
- Carries: Mount White Road (one lane)
- Crosses: Waimakariri River
- Locale: Canterbury, Cass
- Maintained by: Selwyn District Council
- Next upstream: Midland Railway Bridge 42
- Next downstream: Waimakariri Gorge Bridge

The Mount White Bridge is a single-lane, gravel sealed bridge crossing the Waimakariri River in Canterbury, New Zealand. The bridge is a popular destination for tourism and sight-seeing, as well as being a key location in the annual Coast to Coast race. The bridge serves as the access point for the 120 hectare Mount White Station, as well as several Department of Conservation tracks, shelters, and facilities.

== History ==
The Mount White Bridge is a timber truss bridge with steel hardware, built at some point before 1885 and after 1878, with the exact date unknown.

On 1 May 1878, a request by the Upper Waimakariri Road Board for tenders for metalling 91 chains of Mount White Road, the road which exists solely to serve the bridge and the station, appears in The Press, the earliest sign of activity regarding the road and bridge. Such requests are repeated in newspapers throughout late April and early May 1878.

Despite this, an incident of drowning in 1878 at the current site of the bridge implies that no such bridge existed at that time, and this is confirmed by a tender for contractors Issued in the Lyttelton Times on 11 October 1877, in which the tender of Mr. Michael Vaughan is accepted to the tune of £350.

No further reference to its construction can be found until reference is made to a bridge "in course of erection" crossing the river at Mount White in 1883, followed by a reference to a completed bridge in 1890.

In 1911, a significant flood affected the bridge, resulting in its elevation of 6 feet and 6 inches, to avoid further damage to the bridge and the adjacent midland railway line.

== Significance ==
The bridge serves as the main access point to Mount White Station, a large high-country sheep run and, in the modern day, tourism destination. Additionally, the bridge is an access point for large swathes of the Arthur's Pass National Park, including the popular Hawdon-Edwards route, Minchin Pass route, Casey Saddle-Binser Saddle route, and the Hawdon Shelter and Andrew Shelter campsites.

The midland railway line crosses the southern end of the bridge at a level crossing, where a halt operated between 1977 and 2008, allowing passengers to disembark to access the campsites, tramping tracks and station.

Despite its service as a park utility, the bridge falls outside the national park, instead a part of the Hawdon Flats reserve. The Department of Conservation address this in the 2007 Arthur's Pass National Park management plan, stating: "To clarify road administrative responsibilities, it is desirable that formed roads [Mount White Bridge] are legalised and/or accepted as Department facilities." As of 2025, no such action has been taken and the national park boundaries still exclude the Mount White Bridge.

The Mount White Bridge formerly formed the beginning of the Coast to Coast kayaking leg, however the course has since shifted and it is no longer used as a checkpoint.
