= Esk River (Canterbury) =

Coordinates: 43°04′46″S 171°58′30″E

- Location of the mouth within New Zealand

Location
- Country: New Zealand

Physical characteristics
- Source
  - location: Dampier Range
- Mouth
  - location: Waimakariri River
- Length: 36 km (22 mi)

Canterbury's Esk River is a tributary of the Waimakariri River. It rises in the Dampier Range near Esk Head, and flows southwest on the western side of the Puketeraki Range to reach the upper Waimakariri some 20 kilometres (12 mi) north of Springfield.

Brown and rainbow trout are available in the river, but fishing is restricted.

Its tributaries include the Pūkio Stream, which prior to the Pleistocene epoch acted as an outlet for the Cox River into the Esk.

== See also ==
- Esk River (Hawke's Bay)
- List of rivers of New Zealand
