= New Zealand Geographic Board =

New Zealand geographical naming agencies

New Zealand Geographic Board Ngā Pou Taunaha o Aotearoa

Agency overview
- Formed: 1946; 80 years ago
- Preceding agency: Honorary Geographic Board of New Zealand
- Jurisdiction: New Zealand
- Headquarters: Radio New Zealand House, 155 The Terrace, Wellington 41°17′06″S 174°46′28″E
- Minister responsible: Chris Penk, Minister for Land Information
- Agency executive: Anselm Haanen, Chairperson
- Parent agency: Toitū Te Whenua Land Information New Zealand

The New Zealand Geographic Board Ngā Pou Taunaha o Aotearoa (NZGB) is the authority over geographical and hydrographic names within New Zealand and its territorial waters. This includes the naming of small urban settlements, localities, mountains, lakes, rivers, waterfalls, harbours and natural features and may include researching local Māori names. It has named many geographical features in the Ross Sea region of Antarctica. It has no authority to alter street names (a local body responsibility) or the name of any country.

The board was established by the New Zealand Geographic Board Act 1946, which has since been replaced by the New Zealand Geographic Board (Ngā Pou Taunaha o Aotearoa) Act 2008. Although an independent institution, it is responsible to the Minister for Land Information.

The NZGB secretariat is part of Toitū Te Whenua Land Information New Zealand (LINZ) and provides the board with administrative and research assistance and advice.

The New Zealand Geographic Board succeeded an honorary Geographical Advisory Board that had been set up in 1924 under the direction of the Minister of Land. That board had seven members, including Herbert Williams, Elsdon Best and Johannes C. Andersen.

== Membership ==
Under the New Zealand Geographic Board (Ngā Pou Taunaha o Aotearoa) Act 2008, the board comprises the Surveyor-General of New Zealand (appointed by LINZ) as chair, the National Hydrographer (appointed by LINZ) and eight other members nominated by the Minister for Land Information. The ministerial appointees include two persons recommended by the Minister of Māori Development and representatives of Te Rūnanga o Ngāi Tahu, the New Zealand Geographical Society, the Federated Mountain Clubs of NZ, and Local Government New Zealand.

As of November 2020, the ten board members are:

1. Anselm Haanen (Surveyor-General, Chairperson)
2. Shaun Barnett (nominated by Federated Mountain Clubs)
3. Jenni Vernon (nominated by the Minister for Land Information
4. Gary Shane Te Ruki (nominated by the Minister for Māori Development)
5. Robin Kearns (nominated by the New Zealand Geographical Society Inc)
6. Chanel Clarke (nominated by the Minister for Māori Development)
7. Adam Greenland (National Hydrographer at LINZ)
8. Professor Merata Kawharu (nominated by the Minister for Land Information)
9. Bonita Bigham (nominated by Local Government New Zealand)
10. Paulette Tamati-Elliffe (nominated by Te Rūnanga o Ngāi Tahu)

== Notable actions ==
=== 2013 formalisation of island names ===
The NZGB discovered in 2009 that the names of the North Island and South Island had never been formalised, and names and alternative names were formalised in 2013. This set the names as North Island or Te Ika-a-Māui, and South Island or Te Waipounamu. For each island, either its English or Māori name can be used, or both can be used together.

=== 2016 renaming of landmarks ===
In 2015, a member of the New Zealand public wrote to the New Zealand Geographic Board complaining about three place names in Canterbury in the South Island that use the word "nigger": Nigger Hill, Niggerhead, and Nigger Stream. A public consultation was set up with 223 to 61 responses in favour of changing the name. Following consultations with the Ngāi Tahu tribe who reside in the area, the names Kānuka Hills and Tawhai Hill were suggested as replacements. This was in reference to the kānuka and tawhai tree. The stream was somewhat more complicated; it was originally proposed to be renamed to "Steelhead Stream", but eventually the Māori name for the Carex secta (a tussock grass that grows in the area), Pūkio Stream, was favored instead. The proposed change of name was accepted with the Land Information New Zealand Minister Louise Upston stating "These names reflect a time when attitudes towards this word were markedly different to what they are now. It is a word that is clearly offensive to most people today, so I am pleased to make this decision." The name change was made official on 15 December 2016 after being published in the New Zealand Gazette.

== Powers ==
Under Section 32 of the 2008 Act, official place names must be used in all official documents, a term which includes both documents produced by government entities and some documents produced by non-government entities, such as scientific publications and information for tourists. Section 33 of the Act enables enforcement of the requirement by granting the New Zealand Geographic Board the right to seek an injunction from the high court with heavy penalties for non-compliance, but as of 2018 this power has not been used, with the Board instead preferring to liaise directly with offenders to correct non-compliance.

These powers have proven ineffective in some cases, such as with overseas open source services such as Google Maps.

== See also ==
- New Zealand Antarctic Place-Names Committee
- New Zealand place names
