= Waimakariri Gorge Bridge =

Bridge in Canterbury, New Zealand

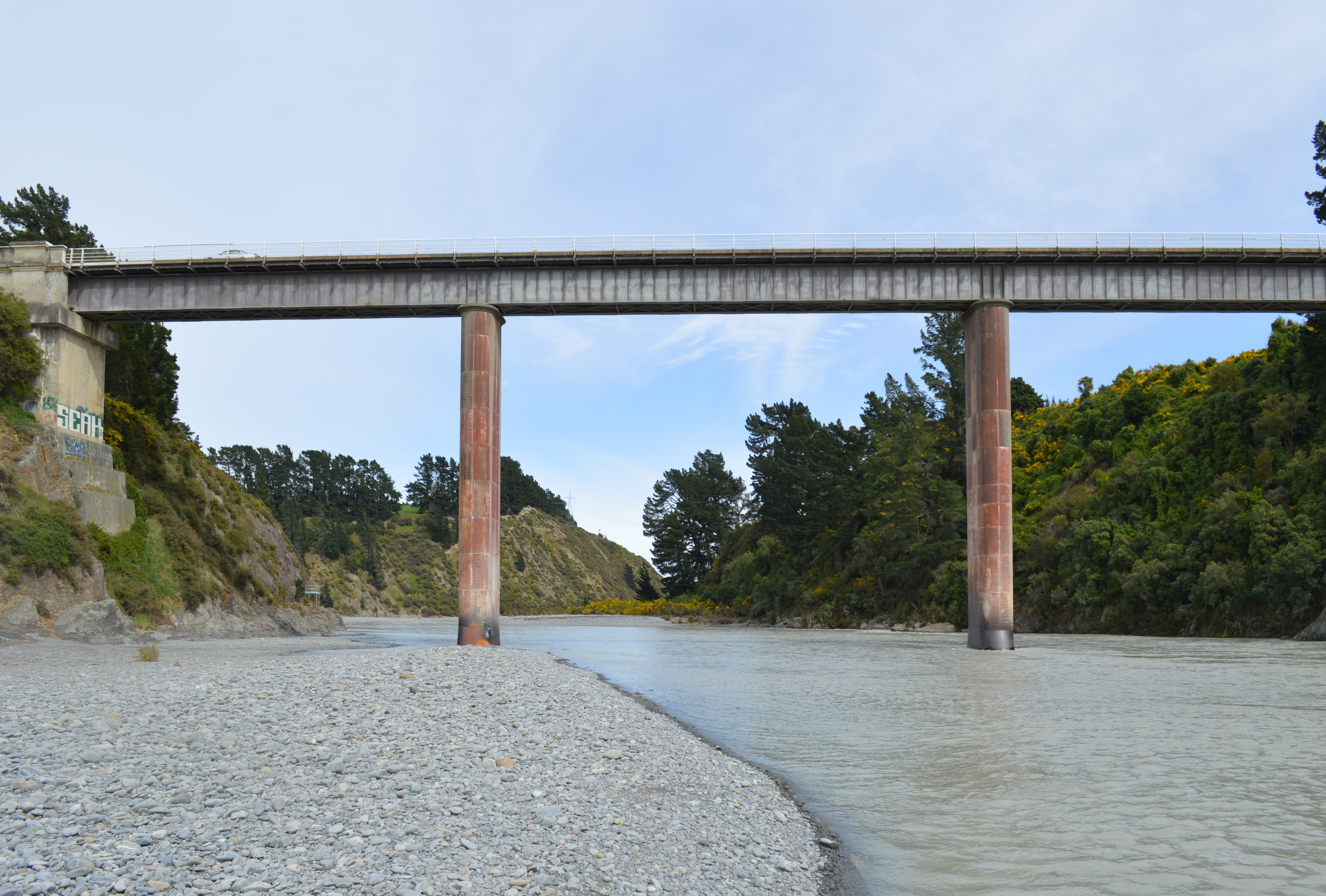
- Waimakariri Gorge Bridge viewed from the riverbed, 2013
- Coordinates: 43°21′35.2″S 172°03′01.4″E
- Carries: Inland Scenic Route, Depot Road (one lane); Oxford-Sheffield Branch Railway (Until 1933)
- Crosses: Waimakariri River
- Locale: Canterbury, Bexley
- Maintained by: Selwyn, Waimakariri District Councils
- Heritage status: Historic Place Category 2
- Preceded by: Mount White Bridge
- Followed by: Waimakariri River Bridge

Characteristics
- Design: Girder
- Material: Iron
- Pier construction: Iron, Concrete
- Total length: 100 metres (330 ft)
- Height: 33 metres (108 ft)
- No. of spans: 3

The Waimakariri Gorge Bridge is a bridge located on the Waimakariri River in Canterbury, New Zealand. The bridge connects the Selwyn and Waimakariri districts as it bridges the Waimakariri Gorge between the towns of Sheffield and Oxford, while the bridge itself lies in the locality of Bexley. The bridge carries the Inland Scenic Route and is one of seven bridges over the river, five of which carry road vehicles. It is the oldest bridge over the Waimakariri River.

== Description ==
The Waimakariri Gorge Bridge is a mid-victorian high-level three span iron girder bridge supported by two iron piers. The bridge is constructed out of iron, concrete and Castle Hill Stone, with the iron piers reinforced with concrete.

The piers rest on two concrete abutments of "great thickness" while the bridge is built into the solid rock of either side of the gorge. The bridge contains three spans of 29 metres, 33.5 metres, 38 metres.

== History ==
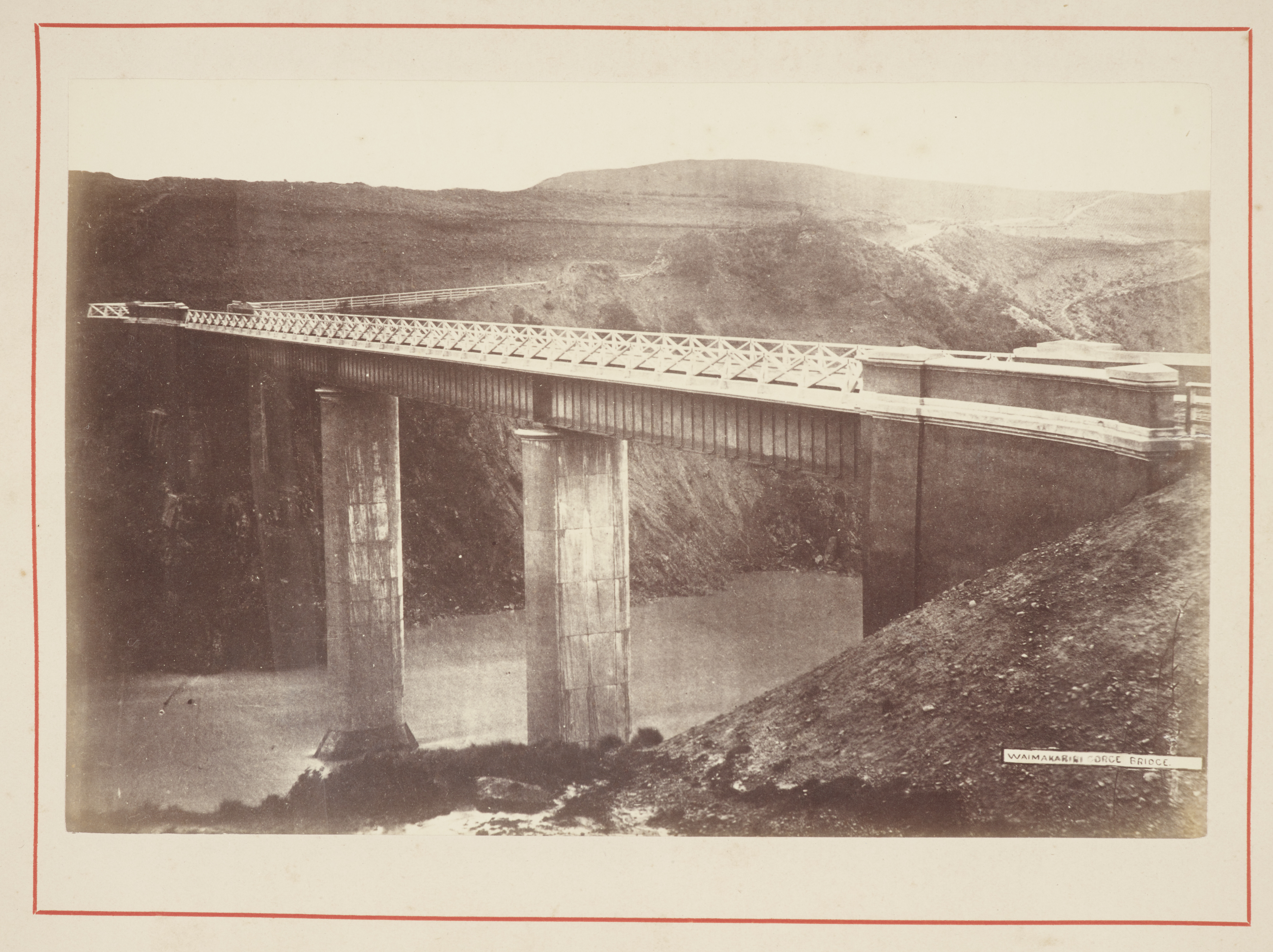
Waimakariri Gorge Bridge, 1877

Prior to the bridge, a self-acting double punt ferry operated beginning in April 1872, which ceased when bridge construction began in 1876.

A bridge over the gorge was decided in 1875, much to the joy of the locals. Christchurch Mayor Frederick Hobbs wrote a letter to the editor of The Press on the 10th of May, 1875, expressing his discontent with the project:

"Sir, There is the sum of £21,528 for a bridge at the gorge of the Waimakariri. Now, Sir, is this bridge required for years to come? Can we afford to build it for the accommodation of perhaps 20 individuals, when thousands are crying out for sanitary measures to prevent the spread of sickness and death all around us?"

The bridge was designed by HP Higginson and constructed by contractor William Stocks for completion in 1877. HP Higginson had previously worked in Russia, India, and Mauritius before moving to New Zealand in 1872.

William Stocks received a tender of £9600 for the construction of the bridge, although the construction was not without issue. The first pier was washed away due to not being sunk in far enough, losing sixty tons of Iron. On April 17 1876, a Lost and Found notice was lodged with The Press regarding "20 to 30 pieces of sawn Oregon and Kauri Timber; also, about half a dozen Wheelbarrows, and other items of contractors’ plant," being lost to a flood of the river.

A railway line was initially laid over the bridge, which operated the Oxford to Sheffield Branch Railway between 1884 and 1933, when the line closed. Just before closure of the bridge, it was bought off of the Railway Department by the Main Highways Board, and continues to be operated as a road bridge.

The bridge has long served as a popular site seeing and day trip location from Christchurch, with "picnic parties" being commonplace in the early 20th century, and excursions being offered as early as 1885.

On the 23rd of June, 1983, Heritage New Zealand classed the bridge as a Category 2 Historic Place.
