= White River (New Zealand) =

River in the South Island of New Zealand

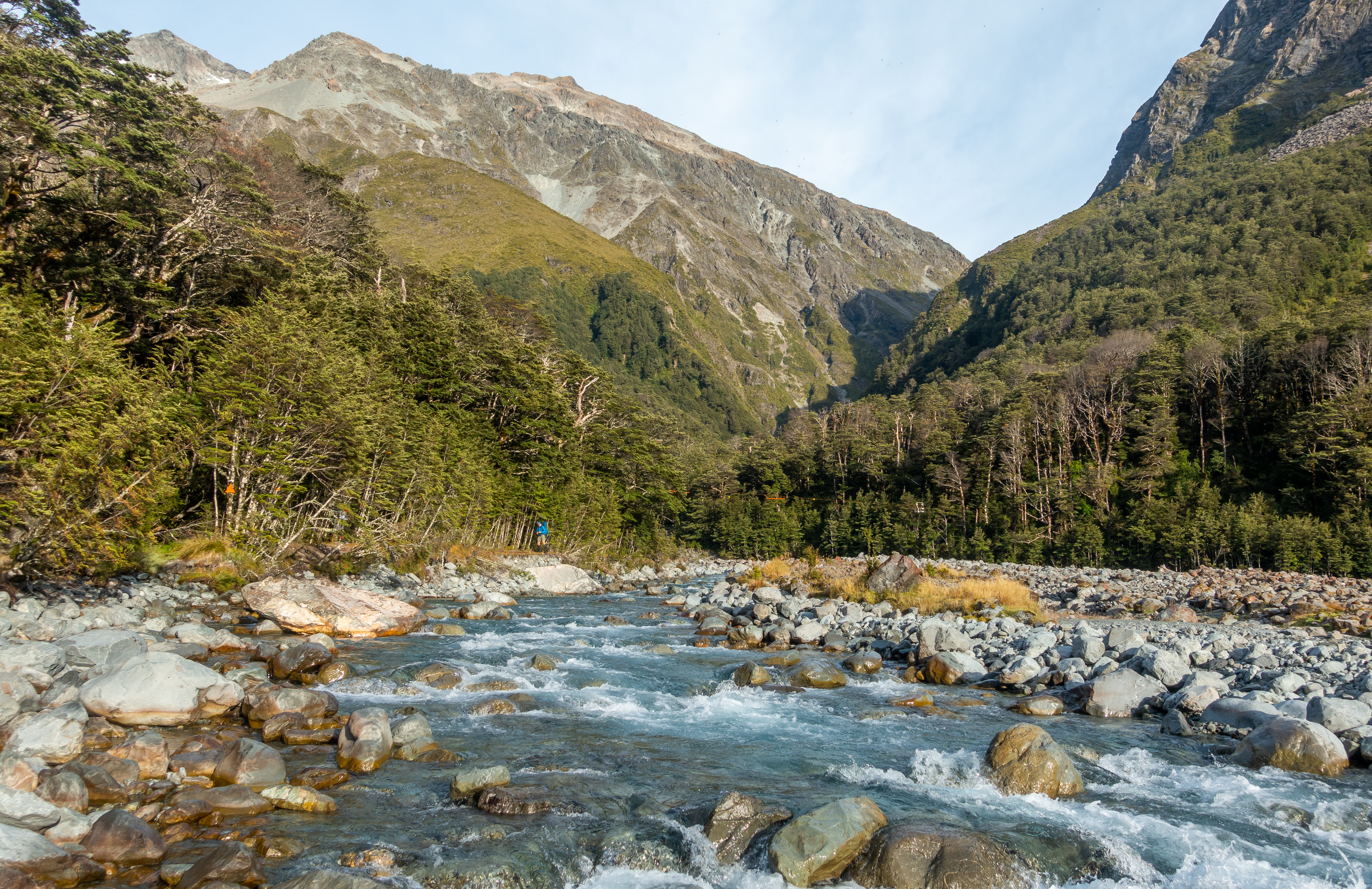
- White River
- Route of the White River
- Mouth of the White River White River (New Zealand) (South Island)

Location
- Country: New Zealand

Physical characteristics
- Source: White Glacier
  - coordinates: 42.9941°S 171.3918°E
- Mouth
  - location: Waimakariri River
  - coordinates: 42°57′28″S 171°27′00″E

Basin features
- Progression: White River → Waimakariri River → Pegasus Bay → Pacific Ocean
- Tributaries
  - left: Taipoiti River

The White River is a river in the South Island of New Zealand.

It drains from the eastern flanks of the Southern Alps / Kā Tiritiri o te Moana into the Waimakariri River. It is accessible by getting to Klondike Corner on State Highway 73, following the Waimakariri up to Carrington Hut, and turning west. The most common reason for travelling up the White river is to get to Barker Hut, a base for climbing Mounts Murchison, Wakeman and Harper. Following the river to its source takes the traveller to White Col.
