= Poulter River =

River in Arthur's Pass National Park, New Zealand

- Route of the Poulter River
- Mouth of the Poulter River Poulter River (South Island)

Location
- Country: New Zealand

Physical characteristics
- Source: Mount Koeti
  - coordinates: 42.79055°S 171.77485°E
- Mouth
  - location: Waimakariri River
  - coordinates: 43°04′21″S 171°54′55″E
- Length: 44 km (27 mi)

Basin features
- Progression: Poulter River → Waimakariri River → Pegasus Bay → Pacific Ocean
- Tributaries
  - left: Minchin Stream, Thompson Stream, Ranger Stream, Fenwick Stream, Cleland Stream, Poulter River East Branch, Turnbull Stream, Boundary Stream
  - right: Chasm Stream, Enchanted Stream, Trudge Stream, Casey Stream, Mount Brown Creek, Pete Stream

The Poulter River is a river of the Canterbury region of New Zealand's South Island. The Poulter rises on the southern slopes of Mount Koeti in Arthur's Pass National Park, flowing predominantly southwest to reach the Waimakariri River 15 kilometres (9 mi) east of Cass.

== See also ==
- List of rivers of New Zealand
