= Waimakariri River =

River in Canterbury, New Zealand

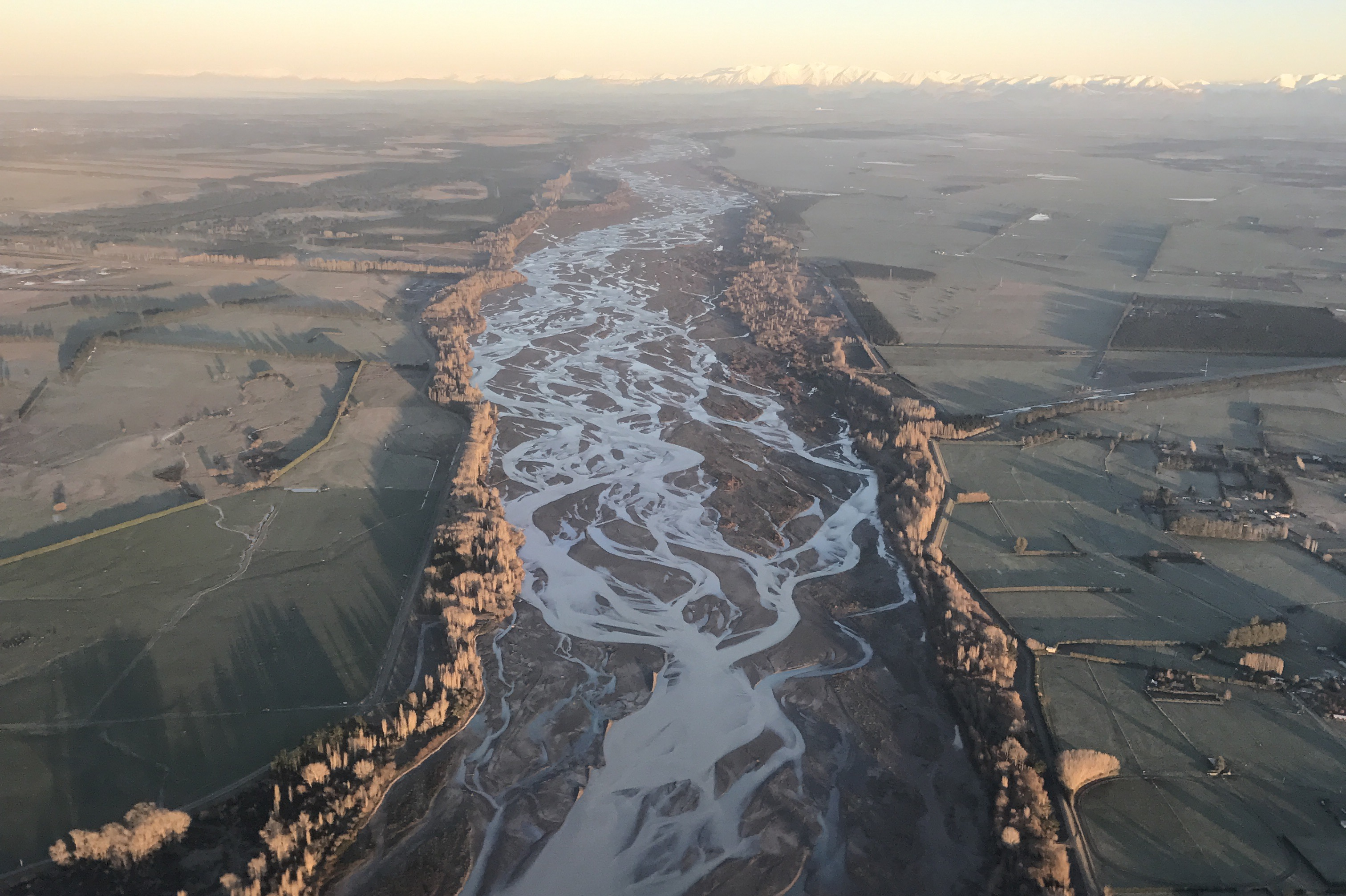
- View of the Waimakariri River looking towards the Southern Alps
- Interactive map of the Waimakariri River
- Etymology: From Māori wai (water) and makariri (cold)

Location
- Country: New Zealand
- Region: Canterbury

Physical characteristics
- Source: Southern Alps, near Mount Rolleston
  - location: Southern Alps, Canterbury
  - coordinates: 42°54′13″S 171°29′48″E
  - elevation: 1,535 m (5,036 ft)
- Mouth: Brooklands Lagoon, Pacific Ocean
  - location: near Kaiapoi
  - coordinates: 43°23′26″S 172°42′29″E
  - elevation: 0 m (0 ft)
- Length: 151 km (94 mi)
- Discharge
  - average: 76 m^{3}/s (2,700 cu ft/s)

Basin features
- Tributaries
  - left: Bealey River, Poulter River, Esk River, Eyre River, Kaiapoi River
  - right: White River, Broken River, Kowai River, Styx River
- Bridges: Bealey Bridge, Midland Railway Bridge 42, Mount White Bridge, Waimakariri Gorge Bridge, Waimakariri Motorway Bridge, Old Highway Bridge (Main North Road), Main North Railway Bridge 17

The Waimakariri River is one of the largest rivers in Canterbury, on the eastern coast of New Zealand's South Island. It flows for 151 kilometres (94 mi) in a generally southeastward direction from the Southern Alps across the Canterbury Plains to the Pacific Ocean.

The river rises on the eastern flanks of the Southern Alps, eight kilometres southwest of Arthur's Pass. For much of its upper reaches, the river is braided, with wide shingle beds. As the river approaches the Canterbury Plains, it passes through a belt of mountains, and is forced into a narrow canyon (the Waimakariri Gorge), before reverting to its braided form for its passage across the plains. It enters the Pacific north of Christchurch, near the town of Kaiapoi.

Instead of being unoccupied Crown land as are most New Zealand river beds, the bed of the Waimakariri River is vested in the Canterbury Regional Council (Environment Canterbury).

== Name ==
The name Waimakariri comes from the Māori words wai, meaning water, and makariri, meaning cold. The river was briefly renamed as the Courtenay River in 1849 by the chief surveyor of the Canterbury Association, Joseph Thomas, in honour of Lord Courtenay. However, this name quickly fell into disuse in favour of the traditional Māori name. The Waimakariri is colloquially referred to as the 'Waimak', a shortening of the Māori name.

== Geography ==
The source of the Waimakariri is located in the Southern Alps, at the head of a valley to the west of Arthur's Pass, where it is primarily fed by snow melt and glacial runoff. The river flows in a southerly direction, before turning east around the base of Mount Stewart. The river at this stage becomes braided, and is joined by the Bealey River as it flows across wide shingle beds.

As the river is joined by the Esk River, the Waimakariri river is forced into a narrow series of gorges and ceases being braided. This continues as the river flows through the foothills of the Southern Alps, and its valley is used by the Midland Line railway as part of its traverse of the Southern Alps. The river exits the foothills at the Waimakariri Gorge, at which point it again expands to a braided system.

Once on the Canterbury Plains, the Waimakariri flows in a roughly east-south-easterly direction towards the Pacific Ocean. As with other braided river systems, the main channels frequently change within the primary riverbed, especially during periods of high flow rates. Geological evidence indicates that this mobility has extended to the river itself in the past, at times flowing through the current location of Christchurch into what is now the Avon Heathcote Estuary, and in a different era flowing into Lake Ellesmere / Te Waihora, to the south of Banks Peninsula. To protect Christchurch and other settlements near the river, multiple flood protections have been constructed either side of the river since European settlement, dating as early as the Canterbury Rivers Act 1868.

The river currently reaches the Pacific Ocean just to the north of Christchurch, entering Pegasus Bay by way of Brooklands Lagoon. The Waimakariri marks one of only a few breaks in the roughly 50 km (31 mi) length of Pegasus Bay. Along with two other rivers which enter Pegasus Bay (Ashley River / Rakahuri and Waipara River), the Waimakariri is almost entirely responsible for the sediment which forms the bay and its coastal plain.

=== Waimakariri River Regional Park ===
Environment Canterbury manages a regional park covering 15,000 hectares (37,000 acres) including the Waimakariri River bed and land on the river margins, to allow for recreation and conservation activities in addition to flood protection. The first stages of the regional park were opened in 2005. The park is divided into sections with different characteristics, and can support a range of activities including walking, picnicking, trail running, mountain biking, fishing, gamebird hunting and horse riding. There are 14 mountain bike trails.

== Ecology ==
As one of the largest rivers on the Canterbury plains, the Waimakariri is an important habitat for wildlife, including many endangered species of plants and animals. The dry sections of riverbed are home to black-fronted terns, where braids in the river provide a natural barrier to predators. The river and its tributaries are home to native species, including crayfish / kōura, New Zealand longfin eel, short-finned eel, lamprey and many species of invertebrates. The river is one of the few remaining habitats for the critically endangered Canterbury mudfish (kowaro), which previously inhabited wetlands across the Canterbury plains, while a portion of its riverbank is home to one of only two known remaining populations of Olearia adenocarpa.

Introduced fish are common along the entirety of the Waimakariri River, making the river a popular location for fishing. As with most of New Zealand, this primarily includes brown and rainbow trout, as well as Chinook salmon (Oncorhynchus tshawytscha). The salmon population dates to the early 1900s, when they were introduced from California, and results in large salmon runs near the river mouth in summer.

== Development ==
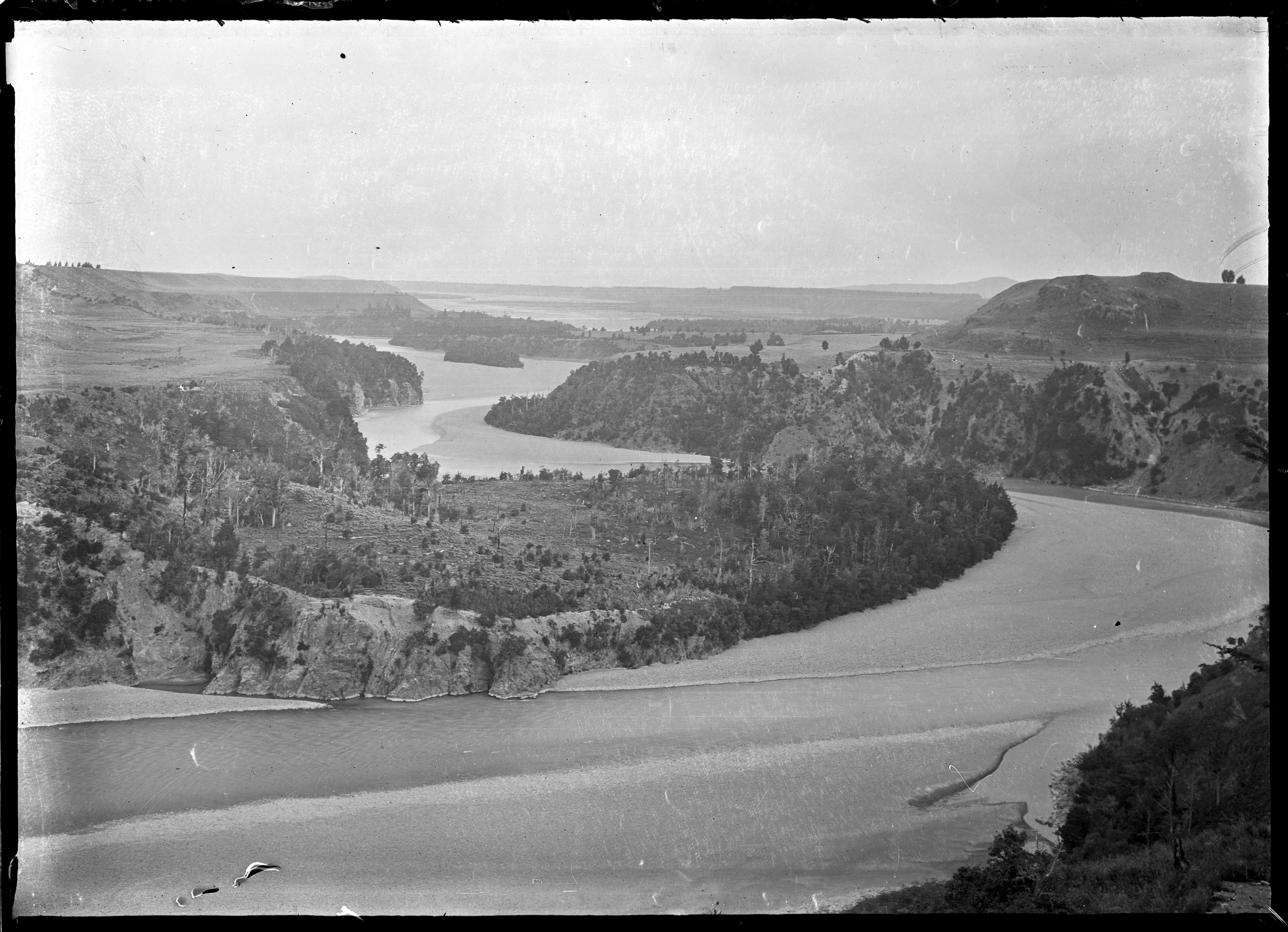
View of river at Kowai Bush near Springfield, 1927

In 1923 the river was mainly investigated for a hydroelectric dam to supply electricity to Christchurch. It received support from the community but the dam was never built since the Government offered inexpensive electricity from the Lake Coleridge scheme.

The Central Plains Water Trust is proposing to take 40 cubic metres per second (1,400 cu ft/s) of water from two points on the Waimakariri River as part of the Central Plains Water enhancement scheme.

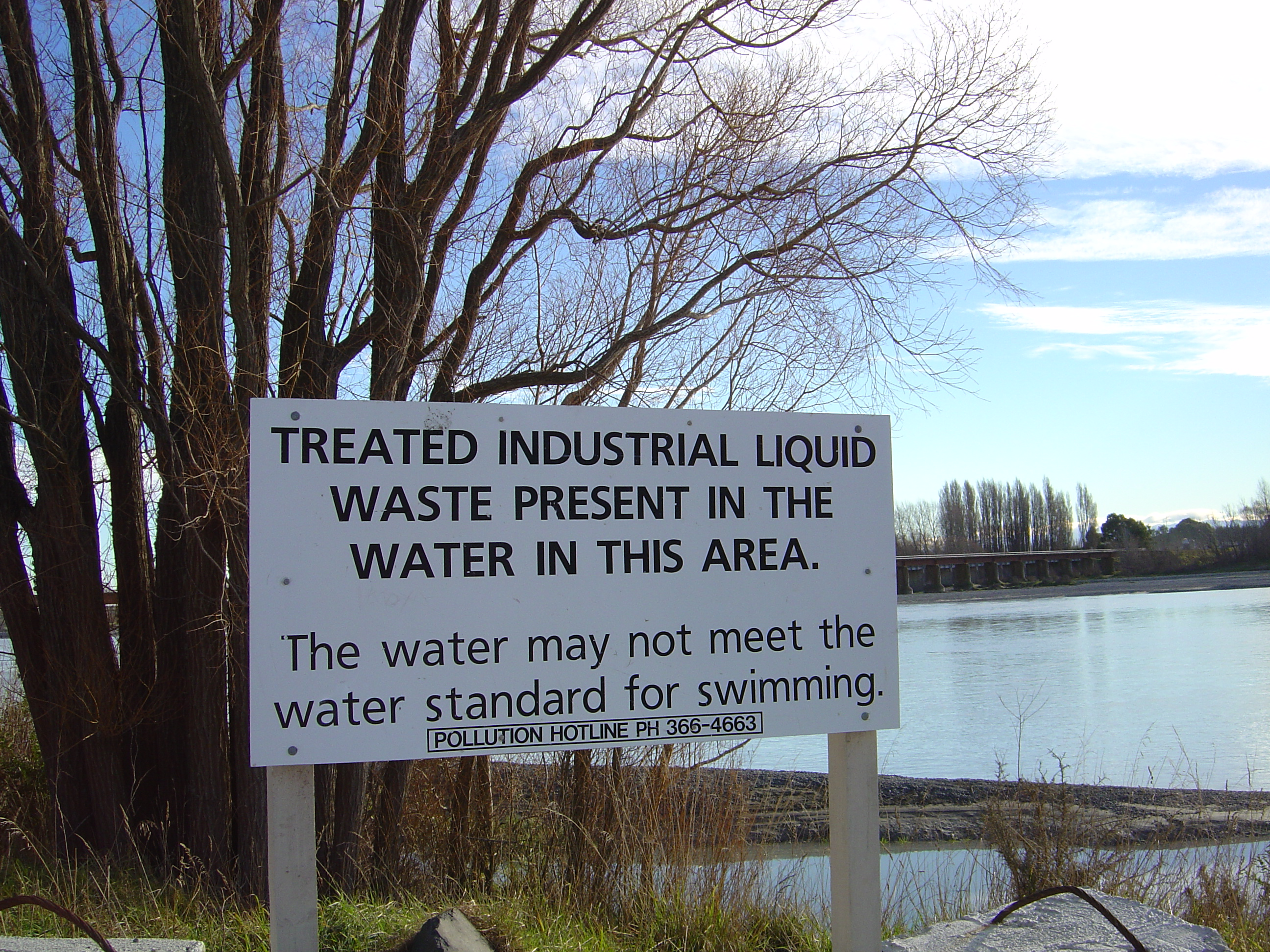
A water pollution sign on the lower reaches of the river

== Pollution ==
In 2007 the Waimakariri was ranked as one of the ten most polluted of the larger rivers in New Zealand. Some of the pollution was caused by liquid wastes from industries such as a meat processing plant and wool scourers in the vicinity of the river. The wastes were discharged directly into it but as of 2012 it was piped to the municipal sewage treatment plant. There had been some non-compliance issues with the resource consents for water discharge.

== Cultural references ==
The Waimakariri River is described in several works by author Ruth France. Her poem "After Flood", published under the pseudonym "Paul Henderson", describes "the alive / Roar of the river loud on the loose", and as being an "age-long wanderer, age-wily". Her novel, Ice Cold River (1961), describes the flooding of a family farm at Christmas after the Waimakariri River bursts through a stopbank:

The water advanced so slowly and quietly that it seemed no more than the tide making in an estuary backwater.... [Q]uite suddenly, the lake of water seemed to lift itself, hurled itself over the garden and against the house in a wave that thumped as did a blasting operation at a distance. Immediately the house was surrounded, and the wave went on, eating up the fields with rapid teeth of dirty foam, in which sticks and grass and debris turned over, were engulfed, and reappeared in an endless sucking whirlpool.

== Bridges ==
From upstream to downstream, the current bridges are:

Name	Coord	Type	Notes
Waimakariri Falls	42.91821°S 171.48729°E	Suspension foot bridge	Adjacent Waimakariri Falls Hut
Bealey Bridge	43.01981°S 171.5964°E	Single lane road bridge	On State Highway 73
Midland Railway Bridge 42	43.01153°S 171.7148°E	KiwiRail bridge #42	On Midland Line
Mount White Bridge	43.00573°S 171.74686°E	Single lane road bridge	
Waimakariri Gorge Bridge	43.35987°S 172.05027°E	Road bridge	Category II historic place
SH1 Waimakariri Bridges	43.41519°S 172.64672°E	Twin three-lane road bridges	On State Highway 1
Main North Road bridge	43.41310°S 172.65137°E	Two lane road bridge	
Main North Line bridge 17	43.41293°S 172.65151°E	Rail bridge	On Main North Line

Bridges across Waimakariri River

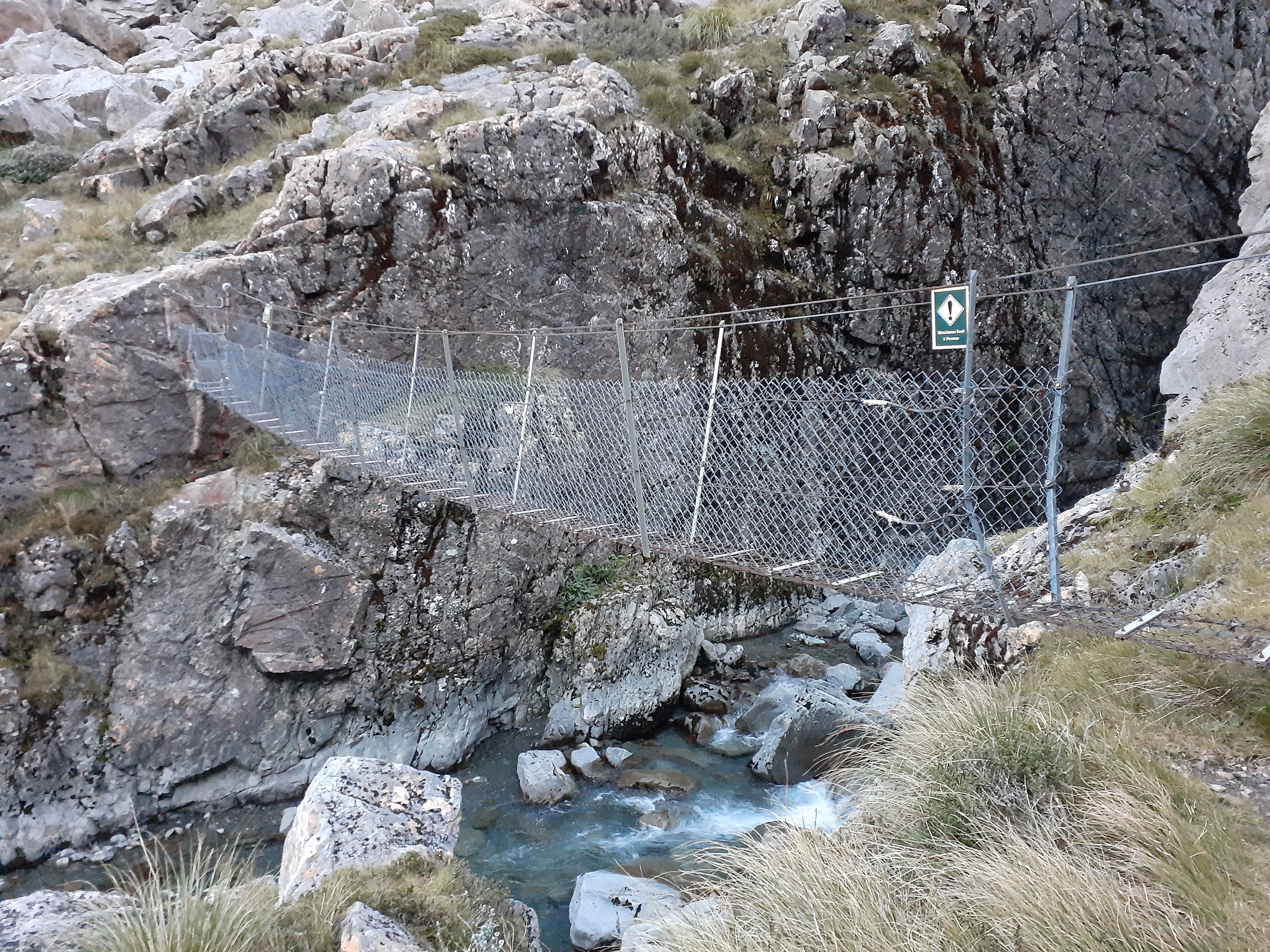
Waimakariri Falls Bridge

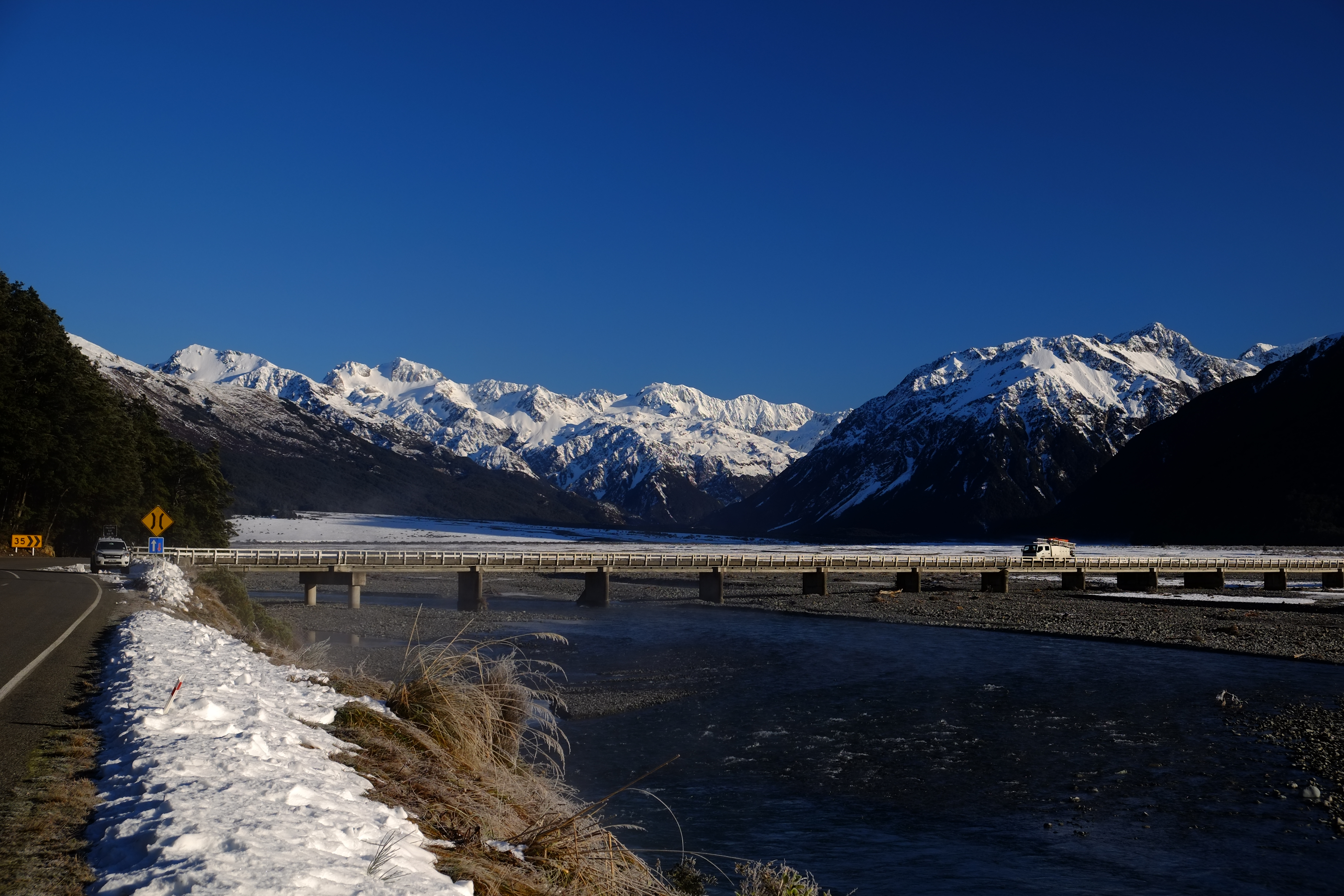
Bealey Bridge

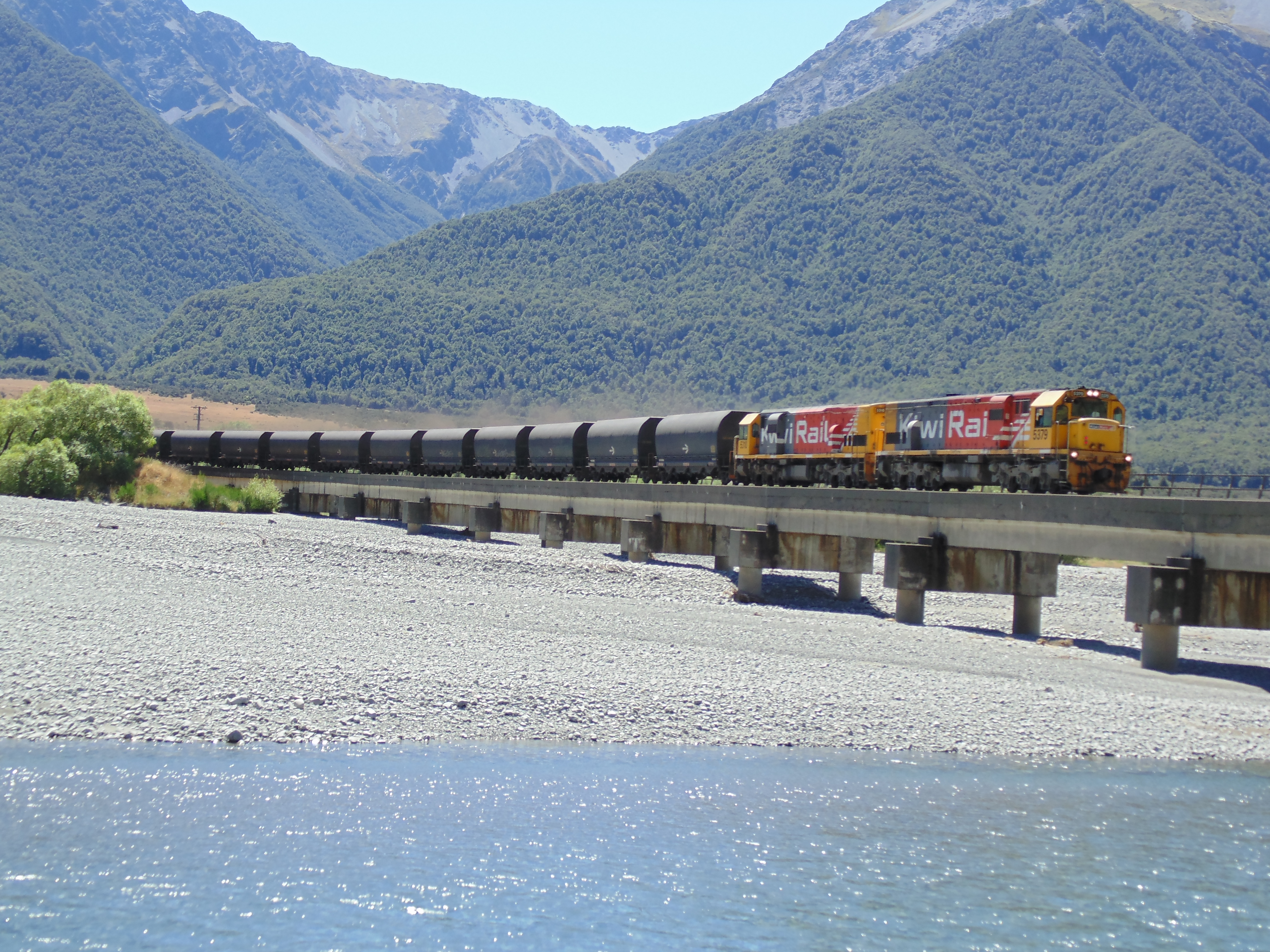
Midland Line bridge

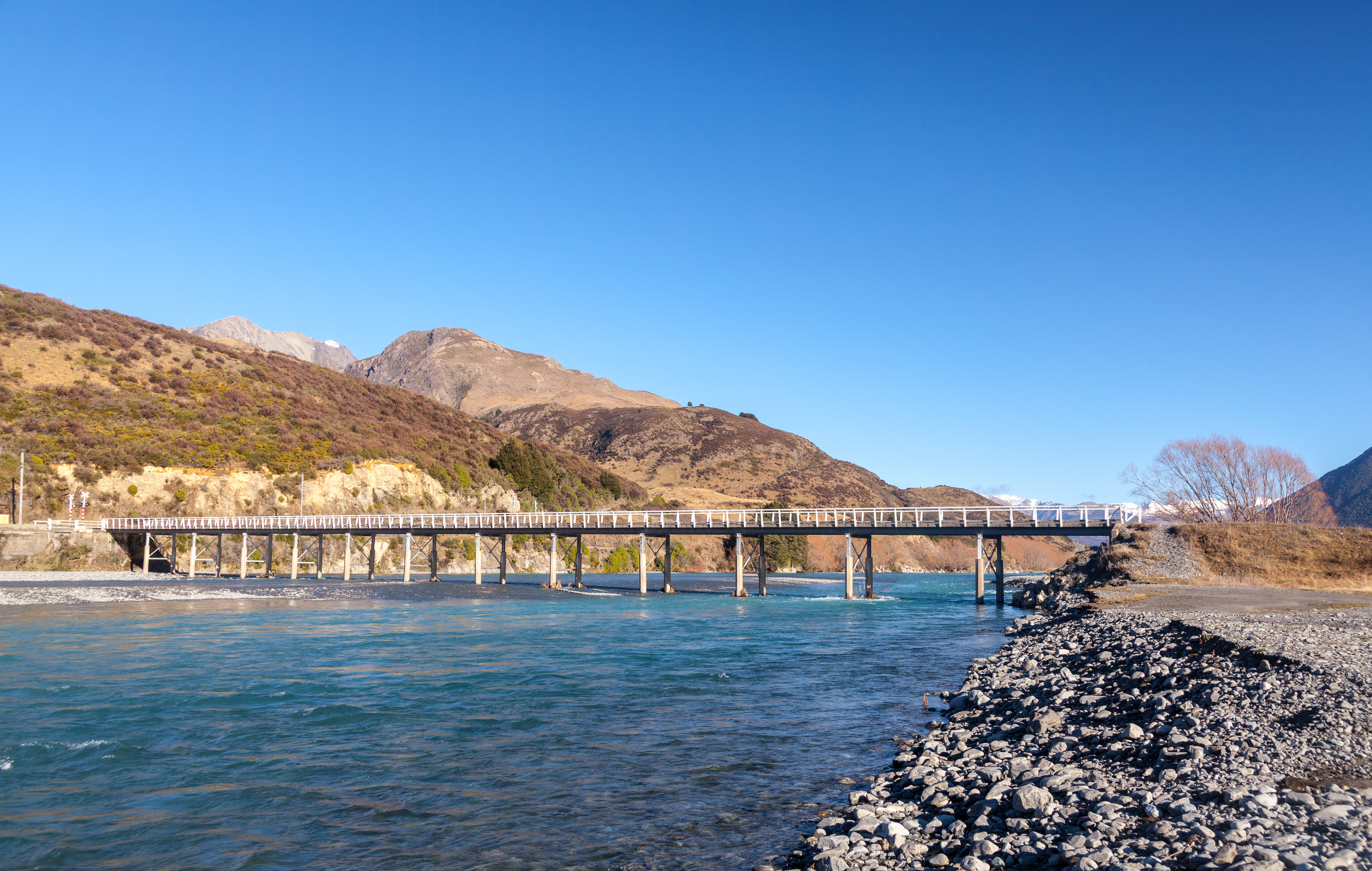
Mount White Bridge

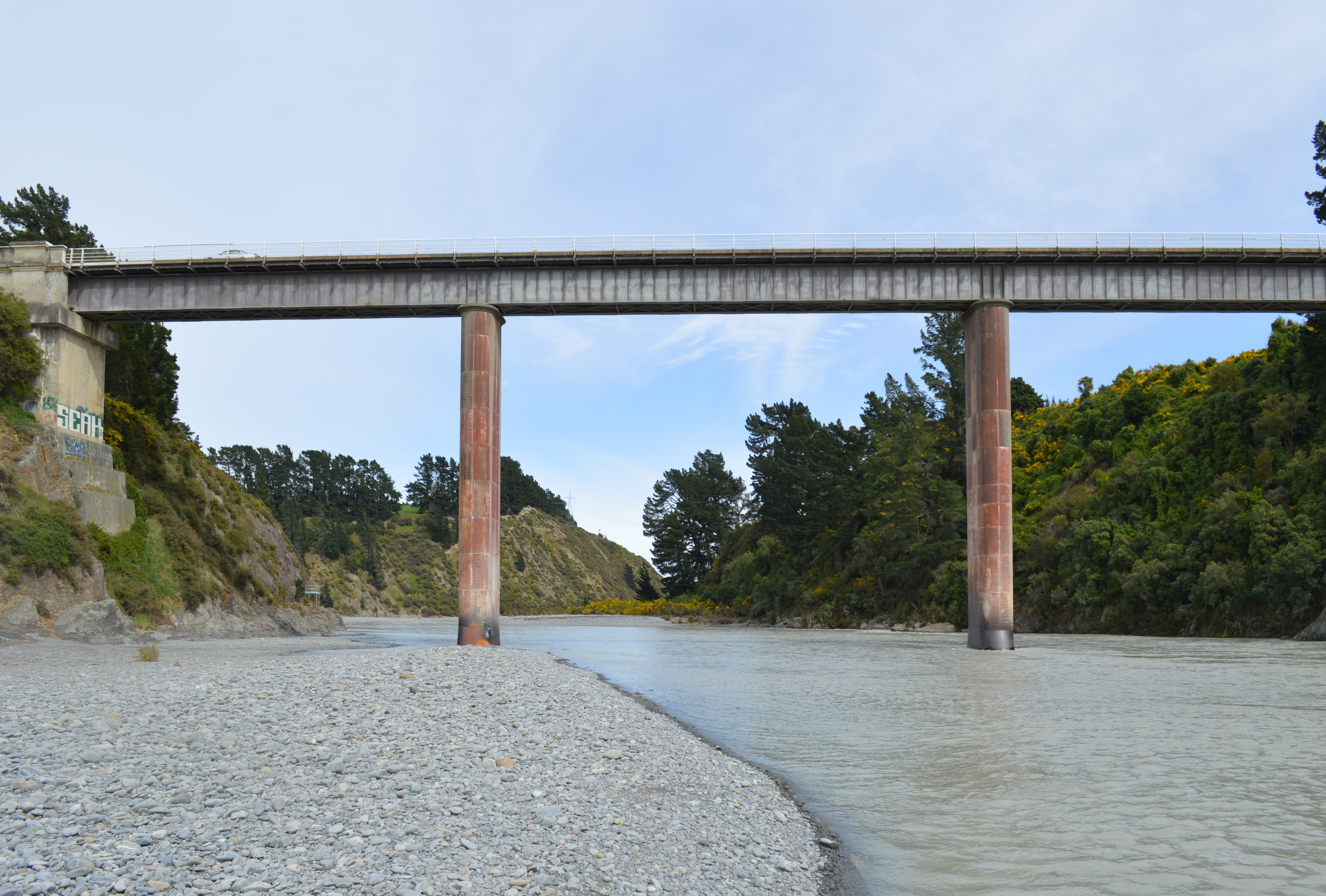
Waimakariri Gorge Bridge

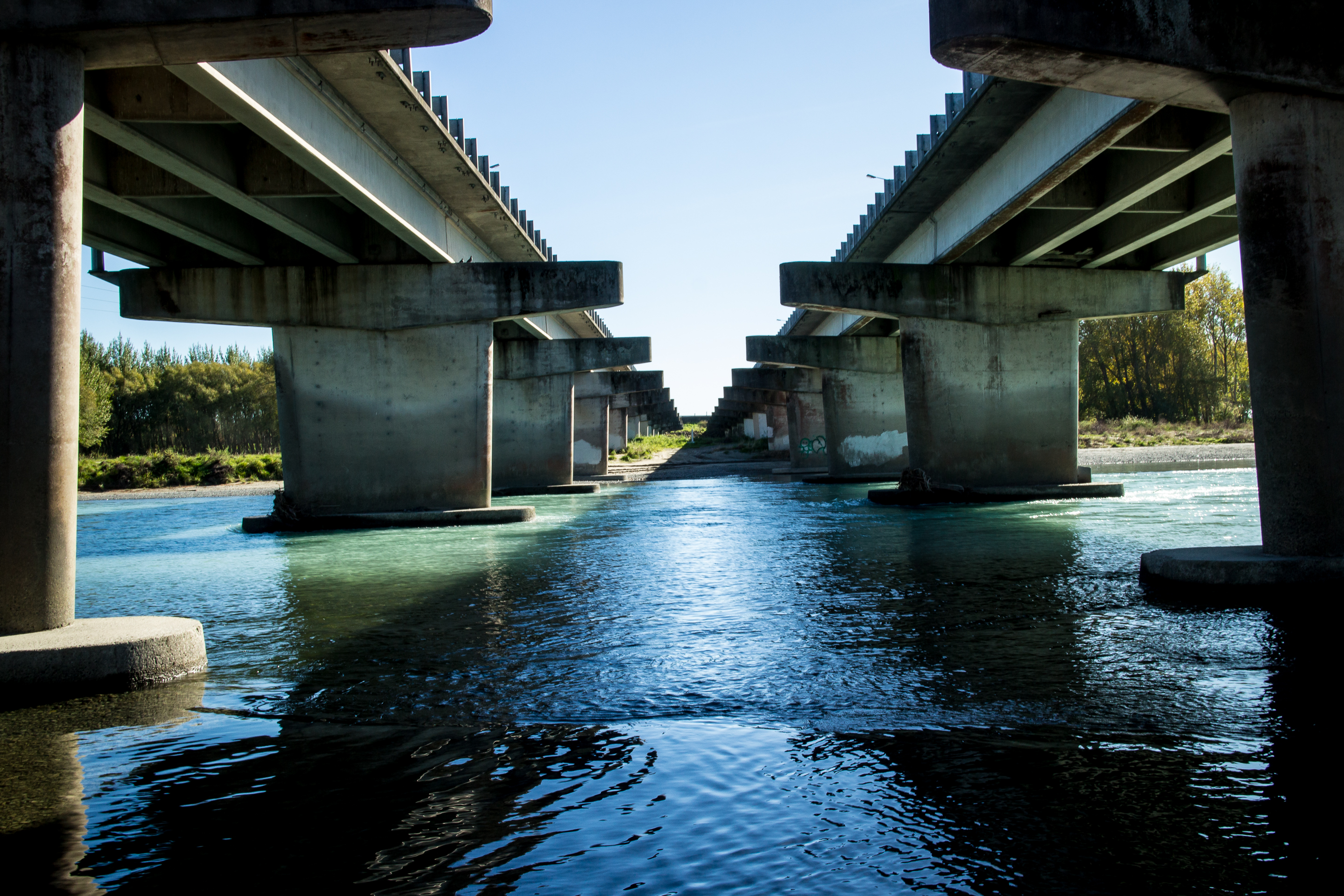
SH1 bridges (looking north)

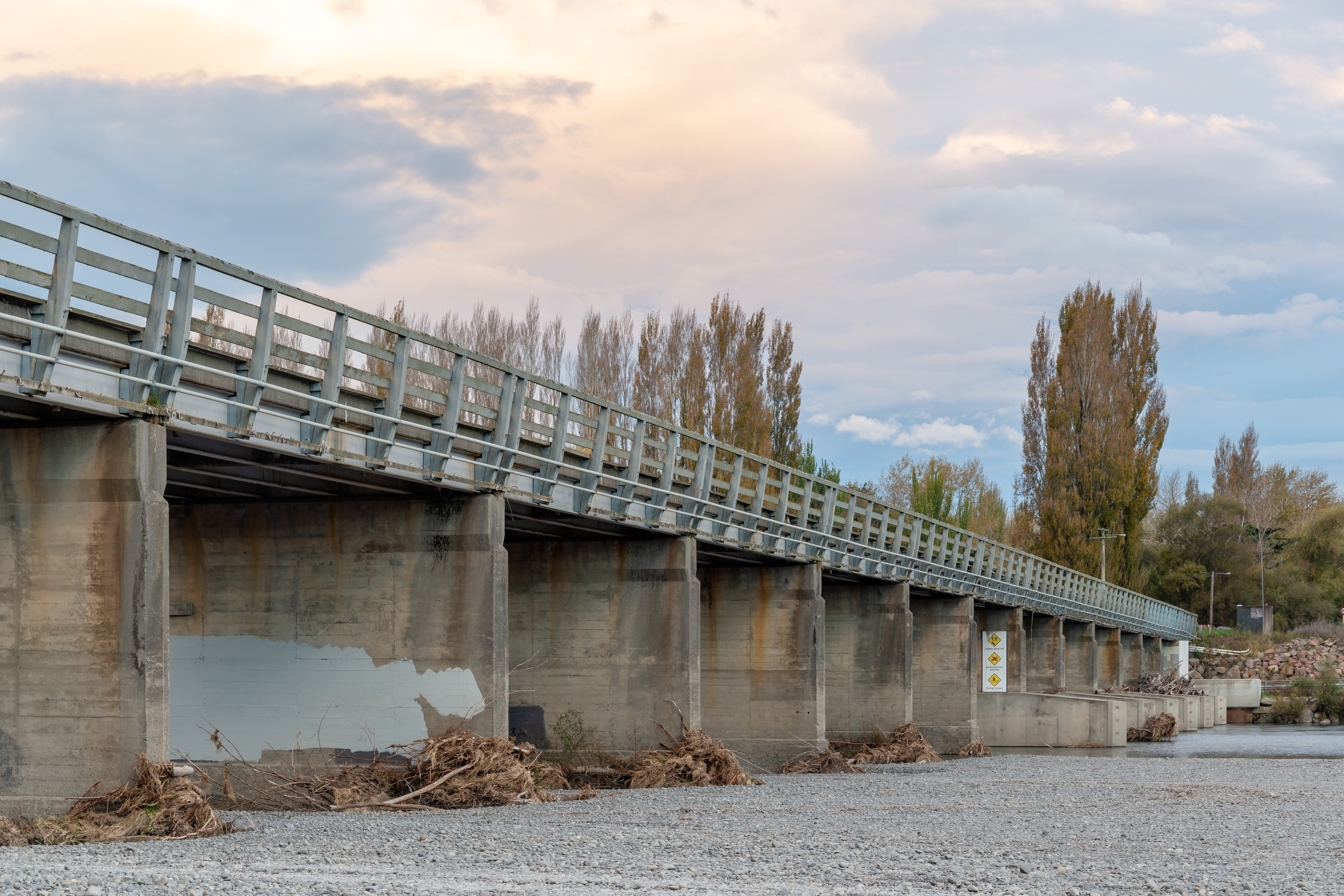
Main North Road bridge

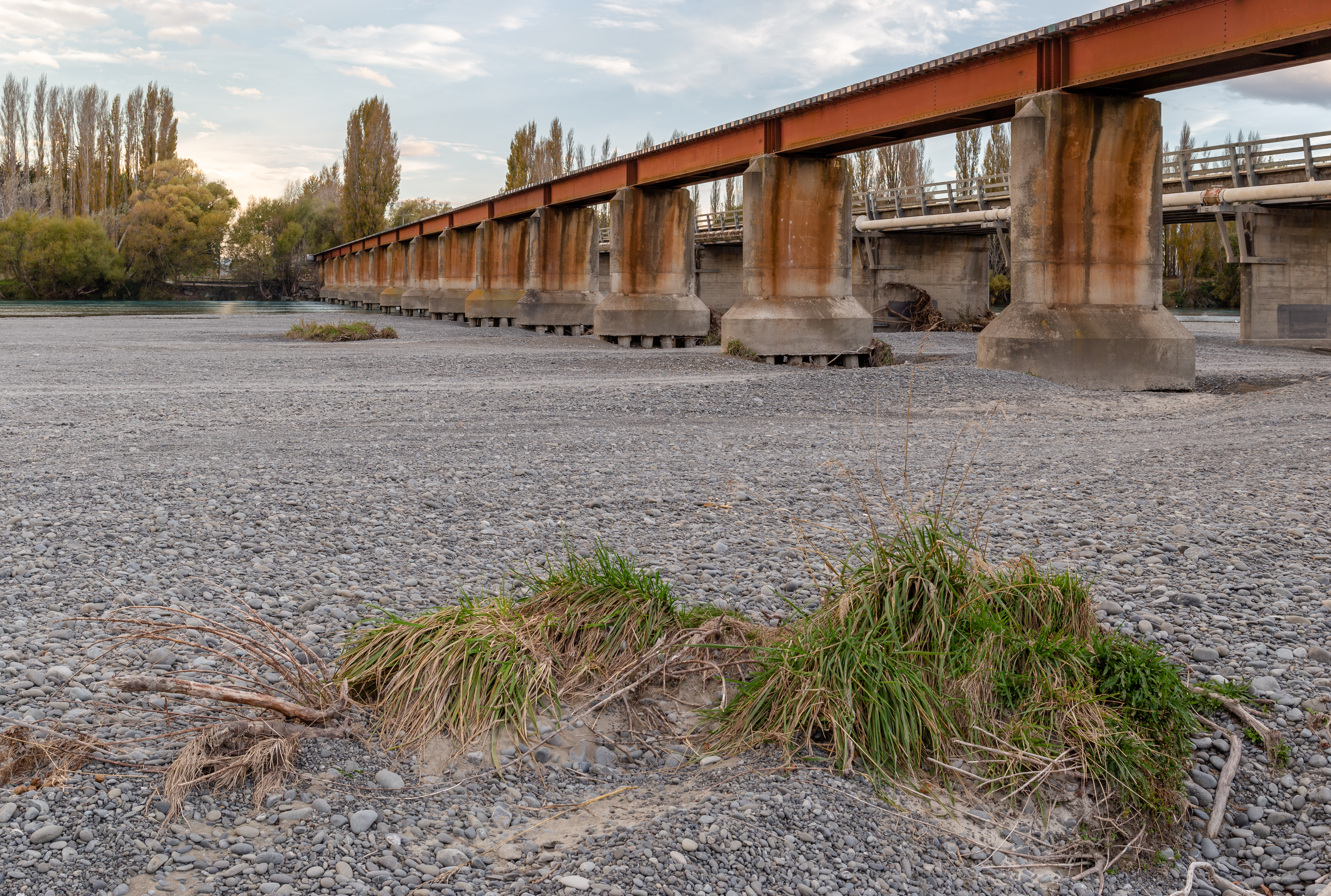
Main North Line bridge
