= State Highway 77 (New Zealand) =

Road in New Zealand

State Highway 77
- Route of Inland Scenic Route

Route information
- Maintained by NZ Transport Agency Waka Kotahi
- Length: 93.9 km (58.3 mi)
- Tourist routes: Inland Scenic Route between Homebush and Mount Hutt

Major junctions
- Northwest end: SH 73 (South Terrace/West Coast Road) at Darfield
- Southeast end: SH 1 (West Street) at Ashburton

Location
- Country: New Zealand
- Primary destinations: Coalgate, Glentunnel, Rakaia Gorge, Methven

Highway system
- New Zealand state highways; Motorways and expressways; List
← SH 76	→ SH 78

State Highway 77 is a state highway in New Zealand going through the inland parts of Central and Mid Canterbury between the towns of Ashburton and Darfield via the Rakaia Gorge. It is wholly single carriageway with two one-lane bridges at the Rakaia and Selwyn Rivers. One set of traffic lights is found in Ashburton marking the southern terminus of the highway.

About 43 km of the highway lie on the Inland Scenic Route (formerly State Highway 72).

== Route ==
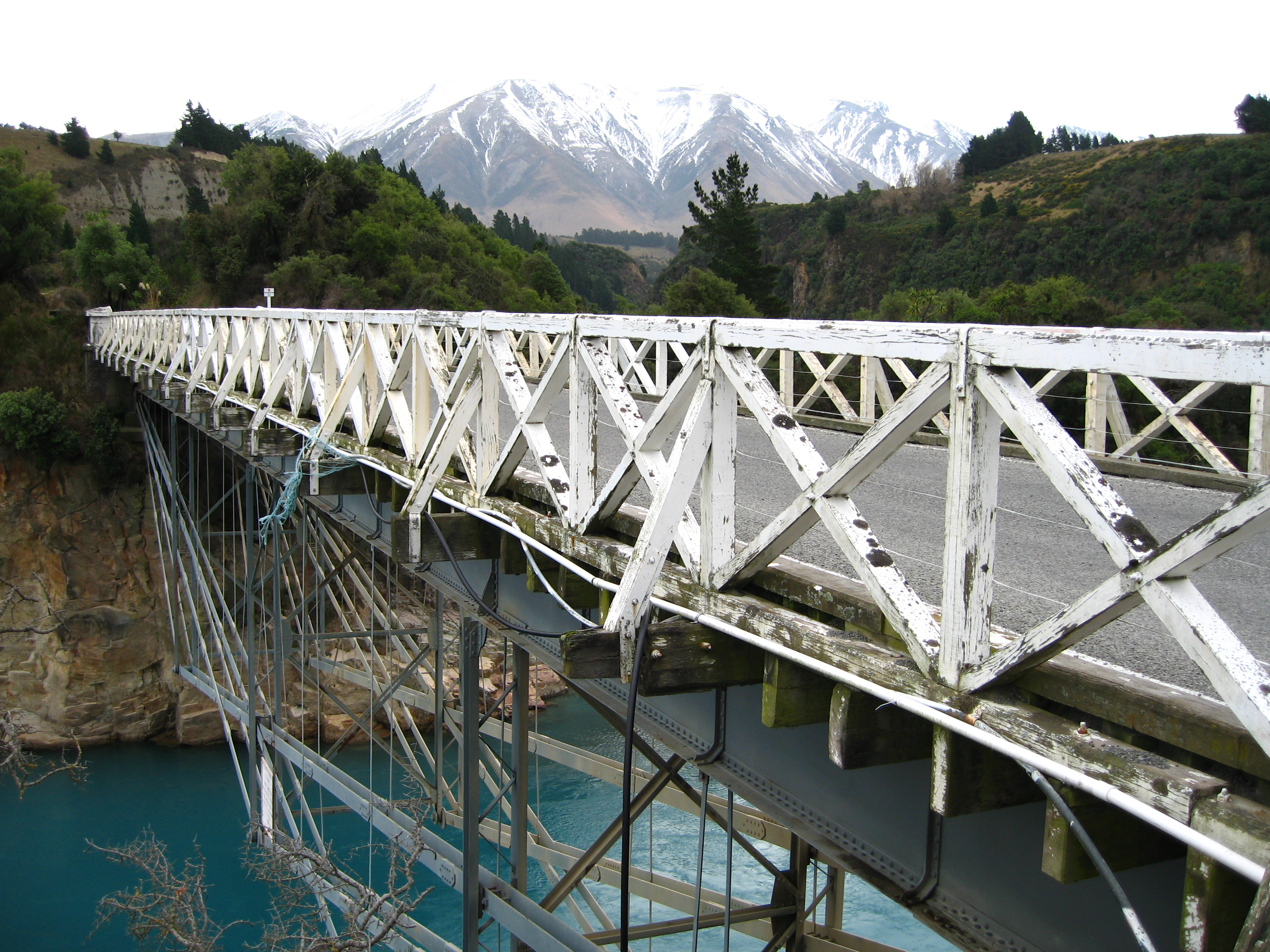
State Highway 77 passing over the Rakaia Gorge Bridge, which was built in 1882

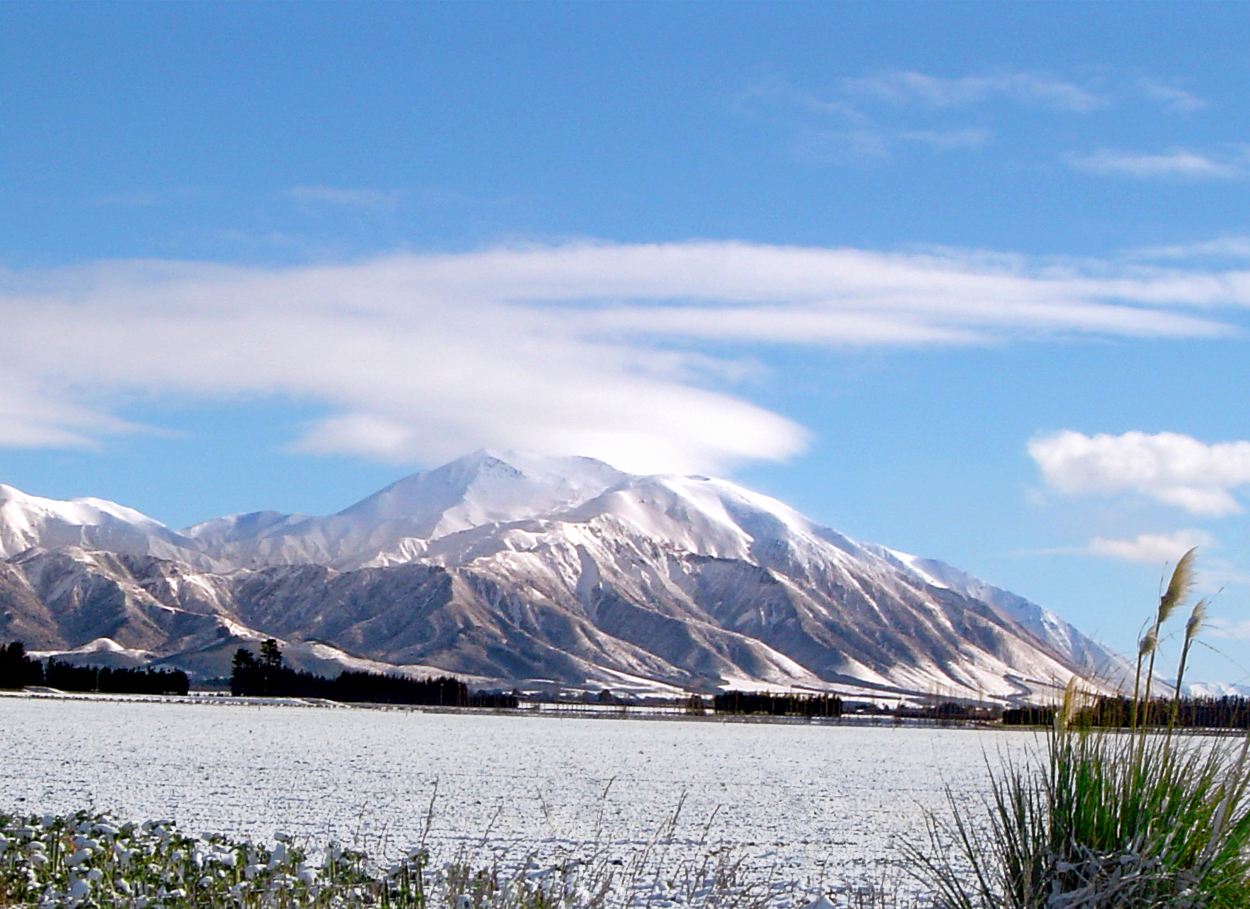
Much of State Highway 77 is dominated by the skyline of the Southern Alps and Canterbury foothills. Mount Hutt is especially noticeable from SH 77

The highway begins as Bangor Road just west of Darfield town centre, and proceeds in a westerly directions towards the mountains through flat pastoral farmland. Just before reaching the foothills, the road intersects with the Inland Scenic Route (Deans Road) coming from Waddington and begins its concurrency at Homebush. After a name change to Homebush Road, the road skirts to the north of Coalgate and then to the south of Glentunnel before veering left and narrowing to one lane to cross the Selwyn River.

Now known as Wairiri Road, the road widens back to two lanes and passes through undulating to hilly farmland. At Glenroy the road changes name to Windwhistle Road and climbs towards the settlement of Windwhistle.

Beyond Windwhistle, the name changes to Rakaia Gorge Road and begins a spectacular descent into the Rakaia Gorge. For most of its length the Rakaia River runs on shingle river beds as a braided river but here the river is mostly a single channel. The river here has carved out the surrounding land to form two level terraces. The road passes over both these terraces before narrowing to one lane again to cross the river.

After widening again, the road changes name to Arundel Rakaia Gorge Road and rises towards the plains again. The road emerges onto the plains but passes right underneath the towering Mount Hutt. The road is frequently covered by snow and ices over in sheltered areas during the calmer periods of the winter months in higher parts of the road.

The road turns left onto Waimarama Road 10 km north of Alford Forest and proceeds through arable farmland, changes name again to Mount Hutt Station Road and arrives in Methven, where it changes name again to Main Street.

After Methven, the road changes name to Methven Highway and proceeds in a south to southeasterly direction through more pastoral farmland. Before Ashburton, the road hugs the Ashburton River / Hakatere, the name of the road changes to Alford Forest Road for about 2 km, then to River Terrace for 600 m and lastly to Moore Street for the last 300 m of the route before terminating at SH 1 in the town centre.

== Route changes ==
When SH 72 had its state highway status revoked, SH 77 was extended to cover the section between (its former terminus) Mount Hutt and Waddington. In 1997, SH 77 was diverted at the intersection of Homebush Road, along Bangor Road, to terminate with SH 73 at Darfield.

== Major intersections ==
Territorial authority	Location	km	jct	Destinations	Notes
Ashburton District	Ashburton Central	0.0		SH 1 north (West Street) – Rakaia, Christchurch (Moore Street) – Town Centre; SH 1 south (West Street) – Temuka, Timaru	SH 77 begins
Ashburton District		6.0		(Ashburton Staveley Road) – Mount Somers, Alford Forest, Staveley	
Ashburton District		22.3		(Thompsons Track) – Mount Somers, Mayfield, Rakaia, Christchurch	
Ashburton District	Methven	33.9		(Forest Drive) – Mount Somers, Geraldine (Methven Chertsey Road) – Lauriston	
Ashburton District		36.6		(Mount Hutt Station Road) – Rakaia Gorge (alternative route)	
Ashburton District		43.6		Inland Scenic Route (Arundel Rakaia Gorge Road) – Geraldine, Timaru (McLennans Bush Road) – Mount Hutt Ski Area	SH 77/Inland Scenic Route (Regional Route 72) concurrency begins
Ashburton District	Mount Hutt	49.0		(Mount Hutt Station Road) – Methven (alternative route)	
Ashburton District	Rakaia Gorge	53.0		Rakaia River Bridge #1	
Selwyn District	Rakaia Gorge	53.0		Rakaia River Bridge #1	
Selwyn District	Windwhistle	59.4		(Coleridge Road) – Lake Coleridge (Leaches Road) – Hororata	
Selwyn District	Glenroy	70.0		(Downs Road) – Hororata	
Selwyn District	Glentunnel	79.0		Selwyn River Bridge	
Selwyn District	Glentunnel	79.2		(Whitecliffs Road) – Whitecliffs	
Selwyn District	Coalgate	82.8		(Malvern Hills Road) (Bridge Street) – Coalgate, Hororata	
Selwyn District	Coalgate	86.0		Inland Scenic Route (Deans Road) – Oxford, Springfield, West Coast via Arthur's Pass	SH 77/Inland Scenic Route (Regional Route 72) concurrency ends
Selwyn District	Darfield	94.0		SH 73 west (South Terrace) – Springfield, West Coast via Arthur's Pass; SH 73 east (South Terrace) – Christchurch	SH 77 ends

== See also ==
- List of New Zealand state highways
