= Coalgate, New Zealand =

Settlement in Canterbury, New Zealand

Coalgate
- Village
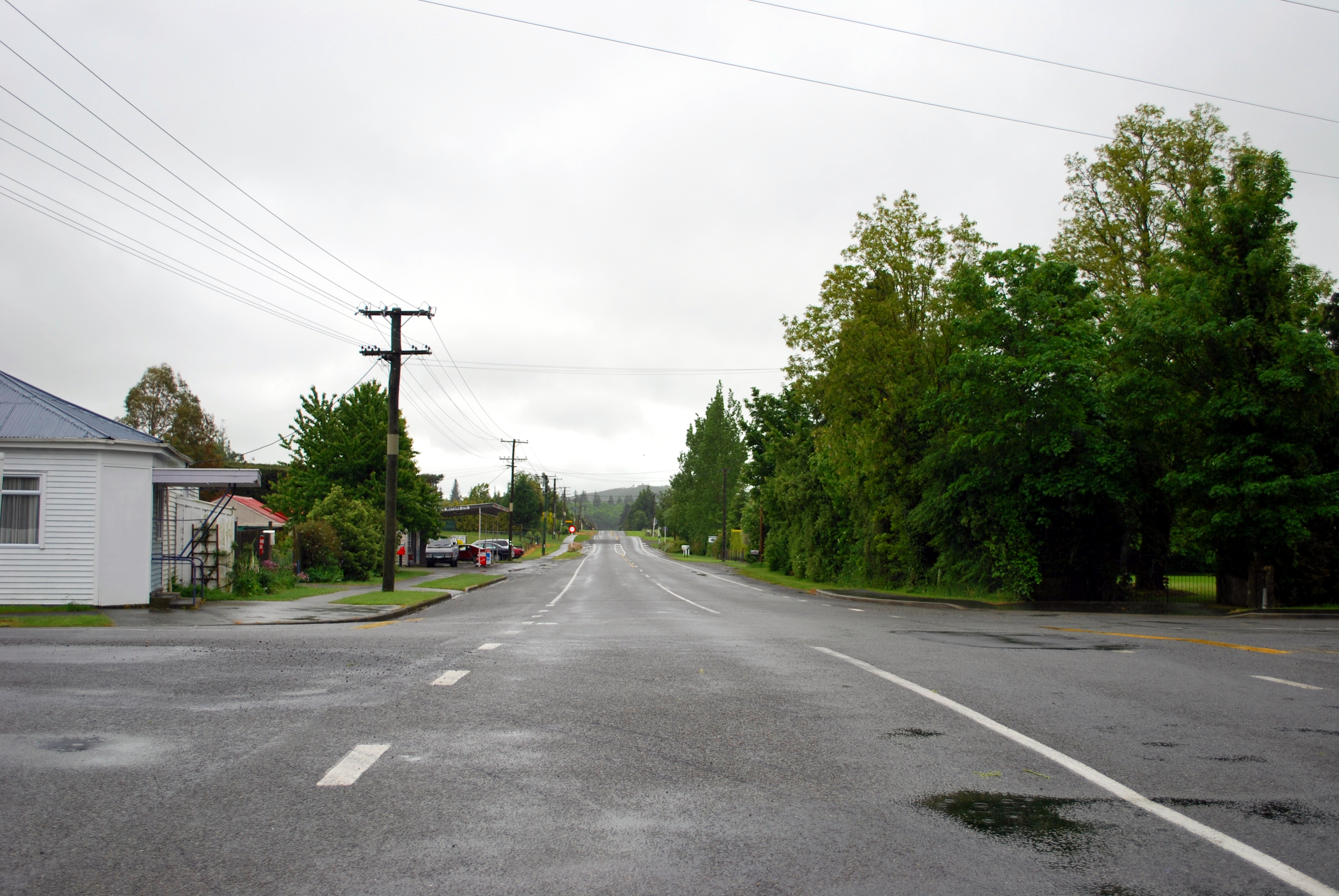
- Bridge Street, November 2011
- Interactive map of Coalgate
- Coordinates: 43°29′S 171°58′E
- Country: New Zealand
- Region: Canterbury
- Territorial authority: Selwyn District
- Ward: Malvern
- Community: Malvern
- Electorates: Selwyn; Te Tai Tonga (Māori)

Government
  - Territorial authority: Selwyn District Council
  - Regional council: Environment Canterbury
  - Mayor of Selwyn: Lydia Gliddon
  - Selwyn MP: Nicola Grigg
  - Te Tai Tonga MP: Tākuta Ferris

Area
  - Total: 1.09 km^{2} (0.42 sq mi)

Population (June 2025)
  - Total: 390
  - Density: 360/km^{2} (930/sq mi)
- Time zone: UTC+12 (New Zealand Standard Time)
  - Summer (DST): UTC+13 (New Zealand Daylight Time)
- Area code: 03

Coalgate is a small town in the Selwyn District of the Canterbury region of New Zealand's South Island. It is located roughly an hour west of Christchurch on State Highway 77. The town's name stems from it being the "gateway" to the lignite coal fields around Whitecliffs, the Rakaia Gorge, and the Acheron River. Coal mining declined in the 20th century and has now ceased, but since the 1950s, commercial processing of nontronite has taken place in Coalgate.

== Demographics ==
Coalgate is described by Stats NZ as a rural settlement, and covers 1.09 km^{2} (0.42 sq mi). It had an estimated population of 390 as of June 2025, with a population density of 358 people per km^{2}. It is part of the Glentunnel statistical area.

Historical population
Year	Pop.	±% p.a.
2006	228	—
2013	321	+5.01%
2018	342	+1.28%
2023	375	+1.86%
The 2006 population is for a smaller area of 0.75 km^{2}. Source:

Coalgate had a population of 375 in the 2023 New Zealand census, an increase of 33 people (9.6%) since the 2018 census, and an increase of 54 people (16.8%) since the 2013 census. There were 183 males and 192 females in 159 dwellings. 2.4% of people identified as LGBTIQ+. The median age was 42.3 years (compared with 38.1 years nationally). There were 81 people (21.6%) aged under 15 years, 30 (8.0%) aged 15 to 29, 192 (51.2%) aged 30 to 64, and 72 (19.2%) aged 65 or older.

People could identify as more than one ethnicity. The results were 96.8% European (Pākehā), 10.4% Māori, 1.6% Asian, and 2.4% other, which includes people giving their ethnicity as "New Zealander". English was spoken by 98.4%, Māori by 1.6%, and other languages by 6.4%. No language could be spoken by 0.8% (e.g. too young to talk). The percentage of people born overseas was 17.6, compared with 28.8% nationally.

Religious affiliations were 19.2% Christian, 1.6% Hindu, 0.8% Māori religious beliefs, and 0.8% other religions. People who answered that they had no religion were 69.6%, and 10.4% of people did not answer the census question.

Of those at least 15 years old, 45 (15.3%) people had a bachelor's or higher degree, 168 (57.1%) had a post-high school certificate or diploma, and 84 (28.6%) people exclusively held high school qualifications. The median income was $44,100, compared with $41,500 nationally. 18 people (6.1%) earned over $100,000 compared to 12.1% nationally. The employment status of those at least 15 was 153 (52.0%) full-time, 48 (16.3%) part-time, and 3 (1.0%) unemployed.

== Services ==
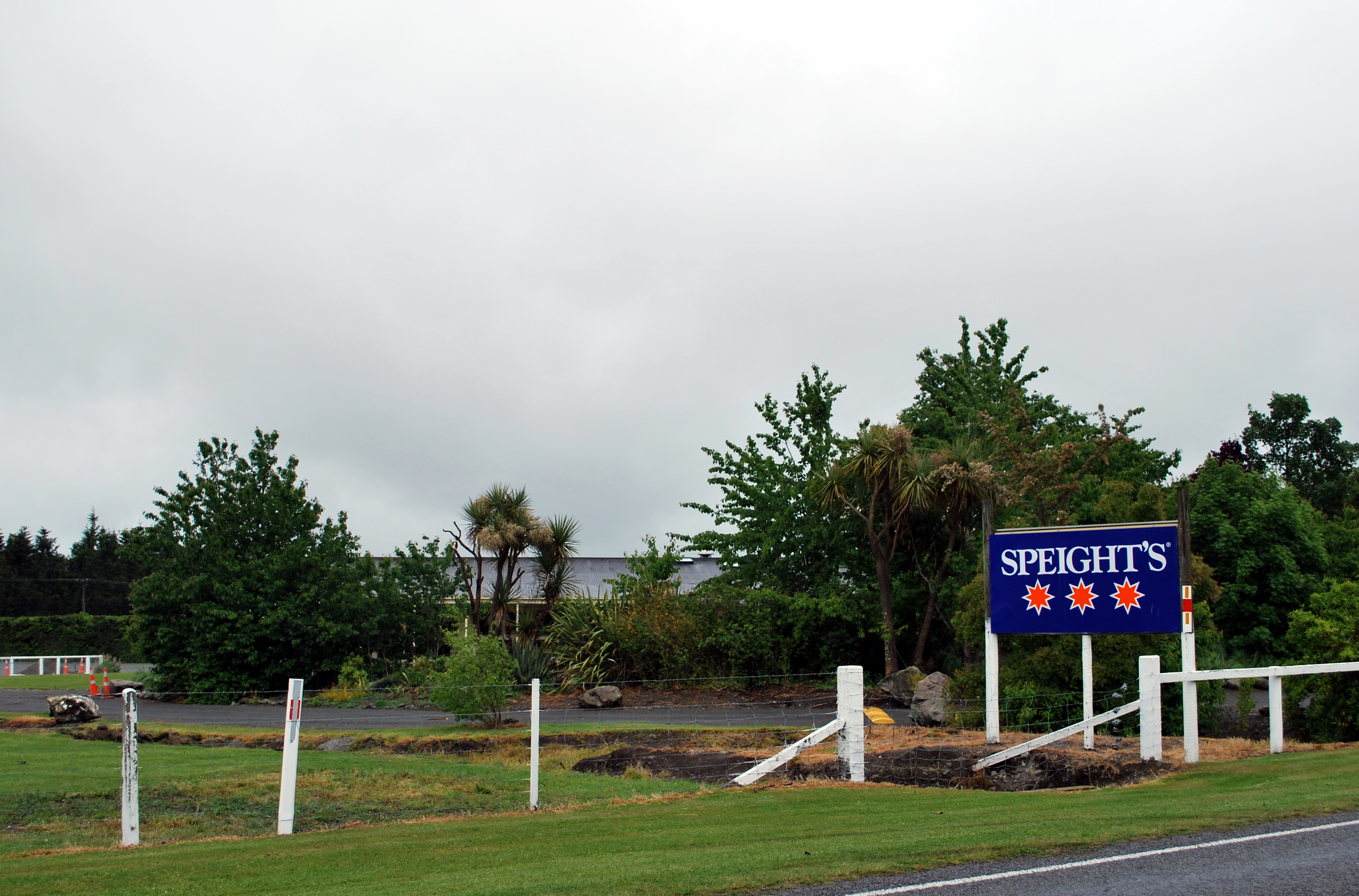
Coalgate Tavern, November 2011

Notable features are the Coalgate Tavern and the Coalgate Cabins, both situated on the main road to Hororata. Coalgate also has a walkway through the old Coalgate Domain. In addition to these there is also a Coalgate bowling green. A garage is also located in Coalgate.

The town has access to the Selwyn River and is situated to the east of Glentunnel.

== Transport ==
On 3 November 1875, the Whitecliffs Branch railway was opened, with a station in Coalgate. It was here that a private line diverged from the state-operated New Zealand Railways Department network. On 31 March 1962, the railway closed, but some of the line's old formation and the station platform can still be found.

Coalgate is serviced by State Highway 77/Inland Scenic Route 72.
