= List of sports clubs and other organisations in Methven, New Zealand =

A variety of sporting and other clubs and organisations developed in Methven, New Zealand with the growth of farming in the area and the increasing population. These include:

== Sports clubs ==
Year established	Name	Notes
1895	Methven Cricket Club	
1896	Methven Rugby Football Club	
1896	Methven Lawn Tennis Association	
1906	Methven Trotting Club	
1918	Methven Outdoor Bowling Club	
1920	Methven Ladies Hockey Club	
1921	Methven Croquet Club	
1924	Methven Golf Club	
1927	Methven Gun Club	
1927	Methven Miniature Rifle Club	
1934	Methven Amateur Swimming Club	
1936	Methven Netball Club	

== Other organisations ==
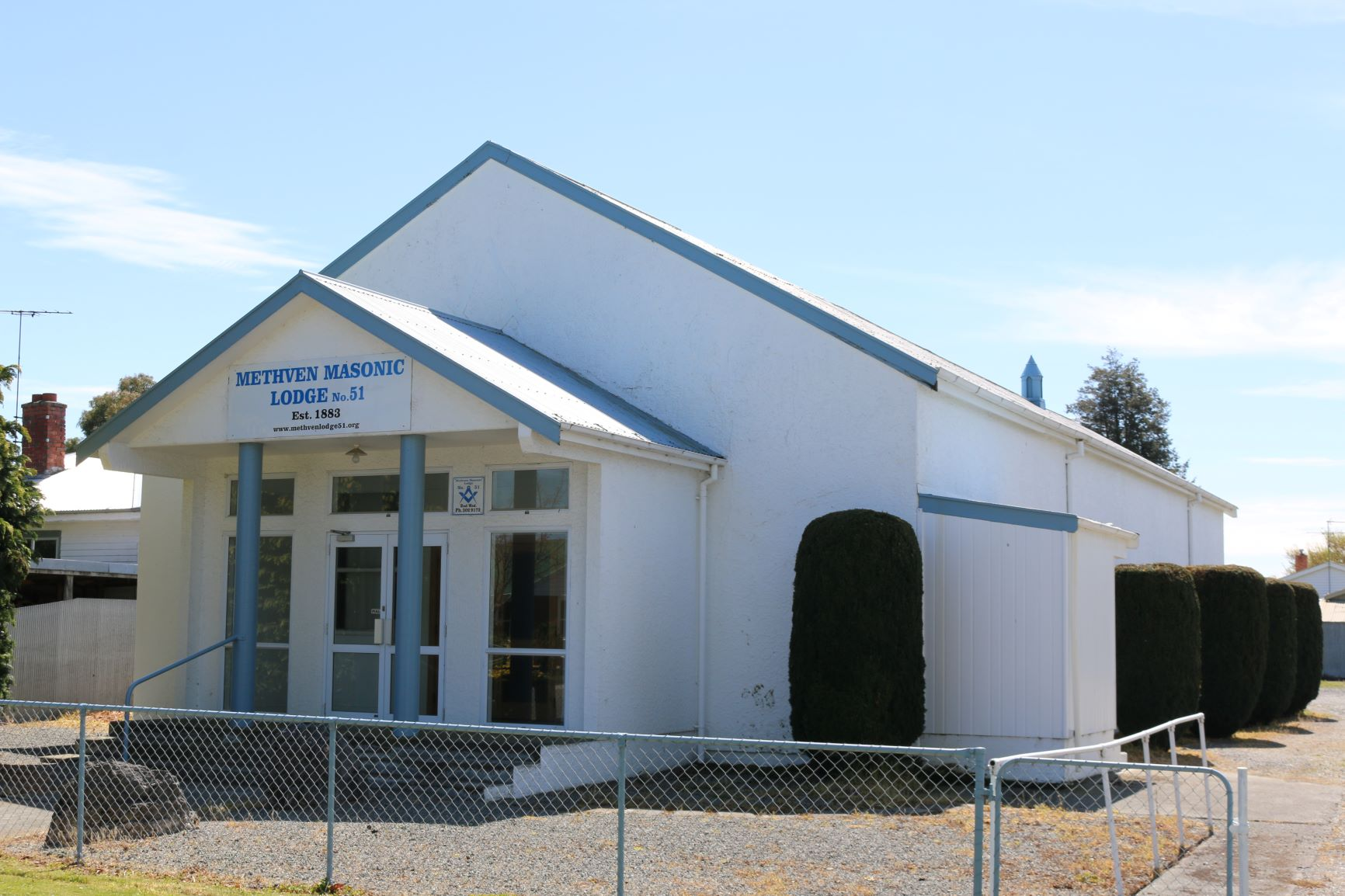
The Methven Masonic Lodge. established 1883. (October 2020)

Year established	Name	Notes
1883	The Methven Lodge	
1900	The Loyal Methven Lodge	
1911	Methven Agricultural and Pastoral Association	
1911	Methven Collie Club	
1922	Methven Plunket Society	
1928	Methven Volunteer Fire Brigade	
1931	Methven Country Women's Institute	
1935	Methven Young Farmers Club	
1936	Methven Women's Division Federated Farmers	
1941	Methven Choral Society	
1945	Methven Federated Farmers	
