= Glenroy, New Zealand =

Glenroy
- Settlement
- Interactive map of Glenroy
- Coordinates: 43.521110°S 171.834084°E
- Country: New Zealand
- Region: Canterbury
- Territorial authority: Selwyn District
- Ward: Malvern
- Electorates: Selwyn; Te Tai Tonga
- Elevation: 309 m (1,014 ft)
- Time zone: UTC+12 (New Zealand Standard Time)
  - Summer (DST): UTC+13 (New Zealand Daylight Time)
- Postcode: 7572; 7673
- Area code: 03

Glenroy is a rural locality in the Selwyn District of the Canterbury region of New Zealand's South Island. It is located on State Highway 77, and is 10 kilometres (6.2 mi) west from Hororata, 8.7 kilometres (5.4 mi) southeast of Glentunnel, and 9.7 kilometres (6.0 mi) west of Windwhistle.

It was named by early settler Ewen McIntosh after Glen Roy in Scotland.
