= Acheron River (Canterbury) =

River in the Selwyn District, New Zealand

- Route of the Acheron River
- Mouth of the Acheron River Acheron River (Canterbury) (South Island)
- Native name: Kairaumati (Māori)

Location
- Country: New Zealand
- region: Canterbury Region
- District: Selwyn District

Physical characteristics
- Source: Lake Lyndon
  - coordinates: 43°18′48″S 171°41′23″E
  - elevation: 830 m (2,720 ft)
- Mouth: Rakaia River
  - coordinates: 43°23′58″S 171°34′20″E
  - elevation: 330 m (1,080 ft)
- Length: 19.8 kilometres (12.3 mi)

Basin features
- Progression: Lake Lyndon → Acheron River → Rakaia River
- River system: Rakaia River

The Acheron River is a river in Canterbury, New Zealand, that flows from Lake Lyndon south into the Rakaia River.

Small deposits of coal are found near the river. In the 1870s, a proposal existed to extend the Whitecliffs Branch, a branch line railway, through the Rakaia Gorge to the Acheron River to access these coal deposits. An 1880 Royal Commission on New Zealand's railway network was in favour of this extension, but it never came to fruition.

== See also ==
- List of rivers of New Zealand
- Acheron River (Marlborough)
- Acheron (river in Greece)
