= Rajah (dog) =

Rajah (c. 1928–1942) was a working and performance German Shepherd dog in New Zealand during the 1930s. Billed as "Methven's Wonder Dog", he was the first, although unofficial, police dog in New Zealand and was nominated as a replacement for Rin Tin Tin during his time in Methven. Rajah amassed fame throughout the country for his acting performances and locating work performed with the New Zealand Police, in multiple locations throughout New Zealand's South Island.

== History ==
Rajah was owned by Constable John Robertson, who was the only serving police officer in the town of Methven at the time. Rajah assisted Robertson in his duties unofficially and while he was not officially designated the position, Rajah was technically the first police dog in New Zealand.

Rajah was trained by Robertson and his son, Ian "Robbie", using a search-and-find method. This made the dog very perceptive at finding concealed objects and assisted the dog greatly in its future work.

== Working life ==
Rajah's work mostly consisted of finding weapons and other notable items, and he was also infrequently used to locate remains. During his time in service, Rajah only failed once in finding his objective – the body of a woman believed by police to have been the victim of foul play and dumped along the railway line that was still under construction at the time. However, it was revealed a few years later that the body he was looking for had been embedded inside a concrete pillar.

When Rin Tin Tin died in 1932, a representative from the now defunct Fox Film Corporation proposed that Rajah be used as his replacement. The family ultimately declined the offer, citing that it was too big a move and instead chose to put Rajah to work doing performances around New Zealand, including in Christchurch and Timaru. Rajah was also able to continue working as a police dog.

== Memorial ==
In 2008, the Ashburton District council donated money to assist with a fund proposed for a monument in Rajah's honour be erected in front of the Methven Police station or at the Mt Hutt Memorial hall. The proposal was met with positive community response, and a bronze statue of Rajah was unveiled on 8 February 2015, outside the Mt Hutt Function Centre.

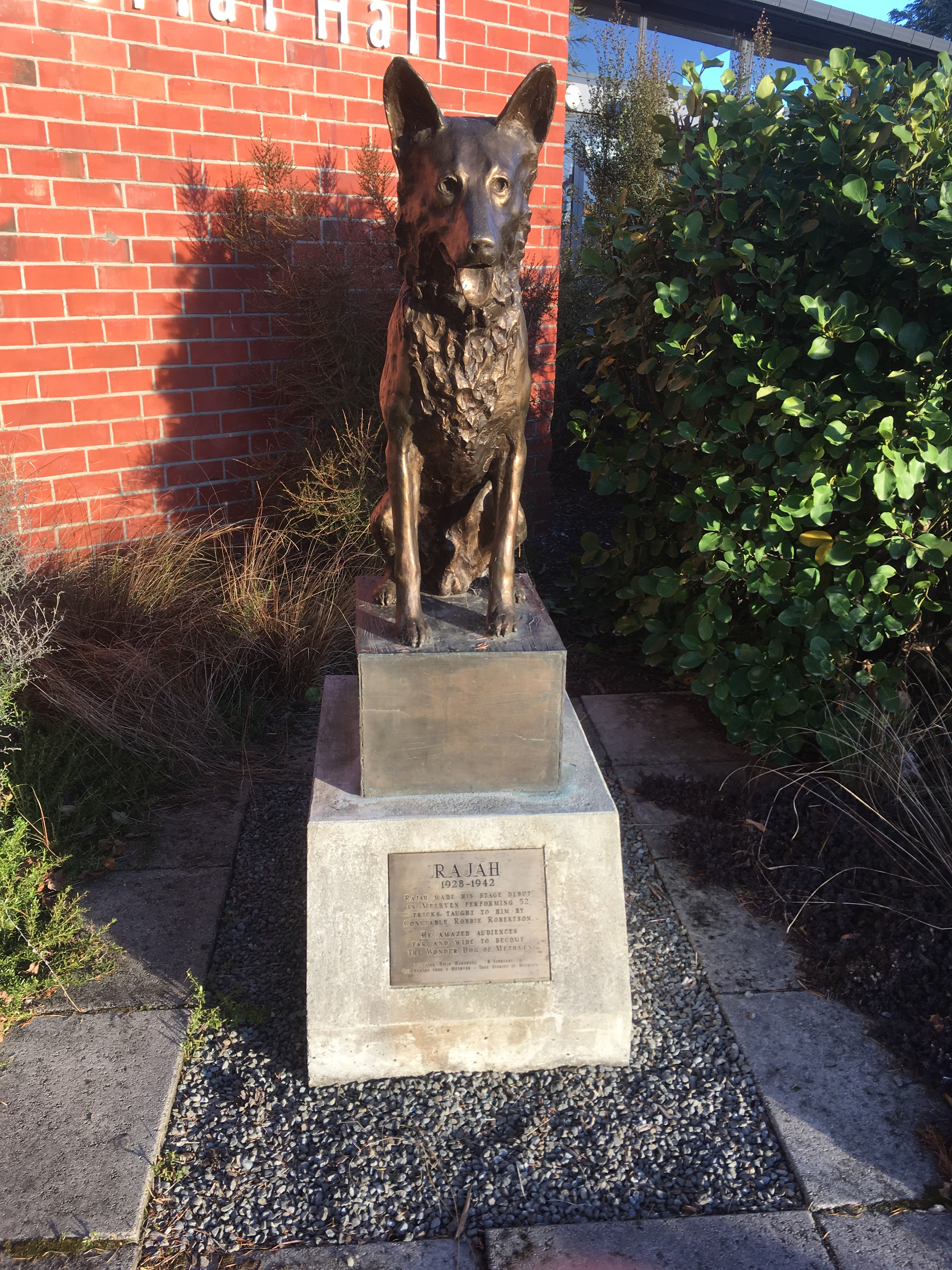
Statue of Rajah, Methven, New Zealand

== See also ==
- List of individual dogs
