= Lake Lyndon =

Lake in Canterbury, New Zealand

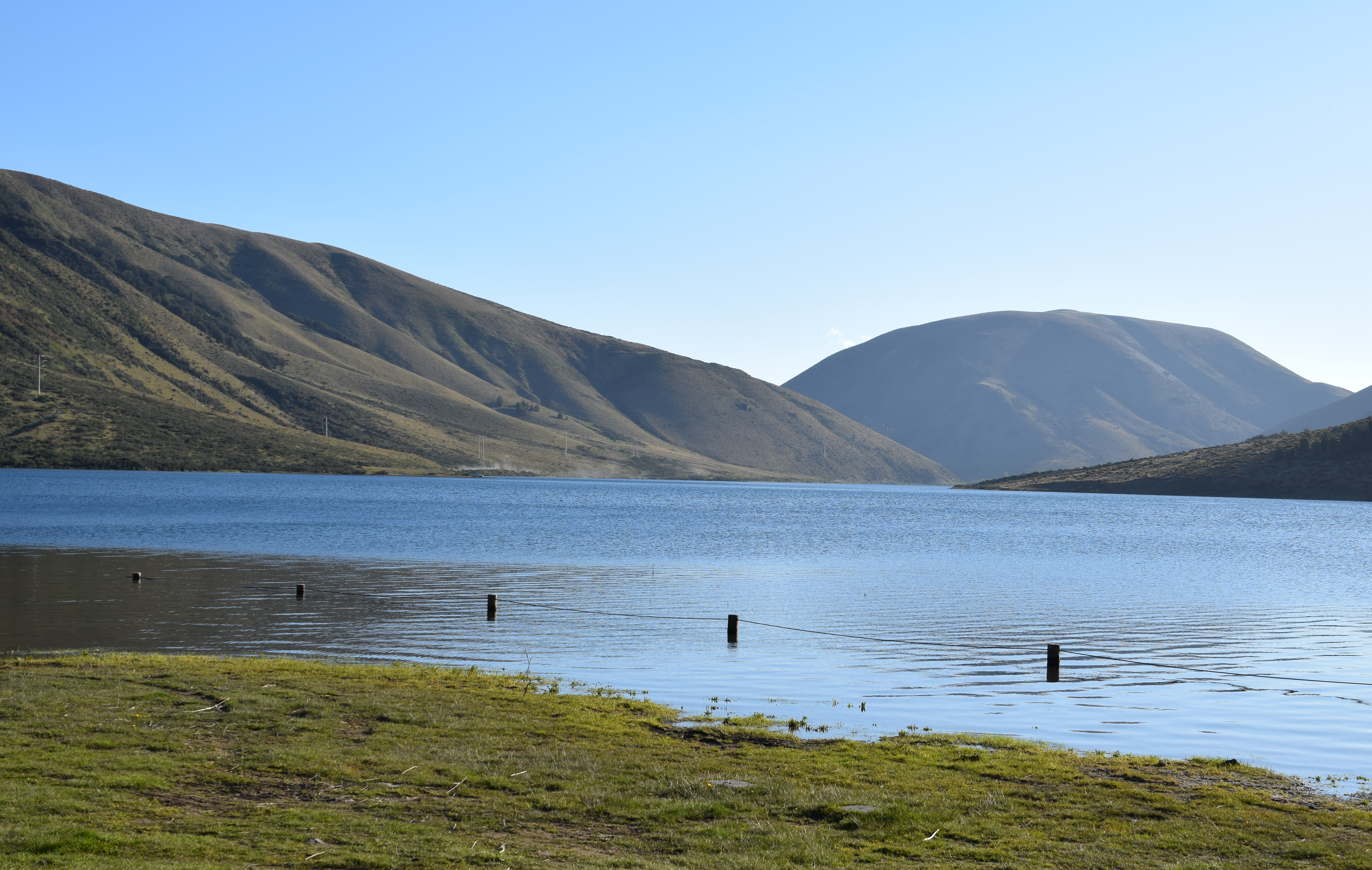
- Lake Lyndon

- Location within South Island
- Location: Canterbury, South Island
- Coordinates: 43°18′S 171°42′E
- Lake type: Glacial
- Primary outflows: Acheron River
- Basin countries: New Zealand
- Surface area: 0.88 km^{2} (0.34 sq mi)
- Max. depth: 18.3 m (60 ft)

Lake Lyndon is a small lake in the Canterbury region of New Zealand's South Island. It is located near Porters Pass on State Highway 73 after Springfield heading into the Southern Alps. The lake regularly freezes in winter due to its elevation and location on the outer border of the Southern Alps.

It is roughly an hour from Christchurch and is a popular site for rainbow trout fishing as the trout population in the lake is thriving due to the dense oxygen weed beds that provide a plentiful food source. The lake is largely surrounded by Korowai / Torlesse Tussocklands Park, and the Acheron River flows from the lake to the Rakaia River. Mount Lyndon is to the west of the lake and Castle Hill Peak is to the north of the lake.

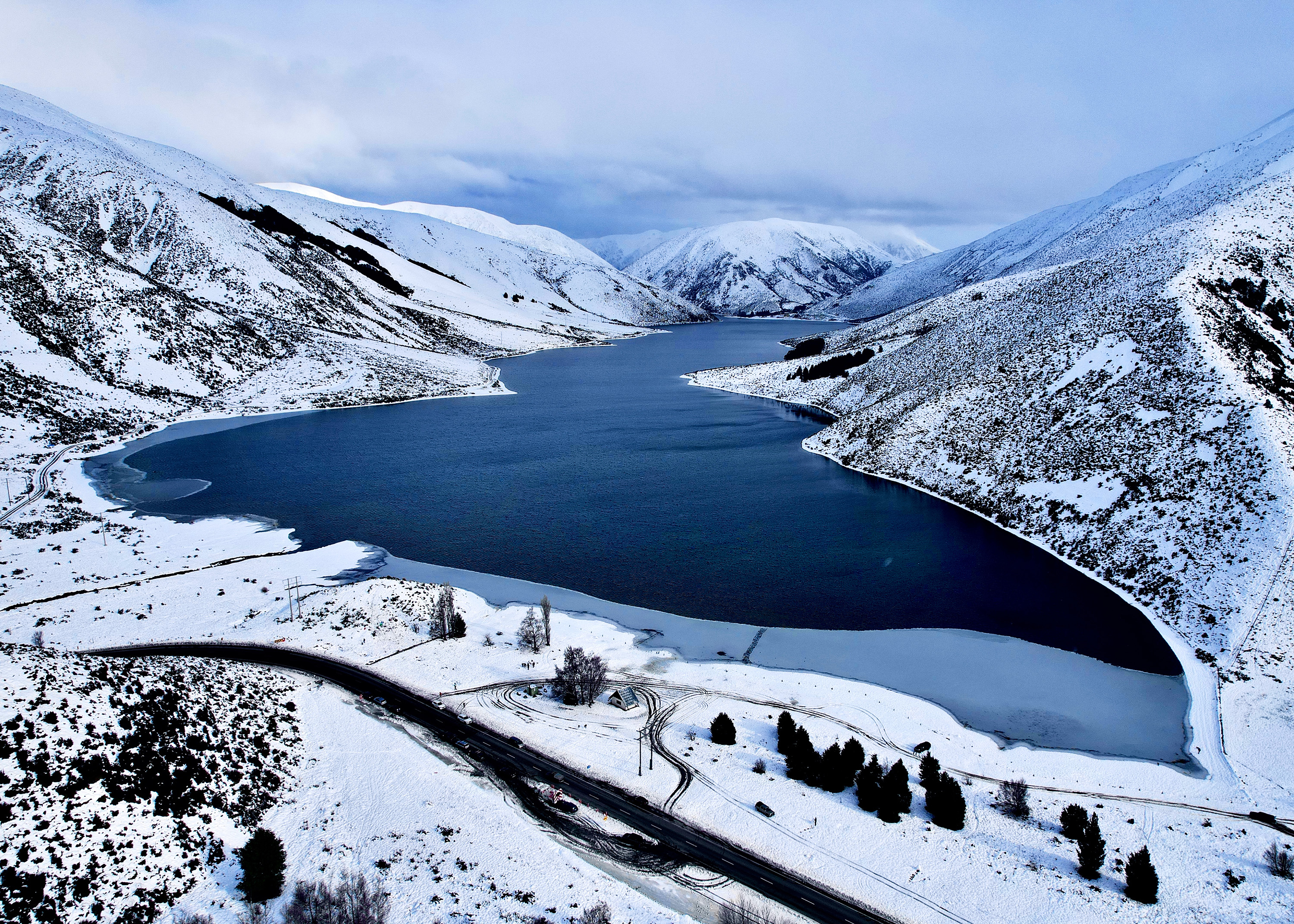
Lake Lyndon in winter

One of the proposed routes for the Midland Line railway to Westland would have left the now-closed Whitecliffs Branch in Homebush and followed the eastern shore of Lake Lyndon on its route to Cass. The route that was built takes a more direct route to Cass and bypasses the lake.
