= Mount Lyndon =

Mountain in New Zealand

Coordinates: 43°18′S 171°41′E

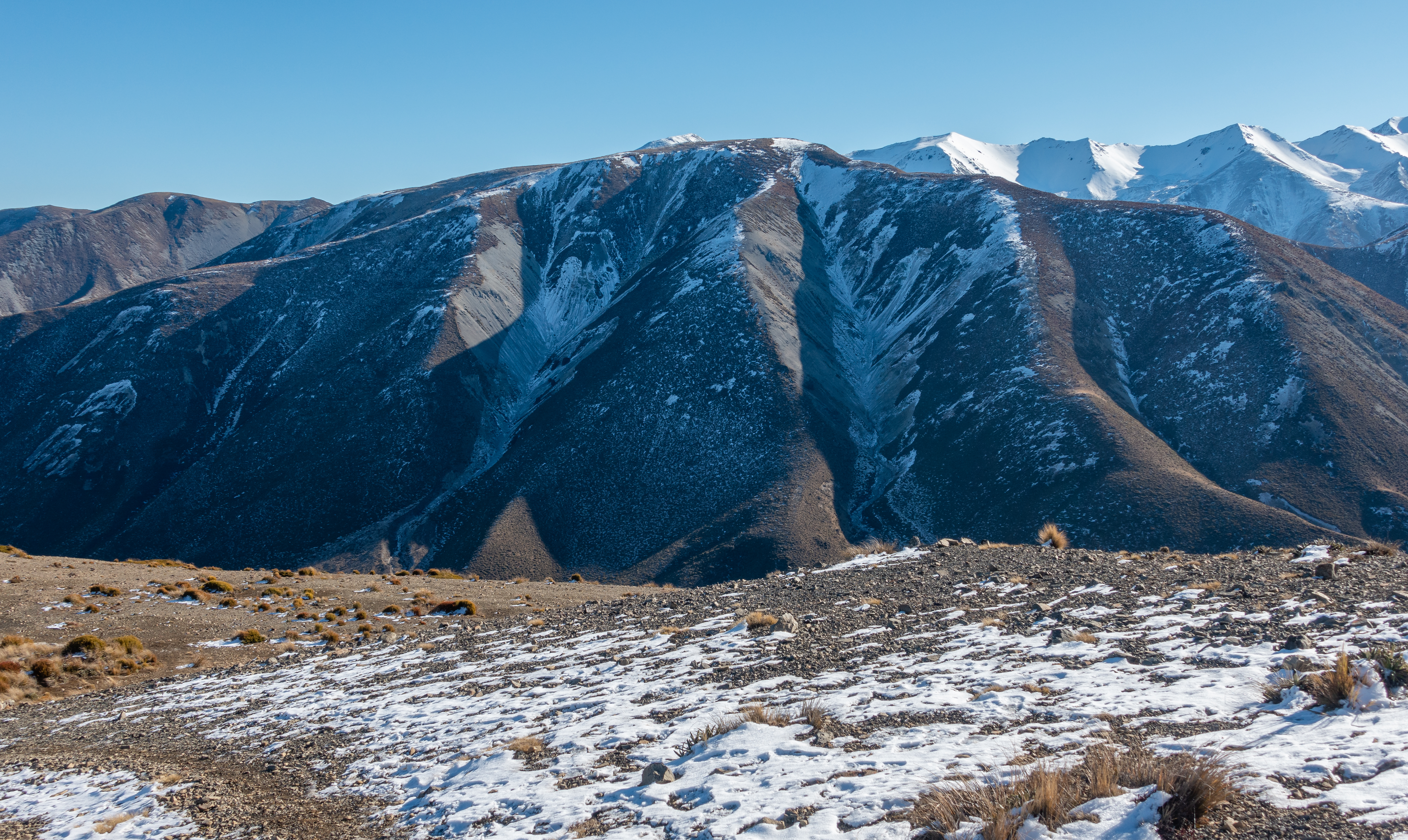
Mount Lyndon

Mount Lyndon is a mountain in the Southern Alps of the Canterbury region of New Zealand's South Island. It has a height of 1,489 metres (4,885 ft) and is located to the west of Lake Lyndon.
