= Rakaia Gorge Bridge =

Bridge in Canterbury, New Zealand

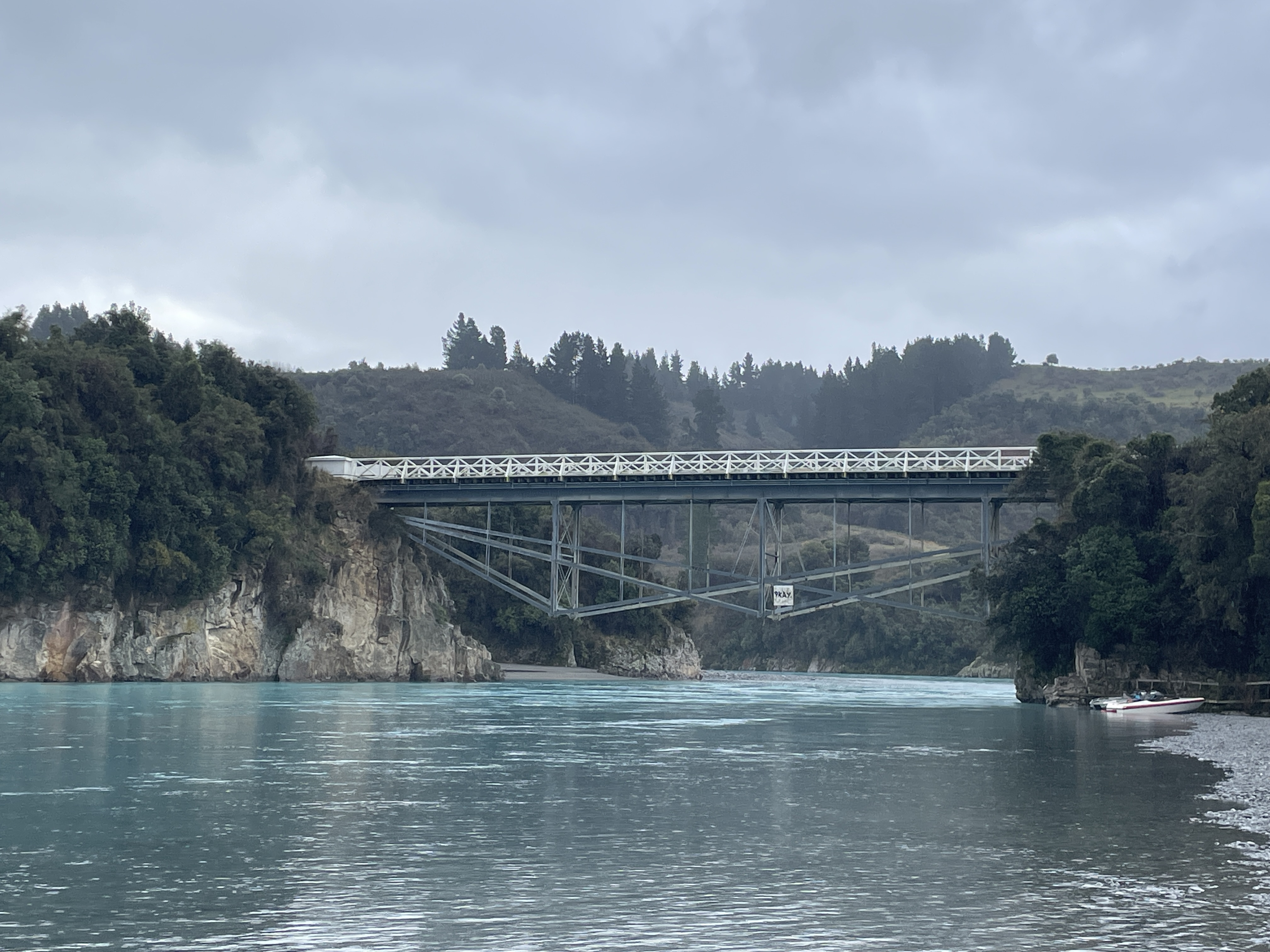
- Rakaia Gorge Bridge as viewed from the riverbed to the East, 2025
- Coordinates: 43°31′03″S 171°39′27″E
- Carries: 1 lane of roadway
- Crosses: Rakaia River
- Locale: Windwhistle, Canterbury
- Maintained by: New Zealand Transport Agency
- Heritage status: Heritage New Zealand Category 1 historic place listing

Characteristics
- Design: Deck truss bridge
- Total length: 55 m (180 ft)
- Width: 4 m (13 ft)

Location
- Interactive map of Rakaia Gorge Bridge

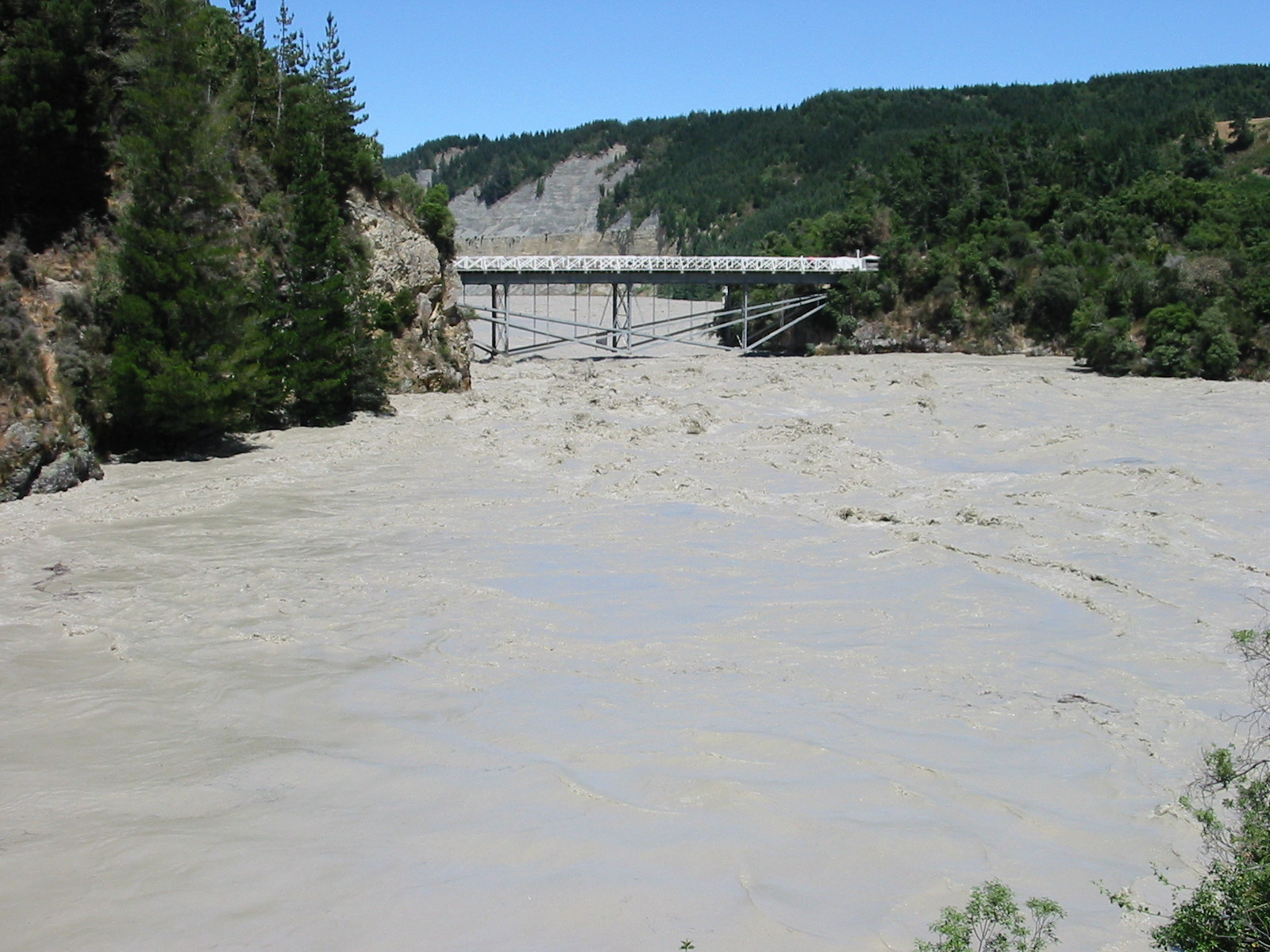
The Rakaia Gorge in flood

The Rakaia Gorge Bridge consists of two bridges, a single lane road bridge located on the Rakaia River in inland Canterbury in New Zealand's South Island known as the Rakaia Gorge Bridge No. 1, and a two lane concrete bridge over the flood channel known as the Rakaia Gorge Bridge No. 2. The bridge connects the Selwyn and Ashburton districts and carries State Highway 77 and the Inland Scenic Route. They are one of only two bridges crossing the Rakaia River, and the oldest, with the other being the Rakaia Bridge, carrying State Highway 1. Construction on the No. 1 bridge was conducted between 1880 and 1882 by contractors W. H. Barnes. It is listed as a category 1 historic place by Heritage New Zealand.

== Description ==
The Rakaia Gorge Bridge No. 1 spans 55 m (180 ft) and features a 4 m (13 ft) wide timber deck and handrail on top of its iron girders and truss. The bridge is thought to be one of the earliest wrought iron bridges in New Zealand, and one of the few 19th century components of the New Zealand state highway network. In September 1985 the bridge was listed as a Category 1 Historic Place by Heritage New Zealand.

=== Similar designs ===
The No. 1 Bridge has a design similar to the Bollman Truss bridge design seen in only one other remaining bridge anywhere in the world, the Bollman Truss Railroad Bridge. The design of that bridge was patented in 1852 by Wendel Bollman, a United States railway engineer, and involves a series of non-symmetrical trussed beams of iron being jointed to vertical members by hinged pins to facilitate construction. More than 100 examples were constructed on railways such as the Baltimore and Ohio Railroad, all of which have now been demolished. Bollman wrote about the design: “This bridge has the advantage of great strength and perfect security, with very little weight of metal". The bridge design enjoyed great success for a number of years before it was superseded by more economic and effective bridge designs.

For many years, those in the New Zealand engineering community believed the No. 1 bridge to be a Bollman Truss, with the School of Engineering in Christchurch even teaching prospective civil engineers that the bridge followed this design. However, the No. 1 bridge differs from the works of Bollman in that the diagonal ties are anchored at each end by concrete-filled sockets that are tunnelled into the rock outcrops on which the abutments are placed.

The bridge also closely resembles the Fink truss bridge design, used commonly throughout US railroad development. These similarities may be attributed to the experience of John Carruthers, an engineer heavily involved in the design who worked in the United States throughout the 1860s, during which time both the Bollman and Fink truss designs were commonplace.

== History ==
=== Ferry and bridge prospects ===
The Rakaia Gorge was an important route for drovers and early settlers during the early 1850's, when it formed a part of the main route to inland Canterbury by settlers travelling from Christchurch. In 1851, the Phillips family constructed an accommodation house at the gorge and began a ferry service across the mouth of the gorge soon after that. John Bryan was an early ferryman who went on to construct a larger accommodation house at the site with his wife, but this house burnt down in 1874.

A bridge across the gorge was first considered in 1863, during planning for the main south railway line from Christchurch. Some suggested that instead of crossing the Rakaia River near the mouth where it is at its widest, the line deviate inland and cross the gorge. There were concerns about shifting shingle, an unstable river bed, and notably the length of bridge that would be needed near the mouth, however, in 1864, a commission determined that the gorge route should be abandoned, and the route cross the Rakaia River downstream near the mouth, resulting in the longest bridge in the Southern Hemisphere at the time of construction.

By 1873, pressure was mounting from local land owners about the need for a bridge over the gorge to facilitate faster travel across the river. The provincial engineer initially examined two sites, one being at Goat Island (its present day location), and one further upstream. There was also intense debate over what the bridge should be designed to carry, whether it be just pedestrians and stock, drays, locomotive traffic or even rail. The discussion was further confused by the two tiered system of government at the time, provincial, and central.

The Secretary of Public Works finally contacted the Canterbury Provincial Engineer George Thornton in 1875 requesting an initial design. The early design was expected to cost £15,000 and consisted of two iron bridges and a cutting over Goat Island. The first bridge would have a span of 67 m (220 ft), and the second 47 m (154 ft), with both capable of carrying light automotive traffic. One of Thornton's assistants, W. G. Bull, regarding the feasibility of a bridge at this location, remarked "[The bridge would be] blown clean away from the towers before six months were over" and that "taking all circumstances into consideration we may dismiss from our mind the practicality of bridging the river at this point".

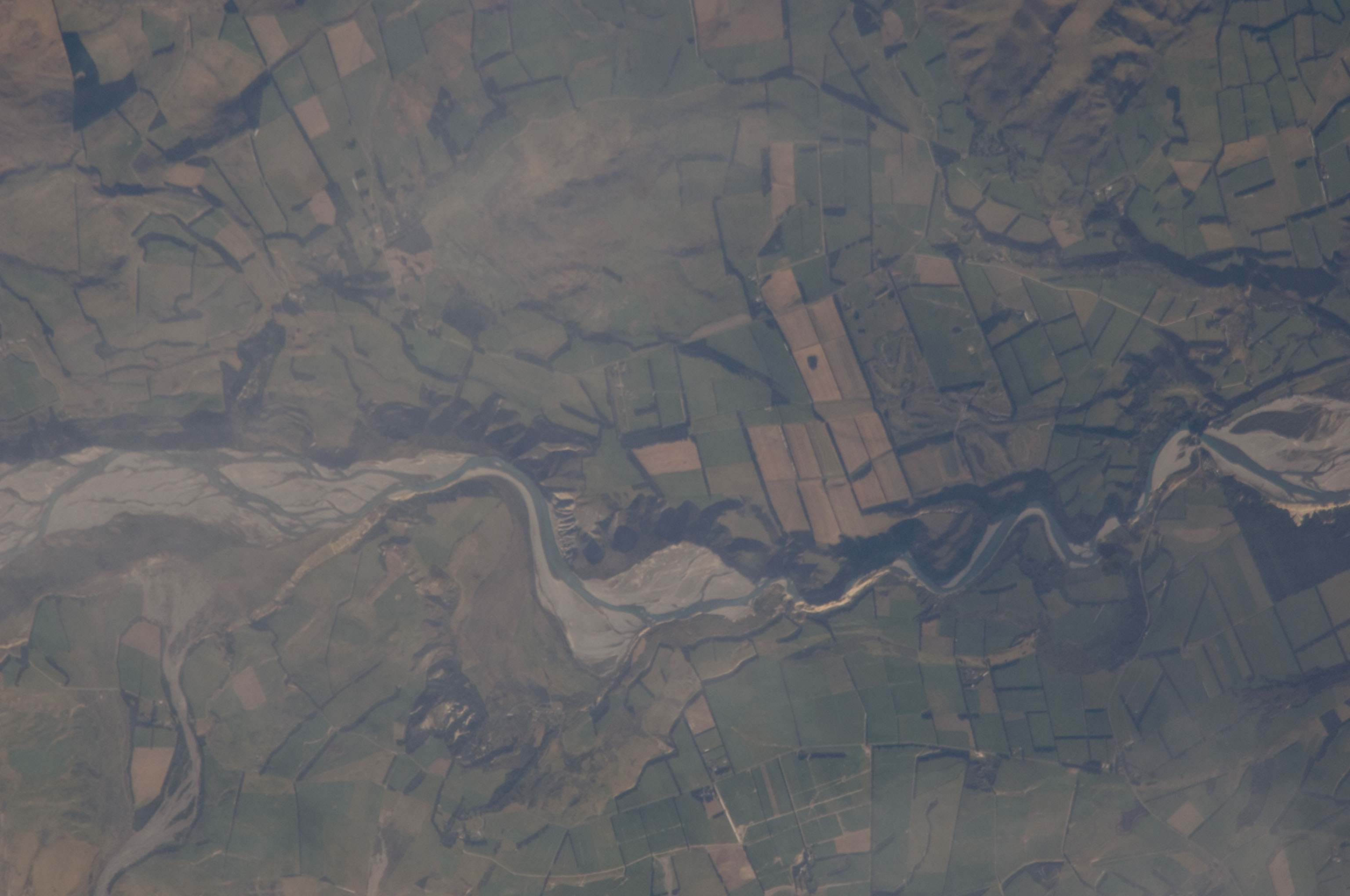
Aerial view of the Rakaia Gorge, with the bridge visible in the centre-right

On 27 July 1876, Engineer-in-Chief of the Public Works Department (PWD), John Carruthers, reported to the Minister that while he agreed with the site, he did not think a suspension bridge was appropriate. He instead suggested a pier mid-river for the first bridge and removal of the second bridge, favouring an embankment to cut off the flood channel entirely. Thornton was staunchly opposed to this design, and on 24 October wrote to the Secretary of Public Works stating that Carruthers' proposal would result in flooding of the site where the accommodation house lay, and the cost of the bridge would be increased by the pier, which would be liable to damage from flooding.

=== Design and construction ===
At the time of planning and construction, the New Zealand Government had recently been centralised and the PWD restructured, resulting in several high-profile engineers being involved in the design and construction. Involved engineers included Thornton, Carruthers, William Newsham Blair, and Peter Seton Hay. Designers and engineers had to contend with an elevation of 17 m (56 ft) from the usual water level, flows of up to 6,000 cubic metres per second in flood, and wind speeds regularly reaching above 160 km/h (99 mph).

The final plans for the bridge were registered in July 1876. The final design is referenced on the plans as being designed by a "Wood", although records return no biographical details of Mr. Wood, nor his precise role in the project.

In 1877 the PWD concluded debate on the bridge and decided to move forward with construction of a single lane road traffic bridge with the opportunity to carry rail if needed. The opportunity for carrying rail was included due to prospects at the time regarding the South Island Central Trunk Railway, which would run along the foothills of the Southern Alps. This railway never eventuated, and therefore the bridge never ended up carrying rail.

The Public Works Department had called for tenders twice before finally finding a willing contractor, and in the end the bridge was constructed by W. H. Barnes of Oamaru for a payment of £3,619. The iron for the project was produced in England, and delivered to Coalgate by September 1879. Construction took much longer than expected, primarily due to two large slips in 1881 that needed to be cleared by the contractors before work could proceed, and as a result Barnes were penalised by £306, resulting in a final payment for completing the project of £3,313. Construction was finally completed in 1882, however road traffic could only begin using the bridge in 1884 when the flood channel was bridged with a timber bridge.

As early as 1890, wind resistance of the structures was a concern and further work was conducted by Peter Seton Hay to design additional wind bracing for both bridges. This came as a result of damage from wind gusts in late 1889. No major repair work has been conducted since, with minor upgrades between 2005 and 2011, and regular maintenance from the New Zealand Transport Agency.

=== Flood channel bridge (No. 2 bridge) ===
In 1884, a wooden bridge was constructed across the flood channel, between Goat Island and the southern bank of the gorge. This bridge had a main span of 36 m (118 ft) and three smaller side spans, constructed by the contractor Daulby. This wooden bridge was replaced by the present reinforced concrete bridge in 1945, following concerns from the War Cabinet.

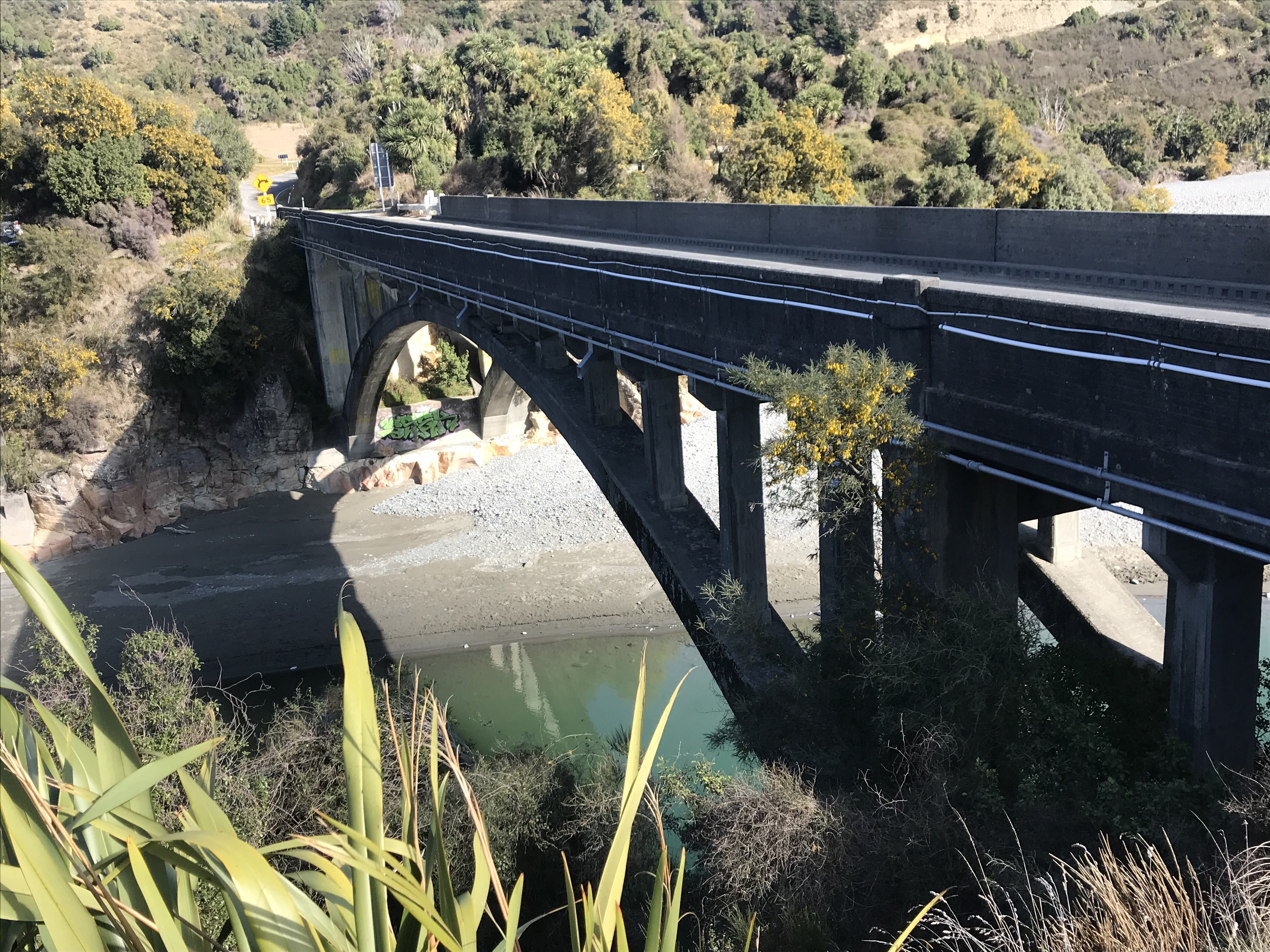
Rakaia Bridge No. 2 bridging the flood channel as viewed from Goat Island

In 1942, when the Japanese military forces were moving south in the Pacific during World War II, there were concerns regarding a military attack on New Zealand. The existing wooden bridge could not carry a Matilda I tank as the bridge had an estimated 5 ton axle load. Urgency was given by the War Cabinet to design and construct a reinforced concrete bridge over the flood channel to replace the wooden bridge, and as a temporary solution, large concrete culverts were laid which were promptly swept away in flood. The width of this bridge was doubled to 7 metres, as opposed to a narrower one lane bridge.

=== Social and economic significance ===
The bridge initially served the local farming communities, who were experiencing substantial growth in the tail end of the 19th century. The bridge across the Rakaia Gorge further boosted economic activity stimulated by the construction of the Rakaia to Methven branch railway, and assisted in the development of several main roads throughout the 1880s by the Mount Hutt Road Board.

On top of serving farming interests, the bridge is also vital for those coming to Mount Hutt for recreation purposes. As early as 1880, people from across the South Island were coming to Mount Hutt, with the primary intent of scaling Mount Hutt and adjacent mountains. In 1969, plans for a Mount Hutt ski field began, and it became operational within a few years. In 1976 the Rakaia to Methven branch railway closed, hitting the economy hard, however the addition of the new ski field supported Methven and continues to be a strong pillar of its economy today.
