= Windwhistle =

Town in Canterbury, New Zealand

Coordinates: 43.515°S 171.708°E

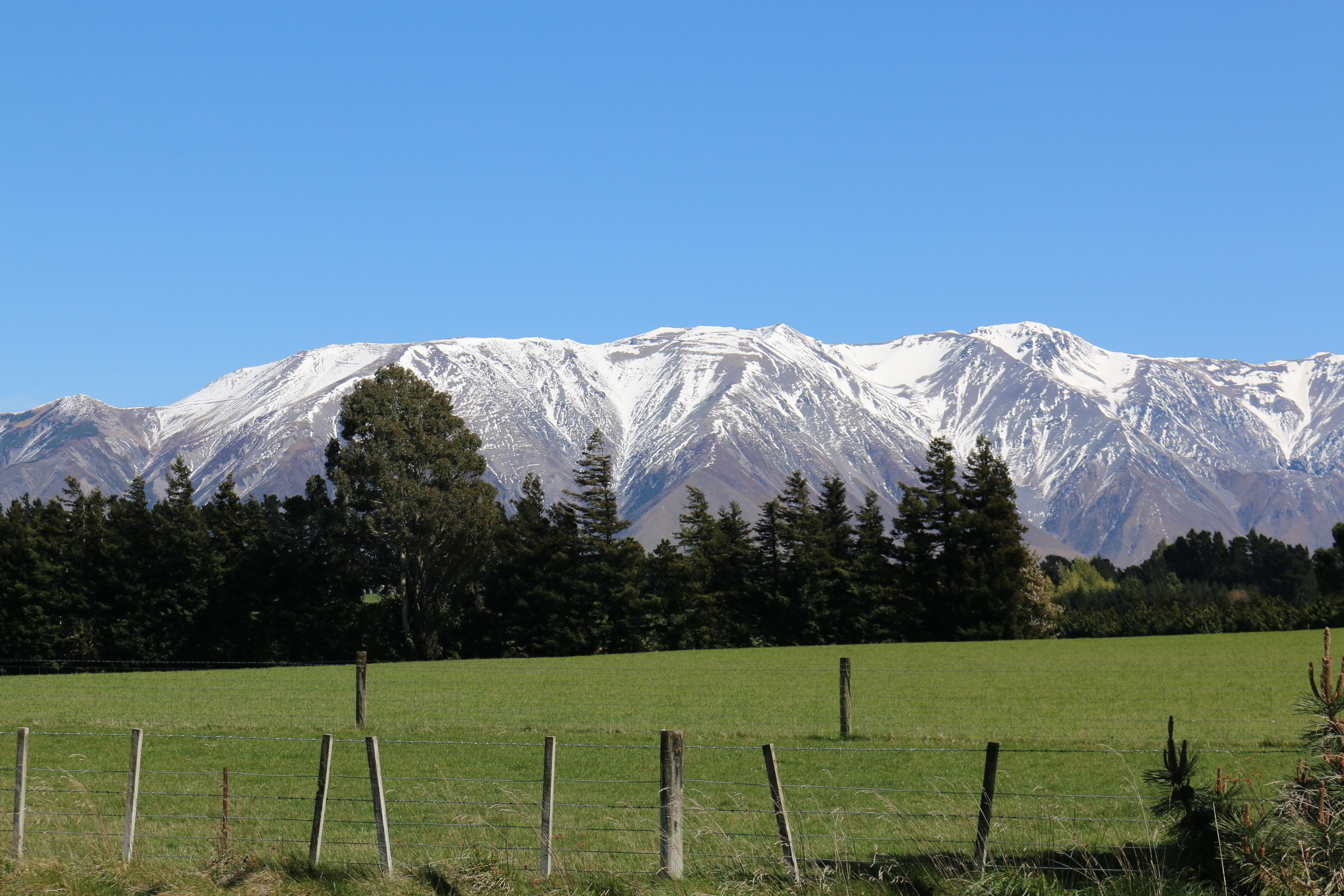
View of Mount Hutt from Windwhistle

Location of Windwhistle in New Zealand

Windwhistle is a small farming settlement in the Selwyn District of New Zealand. It is located on State Highway 77 near the Rakaia Gorge. Windwhistle is 81 kilometres drive to the west of Christchurch and 22 kilometres north of Methven. Windwhistle's name comes from the way the wind sounds when the Canterbury north west wind blows.

== Washpen Falls ==
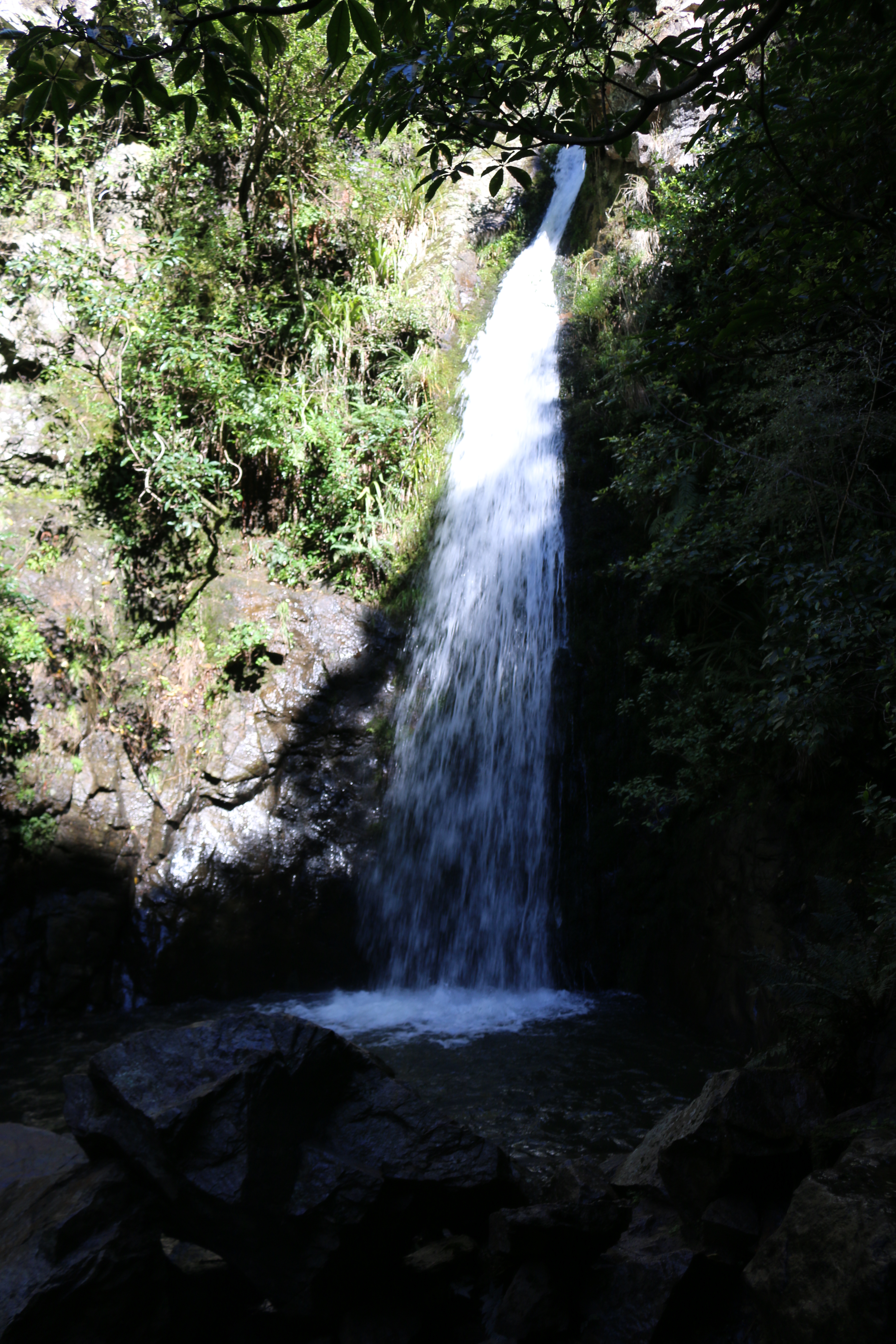
Washpen Falls, Canterbury, New Zealand

The Washpen Falls walk is located near Windwhistle on Washpen Road. It is a well maintained day walk to a waterfall on a private track. The walk goes through a canyon which was formed by an extinct volcano. The track is surrounded by native bush and many native birds can be seen and heard. Parts of the 2015 movie Z for Zachariah were filmed at Washpen Falls.

== School ==
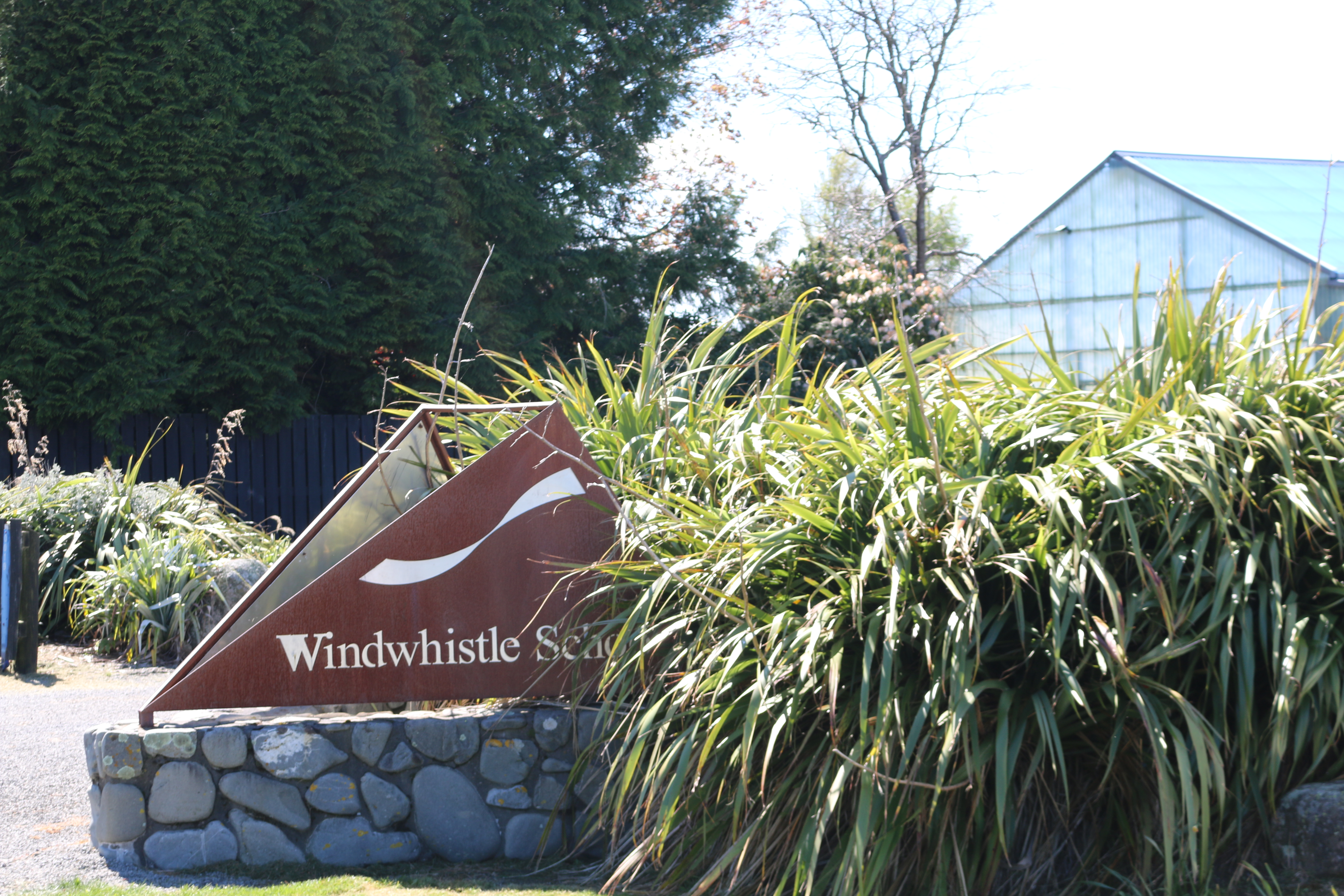
Windwhistle School in 2020

Windwhistle school is a primary school for years 1 to 6 with a roll of 31 as of July 2026. It was established in 1935. It has a heated swimming pool.

== Sport ==
=== Winter sports ===
The Windwhistle Winter Sports Club (WWSC) was founded in 1932. Ice-skating at Lake Ida was their first endeavor. In 1948 the club started to develop Mount Olympus as a ski field. The rope tow was installed in 1952. The ski field has developed since then with plenty of voluntary contributions to build the accommodation and ski lodge on the mountain. Other facilities include a hot tub and curling. Mount Olympus Ski Field was unable to open in 2020.

=== Golf ===
Terrace Downs golf resort is located 6 kilometres away from Windwhistle. The resort has an 18-hole golf course, restaurant, wedding and conference facilities and 52 apartments there are 26 free-standing chalet-style homes. The resort was for sale after the owner died of COVID-19 in April 2020.

== Climate ==
Climate data for Windwhistle (Snowdon Raws), elevation 560 m (1,840 ft), (1991–2020)
Month	Jan	Feb	Mar	Apr	May	Jun	Jul	Aug	Sep	Oct	Nov	Dec	Year
Mean daily maximum °C (°F)	21.5 (70.7)	21.5 (70.7)	19.1 (66.4)	15.8 (60.4)	13.0 (55.4)	9.9 (49.8)	9.4 (48.9)	10.9 (51.6)	13.2 (55.8)	15.2 (59.4)	17.3 (63.1)	19.7 (67.5)	15.5 (60.0)
Daily mean °C (°F)	15.7 (60.3)	15.5 (59.9)	13.5 (56.3)	10.6 (51.1)	8.4 (47.1)	5.6 (42.1)	5.0 (41.0)	6.3 (43.3)	8.5 (47.3)	10.1 (50.2)	11.8 (53.2)	14.0 (57.2)	10.4 (50.8)
Mean daily minimum °C (°F)	9.9 (49.8)	9.4 (48.9)	7.9 (46.2)	5.4 (41.7)	3.7 (38.7)	1.2 (34.2)	0.6 (33.1)	1.7 (35.1)	3.7 (38.7)	5.0 (41.0)	6.3 (43.3)	8.3 (46.9)	5.3 (41.5)
Average rainfall mm (inches)	94.0 (3.70)	61.1 (2.41)	62.3 (2.45)	82.8 (3.26)	103 (4.1)	92.1 (3.63)	76.2 (3.00)	101.2 (3.98)	70.2 (2.76)	100.7 (3.96)	78.9 (3.11)	77.3 (3.04)	999.8 (39.4)
Source: NIWA

== See also ==
- List of towns in New Zealand
