= Methven, New Zealand =

Town in Canterbury, New Zealand

Methven
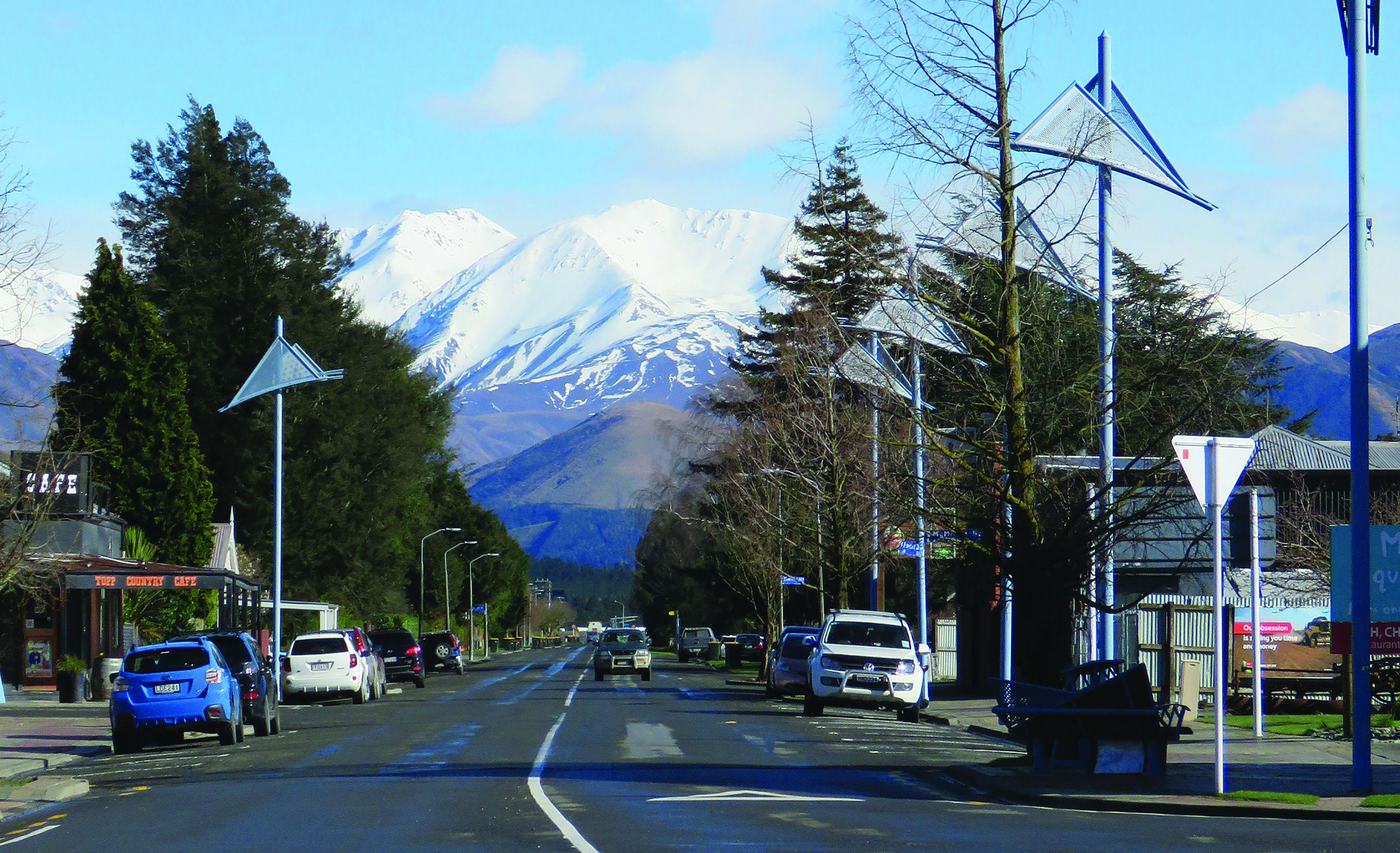
- Methven town centre
- Interactive map of Methven
- Coordinates: 43°38′S 171°39′E
- Country: New Zealand
- Region: Canterbury
- Territorial authority: Ashburton District
- Community board: Methven Community Board
- Ward: Western
- Electorates: Rangitata; Te Tai Tonga (Māori)

Government
  - Territorial authority: Ashburton District Council
  - Regional council: Environment Canterbury
  - Mayor of Ashburton: Liz McMillan
  - Rangitata MP: James Meager
  - Te Tai Tonga MP: Mananui Ramsden

Area
  - Total: 4.77 km^{2} (1.84 sq mi)
- Elevation: 320 m (1,050 ft)

Population (June 2025)
  - Total: 2,170
  - Density: 455/km^{2} (1,180/sq mi)
- Postcode: 7730
- Area code: 03

Methven is a small town in the Canterbury region of the South Island of New Zealand. It is located near the western edge of the Canterbury Plains, 34 km (21 mi) north of Ashburton and 95 km (59 mi) west of Christchurch, and at an elevation of 320 m (1,050 ft). The town is a service centre for agriculture in the surrounding area, and is a base for skiing at the nearby Mount Hutt skifield. The town slogan is "Amazing Space".

== History ==
In 1869, Robert Patton purchased a 500 acres (200 ha) farm property and called it Methven, after the name of his old home town in Perthshire, Scotland. In 1879 the name of the farm became the name of the town and surrounding district. The town was 6km away from the farm at the railhead. Sections in the township were offered for sale by public auction on 24 June 1878 at South Rakaia, and sold for between 20 and 95 pounds.

In 1879, Robert Patton applied to the Ashburton Licensing Court for a license to operate a new house at Methven to be called the Methven Hotel. A hotel was built in 1880. In 1882, Patton applied to the Licensing District of Mount Hutt for a publican's license for the 24 room Methven hotel. The Methven Branch railway line from Rakaia to Methven was completed in 1880. The terminus of the railway line was at the junction of six roads, in the centre of the town as it stands today. By 1882–83, further sections of land were sold around the area that would subsequently become the town of Methven. By the time that Robert Patton died on 20 October 1889, Methven had a butcher, baker, grocer, draper and a blacksmiths, in addition to the hotel.

The Methven School was opened on 7 February 1882, with an opening school roll of 41. The first chairman of the school committee was Robert Patton. The school remained as a primary school, until secondary schooling was established in Methven in 1925.

A notable early farmer in the Methven district was Duncan Cameron. He was initially the manager of a large 21,000 acres (8,500 ha) property called Springfield, employing 100 men through the year, and 200 during harvesting. Cameron became the owner of the Springfield property in 1890. He had 4,000 acres (1,600 ha) in crops most years, and in one year had 5,500 acres in wheat. He was an early pioneer of irrigation in the district. By 1876, he had constructed 13 miles (21 km) of water races at Springfield, and this grew to 40 miles (64 km) by 1880. His use of irrigation enabled cropping and increased stock-carrying, and led the way for later investments in irrigation in the district. Cameron was also a pioneer for the frozen meat export industry.

The Mount Hutt Road Board office was completed in 1879. Despite the depression of the 1880s and 1890s, the Methven library was built in 1883. The Anglican church was built in 1880 and the Catholic church in 1888. The population of Methven town was 300 people in 1902. Methven contributed troops to the First World War with 69 of them losing their lives. In the 1920s, Methven slowly changed from having livery stables and smithies to garages and engineering firms to service cars and farm machinery. The 1920s also saw the arrival in Methven of companies such as Dalgety's and Wright Stevenson and Co. Trucking firms also aimed to compete with the railways to ship farm goods such as wool to the ports. Electricity also arrived around this time. The farm labourers who worked on the local farms often resided in Methven, or came to Methven to socialize after work. Farm labourers frequented the grocery stores, clothing retailer, pubs, billiard halls, brothels, and boarding houses that were present in Methven in the early days of the town. For the first 100 years of Methven's existence, its primary role was that of servicing the needs of farmers and farm labour. The Methven branch railway line closed in 1976.

The Mountain Thunder motorcycle street race was an annual event held in Methven on Easter Saturday for eight years until 2017 when there was a fatality in one of the races and the organisers announced later that year that the 2017 event would be the last.

Methven expanded dramatically in 2021 with over three hundred residential sections sold. By 2023 the population was expected to be 2411 people; a figure that was previously forecast to be reached only in another 25 years.

== Geography ==
Methven is a rural town situated on the Canterbury Plains, between the North Branch of the Ashburton River and the Rakaia River. The town centre is at an elevation of 320 m (1,050 ft). It is located close to the foothills of the Southern Alps, and in particular Mount Somers, Mount Alford and the Mount Hutt range. The town is 34 km (21 mi) north of Ashburton and 95 km (59 mi) west of Christchurch.

The town is a rural service centre for nationally significant arable farming land in the upper mid Canterbury plains. The region has hot summers, cold winters and good soils that enable seed production, growing of cereal crops, and raising livestock. The early land-holdings in the area were large leasehold estates growing wheat and raising sheep. However, with the introduction of farm machinery in the 1920's, more family-run farms were established, leading to an increasing population in the town.

== Governance ==
Methven is part of the Rangitata electorate. The Ashburton District Council is responsible for providing local government services to Methven.

== Demographics ==
Methven is described by Statistics New Zealand as a small urban area, and covers 4.77 km^{2} (1.84 sq mi). It had an estimated population of 2,170 as of June 2025, with a population density of 455 people per km^{2}.

Historical populations for Methven
Year	Pop.	±% p.a.
2006	1,404	—
2013	1,719	+2.93%
2018	1,779	+0.69%
2023	1,977	+2.13%
The 2006 population is for a smaller area of 4.18 km^{2}. Source:

Methven had a population of 1,977 in the 2023 New Zealand census, an increase of 198 people (11.1%) since the 2018 census, and an increase of 258 people (15.0%) since the 2013 census. There were 1,002 males, 972 females, and 3 people of other genders in 834 dwellings. 2.6% of people identified as LGBTIQ+. The median age was 39.6 years (compared with 38.1 years nationally). There were 363 people (18.4%) aged under 15 years, 327 (16.5%) aged 15 to 29, 918 (46.4%) aged 30 to 64, and 372 (18.8%) aged 65 or older.

People could identify as more than one ethnicity. The results were 90.4% European (Pākehā); 10.0% Māori; 2.9% Pasifika; 3.2% Asian; 0.8% Middle Eastern, Latin American and African New Zealanders (MELAA); and 4.4% other, which includes people giving their ethnicity as "New Zealander". English was spoken by 97.1%, Māori by 1.2%, and other languages by 9.4%. No language could be spoken by 1.5% (e.g. too young to talk). New Zealand Sign Language was known by 0.3%. The percentage of people born overseas was 22.9, compared with 28.8% nationally.

Religious affiliations were 31.4% Christian, 0.5% Hindu, 0.2% Māori religious beliefs, 0.3% Buddhist, 0.2% New Age, and 1.4% other religions. People who answered that they had no religion were 59.5%, and 6.8% of people did not answer the census question.

Of those at least 15 years old, 336 (20.8%) people had a bachelor's or higher degree, 894 (55.4%) had a post-high school certificate or diploma, and 381 (23.6%) people exclusively held high school qualifications. The median income was $45,600, compared with $41,500 nationally. 168 people (10.4%) earned over $100,000 compared to 12.1% nationally. The employment status of those at least 15 was 924 (57.2%) full-time, 273 (16.9%) part-time, and 30 (1.9%) unemployed.

=== Cairnbrae ===
Cairnbrae statistical area surrounds but does not include Methven, and covers 541.21 km^{2} (208.96 sq mi). It had an estimated population of 1,540 as of June 2025, with a population density of 2.8 people per km^{2}.

Historical populations for Cairnbrae
Year	Pop.	±% p.a.
2006	1,236	—
2013	1,404	+1.84%
2018	1,449	+0.63%
2023	1,404	−0.63%
The 2006 population is for a larger area of 542.76 km^{2}. Source:

Cairnbrae had a population of 1,404 in the 2023 New Zealand census, a decrease of 45 people (−3.1%) since the 2018 census, and unchanged since the 2013 census. There were 741 males, 657 females, and 3 people of other genders in 552 dwellings. 1.9% of people identified as LGBTIQ+. The median age was 37.6 years (compared with 38.1 years nationally). There were 309 people (22.0%) aged under 15 years, 255 (18.2%) aged 15 to 29, 678 (48.3%) aged 30 to 64, and 165 (11.8%) aged 65 or older.

People could identify as more than one ethnicity. The results were 78.8% European (Pākehā); 7.5% Māori; 0.9% Pasifika; 16.5% Asian; 1.3% Middle Eastern, Latin American and African New Zealanders (MELAA); and 2.8% other, which includes people giving their ethnicity as "New Zealander". English was spoken by 97.2%, Māori by 1.3%, and other languages by 10.0%. No language could be spoken by 1.9% (e.g. too young to talk). New Zealand Sign Language was known by 0.2%. The percentage of people born overseas was 26.7, compared with 28.8% nationally.

Religious affiliations were 44.4% Christian, 1.9% Hindu, 0.4% Islam, 0.2% Māori religious beliefs, 0.9% Buddhist, and 0.2% other religions. People who answered that they had no religion were 45.5%, and 6.4% of people did not answer the census question.

Of those at least 15 years old, 243 (22.2%) people had a bachelor's or higher degree, 609 (55.6%) had a post-high school certificate or diploma, and 249 (22.7%) people exclusively held high school qualifications. The median income was $53,000, compared with $41,500 nationally. 132 people (12.1%) earned over $100,000 compared to 12.1% nationally. The employment status of those at least 15 was 672 (61.4%) full-time, 198 (18.1%) part-time, and 15 (1.4%) unemployed.

== Climate ==
The warmest months of the year are January and February, with an average high temperature of 22 °C. The coldest month of the year occurs in July, when the average high temperature is 9 °C (48 °F). Monthly rainfall ranges between an average of 76 mm (3.0 in) in April to 103 mm (4.1 in) in July. Snow falls a few days each year in Methven in the winter months of June, July and August.

Climate data for Methven, elevation 313 m (1,027 ft), (1991–2020)
Month	Jan	Feb	Mar	Apr	May	Jun	Jul	Aug	Sep	Oct	Nov	Dec	Year
Mean daily maximum °C (°F)	21.8 (71.2)	21.6 (70.9)	19.5 (67.1)	16.5 (61.7)	14.4 (57.9)	11.2 (52.2)	10.8 (51.4)	11.8 (53.2)	14.1 (57.4)	16.0 (60.8)	17.8 (64.0)	19.8 (67.6)	16.3 (61.3)
Daily mean °C (°F)	16.2 (61.2)	16.0 (60.8)	14.3 (57.7)	11.5 (52.7)	9.4 (48.9)	6.5 (43.7)	6.1 (43.0)	7.2 (45.0)	9.2 (48.6)	10.9 (51.6)	12.5 (54.5)	14.6 (58.3)	11.2 (52.2)
Mean daily minimum °C (°F)	10.6 (51.1)	10.5 (50.9)	9.1 (48.4)	6.5 (43.7)	4.4 (39.9)	1.8 (35.2)	1.3 (34.3)	2.5 (36.5)	4.3 (39.7)	5.7 (42.3)	7.2 (45.0)	9.4 (48.9)	6.1 (43.0)
Average rainfall mm (inches)	71.6 (2.82)	59.1 (2.33)	67.1 (2.64)	83.3 (3.28)	71.3 (2.81)	77.3 (3.04)	73.5 (2.89)	68.7 (2.70)	61.2 (2.41)	76.3 (3.00)	75.1 (2.96)	85.0 (3.35)	869.5 (34.23)
Source: NIWA

== Rural services centre ==
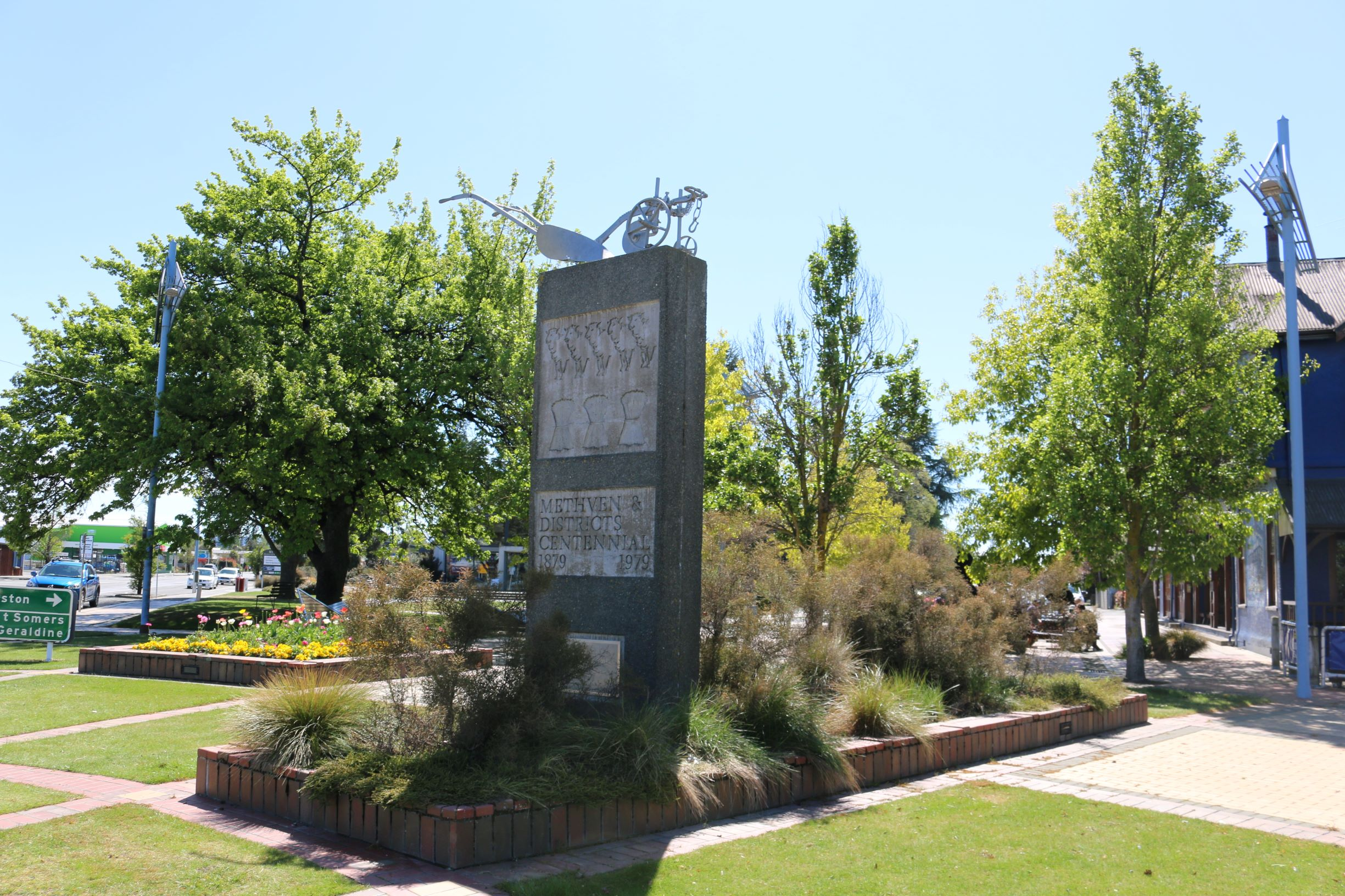
Statue commemorating the centennial of Methven and Districts (1879–1979)

Methven is a rural service town that supports the local region. Dairy farming, sharecropping, sheep farming and seed production and distribution are major players in the farming industry around Methven.

The Mount Hutt Memorial Hall (160 Main Street, Methven) contains the New Zealand Alpine & Agriculture Encounter. It aims to provide an understanding of farming in the area.

Methven has an annual A & P Show each year at the A & P Show grounds in Methven. The 2020 A & P show was cancelled due to the Covid-19 Lockdown in New Zealand.

== Ski town ==
In 1971, the Methven Lions Club studied whether Mount Hutt could be developed into a ski field. The study suggested that this was possible and it led to the opening of a skifield in 1973. Mount Hutt skifield is around half an hour away from Methven. Although the majority of skiers usually made the journey to Mount Hutt from Christchurch on a daily basis, some would stay the weekend in Methven and need accommodation, dinner and services. This led to the establishment of a number of hotels, motels, restaurants and other tourist activities being developed. The town centre was redeveloped with 14 new shops built in 1975. Development continued and by 1989 Methven had five hotels, three motels, twenty ski lodges, two camping grounds and nine restaurants.

During winter, Methven undergoes a significant transformation. A number of cafes, bars, and restaurants lie relatively dormant over the summer months, but become busy during the ski season. Similarly, the town's accommodation providers have a strongly seasonal trade. The New Zealand Ski Heritage Museum was established in 2000. It is located in the Mount Hutt Memorial Hall (160 Main Street, Methven). It includes ski fashions, antique ski equipment and Winter Olympic memorabilia. Methven is also a base for heliskiing in the Arrowsmith range of mountains. The annual Peak to Pub race starts at the top of Mount Hutt where competitors ski two kilometres ski down the mountain to the car park. This is followed by an 18 km mountain bike ride down the ski road, followed by a 12 km run into Methven.

Methven tourism businesses struggled in 2020 due to the Covid-19 virus. The Methven Resort Hotel was placed into liquidation in June 2020. The hotel had a 100-seat restaurant, a large swimming pool and multiple spa pools.

== Ōpuke Thermal Pools ==
In 2019, the New Zealand Government's provincial growth fund provided a $7.5 million government loan to help fund a new hot pools and spa complex that was built next to the Methven Trotting Club. It has both family bathing and an adults-only area. The water for the pools is sourced from the Rangitata Diversion Race and is heated by an array of around 500 solar thermal collectors. These are backed up by air-source heat pumps when required. The hot pools opened in November 2021 and were described "as money well spent amid challenging times". In November 2022, the complex reported that there had been 100,000 visitors in the first year of operation. The facility also won the NZIA National Award for Commercial Architecture at the 2022 New Zealand Architecture Awards.

== Other sport and recreation ==
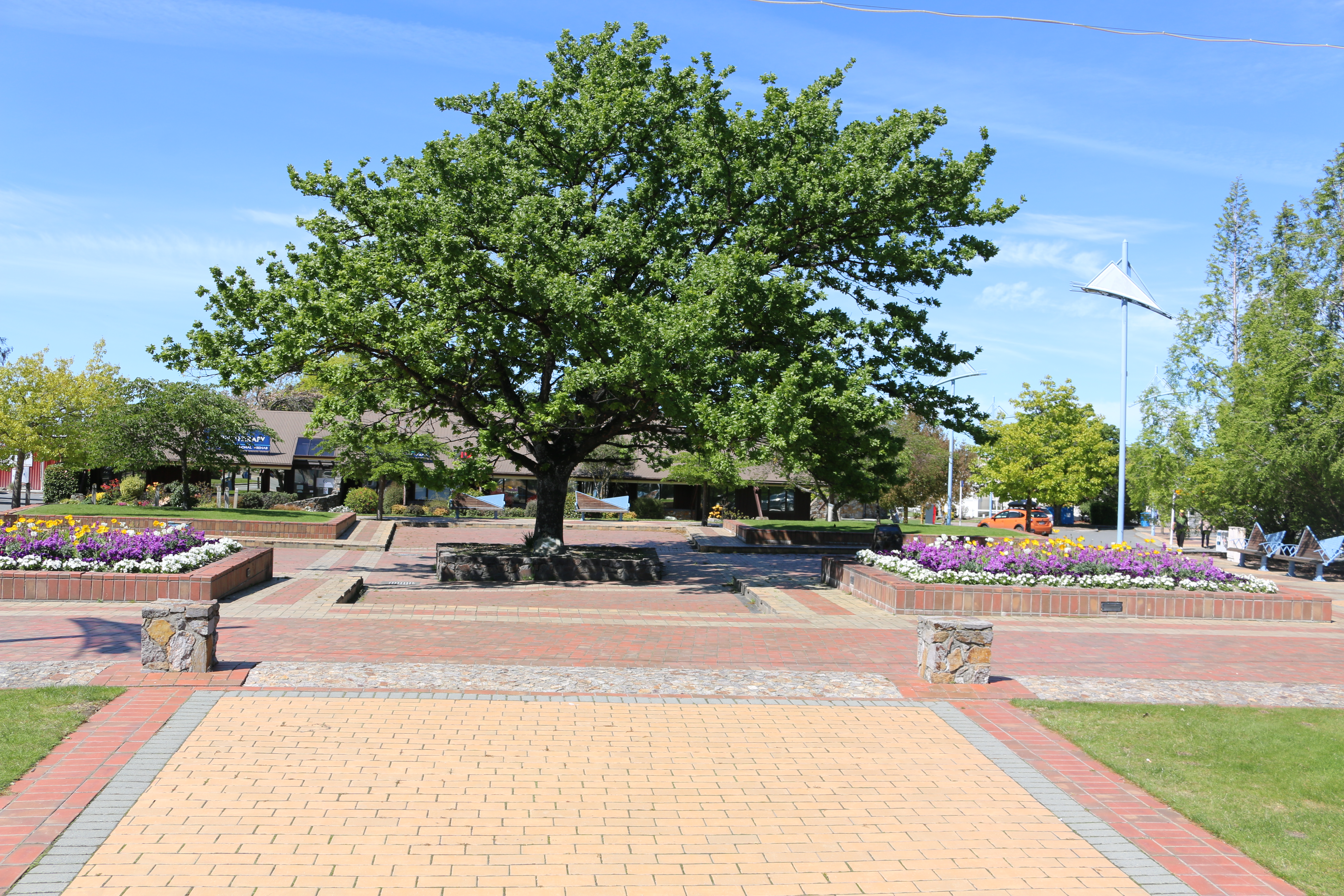
Methven Town Centre (October 2020)

=== Walking and tramping ===
Walking and tramping in the hills and mountains surrounding Methven is a popular recreation.

The Methven Walkway is eleven kilometres long and a gentle walk on the flat. Most of the walk is along the Rangitata Diversion Race. The start of the Rakaia Gorge Walkway is an 11-kilometre drive from Methven. The track is 10.4 kilometres there and back and will take the average walker three to four hours to complete the return journey. Short walks in the Mount Hutt Forest (12.5 kilometres from Methven) include the Rhododendron Walk, Te Awa Awa Walk, Alder Track, Opuke Track and the Ridge Track. A longer walk is the Pudding Hill Stream (8.25 kilometres, 3 hours one way) and the Scotts Saddle Track (4.5 kilometres, 2 hours one way)

The Mt Alford Conservation Area is a 12.5-kilometre drive from Methven. The Mt Alford Track itself is a 4.6-kilometre-long track that climbs to the summit of Mt Alford (1,171 m). It takes approximately three hours one way. The tracks are closed each year in September and October during lambing season. Slightly further away, Mt Somers can be visited as a day trip, or there are options for a two or three day trip with nights in backcountry huts along the way.

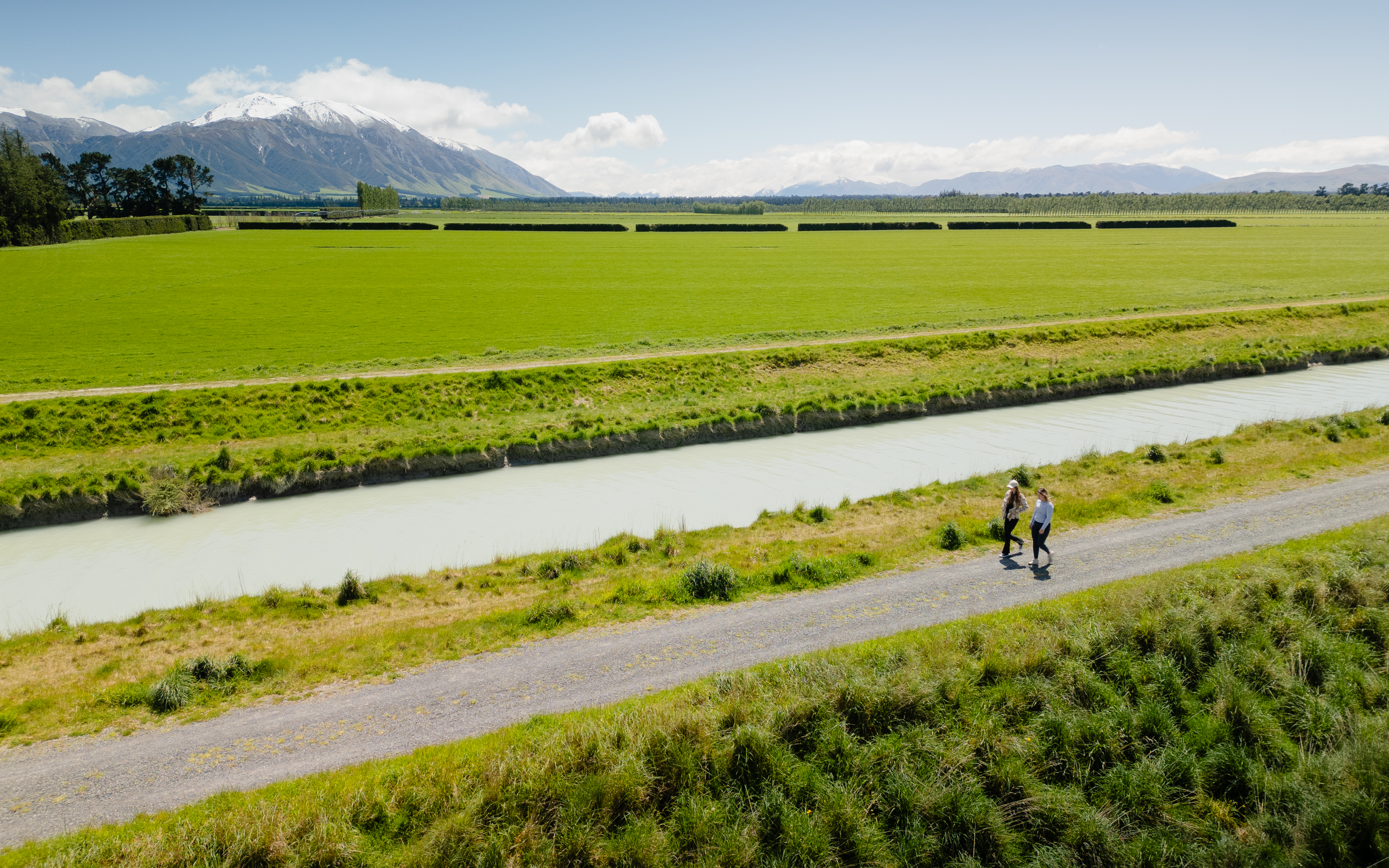
The Methven Walkway alongside the Rangitata Diversion Race, with Mt Hutt in the distance

=== Mountain biking ===
Bike Methven has developed a range of mountain bike trails around Methven which cover cross-country, enduro, and downhill trails. The Mount Hutt Bike Park is home to 30 kilometres of trails that are within five minutes drive from Methven.

=== Skate park ===
The Methven skatepark was opened in 2020. It sits in the centre of town in the reserve at Bank and McMillan Streets. Significant local fundraising efforts were required to make the skatepark a reality.

=== Other activities ===
Horse riding is a popular activity and there are a number of companies that offer horse treks in and around Methven. Hot air ballooning is also available.

== Amenities and attractions ==
=== Methven Rodeo ===
The Methven Rodeo is held annually in October each year and attendances can exceed 6000 people. Events include Barrel Racing, Bull Riding, Saddle Bronc, Steer Wrestling and Team Roping.

== Notable buildings ==
Notable buildings

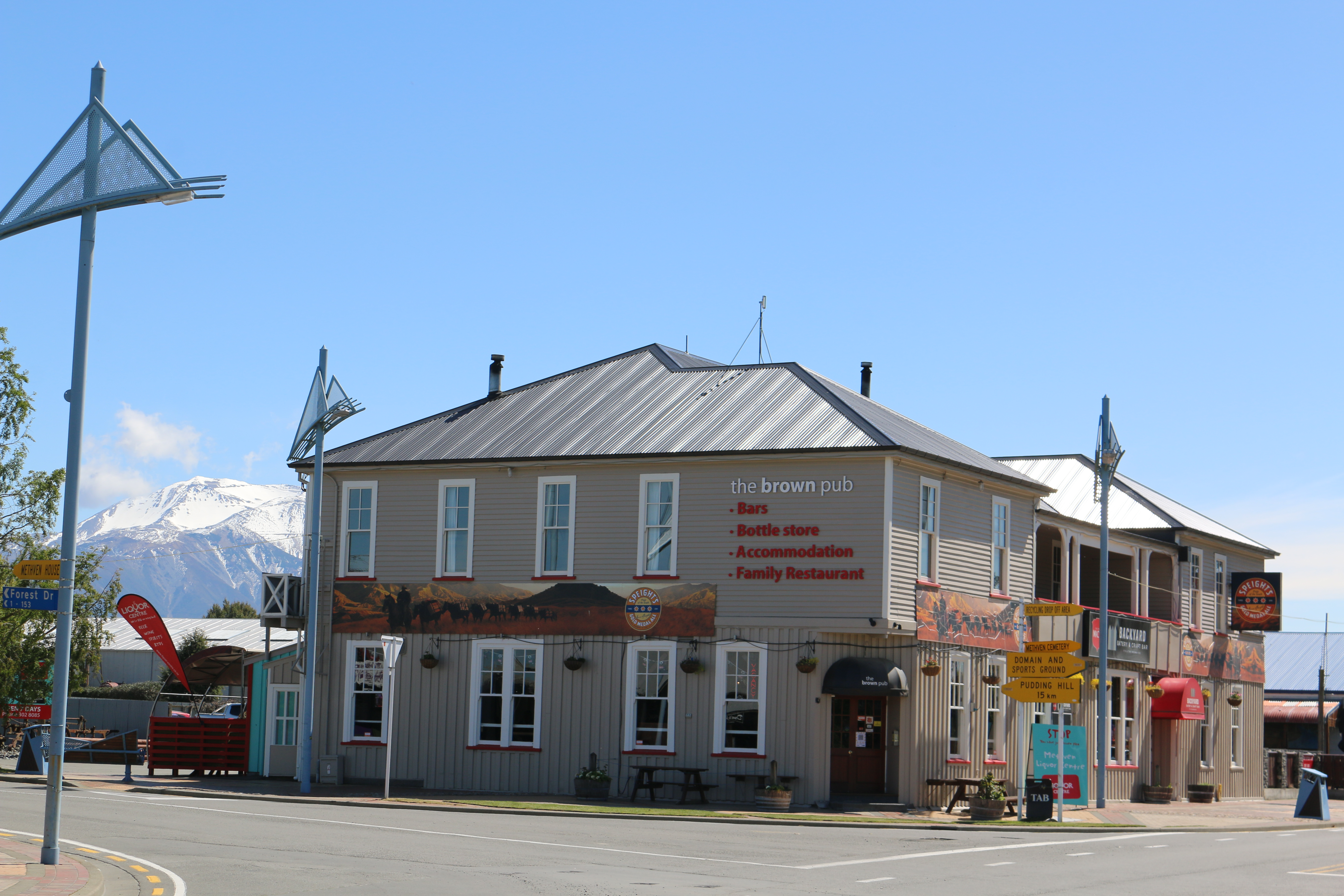
Brown Pub, Methven, Mt Hutt in the background (October 2020)

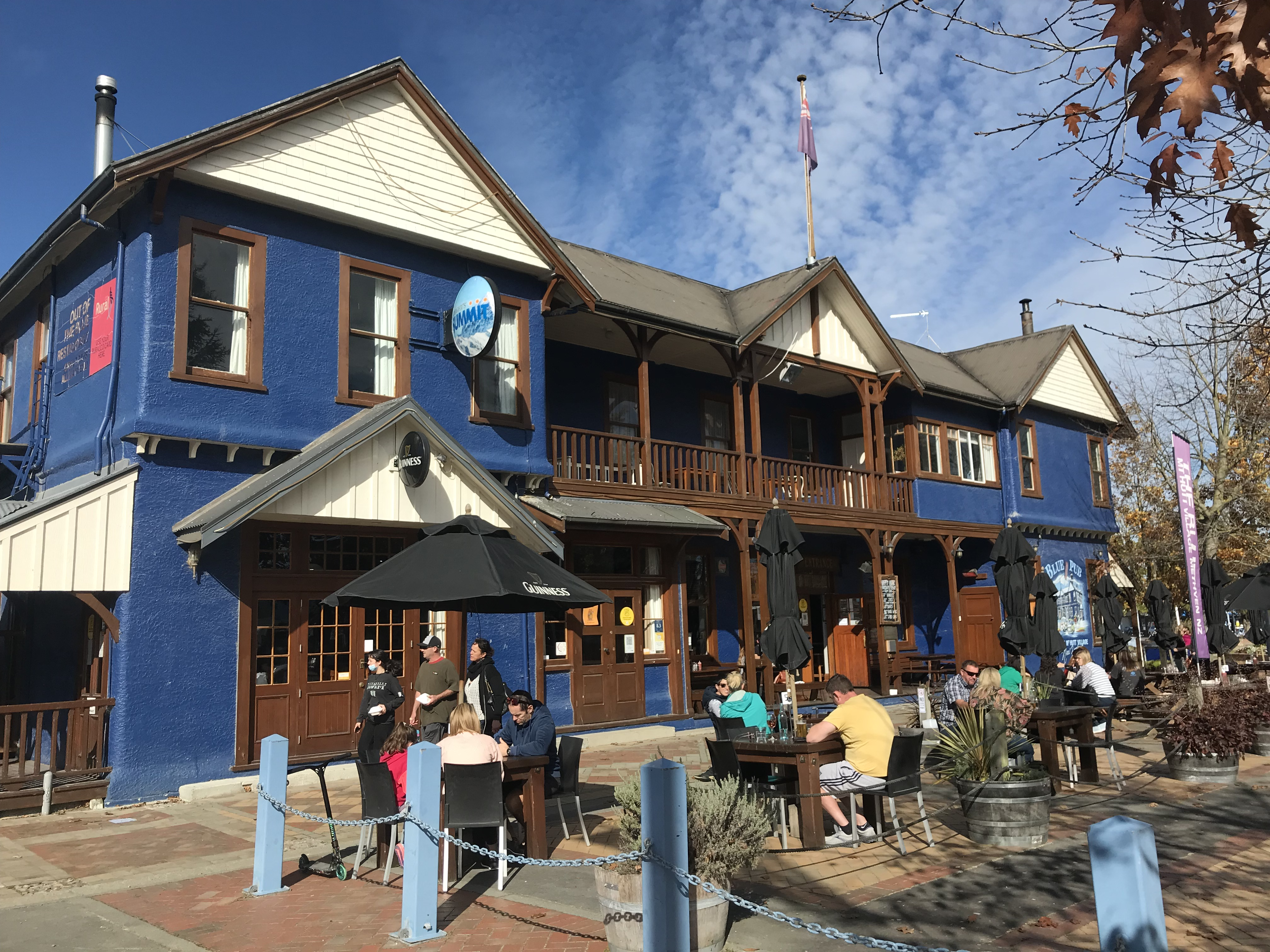
Blue Pub, Methven, (October 2020)

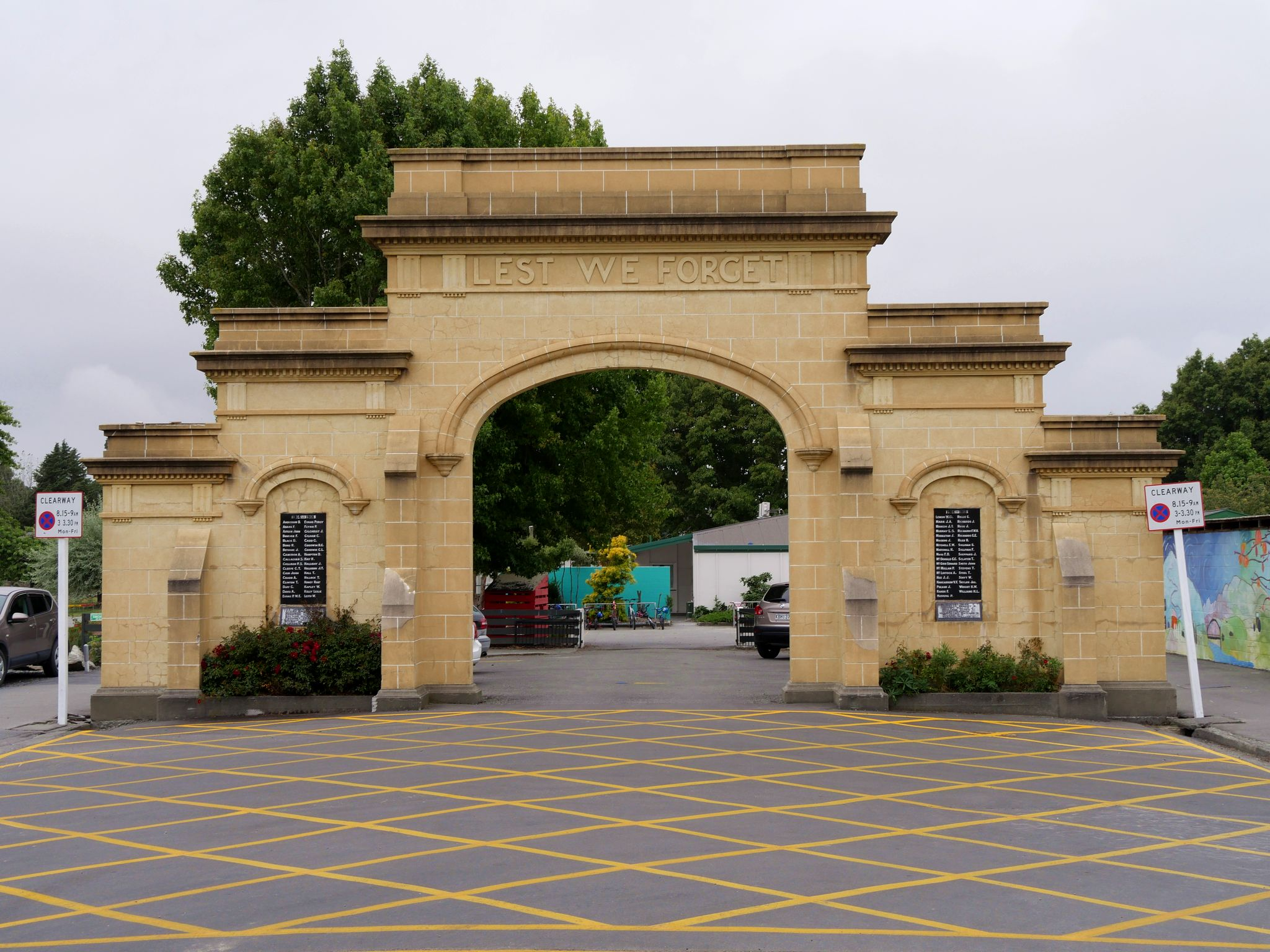
Methven War Memorial

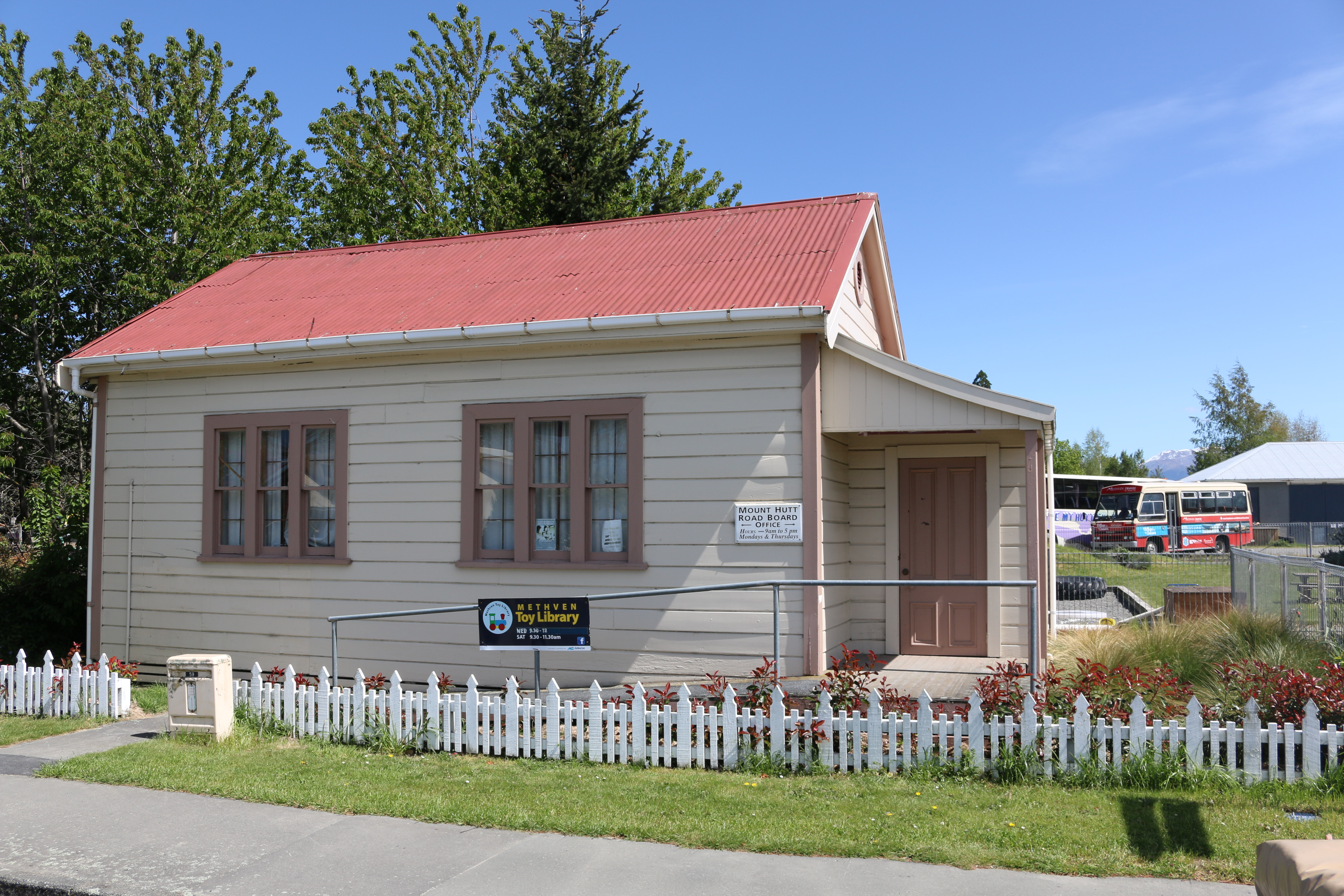
Mount Hutt Road Board Building (October 2020)

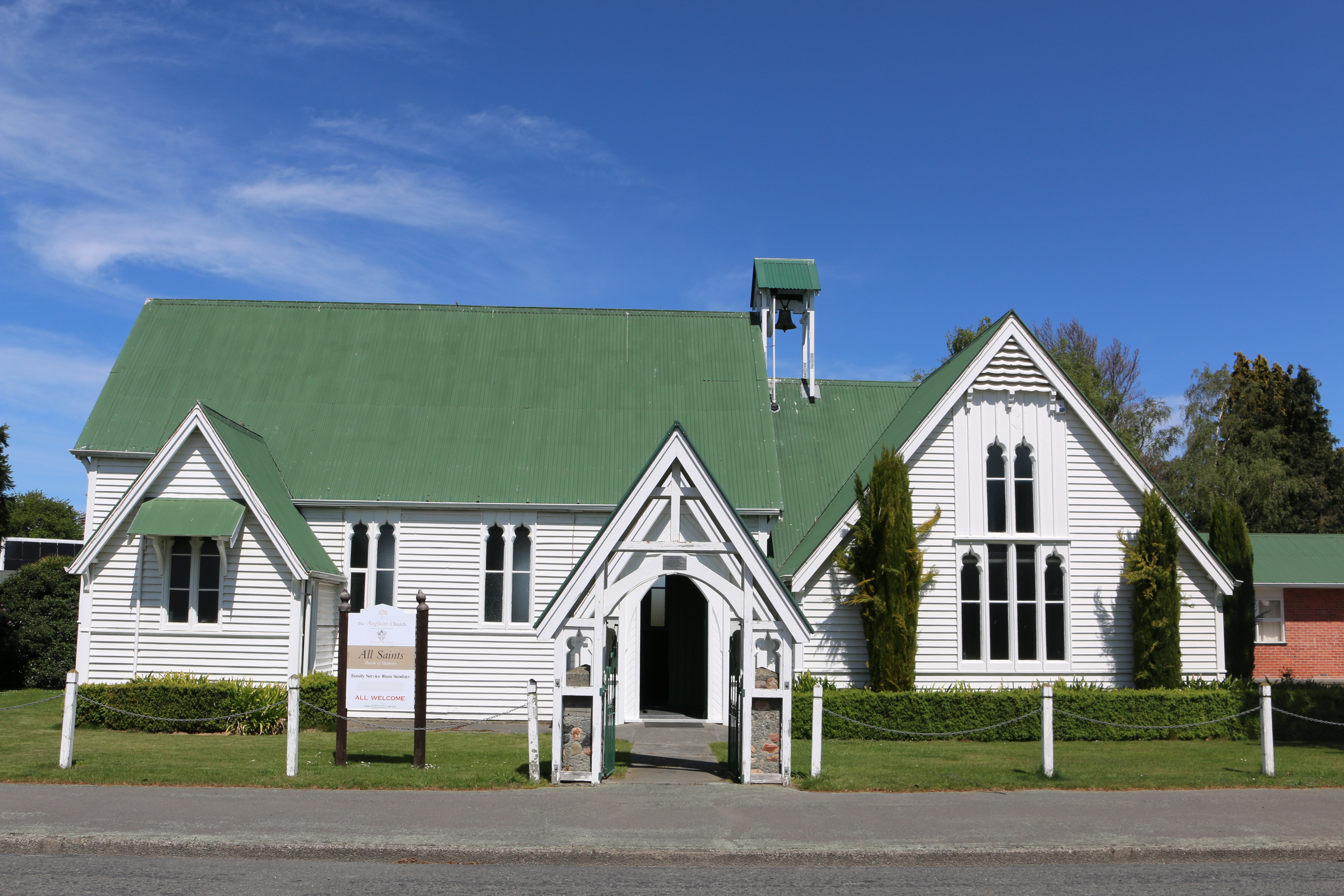
All Saints Church, Methven (October 2020)

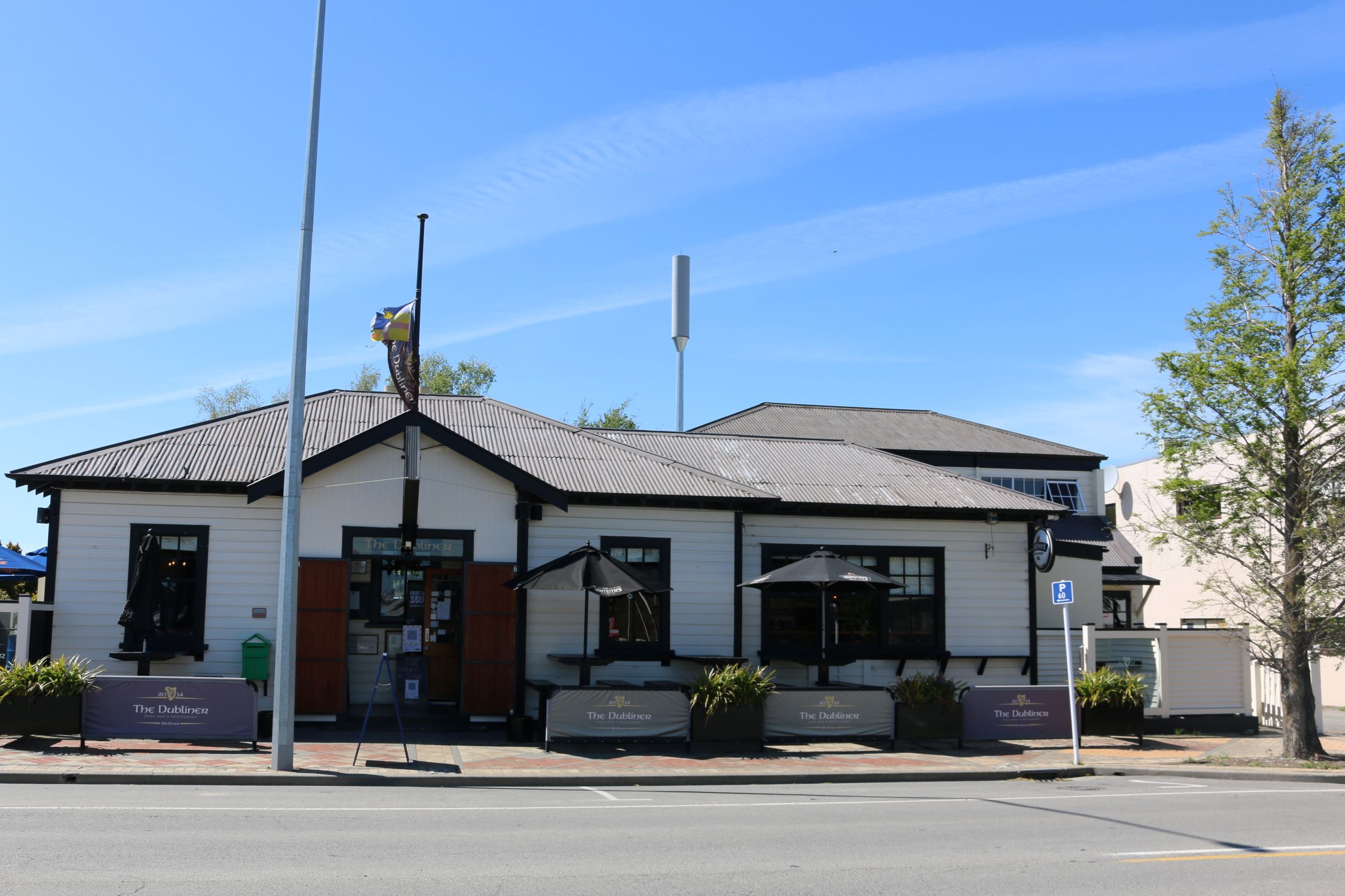
Methven Post Office (October 2020)

The Brown Pub was originally built in 1883 but was destroyed by fire on 19 June 1922 and subsequently rebuilt. It suffered damage in the 2010 Canterbury earthquake and the 2011 Christchurch earthquake, and was damaged by fire in 2019. The Blue Pub was damaged by fire in 1918 and also suffered damage in the Canterbury earthquakes of 2010–11.

The Methven War Memorial was unveiled in February 1930. It commemorates the 69 men lost in the First World War and the 15 men lost in the Second World War.

The Mount Hutt Road Board Building was built in 1879 on Methven's Main Street and is one of the earliest buildings in the town. The building was classified as a Category 2 historic place and registered on the New Zealand Heritage List in October 2019. The building currently serves as the Methven Toy Library.

The All Saints Anglican Church at 1 Chapman Street was built in 1880. The Methven Post Office reopened as an Irish bar and restaurant in 2015. The original bank safe and other historical items still remain in the building.

=== Lost heritage ===
The original Methven Public Library was built between 1883 and 1884 at 60 Main Street, in an Italianate style. It was a category 2 historic place. It was damaged in the Canterbury earthquakes and was demolished in 2013. The Methven Historical Society Building was built in 1917 at 7 Bank Street. It was also a category 2 historic place. It was damaged in the Canterbury earthquakes and demolished in 2013.

== Irrigation canal ==
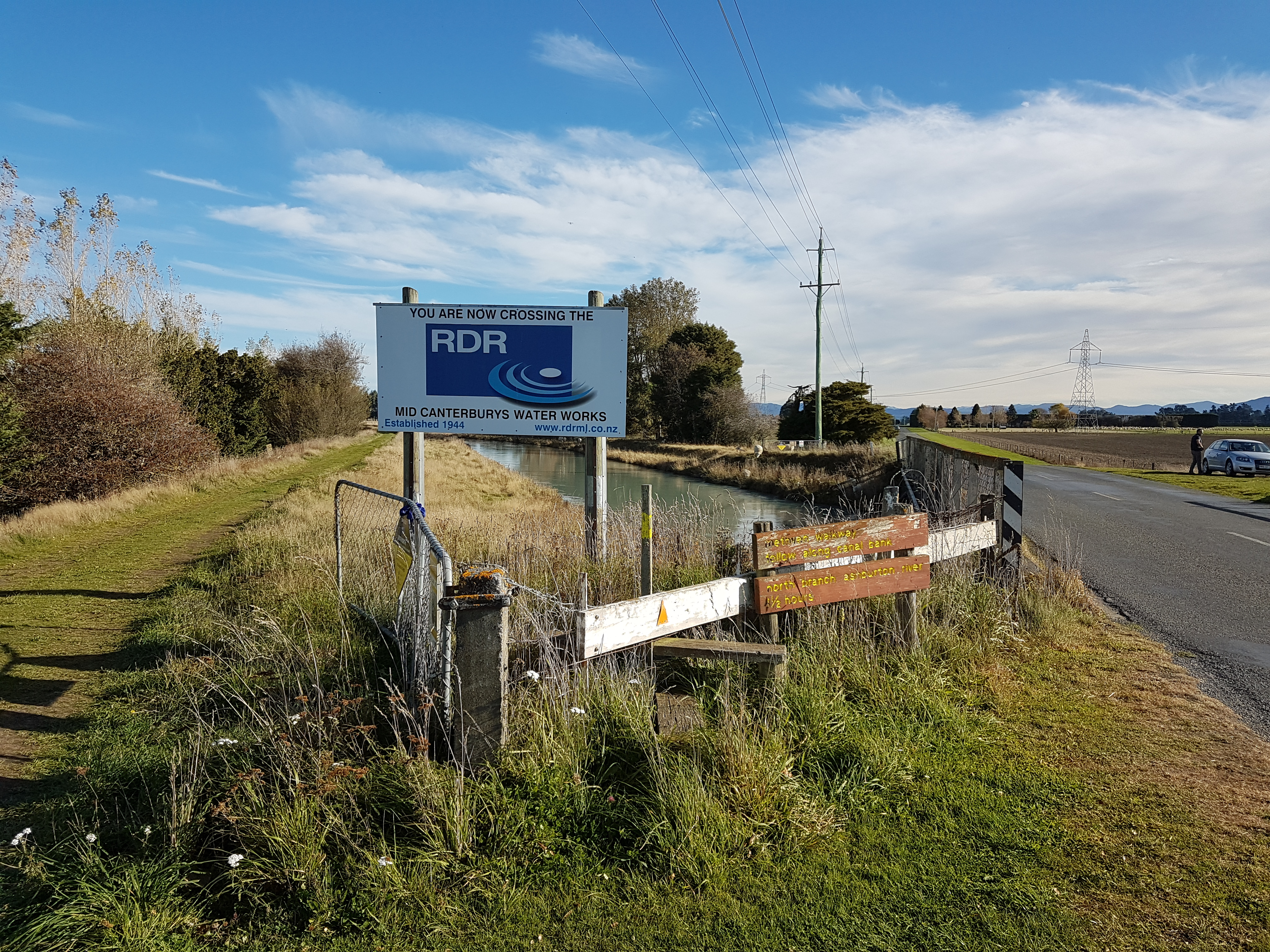
RDR near Methven, looking South

The Rangitata Diversion Race or RDR is a combined irrigation and power generation scheme that diverts water from the Rangitata River to irrigate over 100,000 hectares of farmland in mid-Canterbury. The main canal is 67 km long, and passes immediately to the west and north of Methven township. The RDR project was the first major river diversion in New Zealand, and the largest irrigation scheme in the country. Construction began in 1937, paused for World War 2 and was completed in 1945.

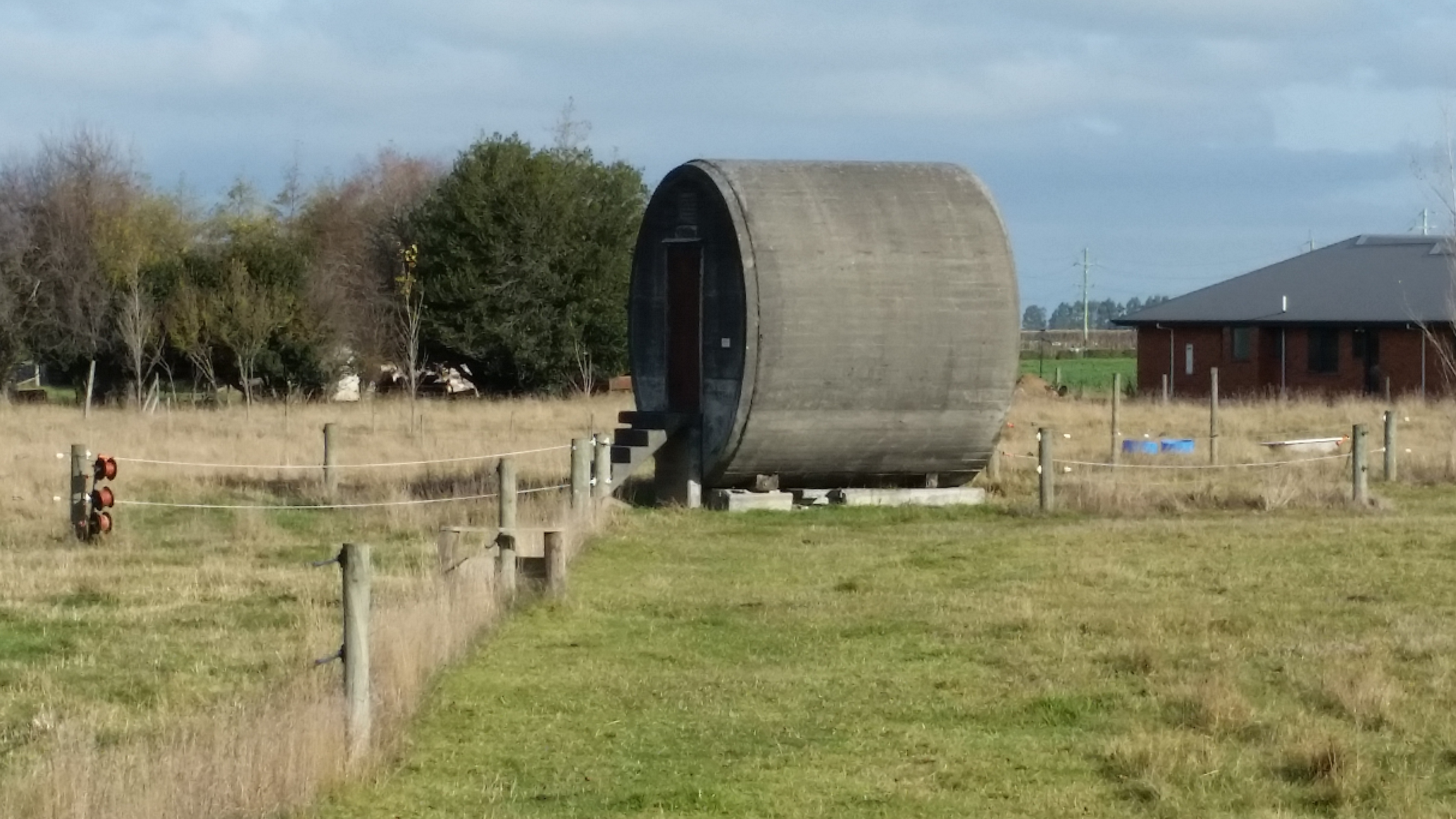
The Pipe Shed (October 2020)

The Pipe Shed is a storage shed for explosives that used one of the 800 pipes manufactured in 1940 for the Rangitata Diversion Race. It is the only structure in Methven rated as Category I by Heritage New Zealand.

== In popular culture ==
Methven also served as a base to cast and crew for the filming of Edoras (located further inland at Mount Sunday), for The Lord of the Rings.

The cast and crew of the movie Z for Zachariah stayed in Methven in February and March 2014 while shooting scenes at Washpen Falls near Windwhistle. After a party at the Blue Pub in Methven, Hollywood actor Chris Pine was caught drink-driving by police.

During the 2020 Covid-19 lockdown in New Zealand, Lynda from the Topp Twins and her wife Donna played music from the back of their truck on the way to the supermarket to bring some fun into peoples lives in Methven.

== Education ==
Methven has three schools.

- Methven Primary School is a state contributing primary (years 1 to 6) school. It has 289 students as of July 2026. There are 25 staff members who work at the school.
- Mount Hutt College is a state Year 7 to 13 secondary school. It has 561 students as of July 2026. Methven School opened in 1882 and added secondary schooling to become Methven District High School in 1925. In 1969, that divided into Methven High School and Methven Primary School. The High School became Mount Hutt College in 1997.
- Our Lady of the Snows School is a state-integrated Catholic full primary (years 1 to 8) school. It has 41 students as of July 2026. It opened in 1912 using two rooms of the convent, and was called Convent School. In 1958 the school moved to two newly built classroooms, and took its current name. It used the old church as an extra classroom once a new church was finished in 1963, and that was replaced by a third classroom in 1980. The school was renovated and extended in 2002. In 1982, it became state integrated.

== Notable people ==
- Graeme Harrison (born 1948), business executive born in Methven and has retired to his birth town
- John Kennedy (1926–1994), journalist born in Methven
- Kathy Lynch (born 1957), competitive cyclist who has retired to Methven
- Lynda Topp of the Topp Twins lives in Methven.

== Notable police dog ==
Methven was home to Rajah, New Zealand's first unofficial police dog. A bronze statue of Rajah sits outside the Mt Hutt Function Centre. It was unveiled on 8 February 2015.
