= Rangitata =

Rangitata may refer to:

- Rangitata (hamlet), a settlement in Canterbury, New Zealand
- Rangitata (New Zealand electorate), a parliamentary electorate in Canterbury, New Zealand
- Rangitata Gorge, South Island, New Zealand
- Rangitata orogeny, a long period of uplift and collision in New Zealand
- Rangitata River, a river in Canterbury, New Zealand
  - Rangitata Island, an island in the Rangitata River delta
    - Rangitata Island Aerodrome, an airfield on Rangitata Island
- Rangitata (spider), a genus of spiders
- RMS Rangitata (1929–1962), an ocean passenger liner
