= Pipe Shed =

Heritage item in Methven, New Zealand

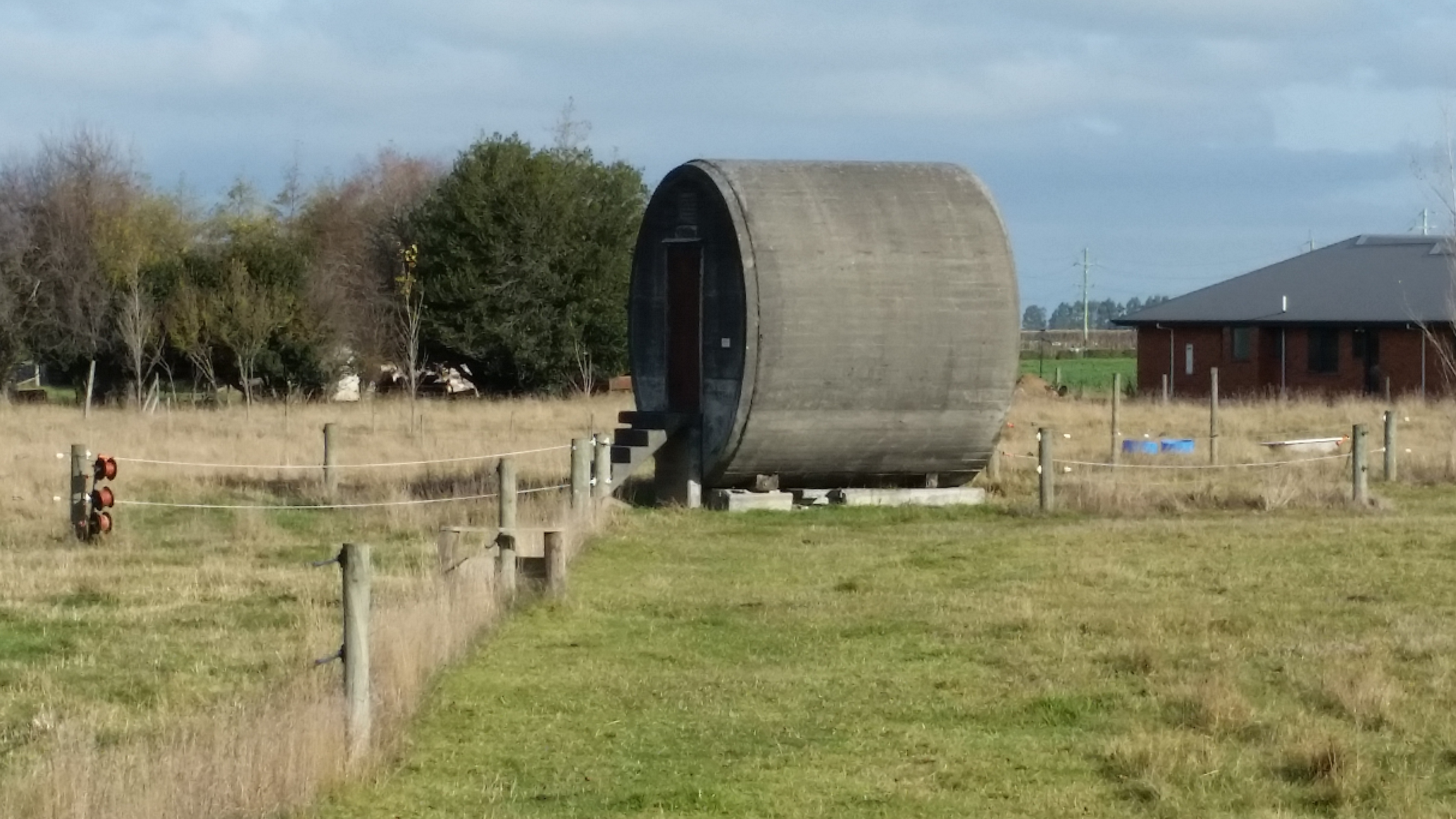
- The Pipe Shed, on the former site of the Methven work camp for the Rangitata Diversion Race

- Location within New Zealand

General information
- Architectural style: concrete pipe
- Location: 59 Main Street (State Highway 77), Methven, New Zealand, New Zealand
- Coordinates: 43°38′13.0″S 171°38′40.5″E
- Completed: 1940

Heritage New Zealand – Category 1
- Designated: 14 April 2005
- Reference no.: 7593

The Pipe Shed in Methven, New Zealand, is a section of pipe cast in 1940 that was converted to a shed for storing explosives. The pipe was one of approximately 800 manufactured for the Rangitata Diversion Race (RDR), and is the only one that remains visible. It serves as a memorial to what was the largest public works project of its time, and is registered as a Category I structure by Heritage New Zealand.

== Rangitata Diversion Race ==
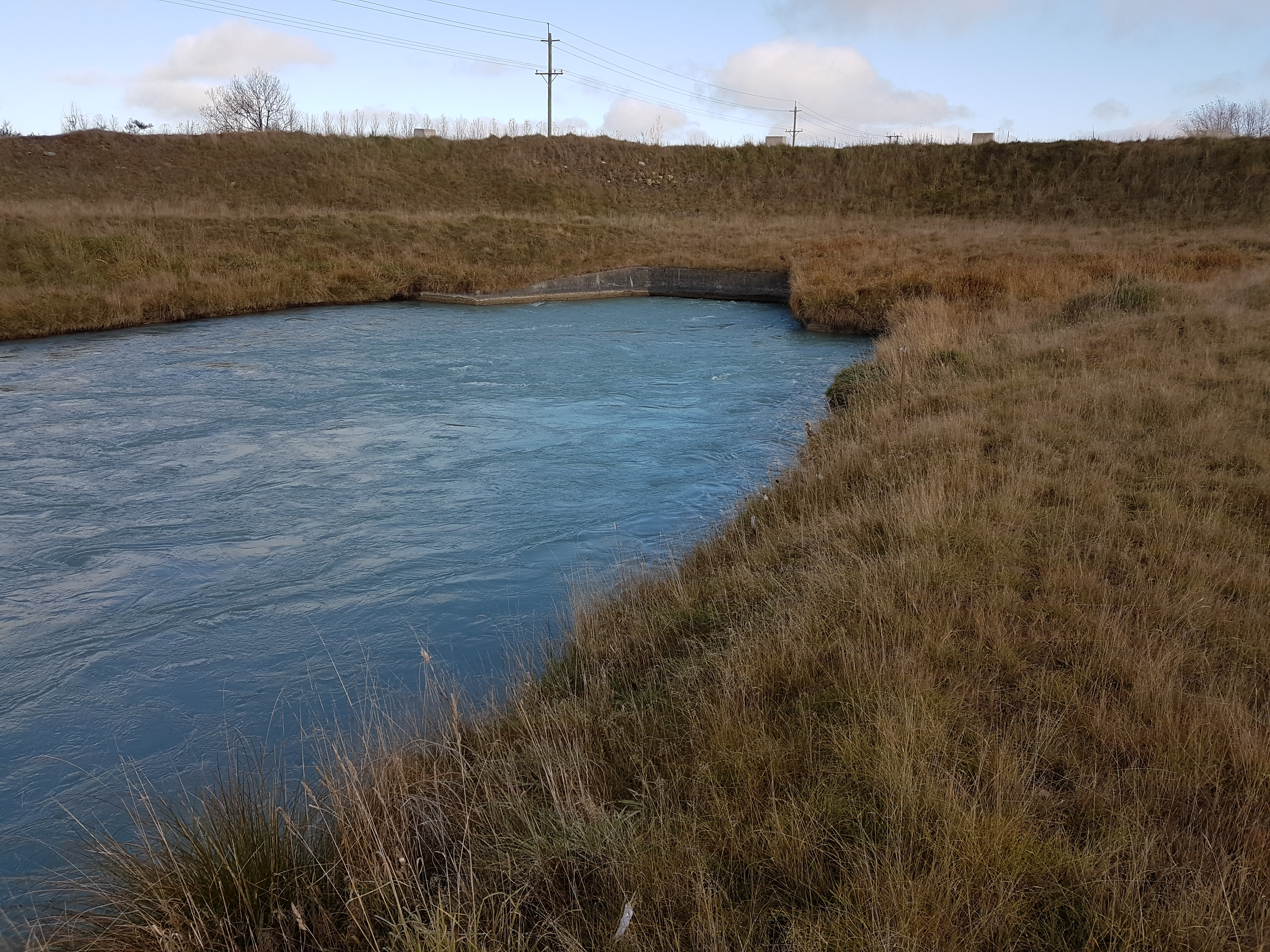
Site of submerged syphon at the South Branch Ashburton River

The Rangitata Diversion Race (RDR) was an irrigation project commenced in 1937 and led by the irrigation engineer Thomas Beck. At the time, it was the largest public works scheme undertaken in New Zealand, replacing several small-scale irrigation schemes. Part of the objective was to create employment, coming out of the Great Depression.

The main canal extends 67 km (42 mi) from the Rangitata River to the Rakaia River. There were several major rivers to cross, and the land near the foot of the Surrey Hills, a range between the two branches of the Hinds River, proved unstable. In 1938, the irrigation canal that had already been constructed was damaged over the summer break by a slip caused by heavy rain. The canal was re-routed away from the foot of the hills and piped, using inverted syphons.

The pipes were manufactured during 1940 at The Birches, a homestead south of Mayfield. Eight were started each day. They were built in two sizes, differing in wall thickness, length, and internal diameter. Those for river syphons had an internal diameter of 11 ft (3.4 m), a length of 3.0 m (10 ft), a wall thickness of 230 mm (9 in), and a weight of 18 t (18,000 kg). The 723 larger pipes had an internal diameter and a length of 3.7 m (12 ft), a wall thickness of 250 mm (10 in), and weighed 28 t (28,000 kg) each. As far as is known, these were the second-largest spun reinforced concrete pipes manufactured in the world up to that time, exceeded only by those used in the United States for irrigation from the Colorado River and the water supply system for Boston.

The minister of public works, Bob Semple, was an enthusiastic supporter of the project and drove his car into the first pipe laid at Surrey Hill.

The Pipe Shed is the only pipe section manufactured for the RDR project that remains visible; all the pipes used in the project are submerged.

== Installation at Methven work camp ==
The Public Works Department established its headquarters for the RDR and a workers' accommodation camp in Methven. In order to store explosives at this site, one of the RDR pipes was installed at the works camp using as a base a pre-cast control gate for the water race. Wooden wedges stop the pipe from rolling. Concrete ends were cast to enclose the open ends, and a wooden door was fitted into one of those; there is a vent in the concrete panel above the door. The pipe is fitted with a wooden floor. It was also used at times to store concrete. The exterior is in good condition apart from a crack in the panel above the vent, but the internal floor has deteriorated, and the door is a replacement.

The Pipe Shed is the only remnant of the work camp. The land is owned by Ashburton District Council and the surrounding area is used for grazing. On three sides, the land is surrounded by roads (Main Street (State Highway 77), South Belt, and the residential cul-de-sac Wayne Place) with the road frontages generally developed. The pipe shed is thus hidden from public view. It is accessible through a gap in bushes and trees from Main Street, or via the Garden Of Harmony, a reserve on South Belt. There was a proposal to relocate the Pipe Shed to a more visible site next to the Mount Hutt Road Board building, Methven's oldest building. That building is adjacent to the work camp and fronts Main Street. In 2025, the Pipe Shed was restored, with the intentions of it being a feature in an extension to the Garden of Harmony, along with the display of a turbine that had been decommissioned from Highbank Power Station.

== Heritage registration ==
The Pipe Shed is a Category I listed historic place, listed on 14 April 2005. Ashburton District Council has the Pipe Shed on its heritage register as item 4 with a Category A listing. The building is unique in several ways: round buildings are unusual, buildings from pre-cast concrete are rare, and it is the only remaining pipe from the RDR that is visible. It is the only reminder of a once busy work camp, and the size of the pipe is a reminder of the technological accomplishment of the RDR.
