= Kathleen Miller =

Kathleen Miller may refer to:

- Kathleen Miller (scientist), climate scientist
- Kathleen Miller (swimmer) (1909–1963), New Zealand swimmer
- Kathleen Miller (actress) (1945–2016), American actress
