= EA Networks =

New Zealand electricity distribution company

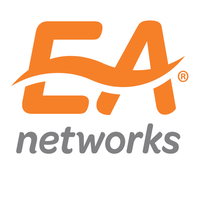
- Company type: Cooperative
- Industry: Electricity distribution
- Predecessor: Ashburton Electric Power Board
- Founded: 1995
- Headquarters: Ashburton, New Zealand
- Area served: Ashburton and surrounding district
- Key people: Ian Cullimore, chair (Shareholders Committee); Gary Leech, chair (Board of Directors); Gordon Guthrie, general manager
- Number of employees: 101
- Website: eanetworks.co.nz

Electricity Ashburton Limited, trading as EA Networks is a co-operatively-owned electricity distribution company, based in Ashburton, New Zealand.

The company was formed as Electricity Ashburton in 1995 after a reorganisation of the Ashburton Electric Power Board into a commercial company. It adopted its current trading name EA Networks in late 2012. It is unique among New Zealand electricity distribution companies in that it is the only company that is a cooperative, whereby shares in the company are owned by electricity consumers connected to its network.

EA Networks owns and operates the subtransmission and distribution network in the Ashburton District (also known as Mid-Canterbury) in the South Island. Outside the Ashburton township (pop. 17,700), most of the district is rural with a high usage of irrigation, with the associated water pumps responsible for more than 85 percent of EA Networks' peak summer demand.

EA Networks also owns a fibre optic cable network interconnecting its zone substations, which also offers broadband internet services to customers along the cable network. It also in a joint venture with Barrhill Chertsey Irrigation regarding an irrigation project covering 133 square kilometres (51 sq mi) of farmland in the north-eastern Ashburton district.

== History ==
Reticulated electricity first arrived in Ashburton in 1908, when private company Craddock & Co established a 220-volt direct current electricity network to supply Ashburton township. The electricity was supplied from a 30 kW generator driven a steam traction engine. A network of 3300-volt and 230/400-volt alternating current lines were later established to supply the township.

In 1921, the Ashburton Electric Power Board (AEPB) was established to operate the distribution network in the Ashburton area, taking over from the private companies and establishing a district-wide network of 6.6 kV and 11 kV distribution lines to replace the DC and 3.3 kV lines. In 1924, the AEPB's network was connected to the national grid and Coleridge Power Station when a 110/11 kV substation was established in central Ashburton. A second connection to the national grid was later established near Methven. After the Second World War, the AEPB established a production facility and reticulation network to supply coal gas to Ashburton township, and was subsequently renamed the Ashburton Electric Power and Gas Board. The coal gas system was disestablished in 1973 when it became uneconomical and the board reverted to its original name.

By the early 1960s, the need for a sub-transmission network became apparent, and in 1967 the AEPB established its first 33 kV subtransmission lines and zone substations, supplied by three 11/33 kV step-up transformers at Ashburton substation. In 1971, the last 6.6 kV lines were converted to 11 kV. As irrigation loads increased and the subtransmission network was extended into the 1980s, two 110/33 kV grid connections were established at Ashburton and Cairnbrae, near Methven, to supply the network. The AEPB also established a 1.8 MW hydroelectric power station at Montalto in 1982.

In the late 1980s and early 1990s, Transpower (then a division of the Electricity Corporation) went about a rationalisation of older transmission lines in the South Island, and as a result dismantled the 110 kV lines between Hororata and Temuka which supplied Ashburton. As a result, a new 220/33 kV grid connection was established in 1992 under the Islington/Bromley to Twizel 220 kV lines at Elgin, 7 km south-east of Ashburton township, to supply the AEPB network in the Ashburton area.

Also in 1992, the Fourth National Government passed the Energy Companies Act, which required electric power boards to be reformed to become commercial power companies. It was decided by the AEPB to become a cooperatively owned company, and in 1995 became Electricity Ashburton Limited. Electricity Ashburton was subsequently responsible for subtransmission, distribution and retailing in the Ashburton District, as well as the Montalto Power Station.

By 1997, the huge increase in irrigation loads were putting a strain on the 33 and 11 kV lines. To alleviate the issue, Electricity Ashburton decided to convert the 33 kV subtransmission network to 66 kV, and to convert the rural 11 kV distribution network to 22 kV (the urban distribution networks in Ashburton and Methven would remain at 11 kV due to the cost of replacing a large network of underground cables). Electricity Ashburton also took the opportunity to connect the Electricity Corporation's 26 MW Highbank hydro power station to its network instead of to Transpower's national grid, and to relinquish the Cairnbrae grid exit point and connect its entire network through the grid exit point at Elgin.

In 1998, the Fourth National Government reformed the electricity sector, requiring electricity companies to split their lines and supply businesses and to sell off one of them. As a result, Electricity Ashburton decided to concentrate on the distribution business, and sold its retail base and the Montalto power station to Tauranga-based generator-retailer TrustPower in April 1999.

Electricity Ashburton has converted the majority of its sub-transmission network to 66 kV, and has converted a significant portion of its rural distribution network to 22 kV.

== Corporate ==
EA Networks is a cooperative company in which company shares are owned by consumers connected to the network. There are 30.07 million shares issued in the company: 28.75 million are owned by the Ashburton District Council in a non-rebate and non-voting form. The remaining 1.28 million are owned by consumers, each owning 100 shares in the company, regardless of how many connections to the network they have or how much electricity they use. Around 99 percent of consumers are also shareholders. Dividends from the shares are paid out in proportion to the amount of line charges each consumer pays.

Each shareholder gets one vote in the election of the Shareholders Committee. The Shareholders Committee is made up of seven members: four elected by the shareholders, and three appointed by the Ashburton District Council; and is responsible for representing the shareholders, monitoring and reporting of the company's performance, and appointing the board of directors. The Board of Directors has five members, and is responsible for the corporate governance of the company.

== Electricity network ==
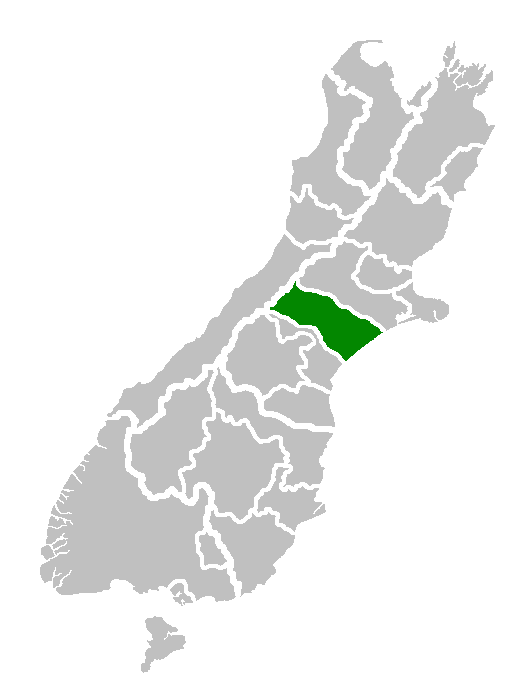
EA Network's service area - the Ashburton District - within the South Island (note the boundaries pictured are of territorial authorities, not distribution companies).

EA Networks' subtransmission and distribution network covers the Ashburton District, a 6,187 km^{2} (2,389 sq mi) area of the South Island, bounded by the Rakaia River in the north, the Rangitata River to the south, and the Pacific Ocean to the east. The area is bound by the Southern Alps in the west, but only three distribution lines extend beyond the foothills of the Southern Alps, all along river gorges. The electricity network consists of 446 km (277 mi) of sub-transmission lines, 2,120 km (1,320 mi) of high voltage distribution lines, and 632 km (393 mi) of low-voltage distribution lines and street light circuits.

There are 17,800 customers connected to the network, the largest of which include a plastics manufacturer (RX Plastics), two meat processing plants (Silver Fern Farms at Fairton and Canterbury Meat Packers at Seafield), a vegetable processing plant (Talley's at Fairton), a skifield (Mount Hutt), and a large water pumping station at Highbank (taking water from the Rakaia River into the Rangitata Diversion irrigation race). There are three major hydroelectric power generators connected to the network - Highbank (26 MW), Montalto (1.8 MW), and Cleardale (1.0 MW). The network is summer-peaking, with peak demand up to 149 MW in summer when irrigation is in use, and up to 62 MW in winter. In the year to 31 March 2012, Electricity Ashburton delivered 576 GWh of to consumers.

EA Networks is supplied electricity from the national grid from Transpower's Ashburton substation, located at Elgin, 7 km south-east of Ashburton (43.94197°S 171.80148°E). Electricity is supplied from the National Grid at two voltages - 33 kV and 66 kV. A 33/66 kV transformer at EA Networks' Elgin zone substation, located next to Transpower's substation, provides a connection between the two supplies.

The 33 kV supply from Elgin is used to supply the entire Ashburton township from the Ashburton zone substation (on the site of the former Transpower 110 kV Ashburton substation) and Northtown substation, as well as three major industrial customers at Fairton and Seafield. The 66 kV supply from Elgin is used to supply the remainder of the district, including the town of Rakaia (from Overdale zone substation) and Methven (from Methven 66kV and Methven 33kV zone substations). At the Methven 66 kV zone substation, electricity is stepped down from 66 kV to 33 kV to supply subtransmission lines to Mount Hutt, and along the foothills to Mount Somers and Montalto.

=== Network statistics ===
Electricity Ashburton network statistics for the year ending 31 March 2024
Parameter	Value
Regulatory asset base	$360 million
Line charge revenue	$47.0 million
Capital expenditure	$16.6 million
Operating expenditure	$15.5 million
Customer connections	21,105
Energy delivered	635 GWh
Peak demand	172 MW
Total line length	3,160 km
Distribution and low-voltage overhead lines	1,970 km
Distribution and low-voltage underground cables	801 km
Subtransmission lines and cables	391 km
Poles	27,118
Distribution transformers	6,568
Zone substation transformers	32
Average interruption duration (SAIDI)	171 minutes
Average interruption frequency (SAIFI)	1.57

=== Network developments ===
Much of EA Networks' work is associated with converting the subtransmission network to 66 kV and the rural distribution network to 22 kV. In 2011, it completed the conversion of Lagmhor zone substation, west of Ashburton, and the Lagmhor to Elgin subtransmission line to 66 kV, thereby completing a second connection to the southern half of its 66 kV network, and in the process decommissioned three old 33 kV zone substations and their associated subtransmission lines.

EA Networks as of 2012 is in the process of converting Northtown zone substation and the Northtown to Elgin subtransmission cable to 66 kV, and building a new line north from Northtown to Fairton and reconfiguring the 66 kV near there to provide a third 66 kV line to the northern half of the 66 kV network. The project was expected to be completed by 2012, but was delayed as the preferred 66 kV line route between Northtown and Fairton along the Main South rail line couldn't be agreed to and EA Networks had to resort to rebuilding an existing 33/11 kV line along State Highway 1 to a 66/33 kV line and install an 11 kV underground cable.

EA Networks is also planning to construct new 66 kV zone substations adjacent to the existing 33 kV Ashburton and Seafield zone substations to secure supply to the distribution network in those areas and prepare for eventual 66 kV conversion. Work is also underway in rebuilding existing 33 kV and rural 11 kV lines to be capable of 66 kV and 22 kV operation for when conversion of those lines occur.

As conversion to 66 kV transmission progresses, the 66 kV supply transformers at Transpower's Ashburton substation are becoming increasingly overloaded. As of 2012, there are two 220/66 kV at the substation with a total nominal capacity of 220 MVA - one 120 MVA transformer and one 100 kV transformer. In summer where load is high and local generation is low due to irrigation (the largest local generator, Highbank, has limited water supply in summer as most of it is being diverted for irrigation), if one transformer is out of service, then the other transformer will overload during peak demand. While electricity can be transferred from the 33 kV network via the 33/66 kV transformer at Elgin, in the future it will not be enough to meet demand. As a result, EA Networksn is in negotiations to install a third 120 MVA 220/66 kV transformer at the Ashburton substation around 2015 to secure supply to the network.

EA Networks is also in negotiations with Transpower about establishing a second 66 kV grid exit point to supply the northern and western half of the network around 2020, to take the load off the existing Ashburton substation. The proposed grid exit point would be located approximately where Transpower's Livingstone to Islington 220 kV transmission line crosses Thompsons Track between Methven and Rakaia (approximately 43.7507°S 171.8460°E), would connect to both the Livingstone to Islington line and the nearby Tekapo B to Islington 220 kV (via a short tie-line), and have two 220/66 kV transformer - one new and one relocated from the Ashburton substation.

Highbank Power Station is embedded within the EA Networks 66 kV system. Power station generators and their step-up transformers are designed to withstand the internal forces that occur when an electrical short circuit fault occurs close to the power station. However, generators and step-up transformers are still vulnerable to severe damage if a network event causes an out-of-phase synchronisation. Highbank Power Station is potentially exposed to a risk of out-of-phase synchronisation resulting from manual or automatic switching on the 66 kV network. To manage this risk, the historic practice of EA Networks has been to avoid the use of automatic reclose on the 66 kV network, and to ensure that the Highbank generator is disconnected before manually closing circuit breakers. These precautions add complexity to network operations and can delay restoration of circuits after a fault. EA Networks plans to install phasor measurement units (or synchrophasors) on their 66 kV network in 2025 to enable automatic re-closing of 66 kV circuit breakers if the conditions for closure are suitable and will not produce an unacceptable out-of-phase synchronisation.
