= Thomas Beck (engineer) =

New Zealand civil engineer

- Born: Thomas George Gordon Beck; 2 August 1900; Palmerston, New Zealand
- Died: 6 January 1948 (aged 47); Wellington, New Zealand
- Education: University of Canterbury
- Occupation: Civil engineer
- Known for: Irrigation schemes
- Notable work: Rangitata Diversion Race

Thomas George Gordon Beck (2 August 1900 – 6 January 1948) was a New Zealand civil engineer who had a leading role in public works engineering projects in New Zealand.

== Early life ==
Beck was born in Palmerston, Otago, in the South Island of New Zealand. He attended primary school at High Street Normal School, Dunedin, and secondary school at the Normal District High School and Otago Boys' High School in Dunedin. Beck passed his university matriculation examinations in 1919. He gained early work experience with the Public Works Department (PWD) as a cadet, and then undertook tertiary studies at the University of Canterbury (known at that time as Canterbury College).

== Career ==
After completing his tertiary studies, Beck took up a role in the Dunedin District office of the PWD. In December 1928, on behalf of the PWD, he took part in an inspection of the Graves-Talbot track, from the head of Lake Wakatipu to Milford Sound, by way of the Hollyford Valley. The purpose of the trip was to ascertain the repairs to the track that would be needed to enable the route to be safely used by tourists.

In 1931, Beck was awarded a Commonwealth Fund fellowship, for eighteen months' study in the United States. He worked for most of this period with the United States Bureau of Reclamation on public works engineering for water resource management projects. He returned to New Zealand in mid 1933. He was then engaged in preliminary surveys and investigation of irrigation projects. By 1936, he was Resident Engineer for the Public Works Department in Temuka.

In December 1936, Beck was publicly acknowledged by the Minister of Public Works (Bob Semple), at the official opening of the Levels Plain irrigation scheme near Timaru.

=== Rangitata diversion race project ===
One of Beck's major projects was the planning, design and construction of a 67-kilometre-long (42 mi) irrigation canal in mid-Canterbury, the Rangitata Diversion Race (RDR), beginning at the Rangitata River, and finishing at the Rakaia River. Work on the scheme started on 2 April 1937 and it was completed in November 1944. Beck was the engineer in charge of the project until 1944.

In 1939, Beck gave an address to the Canterbury branch of the Royal Society of New Zealand, giving details of the initial research and planning for the RDR project, describing its design as a combined irrigation and electricity generation scheme. A large landslide occurred during the construction of the irrigation canal in the Surrey Hills area, in the period December 1938 to January 1939. It was reported that Beck telephoned the Minister of Public Works (Semple), and assured him that despite the difficulties caused by the slip, the water race would be completed.

The solution used sections of large diameter concrete pipe to create an underground syphon, carrying the water race through the unstable area. Beck was responsible for the overall design for the Surrey Hills syphon and the plant used to manufacture the concrete sections. The pipeline was 1.5 miles (2.4 km) long and required 723 pipe sections, 12 feet (3.7 m) in diameter and 12 feet (3.7 m) in length, with a shell thickness of 12 inches (300 mm) and weighing 62,000 pounds (28 tonnes) each. During a visit to the site on 19 October 1940 while construction was taking place, Semple had a photograph taken of himself and his ministerial car inside one of the large pipe sections. At the time of its construction, the Surrey Hills syphon was the largest pipe project outside the United States.

One of the large concrete pipe sections was mounted on a plinth in Methven, at the site of the workers accommodation camp for the RDR project. The pipe section was converted into a shed, and the Pipe Shed is now listed as Category I structure by Heritage New Zealand.

In April 1940, Beck was appointed to the position of district public works engineer in Christchurch, succeeding Fritz Langbein who had been promoted.

=== The Bob Semple tank ===
Beck became involved in a controversial project in 1941, working with Bob Semple to create a locally-built armoured fighting vehicle for military purposes. This became known as the Bob Semple tank. Three of these vehicles were built, with an improvised approach, using crawler tractors as the base. In responding to criticism, Bob Semple defended the initiative and commended the work of Beck and his team, saying:

That tank was an 'honest to God' attempt to do something with the material at our disposal, when raiders were at our back door. Instead of sitting down and moaning, we felt we ought to do something to manufacture weapons that would help to defend our country and our people.

=== Transfer to Wellington ===
Beck was transferred to Wellington in 1942, and was later promoted to Assistant Engineer-in-Chief of the PWD. In February 1946, as part of a re-organisation of the Public Works Department, Beck was appointed as Assistant Commissioner of Works, and Engineer-in-Chief. During this time he was also Chair of the Soil Conservation and Rivers Control Council, and Chair of the Main Highways Board. He was appointed as Deputy Commissioner of Works in 1946.

Beck was a member of the Council of the New Zealand Institution of Engineers from 1944 to 1946.

== Death and legacy ==
Beck died in Wellington on 6 January 1948, after a long illness. The Minister of Works, Bob Semple, paid tribute to Beck, saying:

He was not only a competent engineer, but possessed an inventive mind. ... He was a genius and there are examples of his engineering genius all over the country. He needs no monument. He has erected them with his skill all over New Zealand.
