= Kay Mills =

Kay Mills may refer to:

- Kay Mills (writer) (1941–2011), journalist and author
- Kathleen Mills (1923–1996), Irish camogie player

== See also ==
- Kay Mills Cup
- Katy Mills, an outlet shopping mall in Katy, Texas
- Kay Miller
