= High Street School, Dunedin =

High Street School
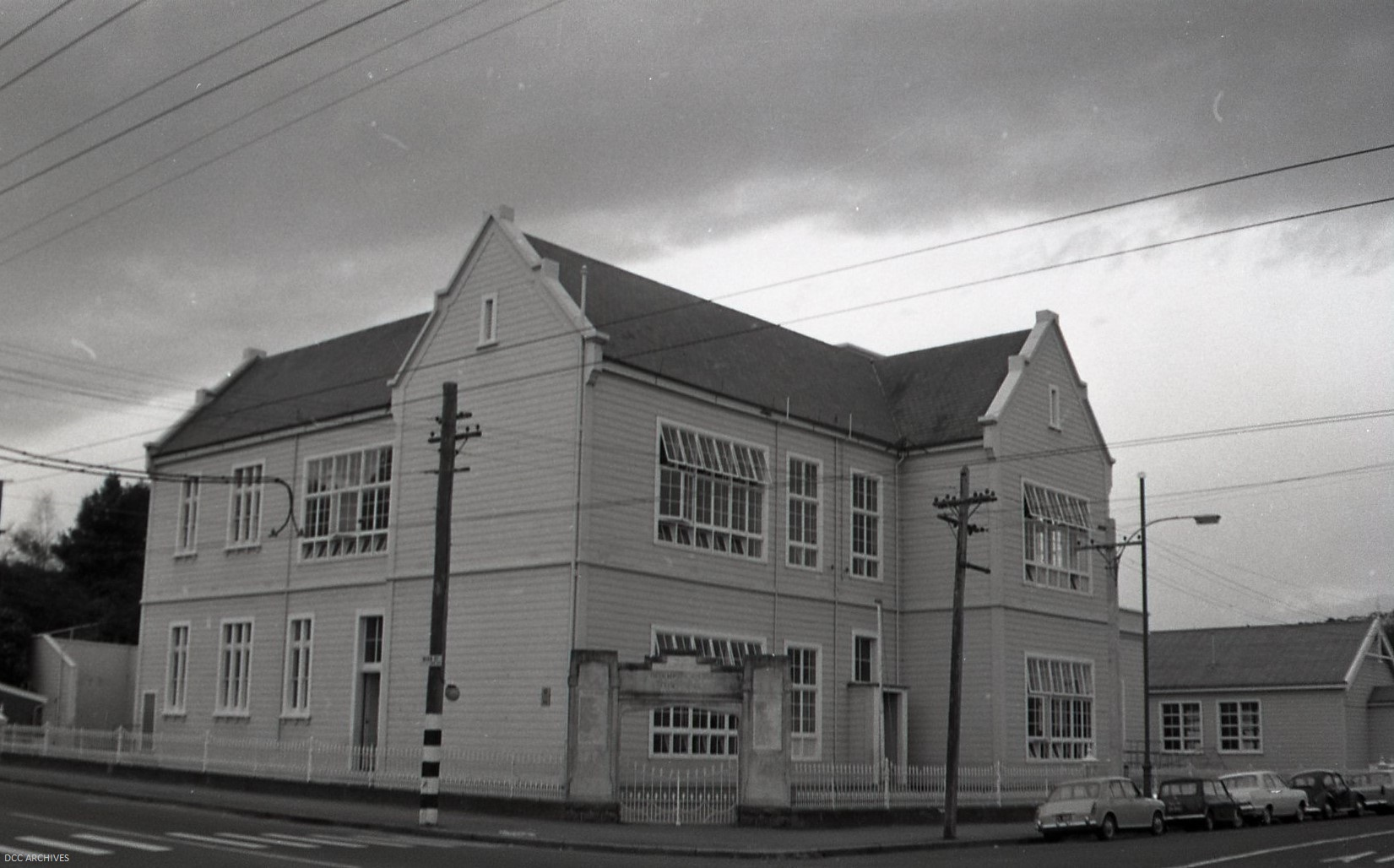

Location
- 7 Montpellier Street, Dunedin, New Zealand; 45.8815°S 170.4877°E

Information
- Type: State, Co-educational, Primary
- Established: 1887
- Ministry of Education Institution no.: 3750

High Street School was a primary school bounded by High, Alva, Montpellier Streets and Queens Drive in the central suburb of Mornington, in the southern city of Dunedin, New Zealand. The school closed in 2011.

== History ==
High Street School was originally established in 1887 as the successor to Dunedin's then South District School which was located at 2 William Street in a building designed by prominent 19th century Dunedin architect Robert Lawson in 1863. That school opened in 1864, and was also known as "Park's School", after the headmaster John Brown Park. The original building (still in existence, as a private residence) was quickly outgrown despite the addition of an "infant" school next door, and was transferred to the nearby, new and larger High Street School in 1887. The first principal of the new school was Mr Park (he died 4 years later in November 1891).

The original High Street School building which opened on Tuesday, 15 February 1887, was a very large and imposing two story wooden weatherboard design with tall 5 metre studs and a prominent bell tower – this building stood for 95 years until 1982 when it was demolished, and replaced by the current school buildings. There was no separate intermediate school for some years and the combined primary and intermediate roll was large, numbering around 500 for example in 1924. The janitor and his family lived in a cottage on the grounds and in addition to janitorial duties ran a small shop selling stationery and sweets.

The school had a roll of 106 pupils in 2006 and it declined steadily until it had 21 by December 2010. No pupils returned for the 2011 academic year and the school was officially closed on 28 February 2011.

== Notable students ==
- Thomas Beck (1900–1948), irrigation engineer
- Kathleen Miller (1909–1963), Olympic swimmer
