= Rangitata Diversion Race =

Irrigation scheme in Canterbury, New Zealand

Coordinates: 43.76406°S 171.23423°E

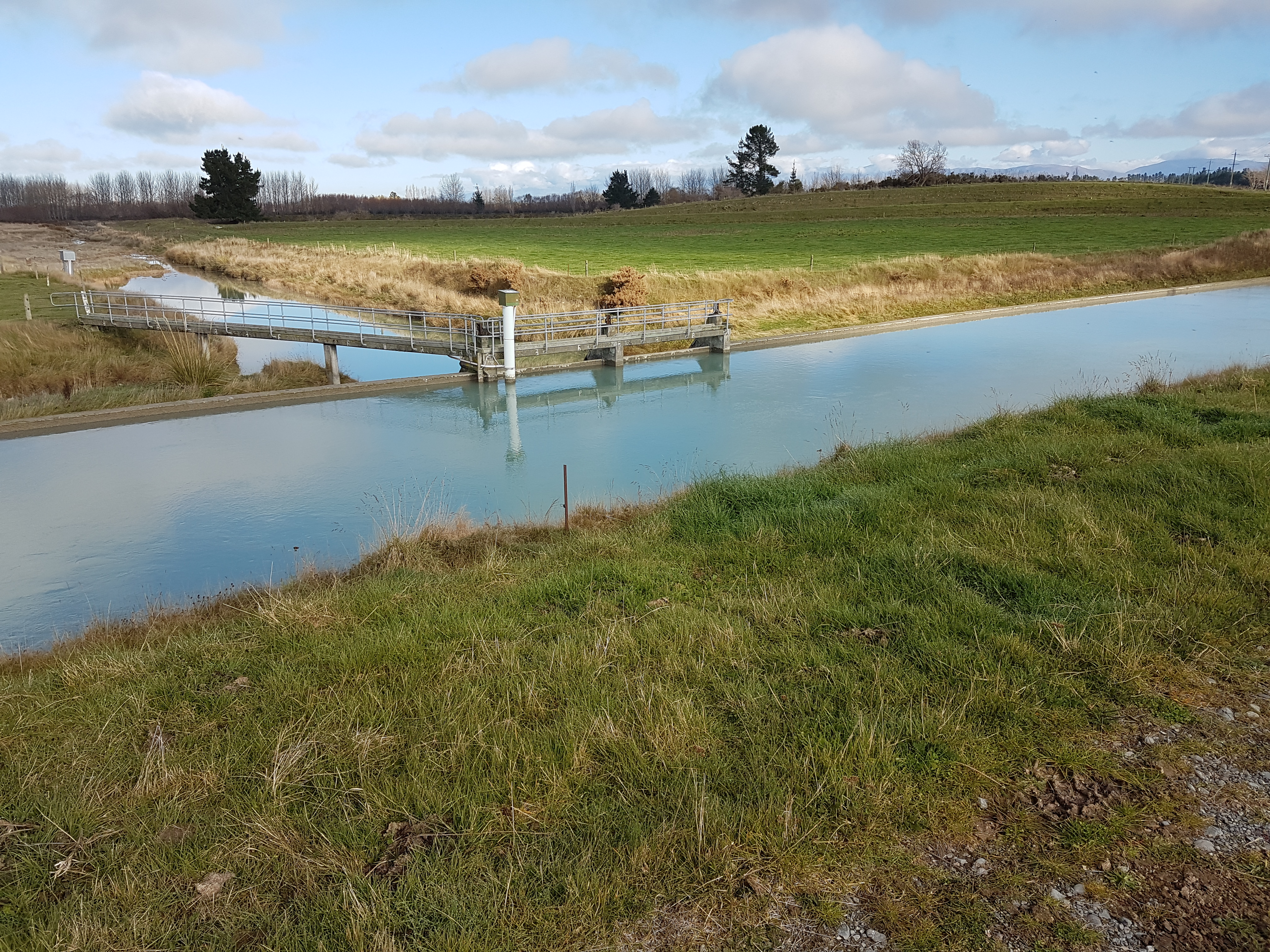
- RDR at South Branch of Ashburton River - overflow channel
- Interactive map of Rangitata Diversion Race
- Location: Mid Canterbury
- Country: New Zealand

Specifications
- Length: 67 km (42 miles)

History
- Current owner: Rangitata Diversion Race Management Limited
- Original owner: Public Works Department
- Principal engineer: Thomas Beck
- Construction began: 2 April 1937
- Date of first use: 8 June 1944
- Date completed: November 1944

Geography
- Start point: Klondyke
- End point: Highbank

The Rangitata Diversion Race or RDR is a combined irrigation and power generation scheme that diverts water from the Rangitata River to irrigate over 75,000 ha (190,000 acres) of farmland in mid-Canterbury, in the South Island of New Zealand. The RDR project was the first major river diversion in New Zealand, and the largest irrigation scheme in the country. It was originally constructed by the Public Works Department between 1937 and 1944. The main canal is 67 km (42 mi) long, 10 m (33 ft) wide and 3 m (9.8 ft) deep.

The RDR supplies three community irrigation schemes, two hydroelectric power stations, the Ashburton District Council stockwater race system and various private stockwater and irrigation schemes.

== The route ==
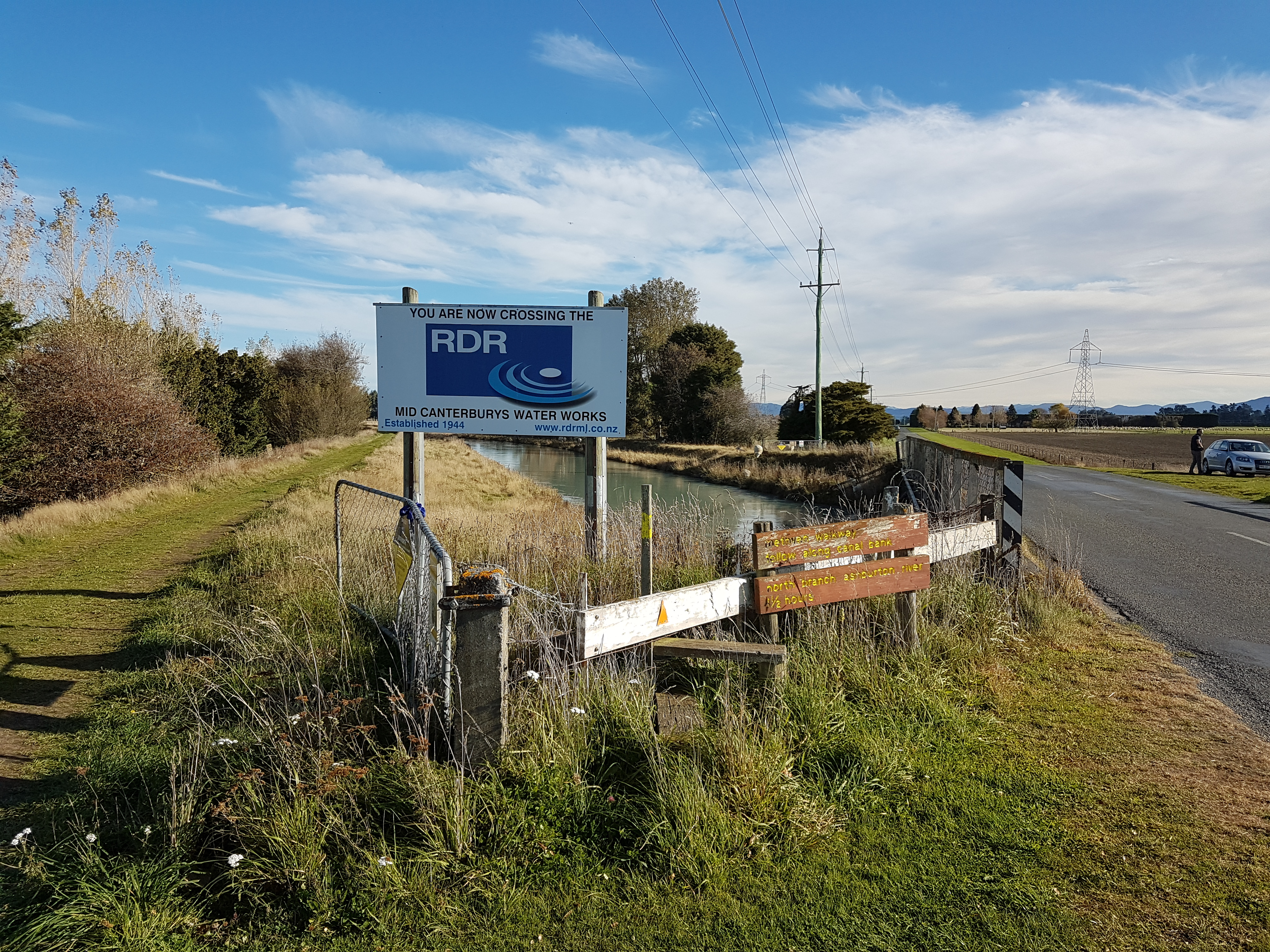
RDR near Methven, looking South

Water is diverted into the RDR canal from the Rangitata River at Klondyke, near the Rangitata Gorge. From Klondyke, the 67 km (42 mi) long route of the RDR follows along the foothills above the Canterbury Plains and passes under several major rivers on the way to the end point at Highbank, above the Rakaia River. The main water intake for the RDR is from the Rangitata River, but there is also an intake from the South Ashburton River at Mt Somers. The average fall of the race is 19 centimetres per kilometre (1.0 ft/mi).

An 11 km (6.8 mi) long walkway and mountain biking trail was established near Methven in 1979, mostly along the stopbanks of the RDR.

== Ownership and management ==
The RDR scheme was originally developed and operated by the Public Works Department and its successors. On 1 October 1990, the scheme was transferred from the Crown to local interests. Since that time, the RDR has been owned and managed by Rangitata Diversion Race Management Limited (RDRML), a user-owned limited liability company. As at May 2020, the shareholders are:

- Ashburton District Council (40%)
- MHV Water Limited (30%)
- Ashburton Lyndhurst Irrigation Limited (15%)
- Trustpower Limited (15%)

Two formerly separate irrigation companies (Mayfield Hinds Irrigation Ltd and Valetta Irrigation Ltd) merged on 1 June 2017 to form MHV Water Limited.

== Water abstraction and resource consents ==
=== Water Conservation Order 2006 ===
In 1999, the New Zealand Fish and Game Council and Central South Island Fish and Game Council made an application under the Resource Management Act 1991 for a water conservation order for the Rangitata River and its tributaries and shallow groundwater reserves. Following hearings by the Environment Court, the Water Conservation Order was eventually made on 19 June 2006. The Order provides a wide range of protections for the river, but does not prevent the renewal of resource consents for the Rangitata Diversion Race, under terms similar to those in force on the date when the Order was made.

=== Resource consents ===
The amount of water that may be taken by the RDR scheme is governed by resource consents issued by Environment Canterbury to Rangitata Diversion Race Management Limited. The operation and maintenance of the scheme requires RDRML to comply with a significant number of individual resource consents and their associated conditions.

The main resource consent (CRC182542) for the diversion of water from the Rangitata River was renewed on 14 August 2018 for a period of 24 years (expires 31 January 2042). The consent conditions allow for a maximum diversion from the Rangitata river of 30.7 cumecs. The conditions include restrictions on the water abstraction, and provisions for maintaining minimum residual flows in the river. The maximum permitted rates of water abstraction are greater during the period between 1 June and 31 August each year.

A separate resource consent (CRC011245) applies to the diversion of water from the South Branch of the Ashburton River/Hakatere – with a maximum continuous take of 7.1 cumecs. However, the main consent condition (CRC182542) limits the maximum combined take from the Rangitata and South Ashburton rivers to 35.4 cumecs.

== Irrigation offtakes ==
The total area irrigated is 75,000 ha (190,000 acres) with a further 20,000 ha (49,000 acres) consented.

The maximum volumes and rates of flow of water that may be taken from the Rangitata Diversion Race are specified in section 15 of the Irrigation Schemes Act 1990. During any season beginning on 10 September and ending on 9 May in the following year, the maximum volume offtake and flow rates for the three main irrigation schemes supplied from the RDR are:

Scheme	Maximum volume million m^{3}	Maximum flow rate cumecs
Mayfield Hinds	320	16.5
Valetta	85	4.4
Ashburton Lyndhurst	250	13

== Highbank and Montalto power stations ==
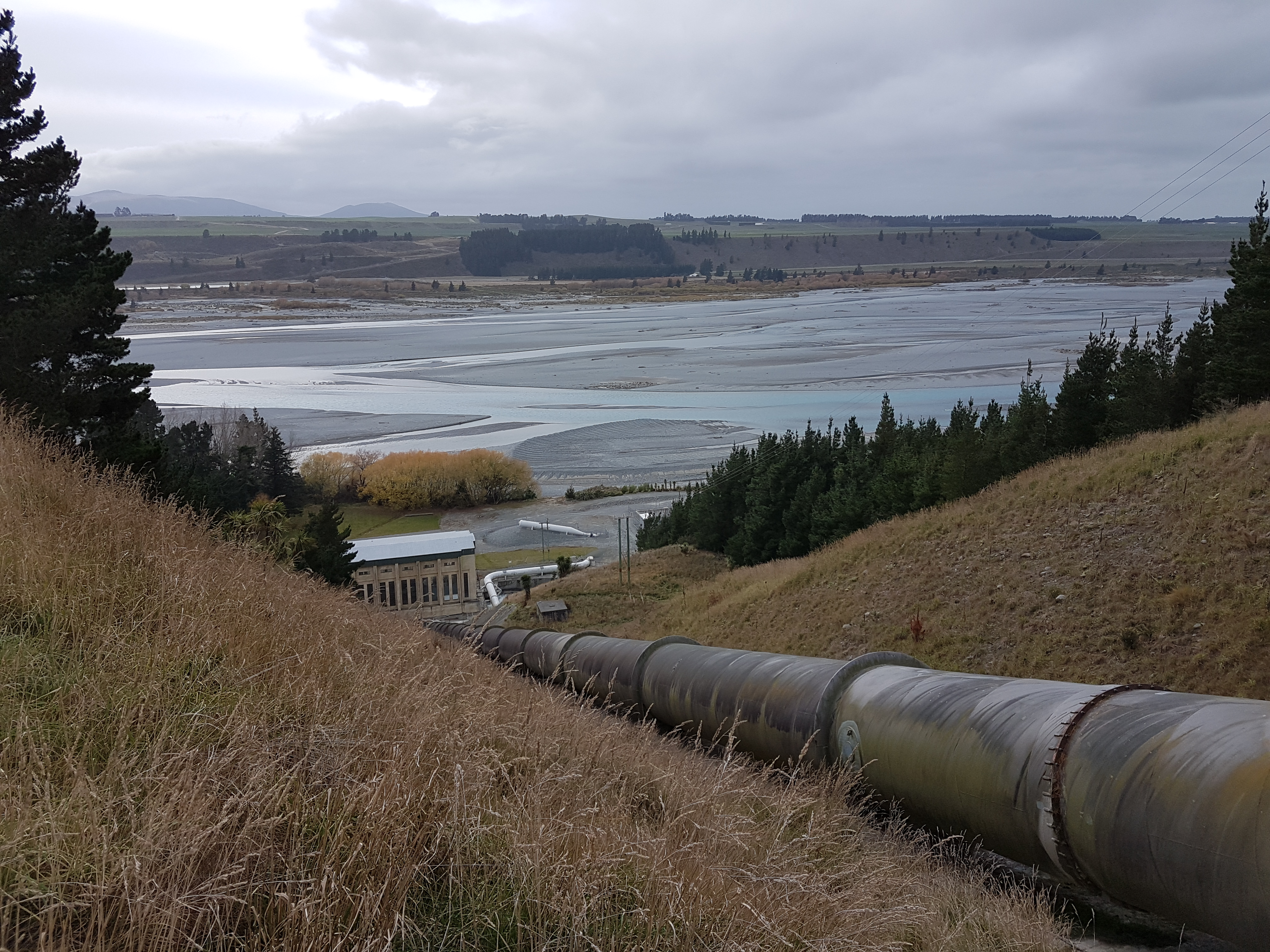
Highbank Power Station, penstock and pump station, looking towards Rakaia River

The RDR scheme was designed as a combined irrigation and power generation scheme. A hydro power station was constructed at Highbank to utilise the 104 m hydrostatic head available from the end point of the canal on the Rakaia river terrace down to the river below. The Highbank Power Station was commissioned in 1945. It has a single turbine and generator with an installed capacity of 28 MW.

The power output available from the station reduced over a long period of time following commissioning, as a result of the gradual accumulation of sand in the canal. Between 1976 and 1979, dredging was carried out to remove the sand, and a sand trap was installed near the intake at Klondyke.

A small power station was commissioned at Montalto in 1982, to utilise the energy available at a point in the route of the canal where there is a 7 m drop in level. The Montalto Power Station has an installed capacity of 1.9 MW.

The combined annual energy generation from the Montalto and Highbank power stations is approximately 94 GWh. The energy generated from the power stations varies depending upon irrigation requirements, but water flow for generation is guaranteed for four months of the year. Generation typically occurs for six to eight months each year.

== Early history and planning ==
The earliest examples of works to bring water to farms in Mid Canterbury date from the 1860s, when run holders started building short water channels from rivers to divert water for their stock and homesteads. The first major water supply system in the region was established by Duncan Cameron, who built 64 km (40 mi) of water races and channels in the Springfield area.

In 1878, when the Ashburton District Council was only in its second year, it was urged to develop a scheme to supply water to Ashburton and the Rakaia Plains. A dam and weir were subsequently constructed at Pudding Hill, north-west of Methven, and by 1882, 640 km (400 mi) of water channels were in use.

These early projects demonstrated the potential for irrigation to substantially increase farm productivity.

In 1896 the Waimakariri-Ashley River / Rakahuri scheme was turned on and by 1927 County Councils ran several lengthy water races, including Rangitata-Orari, 75 mi (121 km); Orari-Waihī , 30 mi (48 km); Woodbury , 25 mi (40 km); Four Peaks (Hae Hae Te Moana), 5 mi (8.0 km); Geraldine Flat and Kakahu-Te Moana, each 15 mi (24 km), and Waitohi, 14 mi (23 km).

The economic depression of the 1930s led to widespread unemployment. This provided a trigger for Government to seek opportunities for public works that would get workers off the unemployment benefit and also raise farm productivity.

The planning and construction of the Rangitata Diversion Race was initiated and managed by the Public Works Department, with Thomas Beck as the lead irrigation engineer. Following initial investigations, the RDR was designed as a combined irrigation and electricity generation scheme.

Work started on the scheme on 2 April 1937, and construction was finished in November 1944. The first electricity generation at Highbank took place on 8 June 1945.

While the RDR was under construction, results from irrigation trials at one property over the 1942–43 season indicated that stock carrying capacity could be increased from 1 sheep per acre to 4 to 6 sheep per acre, demonstrating the farm productivity benefits that the scheme would bring.

== Original construction features ==
=== Manufacturing plant – The Birches ===
A large outdoor manufacturing plant was established at a site called The Birches to construct large diameter pre-cast re-inforced concrete pipeline sections and other major civil structures for the RDR.

=== Waterfall drops ===
The route of the canal had a drop in elevation in the Montalto area that was considerably steeper than the target 1 foot per mile gradient for the canal. The original scheme included three waterfall drops at this point, each of about 2.4 m (7 ft 10 in), to maintain the standard gradient in the canal and prevent scouring. These waterfall drops were removed in the 1980s when Montalto Power Station was built to utilise the energy available from the drop in level of the canal.

=== Syphons ===
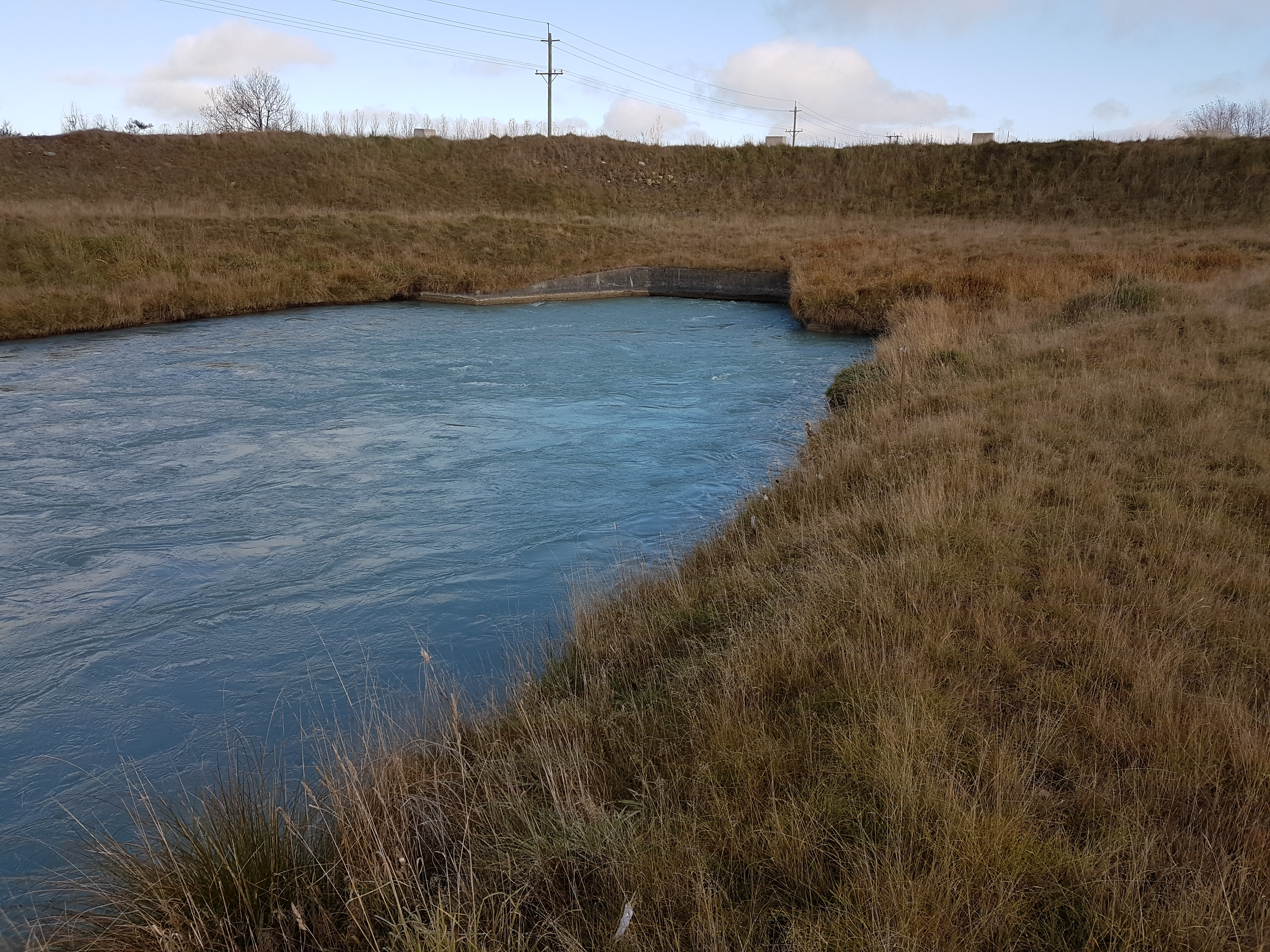
Syphon at South Branch of Ashburton River

The RDR canal passes beneath the North and South branches of the Ashburton River in syphons constructed from large concrete pipe sections.

=== Surrey Hills pipeline ===
The original route plans called for an open canal to skirt the slopes of the Surrey Hills. The canal was built through this area with considerable difficulty because of the boggy and unstable ground conditions. However, in the period between late December 1938 and early January 1939 while most workers were on leave, a large slip seriously damaged the canal works.

The recovery works following the slip required the construction of large concrete pipelines to carry the race in a syphon through the Surrey Hills. During a visit to the site on 19 October 1940 while construction was taking place, the Minister of Public Works, Bob Semple, had a photograph taken of his ministerial car inside one of the large pipe sections.

== The Pipe Shed ==
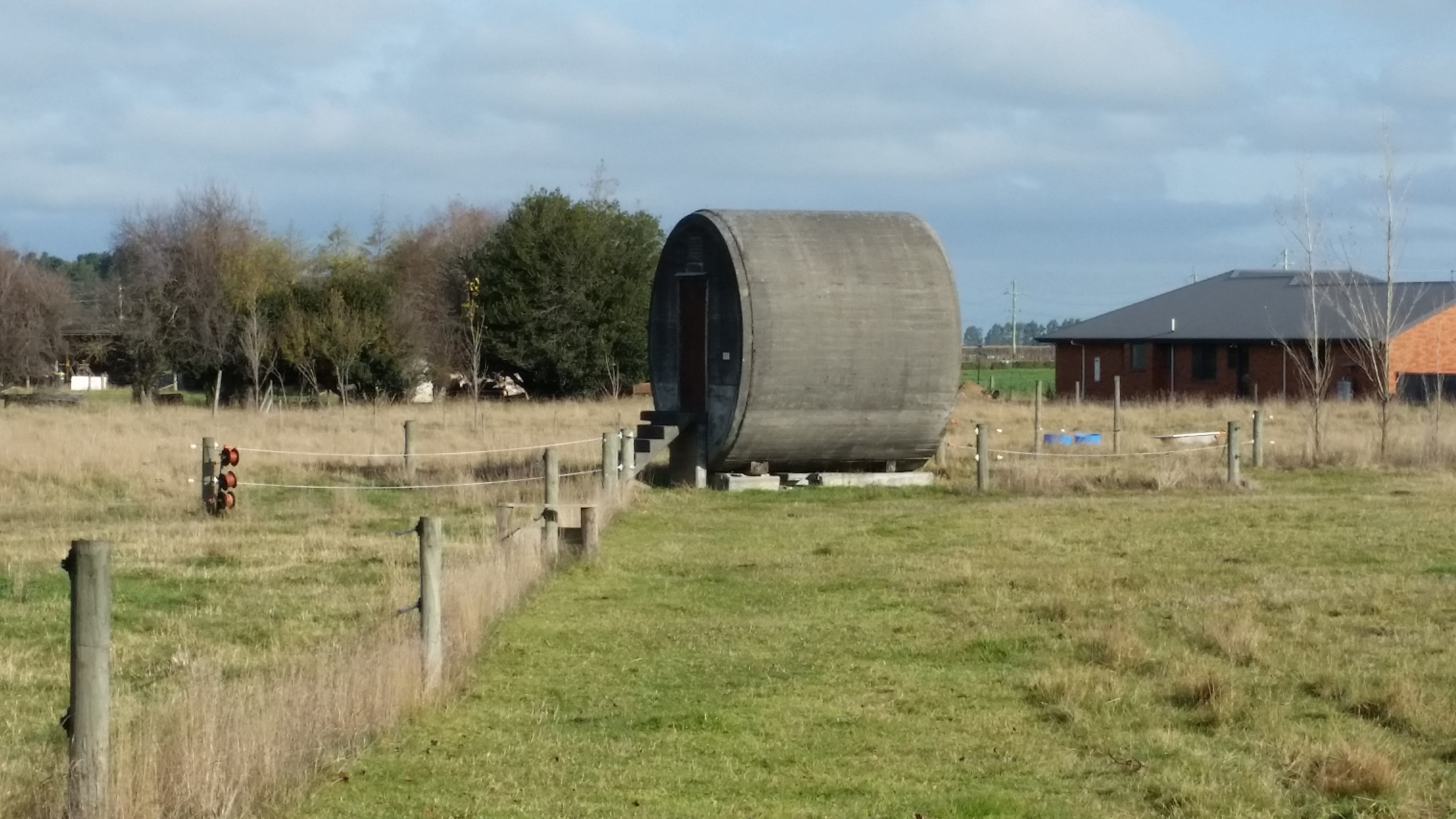
The Pipe Shed at Methven

A section of reinforced concrete pipe manufactured for the RDR scheme was retained and installed at a site in Methven that was formerly the Public Works Department's headquarters and the workers' accommodation camp for the scheme. Approximately 800 of these pipe sections were installed to complete the RDR project. The pipe section is 3.65 m (12.0 ft) in diameter, and is mounted on a base that was a pre-cast control gate for the water race. Concrete ends were installed and a timber floor fitted to turn the pipe section into a storage space. The Pipe Shed has been used for various purposes including an explosives store.

The Pipe Shed is a Category 1 listed Historic Place.

== Engineering heritage status ==
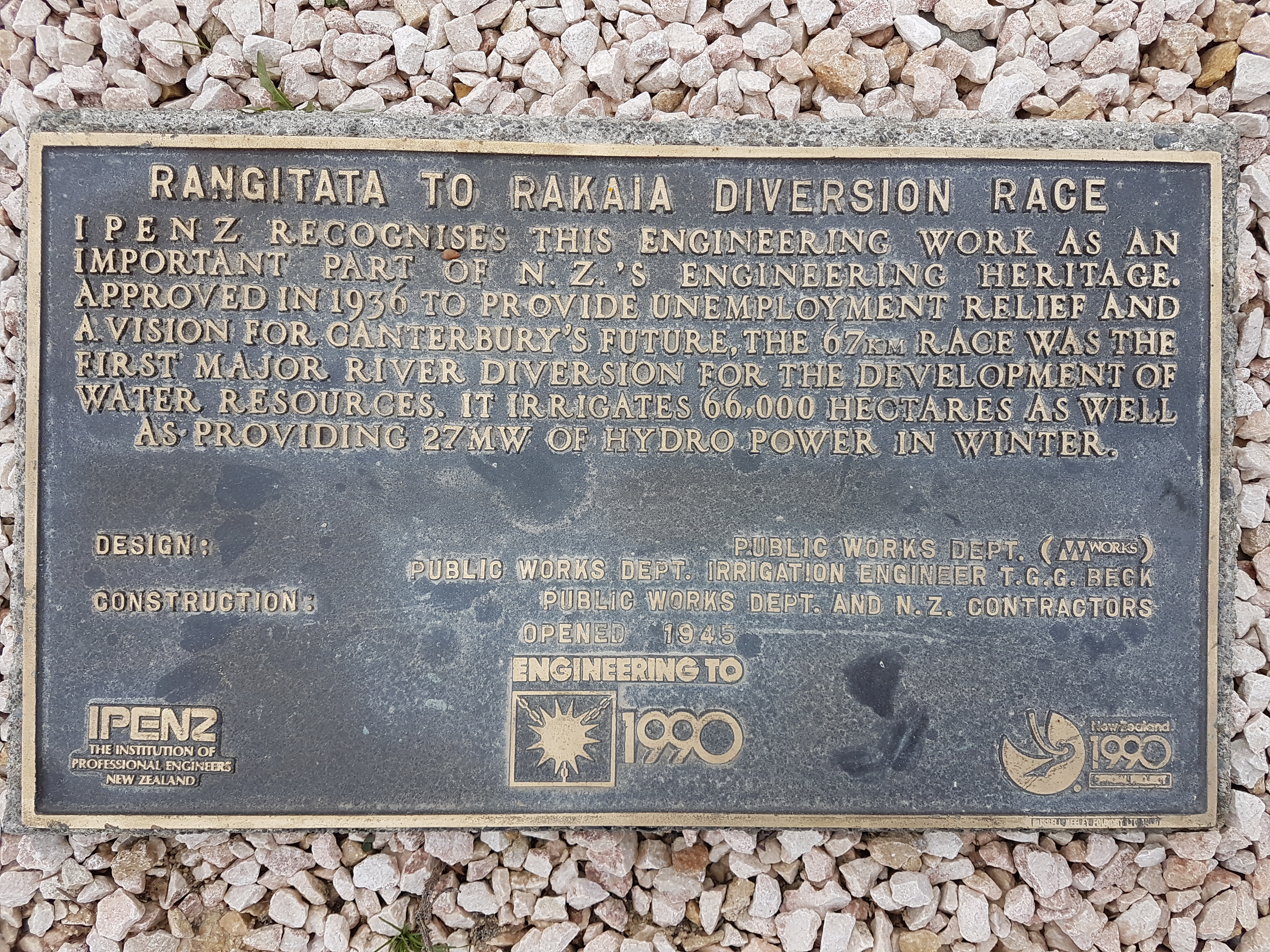
Engineering heritage plaque

In 1990, the Rangitata Diversion Race was recognised as a significant part of New Zealand's engineering heritage by the Institution of Professional Engineers New Zealand (now Engineering New Zealand). The recognition was part of the “Engineering to 1990” project which the Institution organised to help celebrate the country’s sesquicentenary in 1990. A plaque was unveiled to mark the significance of the irrigation race in the development of the nation. The citation on the plaque reads: "IPENZ recognises this engineering work as an important part of NZ's engineering heritage. Approved in 1936 to provide unemployment relief and a vision for Canterbury's future, the 67 km race was the first major river diversion for the development of water resources. It irrigates 66,000 hectares as well as providing 27 MW of hydro power in winter".

== Fish screen ==
In 2022, a new design of fish screen was installed at Klondyke, close to the point where water is diverted from the Rangitata river. It is the largest fish screen in New Zealand, and is intended to protect the sports fishery (mainly salmon), and native fish species. The fish screen is 105 metres (344 ft) long and allows over 30 cubic metres (1,100 cu ft) of water per second to pass through the screen at low velocity and flow into the RDR canal, but prevents fish going into the canal and being lost from the river. Fish travel through a 190 metres (620 ft) bypass to return to the Rangitata. The cost of the fish screen was $18 million, paid for by the owners and users of the RDR, and was reported to have doubled the annual charges of the RDR scheme for users.

== Proposed Klondyke storage facility ==
In September 2016, the Ashburton District Council published a Notice of application by RDRML for resource consents for a large water storage facility. The application included consents to divert an additional 10 cumecs from the Rangitata River, at times when the flow exceeds 142.6 cumecs, and to allow for the construction of a water storage facility with a capacity of 53 million m^{3}, to be built close to the RDR intake point on the Rangitata River. The resource consents were approved (with only minor exceptions) in July 2018 following a hearing by Ashburton District Council and Canterbury Regional Council.

However, the decision to grant the resource consents was appealed by several parties, including the New Zealand Salmon Anglers Association and Ngāi Tahu.

In June 2019, while the disputed application for resource consents was still at the mediation stage in the Environment Court, the Minister of Conservation Eugenie Sage, announced that a project was being developed in conjunction with partners to enhance the ecological health and biodiversity of the Rangitata river.

In July 2019, the New Zealand Salmon Anglers Association spokesman announced that they were withdrawing their appeal against the granting of consents for the extra 10 cumecs of water to be diverted at times of high river flows. The agreement to withdraw the appeal was linked to a detailed monitoring plan for the river.

In April 2020, New Zealand Salmon Anglers petitioned Environment Canterbury to enforce the Water Conservation Order on the Rangitata River. They claimed that the health of the river has not been fully considered, despite the Water Conservation Order having been in place since 2006. They expressed frustration that no statutory plan had been prepared for the river, even though that had been envisaged when the Water Conservation Order was established.

In February 2021, RDRML surrendered the consent for the extra 10 cumecs explaining that they did not wish to pursue the consent through to an Environment Court determination.

== Associated irrigation schemes ==
=== Barrhill-Chertsey irrigation scheme ===
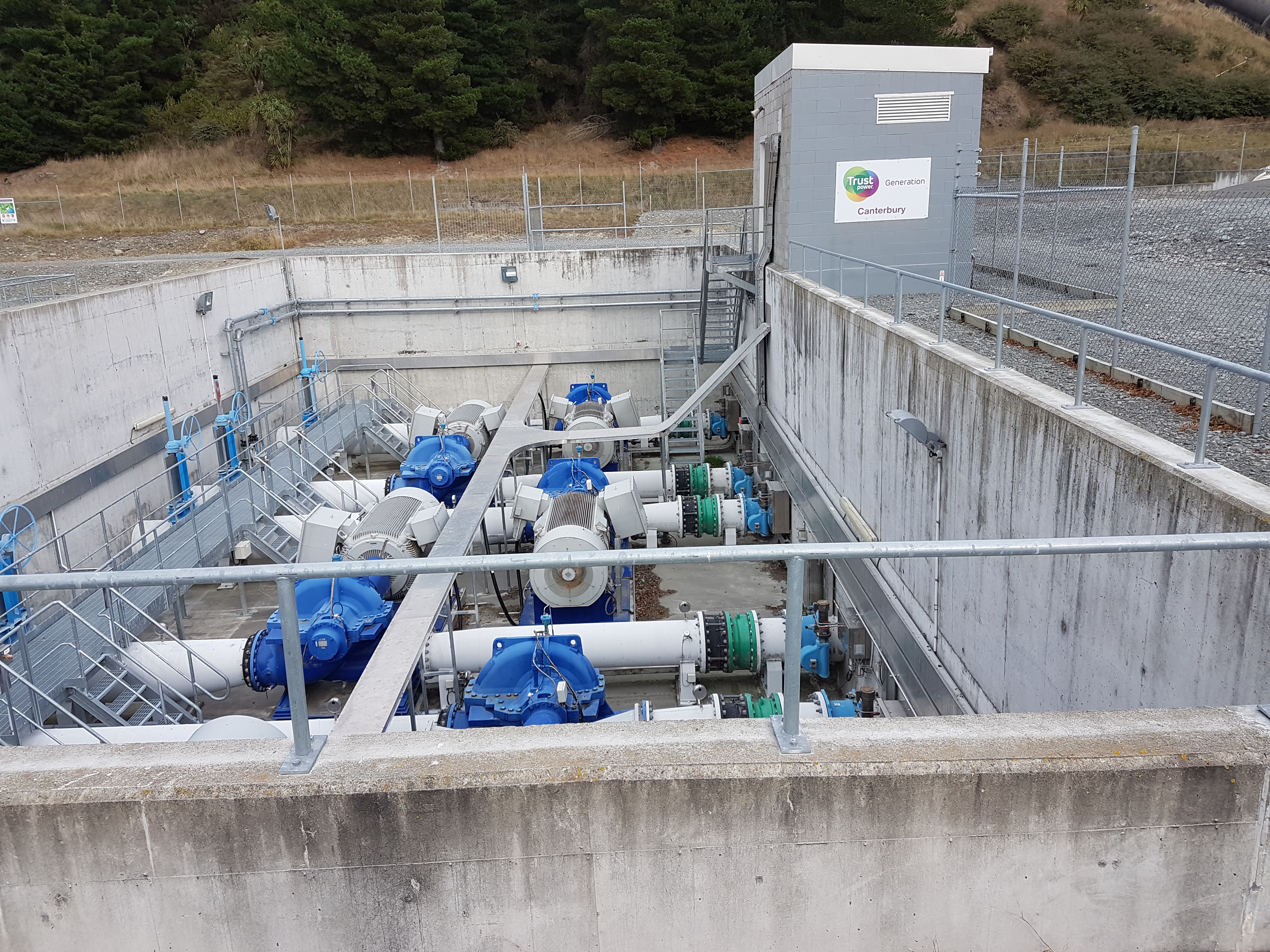
Highbank pump station

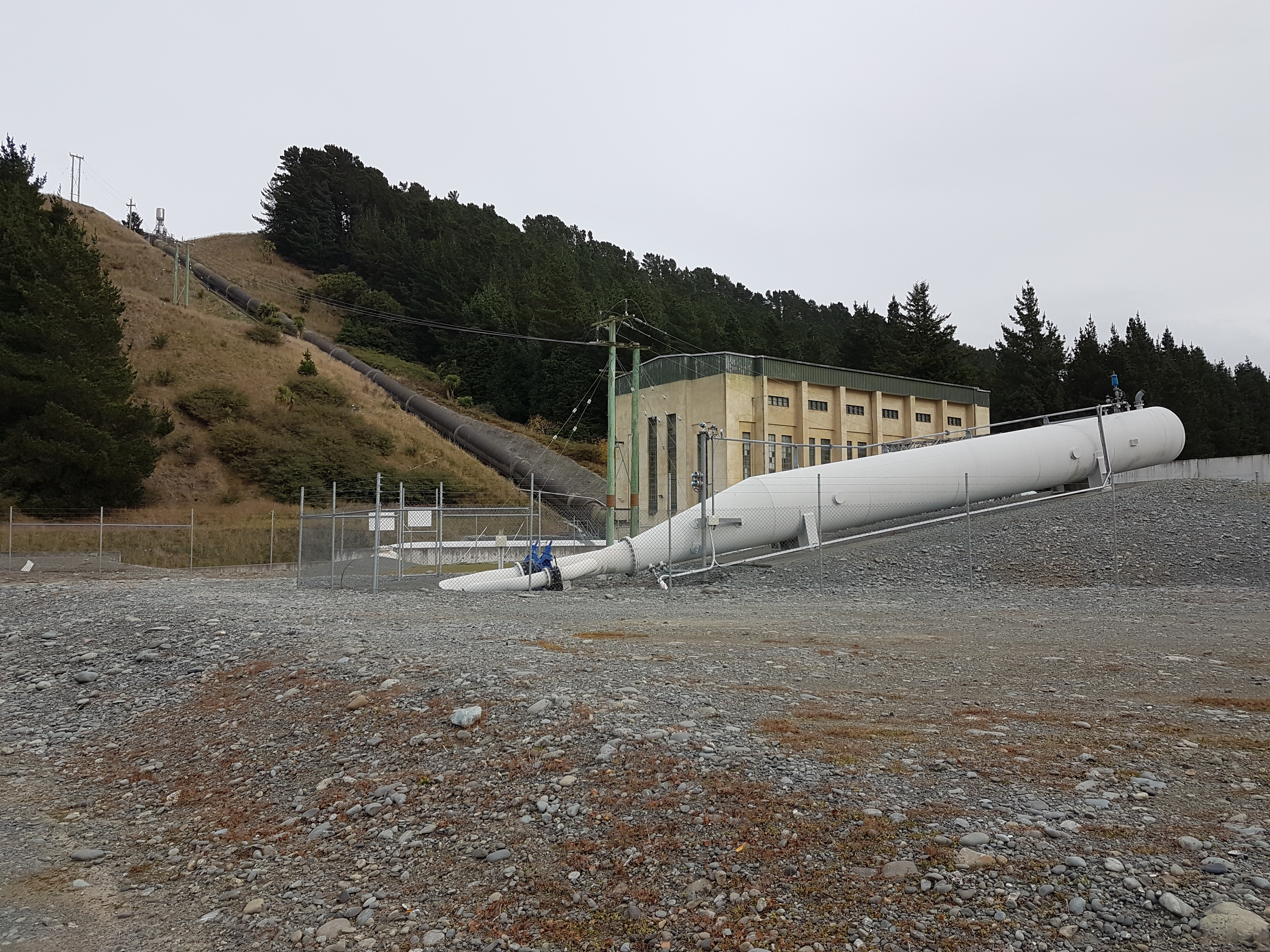
Air chamber at Highbank pump station

In 2010, a pumping station was commissioned adjacent to Highbank Power Station. The pumps lift water from the Rakaia River into the Rangitata Diversion Race, to provide additional water for the Barrhill-Chertsey irrigation scheme that supplies about 17,600 ha (43,000 acres) of farmland. The pumping station is used when the Highbank power station is not generating. RDRML supplies up to 8 cumecs to the Barrhill-Chertsey irrigation scheme via a water swap arrangement with the consents held by Barrhill-Chertsey Irrigation for water diversion from the Rakaia River.

A short canal alongside the existing tailrace from Highbank Power Station is used to divert water from the Rakaia River into the intake of the pumping station. Pumps then pass the water via a pipeline into the existing power station penstock, so that it flows up and into the Rangitata Diversion Race. There are six pumps, each capable of delivering one m^{3} per second. Each pump is driven by a 1.55 MW electric motor. Technical features of this development include the large bifurcation or ‘tee’ that was required to connect the new pump station pipeline to the original power station penstock. Another feature is a large 40 m^{3} air chamber that is used to manage pressure variations during pump station operations. The pumping station was originally developed as a joint venture between Barrhill-Chertsey Irrigation and Electricity Ashburton, but the irrigation company took full ownership in 2017.

=== Rangitata South Irrigation Scheme ===
The Rangitata South Irrigation Scheme is a separate irrigation system that has its off-take from the Rangitata River below and on the opposite river bank from the RDR, and harvests floodwater from the Rangitata when flows exceed 110 cumecs. The scheme includes 7 water storage ponds, holding a total of 16,500,000 m^{3} to distribute across 16,000 ha (40,000 acres) of formerly dry land farming area between the Rangitata and Orari rivers. There is a reciprocal agreement between the operators of this scheme and the RDR which allows the two schemes to share their consented water.

== Photo gallery ==
Rangitata Diversion Race

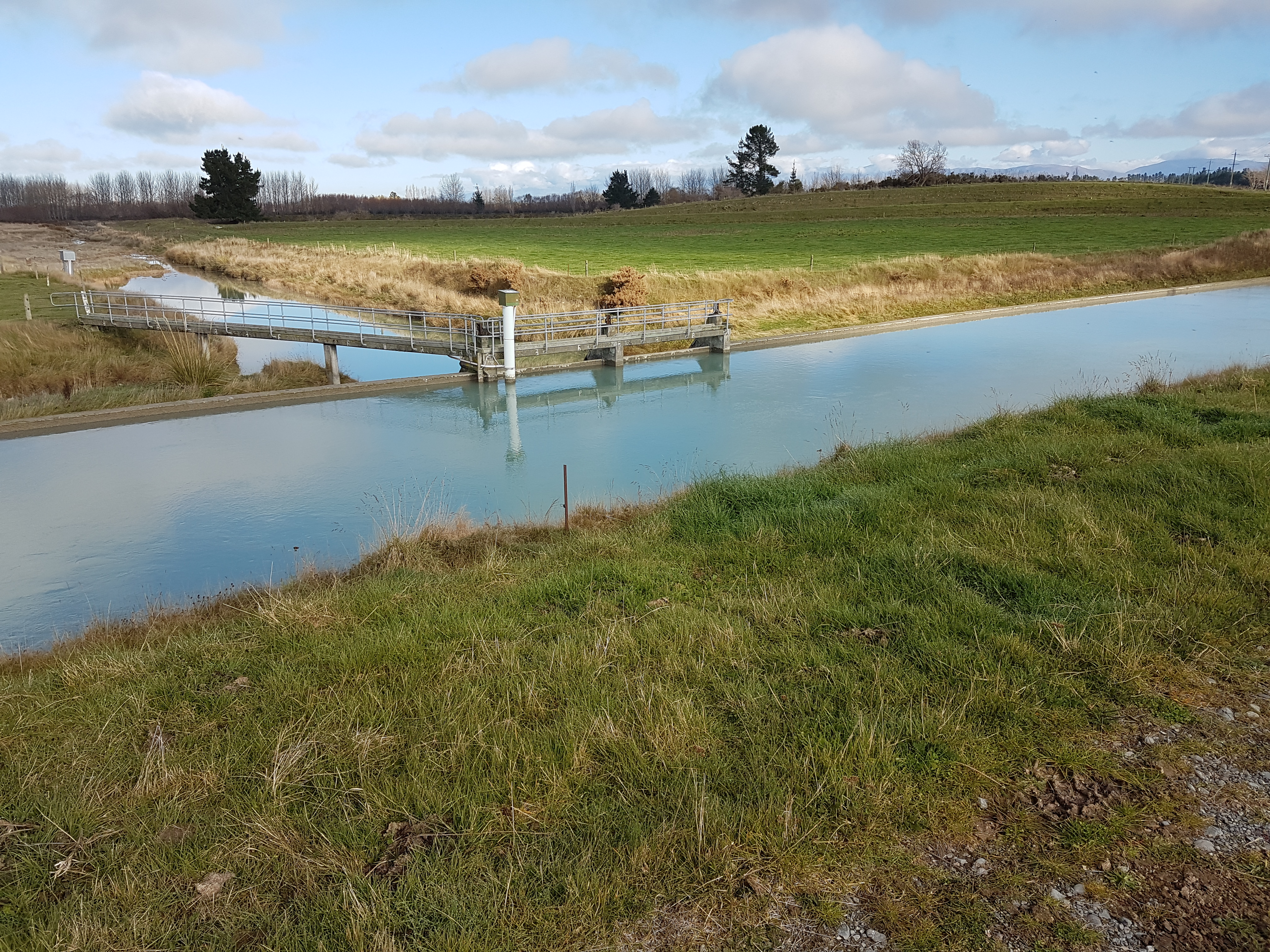
Overflow channel at north branch of Ashburton River/Hakatere

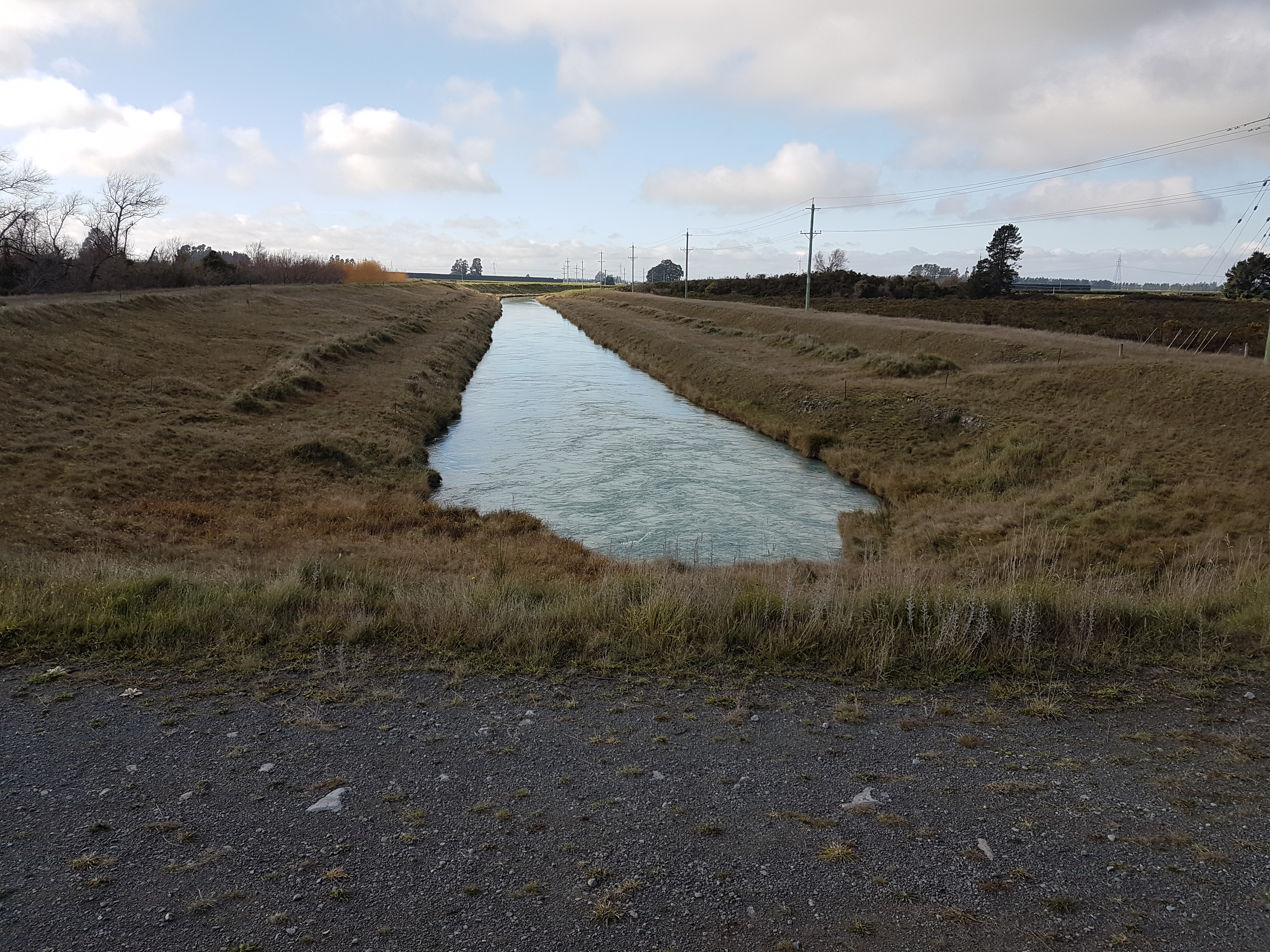
River syphon at north branch of Ashburton River/Hakatere

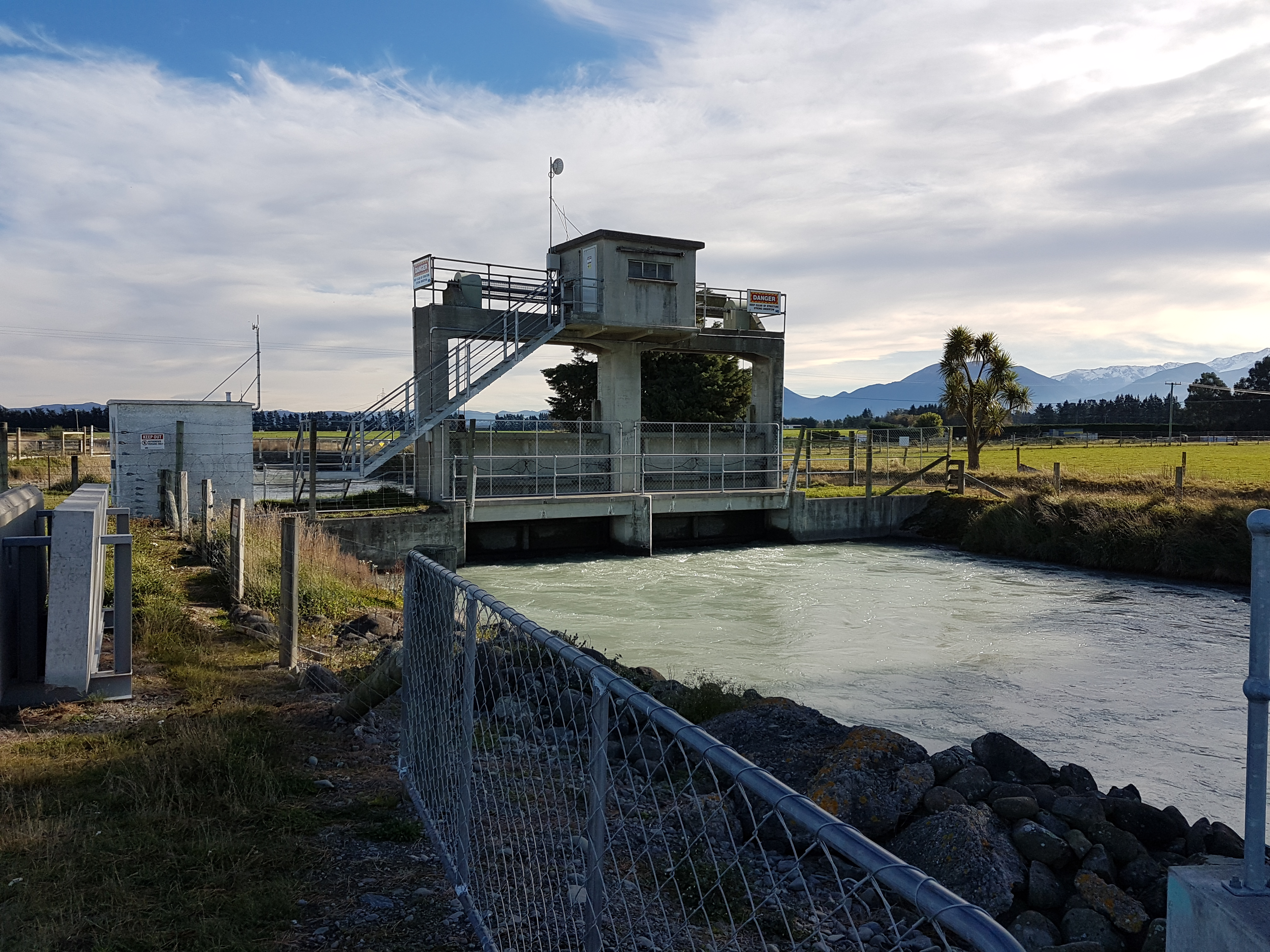
Methven Check Gates at ALIL Offtake, Ledgerwoods Rd

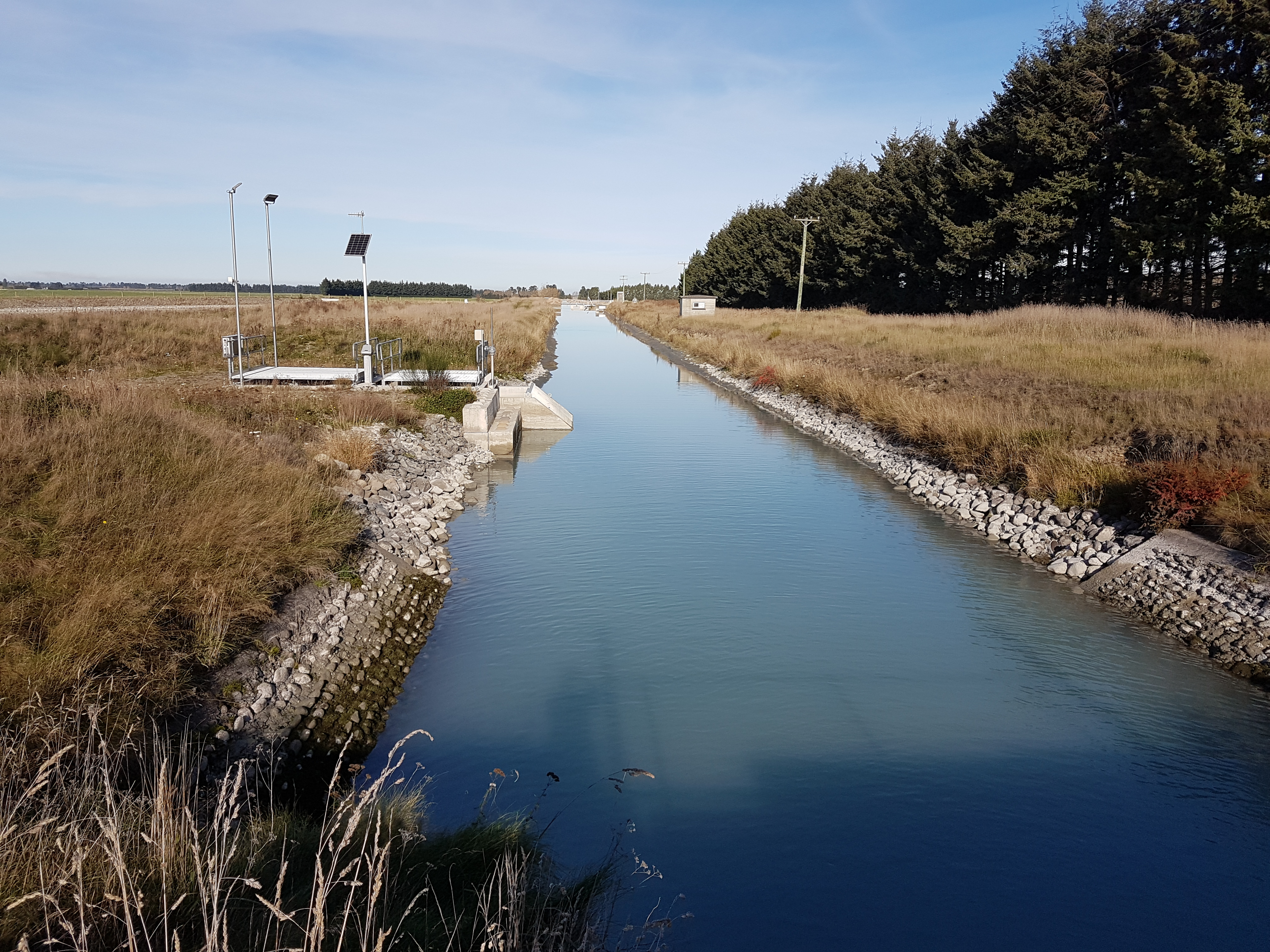
Ashburton Lyndhurst Irrigation Ltd's main race, Ledgerwoods Rd

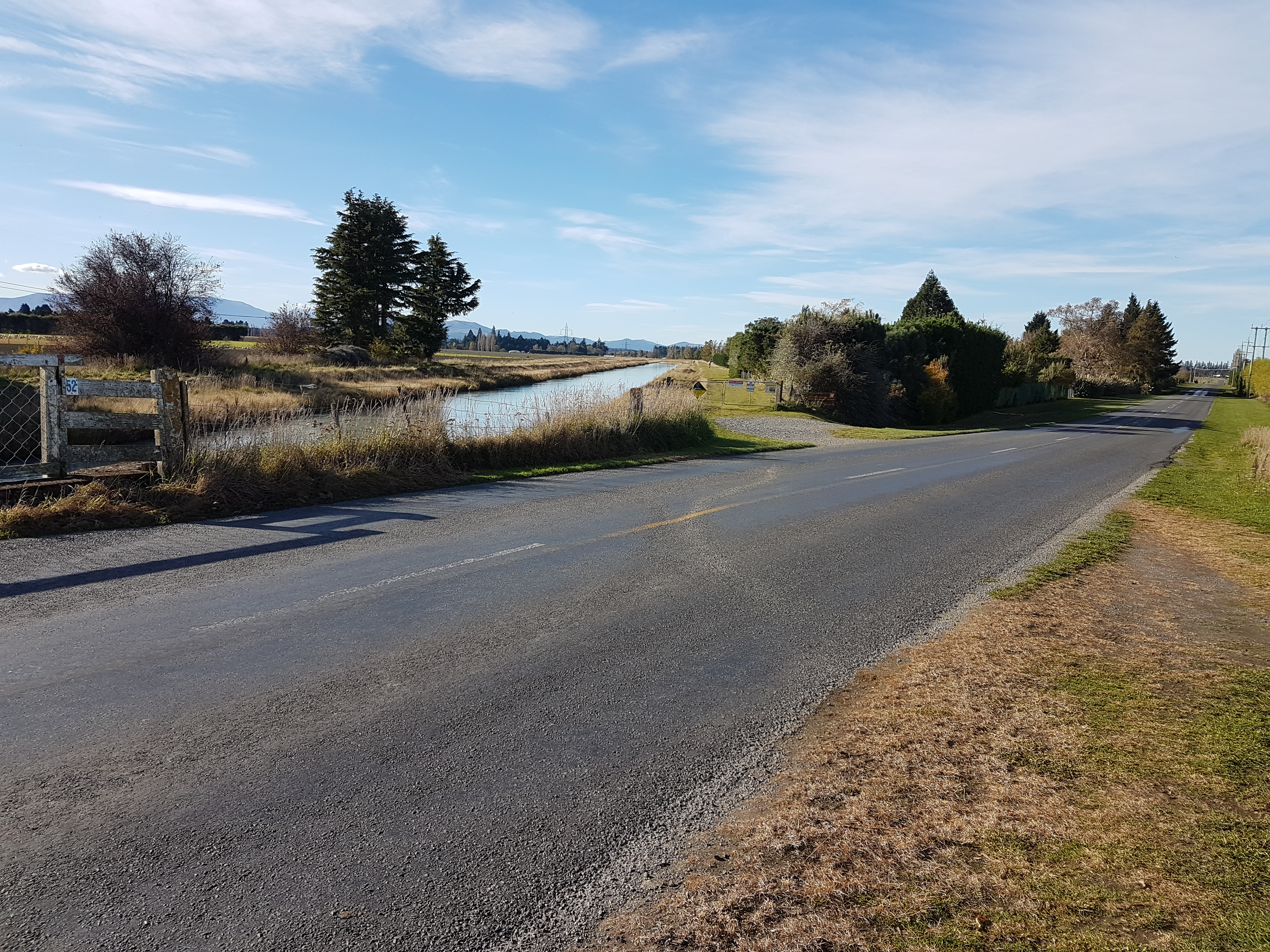
View north near Methven

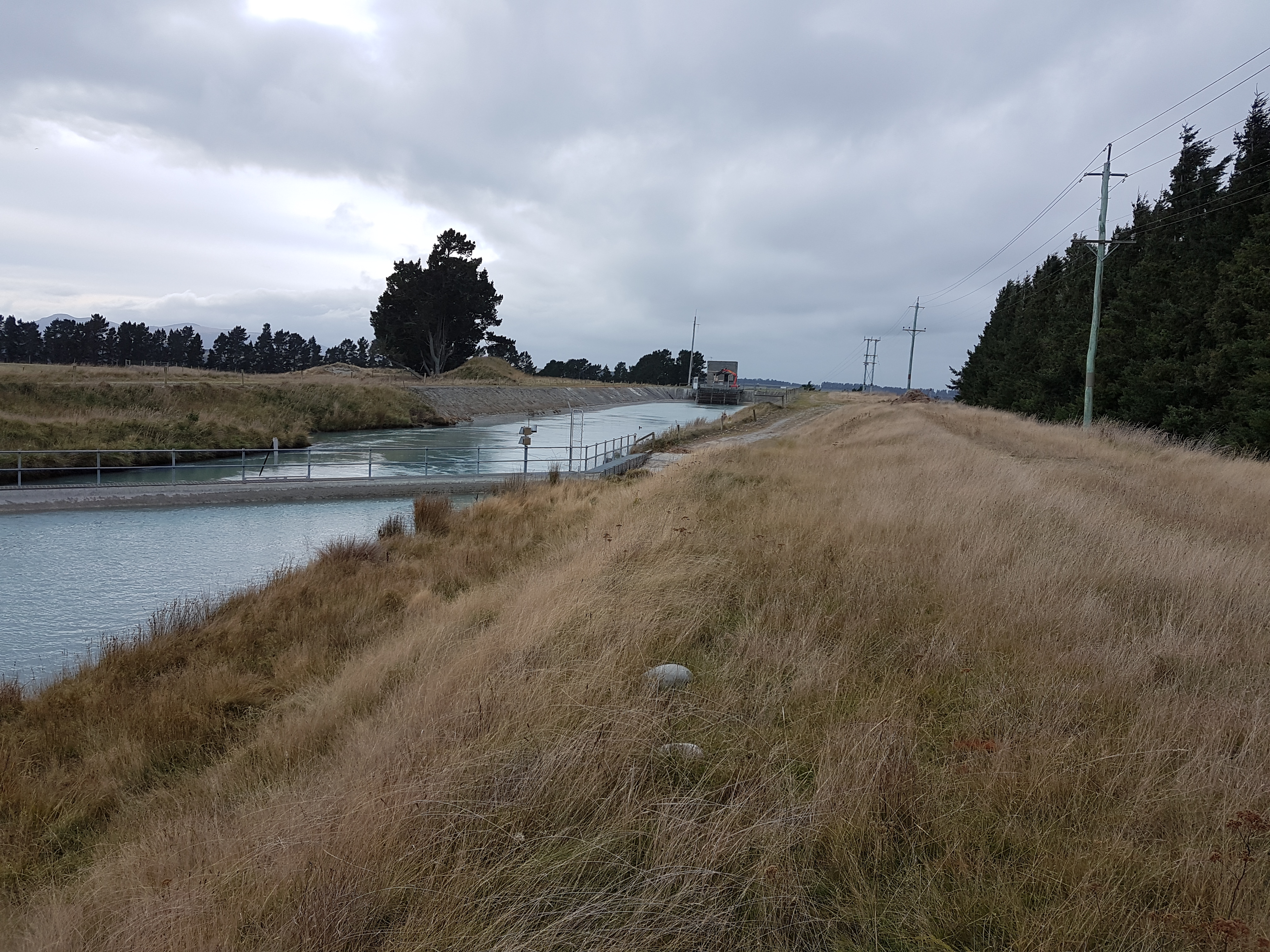
Terminal structure at Highbank

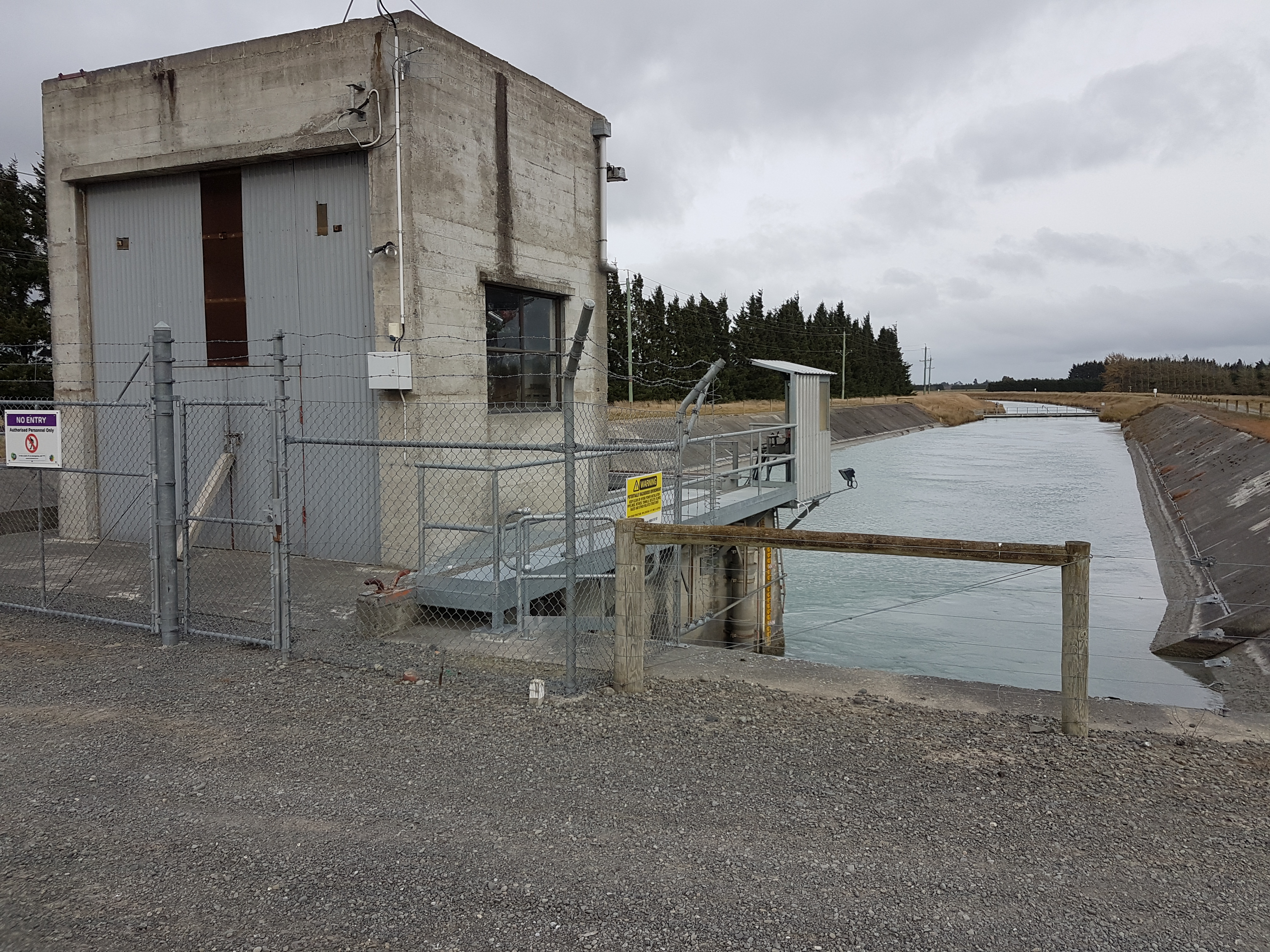
Terminal point at Highbank

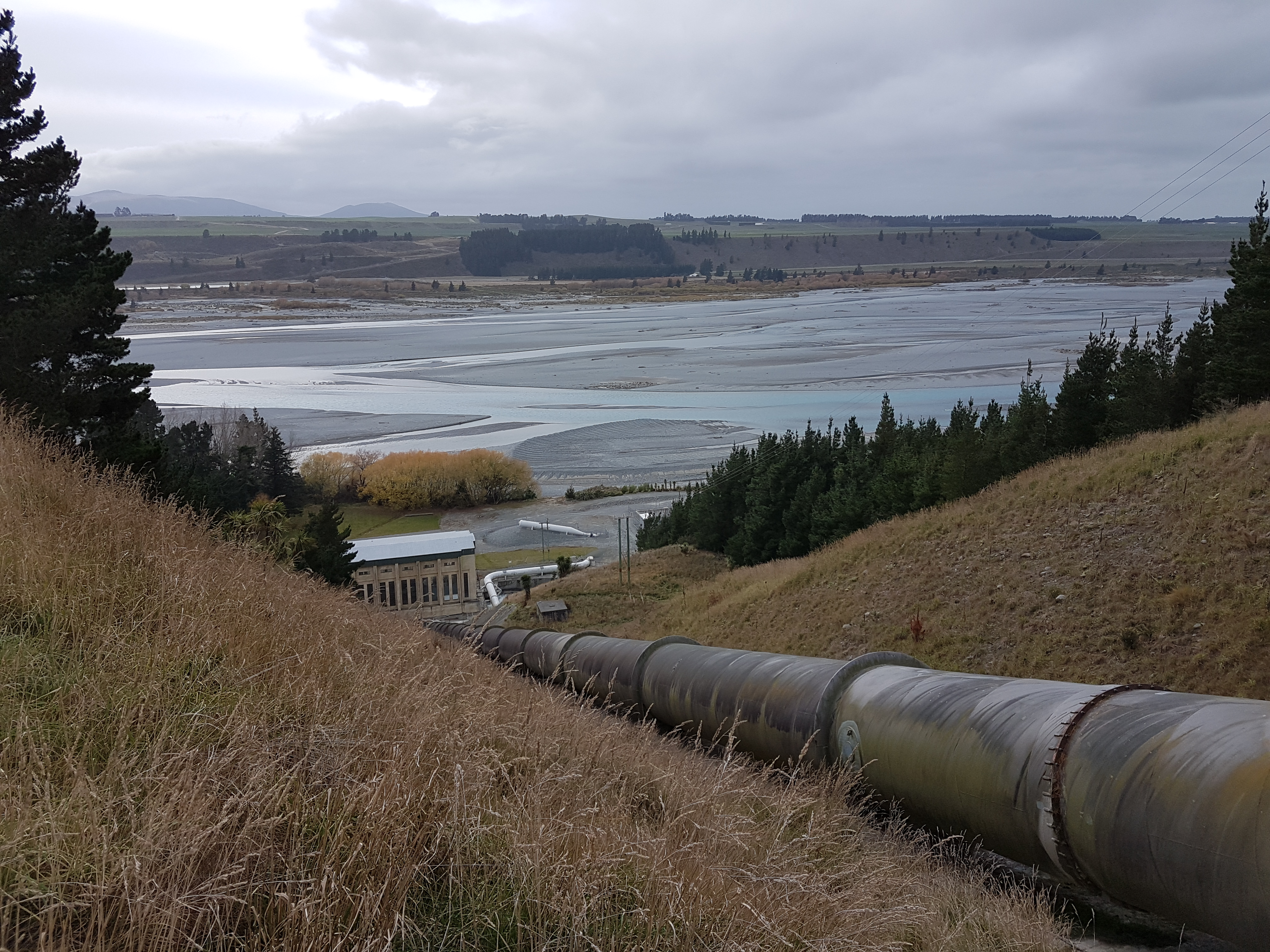
Highbank power station, penstock and pump station

== Bibliography ==
- Water put to work (PDF) (Booklet). Public Works Department. 1945 – via RDML (Mayfield Lions reprinted in 1993 as "Water put to work for power for irrigation")Print copy of original PWD booklet is held by Ashburton Library in their reference collection.
- Body, Anita; Cushnie, Angela (2015). Water, Farming and Families: The Mayfield Hinds Irrigation Scheme. Mayfield Hinds Irrigation Ltd. ISBN 978-0473323004 – via Irrigation New Zealand.
- Cameron, Brian (2009). Liquid Gold. ISBN 978-0-473-15346-5.
