= Rangitata Island =

Long lens-shaped island in Rangitata River, NZ

Coordinates: 44.1146°S 171.4479°E

Rangitata Island was a long lens-shaped island in the delta of the braided Rangitata River in Canterbury, New Zealand, approximately halfway between Timaru and Ashburton, New Zealand. The island was approximately 17 kilometres (11 mi) long and about 5 kilometres (3 mi) wide at its widest. Low lying, the area is mostly fertile farmland.

One of the country's largest delta islands, it was also the only one crossed by State Highway 1 (at the island's northern end), and the only place where the highway left both of the country's two main islands, and also by the Main South Line railway, and once had a small station, which was closed in 1962.

Rangitata Island Aerodrome is located just east of the State Highway 1 bridges, on Brodie Road, just off the Rangitata Island Road. The private field is available for public use and has two vectors. The field is the home of the Geraldine Flying Group.

The airfield also houses a collection of older microlight aircraft, as well as assorted aircraft parts, airframes and items of interest.

A more recent topographical map reveals that the river no longer runs around the south side of the island, so it is not technically an island any more. However, the settlement there is still named Rangitata Island, and the main artery from State Highway 1, Rangitata Island Road, still has that name.
