= Rangitata Island Aerodrome =

- IATA: none; ICAO: NZRI

Summary
- Airport type: Private
- Location: Rangitata Island
- Elevation AMSL: 288 ft (88 m)
- Coordinates: 44°05′06″S 171°24′57″E
- Website: http://realflying.co.nz/

Map
- Location of airport in South Island

Runways
Direction	Length		Surface
Direction	m	ft	Surface
12/30	1,040	3,412	Grass
03/21	545	1,788	Grass

Rangitata Island Aerodrome is a small airfield located on Rangitata Island halfway between Timaru and Ashburton. It is owned and operated by the Brodie family. It is home to the Geraldine Flying Group, De Havillands over New Zealand collection, New Zealand Microlight heritage museum, Shadows of Hawks World War I replica collection and the Ross Brodie Memorial museum and library.
