= Kathleen Miller (scientist) =

American economist

- Education: University of Washington
- Scientific career
- Thesis: The right to use vs. the right to sell : water rights in the western United States (1985)

Kathleen A. Miller is a climate scientist who specializes in the economics of climate change and its effects on institutions, management of risk and investment decisions.

== Education and career ==
Miller has a B.A. (1974), M.A. (1976), and a Ph.D. (1985) from the University of Washington.

Miller undertook her doctorate in economics at the University of Washington in 1985. Her dissertation was entitled The Right to Use vs. the Right to Sell: Water Rights in the Western United States. It explored the evolution of property institutions governing access to water in the arid western states and modelled the operation and effects of these institutions in the presence of both scarcity and inter-temporal variability in water supplies.

== Career ==
She joined the staff at the National Center for Atmospheric Research in Colorado in 1985 as a Scientist I and was promoted to Scientist III in 1993.

Miller has worked on multiple chapters in the Assessment Review reports from the Intergovernmental Panel on Climate Change. and Miller contributed to the IPCC report that was awarded the 2007 Nobel Peace Prize. Specifically she was one of two coordinating lead authors on the chapter on North America in the report Climate Change 2001: Impacts, Adaptations and Vulnerability.and one of the lead authors on the technical summary. For the 2007 IPCC report she was one of eight lead authors on Chapter 3: Freshwater resources and their management.

Miller was one of four editors of the 2016 book Water Policy and Planning in a Variable and Changing Climate, a comprehensive review of issues for water planning and policy in the United States.

== Bibliography ==
Kathleen A. Miller; David Noble Yates (2006). Climate Change and Water Resources: A Primer for Municipal Water Providers. American Water Works Association. ISBN 978-1-58321-466-4.

Kundzewicz, Z. W.; Mata, L. J.; Arnell, N. W.; Doll, P.; Kabat, P.; Jimenez, B.; Miller, K.; Oki, T.; Zekai, S. (2007), Parry, M. L.; Canziani, O. F.; Palutikof, J. P.; van der Linden, P. J. (eds.), Freshwater resources and their management, Cambridge University Press, pp. 173–210, ISBN 978-0-521-88009-1, archived from the original on 2007-12-11

Miller, Kathleen A.; Munro, Gordon R. (2004-01-01). "Climate and Cooperation: A New Perspective on the Management of Shared Fish Stocks". Marine Resource Economics. 19 (3): 367–393. doi:10.1086/mre.19.3.42629440. ISSN 0738-1360. S2CID 17624060.

Miller, Kathleen A.; Rhodes, Steven L.; Macdonnell, Lawrence J. (1997). "Water Allocation in a Changing Climate: Institutions and Adaptation". Climatic Change. 35 (2): 157–177. doi:10.1023/A:1005300529862. S2CID 154839149.

Cohen, Stewart J.; Miller, Kathleen A.; Hamlet, Alan F.; Avis, Wendy (2000-06-01). "Climate Change and Resource Management in the Columbia River Basin". Water International. 25 (2): 253–272. doi:10.1080/02508060008686827. ISSN 0250-8060. S2CID 133265163.

Rasmussen, Roy; Liu, Changhai; Ikeda, Kyoko; Gochis, David; Yates, David; Chen, Fei; Tewari, Mukul; Barlage, Michael; Dudhia, Jimy; Yu, Wei; Miller, Kathleen; Arsenault, Kristi; Grubišić, Vanda; Thompson, Greg; Gutmann, Ethan (15 June 2011). "High-Resolution Coupled Climate Runoff Simulations of Seasonal Snowfall over Colorado: A Process Study of Current and Warmer Climate". Journal of Climate. 24 (12): 3015–3048. Bibcode:2011JCli...24.3015R. doi:10.1175/2010JCLI3985.1. ISSN 0894-8755.
