= Rangitata Gorge =

Coordinates: 43°45′14.49″S 171°12′39.81″E

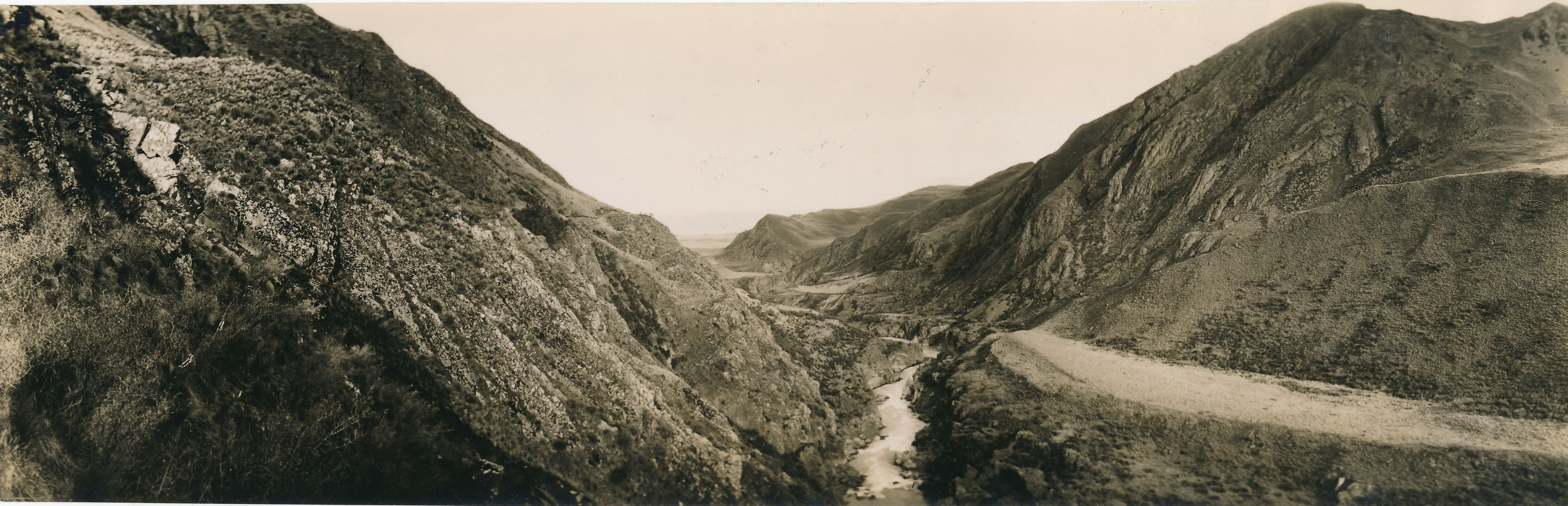
Photo by Bobbie Barwell of the Rangitata Gorge in the 1930s

The Rangitata Gorge is a gorge located in the Canterbury High Country in the South Island of New Zealand. The narrow gorge links the headwaters of the Rangitata River with the fertile Canterbury Plains. The Rangitata gorge is commercially rafted by a local company. It is also a popular river for visiting kayakers, fishermen and adventurist locals in jet boats. The gorge is a class IV to V+ depending on the flow of the river and home to the notable rapids including Rooster's Tail, Pencil Sharpener, The Pinch, Pigs Trough and Hells Gate.

== Rangitata Diversion Race ==
The Rangitata Diversion Race takes water from Klondyke at the bottom of the gorge. Construction of the race began in 1937 and completed in 1944. Today the race is 67 kilometers long and carries a maximum of 30 cubic metres of water per second. The race provides water for various irrigation systems and two power plants at Highbank and Montalto. After supplying irrigation demand, the canal discharges the remaining water via Highbank Power Station into the Rakaia River.

== Tenehaun Conservation Area ==
On the north bank of the gorge is the Tenehaun Conservation Area which has good views of the gorge. Activities include hiking and mountain biking.
