= Kathleen Miller (swimmer) =

New Zealander swimmer

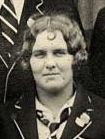
- Miller in 1928

Personal information
- Full name: Nora Kathleen Miller
- Born: 21 April 1909 Dunedin, New Zealand
- Died: 16 April 1963 (aged 53) Wanganui, New Zealand

Sport
- Sport: Swimming

Nora Kathleen "Kay" Miller (21 April 1909 – 16 April 1963), later known as Kathleen McFarlane, was a New Zealand swimmer.

Miller was born in 1909 in Dunedin. She was the daughter of Donald Miller and his wife, Annie Maria (née Lefevre). She was the youngest of six daughters, and her father died when she was less than one year old. Miller went to primary schools in Palmerston, in the Wellington suburb of Kaikorai, and High Street School in Dunedin. From 1924, she attended Otago Girls' High School for two years.

Miller competed in two events at the 1928 Summer Olympics in Amsterdam. She was 19 at the time of the Olympics and her mother, Annie Miller, travelled with the New Zealand Olympic team as a chaperone. Miller entered both the 100 metre freestyle and the 400 metre freestyle, where she qualified for the semi-finals in both events, but failed to reach the final in either. She won her last national titles in 1930 and then began coaching. She became a representative hockey player for Otago and later for Wellington. She worked at Chilton House School in Lower Hutt as sports and physical culture mistress.

On 25 May 1940, she married Kenneth Albert "Ken" McFarlane at Wanganui's St Paul's Presbyterian Church. She was afterwards known as Kathleen McFarlane or Kay McFarlane, and the McFarlanes lived in Wanganui. She died in Wanganui on 16 April 1963; the McFarlanes did not have any children.
