= Rangitata River =

River in New Zealand

Coordinates: 44°12′S 171°30′E

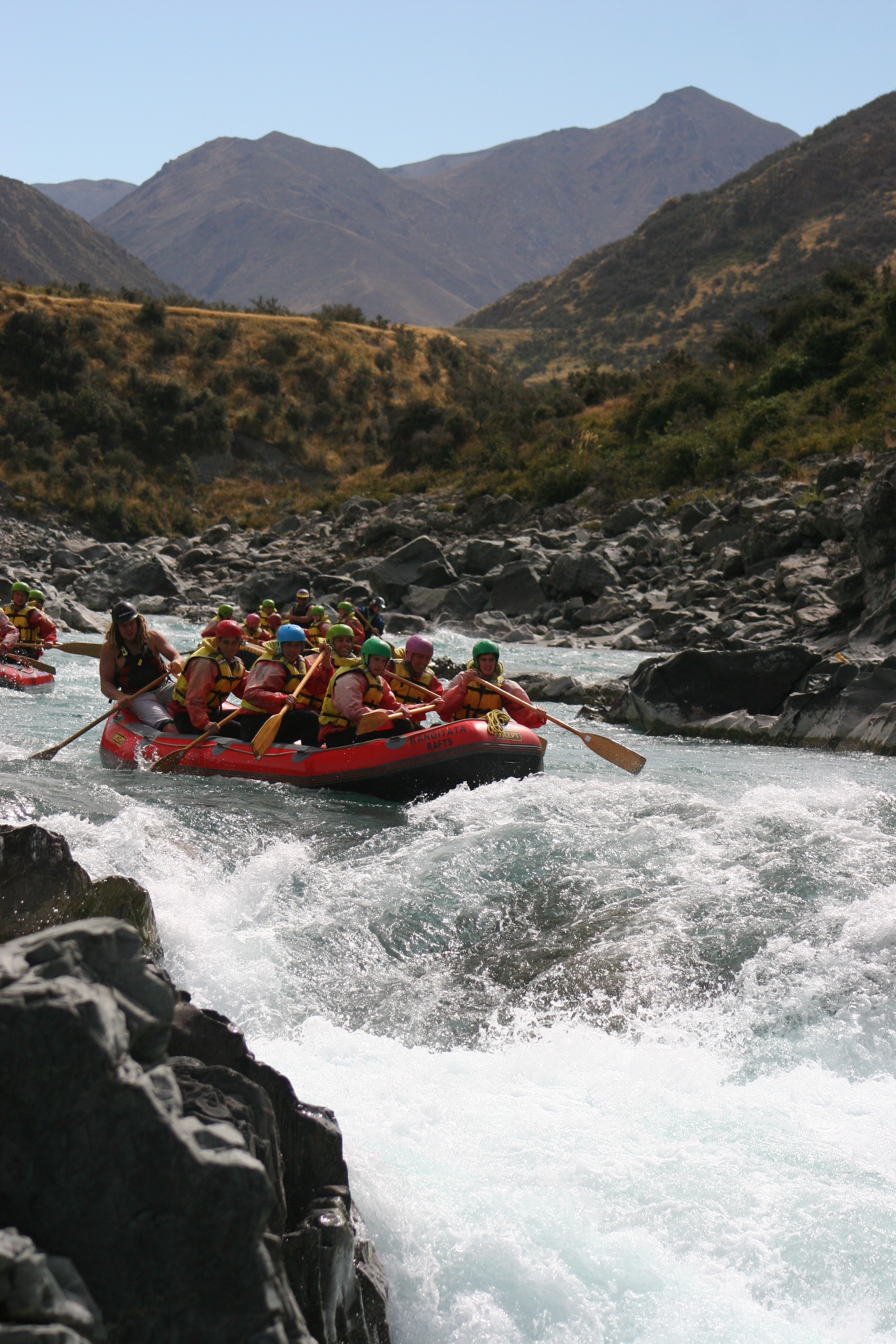
Rafting on the Rangitata River in 2006

The Rangitata River is one of the braided rivers of the Canterbury Plains in southern New Zealand. It flows southeast for 120 kilometres (75 mi) from the Southern Alps, entering the Pacific Ocean 30 kilometres (19 mi) northeast of Timaru. The river has a catchment area of 1,773 square kilometres (685 mi^{2}), and a mean annual flow of 95 cubic metres per second (3,400 cu ft/s) at Klondyke.

The Māori name "Rangitata" (Rakitata) has been variously translated as "day of lowering clouds", "close sky", and "the side of the sky".

The river formed the Rangitata Valley, in the center of the Southern Alps, and the on-location photography of the Edoras set from The Lord of the Rings: The Two Towers, and The Return of the King was filmed in this valley, on and around Mount Sunday. Several remote sheep stations are located near Mount Sunday. These include Mesopotamia, Mt Potts, and Erewhon. Erewhon was named by Samuel Butler who was the first white settler to live at the Mesopotamia sheep station. Erewhon is also the name of a novel written by Butler anonymously in 1872. In 1932 an outdoor ice skating rink was established by the river beneath Mount Harper.

Before the river enters the Canterbury Plains, the river flows through the Rangitata Gorge where part of it is diverted to the Rangitata Diversion Race (RDR) for irrigation and hydroelectric generation. The RDR was built between 2 April 1937 and 1944, and supplies water to the Montalto and Highbank schemes before joining the Rakaia River. The entry point has New Zealand's first acoustic fish fence, keeping salmon smolt in the river and preventing them ending up on farmland.

There is a second irrigation system which has its off take below and on the opposite river bank from the RDR. This system is called the Rangitata South Irrigation Scheme. This system runs through a static fish screen on its way into 7 man made dams, holding a total of 18,000,000 m3 of water to distribute across 16,000ha of formerly dry land farming area. This system has a fish spawning section to help bolster the number of sport fish available for recreational fishermen.

The Rangitata is the most fished river in the Central South Island Region, having a self-sustaining Chinook salmon fishery. The salmon account for about 75 percent of angler activity on the river, other species fished are brown trout, rainbow trout and brook char.

== History ==
Towards its mouth, the river originally split into two streams, forming a large delta island (Rangitata Island). This island was crossed by State Highway 1 and the Main South Line railway between Ealing and Rangitata and thus was an island connected directly by New Zealand's main state highway and one of its primary railway lines. However, the south branch of this split has since been blocked, and the riverbed developed for agricultural purposes. Its course remains as a flood plain, but water does not normally flow here any longer.

On 23 December 1999, Fish and Game New Zealand lodged an application for a water conservation order on the Rangitata River. In June 2006, the water conservation order was gazetted.

A locomotive, DC 4686, ended up completely submerged in the river on 4 January 2002, after floodwater undermined a stopbank supporting the railway line, causing a derailment.

In April 2024 a pier of the rail bridge washed away due to heavy rain, which caused the bridge to sag, and was temporarily closed, reopening with a temporary pier a fortnight later, on 26 April.

== See also ==
- Rangitata Diversion Race
