= Highbank Power Station =

Hydro power station in New Zealand

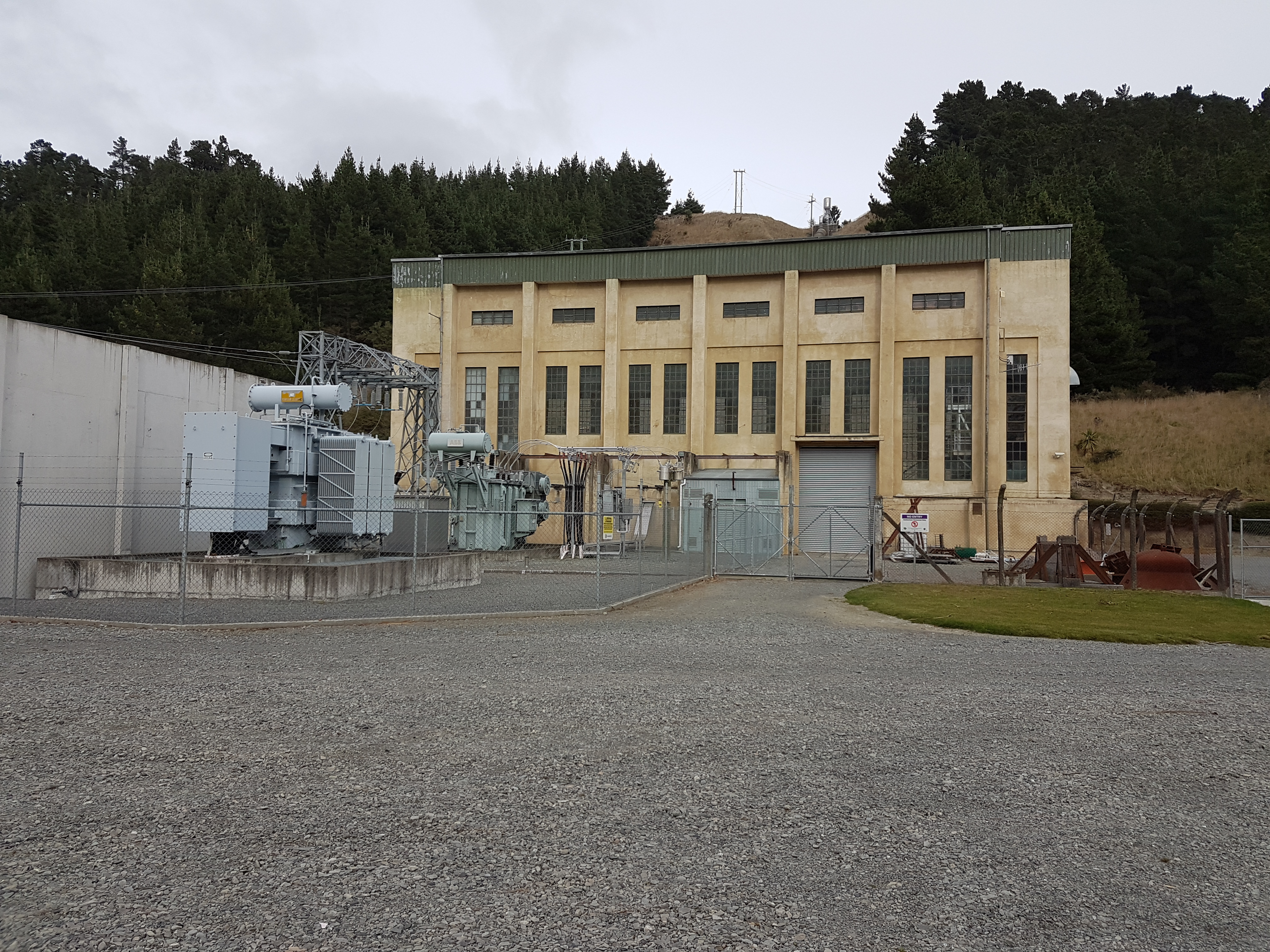
- Image of the generating house and transmission equipment.
- Country: New Zealand
- Location: Ashburton District
- Coordinates: 43°34′23″S 171°44′08″E
- Status: Operational
- Construction began: 1939
- Commission date: 16 June 1945 (81 years ago)
- Owner: Manawa Energy
- Operator: Manawa Energy
- Site area: 49.5 hectares (122 acres)
- Hydraulic head: 104 m (342 ft)
- Maximum discharge rate: 40 m^{3}/s (1,400 cu ft/s)

Power generation
- Nameplate capacity: 26.5 MW
- Annual net output: 98 GWh

External links
- Website: Highbank Power Scheme
- Commons: Related media on Commons

The Highbank Power Station is a small run-of-the-river-hydroelectric power station in the Ashburton District of the South Island of New Zealand. Owned and operated by Manawa Energy, the station generates power from the Rangitata Diversion Race (RDR) irrigation scheme when agricultural water demand is low. Water is discharged into the Rakaia River when the station is generating. On 16 June 1945 the Minister of Works, Bob Semple, opened the power station, and "set the 36,000bhp in motion". Additional equipment installed at the site in 2010 enables pumping of water from the Rakaia River back up the penstock to increase the water availability in the RDR for agricultural irrigation during the peak summer months.

== Construction ==
The Highbank Power Station was constructed as part of the Rangitata Diversion Race (RDR) irrigation scheme by the Public Works Department.

The primary purpose of the RDR scheme was for the irrigation of farmland, not the generation of electricity. This irrigation diversion race is the source of the water for the Highbank Power Station. When agricultural demand for water is low the water is used by the station to generate electricity, this is typically during the winter months.

Work began in the early 1940s, starting with the construction of an access road.

The outbreak of World War II saw the project delayed due to manufacturing, material, and manpower shortages. The project's completion in June 1945 followed the completion of the RDR in September 1944.

An unfortunate event was the sinking by enemy action of the ship which was carrying to New Zealand the stator for the generator at Highbank. This necessitated the manufacture of a new stator in England.

There was considerable damage by flooding in the area of the Highbank irrigation and power scheme due to floods in February 1945. This necessitated the village of Highbank being relocated 390 m (0.24 mi) upstream of the powerhouse and a new approach road made.

=== Power house ===
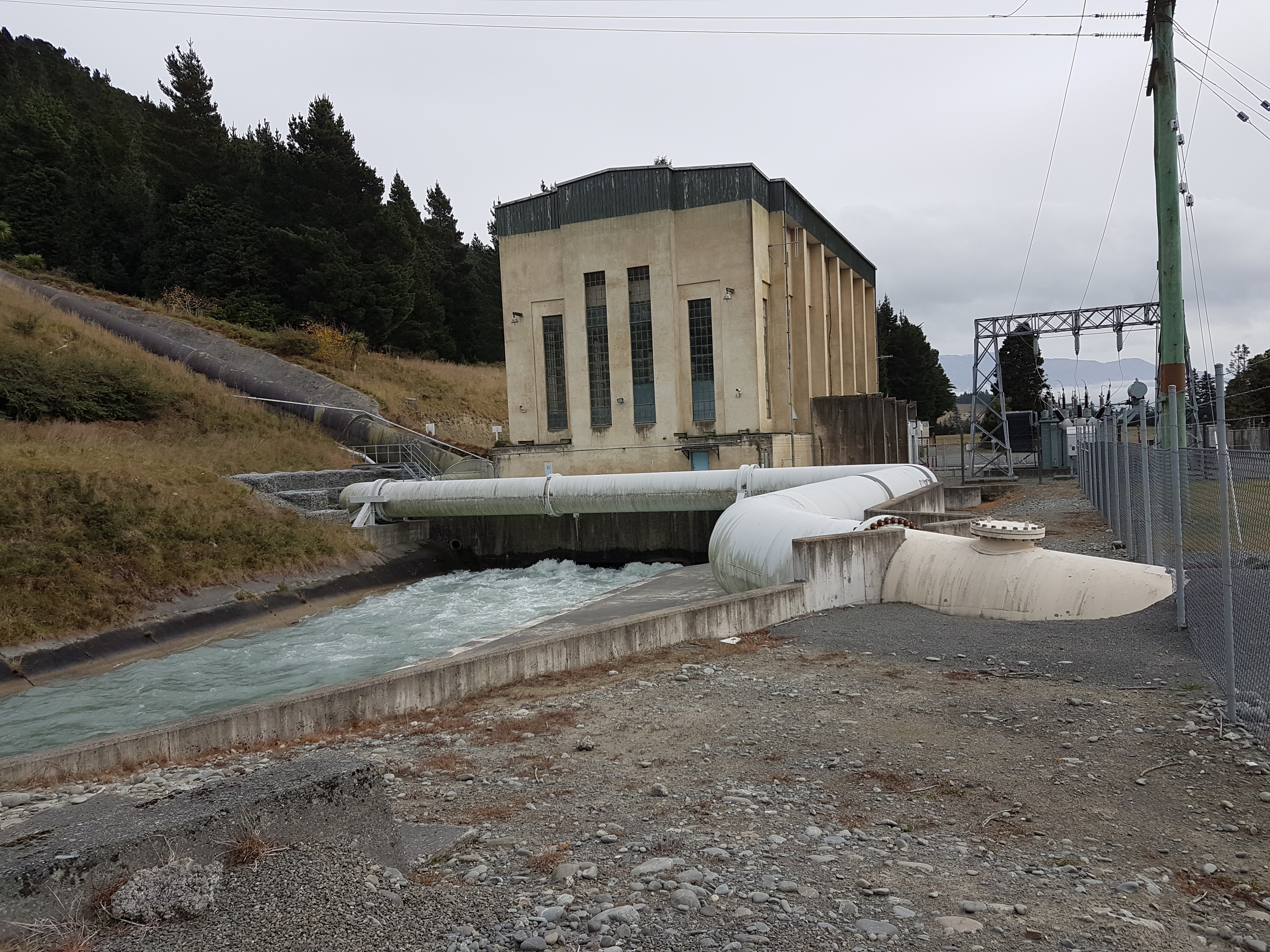
The SE face of the power house, and the discharge race.

Construction began in 1939, with the power house structure finished in 1942. The modern reinforced concrete structure is some 37 metres (120 ft) long and 16 metres (52 ft) wide. The height of approximately 16 metres (52 ft) allowed for the installation of both the 90-ton crane, and 10-ton auxiliary hoist.

== Generation equipment ==
=== Generator and turbine ===
Both the generator and turbine were manufactured by English Electric and installed from 1942 until the commissioning in 1945. The generator installed was the largest single generating unit in New Zealand at the time of its installation.

The single vertical shaft generator is driven by a 36,000 bhp (27 MW) Francis turbine. The English Electric generator is a 20‑pole unit rated for 26.5 MW output with a synchronous speed of 300 rpm.

=== Transmission ===
Power is generated at 11 kV and stepped up at the station to 66 kV for transmission via a 66 kV spur line to Methven connecting to the rest of the EA Networks 66 kV system at Methven Substation.

== Upgrades ==
=== Early years ===
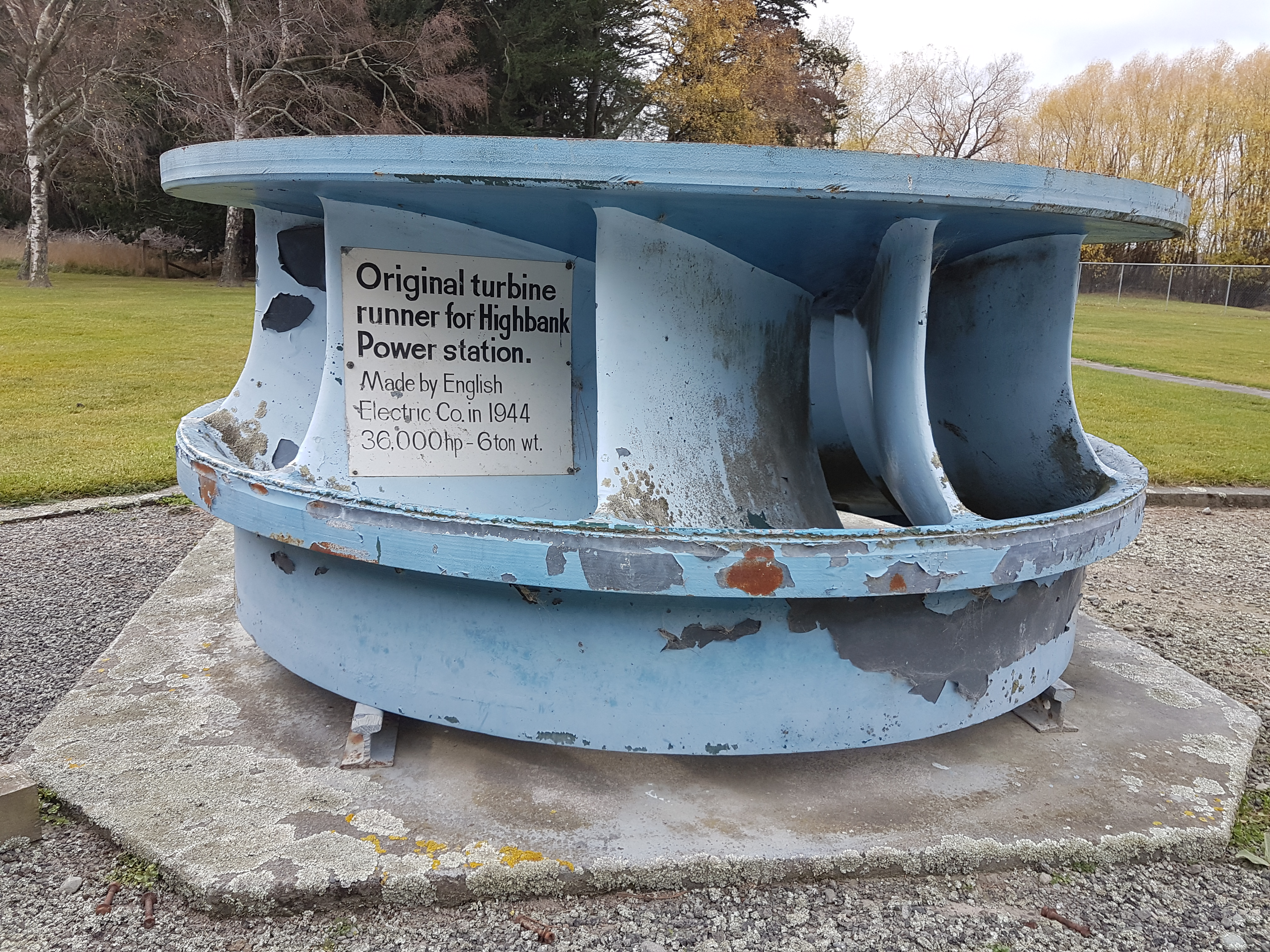
Original turbine runner replaced during repair, now on display

In the 1970s the station generation capacity had reduced to approximately 65% of the original rated capacity due to sediment build-up and wear on mechanical components. This led to the turbine runner being replaced along with improvements in sediment control at the canal intake and ongoing removal of sediments to reinstate the original performance.

=== Pump station ===
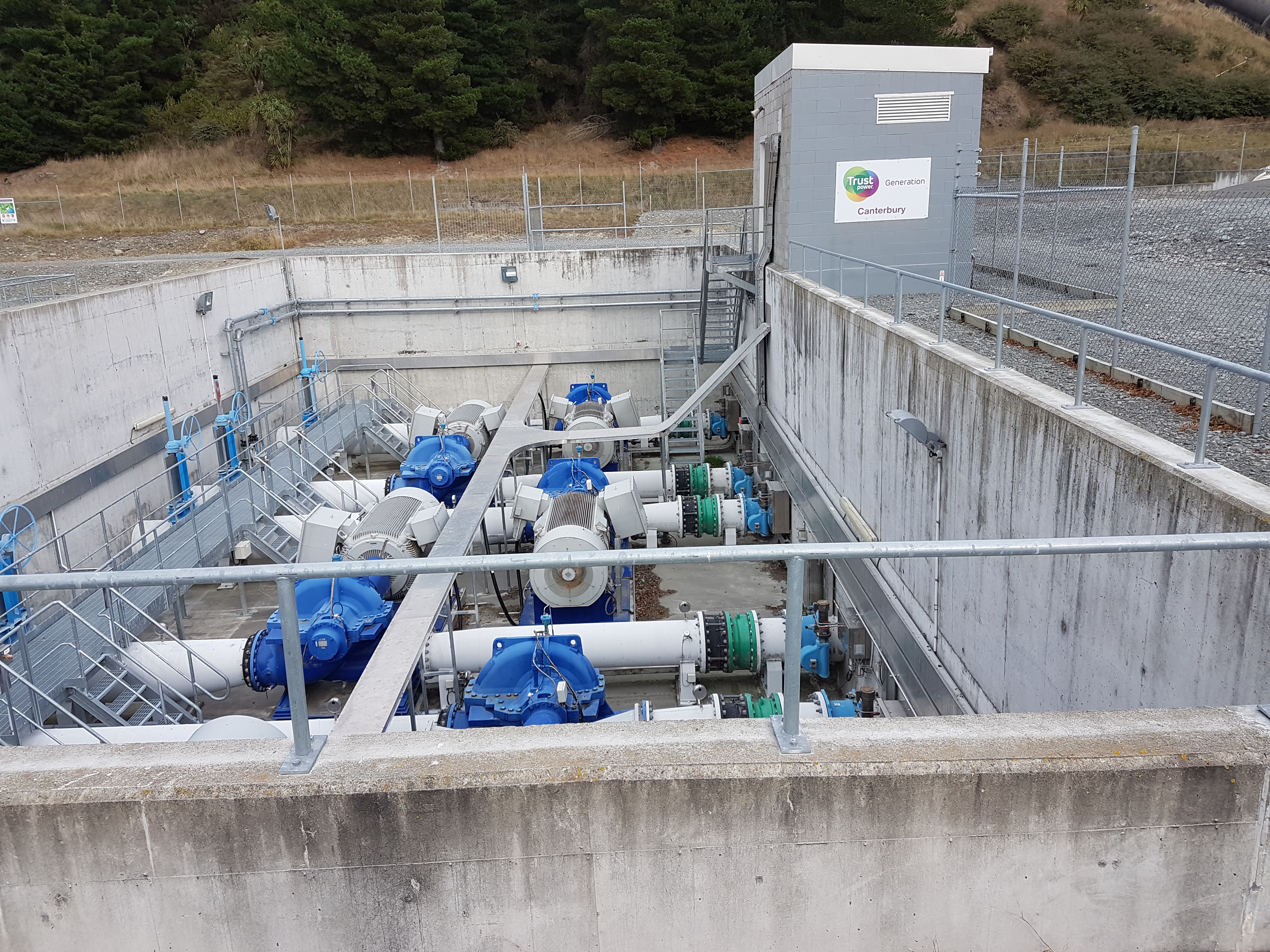
Pumps used to send water from the Rakaia River back up the penstock to the RDR

In 2010, TrustPower (now Manawa Energy) installed a river intake, fish screening, and pumping facilities to deliver the water from the Rakaia River to the RDR using some of the existing Highbank Power Station facilities. The Highbank Power Station site has been equipped with an array of six 1.5 MW pumps that allow it to take water from the Rakaia River and pump it up the power station penstock 104 metres (342 ft) into the RDR. The water is then available for irrigators to use.

TrustPower (now Manawa Energy) generation manager Mike Kedian believed pumping water back through the penstock was a New Zealand first.

Pumping water up hill is not without its challenges, and one of these is the volume and pressure of the water contained in the pipeline when being pumped. In order to protect the penstock from pressure fluctuations an air-chamber has been installed adjacent to the pump station to maintain pipeline pressure within acceptable bounds.

=== Generator and turbine replacement ===
The original generation equipment was replaced in a project that commenced in November 2024 and is expected to be complete in May 2026. The original turbine and its scroll case were removed from the power house and a new 29 MW turbine and generator were installed. Replacement of both generator and turbine enables more efficient generation of electricity using the available water, and is expected to increase output by 8 GWh per year. The project was estimated by Manawa Energy to cost NZ$30.5M. Along with the generator and turbine, other mechanical and electrical equipment on the site was replaced. During the outage for the replacement of the main units, the pump station for the Barrhill-Chertsey irrigation scheme was modified so that when not required for irrigation, the pumps could be used for generation, providing 5.8 MW of generating output.

=== Avoiding out-of-phase synchronisation ===
Generators and their step-up transformers are designed to withstand the internal forces that occur when an electrical short circuit fault occurs close to the power station. However, generators and step-up transformers are still vulnerable to severe damage if a network event causes an out-of-phase synchronisation. Highbank Power Station is potentially exposed to a risk of out-of-phase synchronisation resulting from manual or automatic switching on the 66 kV network. To manage this risk, the historic practice of EA Networks has been to avoid the use of automatic reclose on the 66 kV network, and to ensure that the Highbank generator is disconnected before manually closing circuit breakers. These precautions add complexity to network operations and can delay restoration of circuits after a fault. EA Networks plans to install phasor measurement units (or synchrophasors) on their 66 kV network in 2025 to enable automatic re-closing of 66 kV circuit breakers if the conditions for closure are suitable and will not produce an unacceptable out-of-phase synchronisation.

== See also ==
- National Grid (New Zealand)
- Hydroelectric power in New Zealand
- List of power stations in New Zealand
- Electricity sector in New Zealand
- New Zealand electricity market
