= Talbot Forest Scenic Reserve =

Conservation reserve near Geraldine, New Zealand

- Raukapuka
- Aerial view
- Interactive map of Talbot Forest Scenic Reserve
- Location: Timaru District
- Nearest city: Geraldine
- Coordinates: 44°05′09″S 171°14′20″E
- Area: 26 hectares (64 acres)
- Elevation: 220 m (721.78 ft)
- Created: 1879
- Operator: Department of Conservation

Talbot Forest Scenic Reserve, usually referred to as Talbot Forest, is a public conservation reserve bordering the town of Geraldine, New Zealand. It is the last remnant of the forest that grew in the area at the time of European settlement, and is notable for housing a population of endangered long-tailed bats (Chalinolobus tuberculatus).

== Geography ==
Talbot Forest Scenic Reserve cover 26 hectares (64 acres) on the western edge of the town of Geraldine, South Canterbury, about 130 kilometres (81 mi) south of Christchurch and 34 km (21 mi) north-east of Timaru. Ten minutes' walk from the centre of Geraldine, it is bordered by Hislop Street, Tripp Street, Forest Street, and Davies Street; Totara Street passes through the middle of the reserve, and several walking tracks cross it. The forest sits on the Geraldine Downs overlooking the town, formed of dolerite from the Geraldine lava flow 2.5 million years ago at the beginning of the Pleistocene and topped with wind-blown loess.

== History ==
Talbot Forest is the original European name for the area, renamed in 1857 to Geraldine. The origin of its name is unclear: although the Talbot family were prominent early settlers in the area, John Talbot and his family did not arrive in New Zealand until 1862, and only settled in South Canterbury in 1869.

Tripp Street entrance and reservoir

The Māori name for the forest was Raukapuka, and the forest was known as Raukapuka Bush in the early days of settlement. In 1859 Charles Torlesse estimated that the forest at "Talbots Bush" comprised 2,000 acres (810 ha). When the area was surveyed for settlement by Samuel Hewlings in 1854 he left an area inside the township reserved for native bush. On the recommendation of Hewlings, the Chief Surveyor Thomas Cass in March 1857 suggested 100 acres (40 ha) of bush be reserved from sale for the township site; the remainder of the bush had been sold. Extensive unlicensed timber felling was occurring in the reserved areas, and Cass wrote again in May noting that timber in the reserve was rapidly diminishing, and immediate steps needed to be taken. The issuing of cutting licences was halted in July 1857.

The town site of Geraldine was surveyed into sections in 1862, with Talbot Street as the main street. In its early days, sawmilling and bush felling was an important economic activity for Geraldine. An 1869 survey report noted Raukapuka Bush still covered 928 acres (376 ha), and was valued at £12 an acre. A small 2.5-hectare (6.2-acre) patch of bush was formally reserved in 1879; the largest part of the present-day scenic reserve, 23 hectares (57 acres), was added in 1886, and an additional small portion in 1962. Despite being a reserve, logging and grazing in the bush continued for some years. A concrete reservoir was constructed in the centre of the forest, and belts of exotic trees were planted to screen the effects of road construction.

== Ecology ==
=== Flora ===
Mature tōtara in Talbot Forest

Talbot Forest is the last remnant of the Geraldine area's once-extensive forests, which together with Peel Forest made up over half the forest of South Canterbury at the time of European settlement. An 1869 survey of Raukapuka Bush noted its predominant trees were tōtara (Podocarpus totara), kahikatea (Dacrycarpus dacrydioides), mataī (Prumnopitys taxifolia), and mānuka (Leptospermum scoparium). After the reserve was designated, introduced plants began to invade the forest fringes: broom, blackberry, gorse, sycamore, elm, and wild apple and plum trees. As well as plantings of Pinus radiata, Douglas fir, and macrocarpa around the forest edges, there were occasional attempts to revegetate the reserve with New Zealand species that were not native to the area, such as rangiora, red beech, black beech, Hoheria sexstylosa, and kauri; in 1947 1,200 beech trees from Southland were planted around the reserve, along with tōtara.

The reserve is a mixed podocarp forest with an unusually low rainfall, 750 mm a year, but contains species more typical of temperate rain forests such as kahikatea, hen and chicken fern (Asplenium sp.) and supplejack (Ripogonum scandens). Tōtara and mataī are the dominant forest trees on the hilside, with kahikatea, mataī, and pokaka (Elaeocarpus hookerianus) more common on the lower moister flats. The largest tōtara in the reserve is estimated to be 800 years old. Mahoe (Melicytus ramiflorus, often hybridising with M. micranthus) is a common understorey species, as is narrow-leaved lacebark (Hoheria angustifolia), kaikomako (Pennantia corymbosa) and five-finger (Pseudopanax arboreus). The forest has high species diversity for native bush in South Canterbury, and supports one at-risk species, Brachyglottis sciadophila.

=== Fauna ===
Bird species found in Talbot Forest include grey warblers, bellbirds, fantails, riflemen, and low numbers of kererū. Introduced feral pigeons roost in the forest in large numbers, and the buildup of their droppings can slowly kill their roost trees.

Talbot Forest is home to the South Canterbury population of the critically endangered long-tailed bat / pekapeka-tou-roa (Chalinolobus tuberculatus), one of only two on the East Coast of the South Island—the other is in the Catlins. Approximately 300–400 bats live in the Geraldine area; as well as Talbot Forest, the bats can be found in Peel Forest, the gorges of the Orari, Waihī, Ōpihi, and Kakahu rivers, and in forest remnants near Hanging Rock (where a declining population of 100 is being monitored). In Talbot Forest they roost in cavities in large old tōtara and mataī trees, moving roosts every few days and emerging at dusk to feed along rivers and forest edges. For reproducing, female bats prefer tall, mature trees containing small, well-insulated humid cavities that heat up during the day and maintain their temperature overnight; where such trees are lacking the bats will roost in willows or cabbage trees, but these are less well-insulated and can endanger their pups.

The Department of Conservation has trapped flying bats in harp traps and with the assistance of volunteers glued 6.2-gram (0.22 oz) radio transmitters to their backs for tracking their movements using radio telemetry, to locate their roost trees. An initial five years of monitoring suggested the numbers of the South Canterbury bat population were declining by 9 per cent a year; to prevent predators such as cats, rats, possums, and stoats reaching their roosts, trees were fitted with metal bands. The Talbot Forest Working Group has organised regular summer night bat viewings, attracting over 100 people in 2021 and 170 in 2024. In 2021, the company building a 24-hour petrol station on the flight path of foraging bats between the forest and the Waihī River agreed to install dimmers and reduce lighting so as not to confuse the animals.

== Management ==
The Scenic Reserve is managed by the Department of Conservation, which in 2010 installed picnic tables, parking, lawns, and new native forest planting. The local authority is the Timaru District Council. The volunteer Talbot Forest Working Group was established in 1997 to undertake forest maintenance and control weeds with monthly working bees. Since the discovery of remnant populations of bats in the forest in the late 1990s, the Working Group has installed bat boxes, worked with the Department of Conservation to monitor the bat population, and run regular bat viewings.

== See also ==
- Conservation in New Zealand
