= Inland Scenic Route =

Scenic route in Canterbury, New Zealand

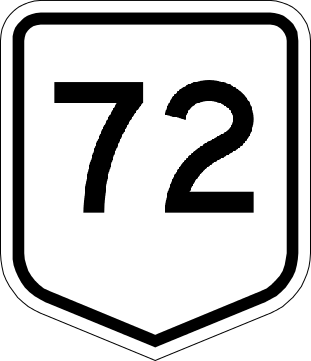
Inland Scenic Route 72
- Route of Inland Scenic Route

Route information
- Length: 223 km (139 mi)

Major junctions
- North end: SH 1 at Amberley
- South end: SH 79 at Geraldine

Location
- Country: New Zealand
- Primary destinations: Rangiora, Cust, Oxford, Waddington, Coalgate, Glentunnel, Windwhistle, Mount Hutt, Alford Forest, Staveley, Mount Somers, Mayfield, Arundel, Orari Bridge

Highway system
- New Zealand state highways; Motorways and expressways; List
← SH 71	→ SH 73

The Inland Scenic Route is a north–south touring route in Canterbury, New Zealand. In the north, the route starts in Amberley and in the south, it ends at Orari Bridge where it meets State Highway 79 (SH 79). It is on the New Zealand Automobile Association's list of 101 things that "Kiwis must do". It is mostly a two lane road, with several one lane bridges throughout the route.

Inland Scenic Route 72 was initially known as State Highway 72, until 1991 when it, along with several other roads were removed from their highway status and handed over to the respective territorial authorities by the NZ Transport Agency (Waka Kotahi) as part of a wider re-alignment of the national highway network to focus on major travel routes.

== History ==
Similar routes to the Inland Scenic Route 72 have been traversed by the Māori people for several centuries prior to European construction of travel routes, evidenced by several Pā surrounding areas such as Temuka and Rangiora being involved in trade with each other and others throughout the Canterbury region, requiring transport corridors further inland.

Early European roads in the area were first developed by local Road boards, with the first meeting of the Oxford Road Board being in January 1864, and similar boards establishing early routes between settlements during the same time frame. Prior to the road boards, residents would have had to apply to the Provincial Council for the formation of a road, and the addition of local bodies streamlined the process significantly.

On 12 March 1976, a collection of these early roads and those developed later by county councils were collectively designated as State Highway 72 by the Ministry of Transportation. The highway followed the identical route as the modern day Inland Scenic Route, aside from the Amberley to Rangiora section, which has been added to the route following its downgrading.

In 1991, State Highway 72 was downgraded from a state highway citing low use, and primarily regional or local traffic using it, which was not the goal of the new State Highway system. It was designated and signposted as Inland Scenic Route 72, a tourist drive.

In the last decade, the route has been promoted by various town tourism boards as well as regional and national entities to drive tourists to experience the rural farming communities of inland Canterbury.

Through the latter half of 2024 and early 2025, support has been mounting among the territorial authorities within which the route lies to request NZTA re-classify the route as a State Highway. Notably, the Waimakariri District Council has raised the issue, and the Ashburton District Council has sent a request to the Minister for Transportation.

== Route ==
Inland Scenic Route 72 begins at the junction with State Highway 1 in Amberley on Carters Road, initially following Markham Street before quickly making a right turn onto Douglas Road. Another left turn is made soon after onto Lawcocks Road. After 2.6 km, the route makes one more left turn, and continues to follow Balcairn Amberley Road until the township of Balcairn. The route then continues straight on what is now called Upper Sefton Road, passing through the towns of Sefton and Ashley.

In Ashley, the route continues straight along Fawcetts Road before making a left turn onto Cones Road to cross the Ashley River, passing the Ashley River Regional Park and entering the major town of Rangiora. The route then veers Left onto Milton Avenue which becomes Ashley Street, and continues through the town centre before making a left onto Blackett Street. Soon after, the route makes another left onto West Belt, and a right onto Oxford Road. The route continues along Oxford Road for 31.24 km, passing through the localities of Fernside, Springbank, and Bennetts, as well as the town of Cust. The route then reaches Oxford where it continues straight onto what becomes Main Street and then Depot Road. It crosses the Eyre River and carries on through farmland, passing the locality of Burnt Hill. The route then crosses the Waimakariri River at the Waimakariri Gorge and continues on Waimakiriri Gorge Road until the junction with State Highway 73 in Waddington.

The route remains in conjunction with State Highway 73 for roughly 1 kilometre before making a right turn onto Deans Road, on which it remains until reaching State Highway 77 near Coalgate. It remains in conjunction with State Highway 77 from Deans Road until the junction with Mclennans Bush and Waimarama Roads. The route then follows the Arundel Rakaia Gorge Road over the Ashburton River, through the settlement of Alford Forest, over Taylors Stream, and through the towns of Staveley, Mount Somers, and Mayfield before crossing over the Rangitata River in Arundel. It also crosses the Rangitata Diversion Race twice over this period. It is then only a short distance along the Geraldine-Arundel Road before the route comes to a junction with State Highway 79 in Orari Bridge. It continues in conjunction with State Highway 79 through Geraldine before continuing straight onto Talbot Road, whereas the State Highway makes a right turn. It then continues straight down the Winchester-Geraldine Road until its terminus in Winchester, at the junction with State Highway 1.

== Major features ==
- The Inland Scenic Route passes over the Rakaia Gorge on the Rakaia Gorge Bridge, a wrought iron single lane bridge constructed between 1880 and 1882. The bridge is one of the oldest wrought iron bridges in the country, and is a "Bollman-truss" bridge, one of only two remaining anywhere in the world. The bridge is 57 metres long, and was initially designed to handle both road and rail, although the inland railway never eventuated.
- The Waimakariri Gorge is also crossed by the route, on an iron girder bridge constructed between 1876 and 1877. The bridge initially served the Oxford to Sheffield branch railway until 1933, and the bridge was shared between trains and road vehicles. It was designed by HP Higginson, a prominent bridge designer who trained in England and had worked in Mauritius, India and Russia before his work in New Zealand. The bridge was constructed by the Christchurch-based contractor William Stocks.
- The route crosses over the Rangitata Diversion Race twice. The Rangitata Diversion Race is a major irrigation diversion providing irrigation for over 75,000 ha of Central Canterbury farmland.
- The Orari Bridge is a one lane bridge over the Orari River which carries both the Inland Scenic Route and State Highway 79. It replaced an older bridge, and was completed in the 1960s. It receives some of the highest traffic of any one lane bridge in the country, with an average daily traffic count of 3,686.

== Major junctions ==
Territorial authority	Location	km	mi	Destinations	Notes
Hurunui District	Amberley	0	0.0	SH 1 north (Carters Road) – Picton; SH 1 south (Carters Road) – Christchurch	Inland Scenic Route begins
Selwyn District	Waddington	77	48	SH 73 (West Coast Road) – Springfield, West Coast, Arthur's Pass	State Highway 73 Northern Concurrency Terminus
Selwyn District	Waddington	78	48	SH 73 (West Coast Road) – Darfield, Christchurch	State Highway 73 Southern Concurrency Terminus
Selwyn District	Coalgate	87	54	SH 77 (Homebush Road) – Darfield, Christchurch	State Highway 77 Eastern Concurrency Terminus
Ashburton District	Methven – Pudding Hill Boundary	129	80	SH 77 (Waimarama Road) – Methven; Mclennans Bush Road – Mt Hutt Ski Area	State Highway 77 Western Concurrency Terminus
Timaru District	Rangitata – Orari Bridge Boundary	195	121	SH 79 (Rangitata-Orari Bridge Highway) – Ashburton, Christchurch	State Highway 79 Northern Concurrency Terminus
Timaru District	Geraldine	201	125	SH 79 (Cox Street) – Fairlie, Aoraki / Mount Cook	State Highway 79 Southern Concurrency Terminus
Timaru District	Winchester	212	132	SH 1 north (Winchester-Orari Highway) – Christchurch; SH 1 south (Temuka-Winchester Highway) – Timaru	Inland Scenic Route Ends
1.000 mi = 1.609 km; 1.000 km = 0.621 mi: Concurrency terminus
