= Hilton, New Zealand =

Locality in Timaru District, Canterbury Region

Hilton
- Locality
- Interactive map of Hilton
- Coordinates: 44°09′S 171°10′E
- Country: New Zealand
- Region: Canterbury
- Territorial authority: Timaru District
- Ward: Geraldine
- Community: Geraldine
- Electorates: Waitaki; Te Tai Tonga (Māori)

Government
  - Territorial authority: Timaru District Council
  - Regional council: Environment Canterbury
  - Mayor of Timaru: Nigel Bowen
  - Waitaki MP: Miles Anderson
  - Te Tai Tonga MP: Tākuta Ferris

Area
  - Total: 23.23 km^{2} (8.97 sq mi)

Population (2023 census)
  - Total: 90
  - Density: 3.9/km^{2} (10/sq mi)

Hilton is a locality in the Canterbury Region of the South Island of New Zealand. It is located about 10 kilometres (6.2 mi) south west of Geraldine and bordered by Gapes Valley and Pleasant Valley to the north, Kakahu Bush to the west and Geraldine Flat to the east. The Kakahu River flows through the area.

== History ==
The area was initially taken up by Captain Richard Westenra in 1853 as part of Kakahu Station. The next decade saw the rise of saw milling in the region and more intensive farming, contributing to rapid growth in the region. By 1876, the settlement consisted of a blacksmith shop, a general store, a barbers shop, a school and a post office.

In 1891, the Hilton Hotel (not to be confused Hilton Hotels & Resorts est. 1919) which was described as a grandiose two-storeyed, 14-roomed hotel, was burnt to the ground when H.D.D Homes deliberately set fire to in an attempt to salvage insurance money. The hotel had fallen on hard times and Homes would later be charged and sentenced to four years penal servitude.

Hilton School was first opened in 1875, in 1924 it was modernised and rebuilt being opened by Thomas Hughes, the original master in 1875. The roll would fluctuate between 90 and 20 children with a notable increase when the nearby Gapes Valley School closed. In 2005 the unpopular decision to close schools in the region, including Hilton School, was made by then-Education Minister, Labour's Trevor Mallard.

The Hilton Hall was officially opened in October 1916. It is still used today for community events, including the annual Christmas function and is maintained by a committee. Otherwise Hilton Community members generally rely on the nearby town of Geraldine.

== Demographics ==
Hilton locality covers 23.23 km^{2} (8.97 sq mi). It is part of the Arundel statistical area.

Historical population
| Year | Pop. | ±% p.a. |
|---|---|---|
| 2006 | 93 | — |
| 2013 | 93 | +0.00% |
| 2018 | 96 | +0.64% |
| 2023 | 90 | −1.28% |

Hilton had a population of 90 in the 2023 New Zealand census, a decrease of 6 people (−6.2%) since the 2018 census, and a decrease of 3 people (−3.2%) since the 2013 census. There were 45 males, 48 females, and 3 people of other genders in 39 dwellings. 3.3% of people identified as LGBTIQ+. The median age was 48.4 years (compared with 38.1 years nationally). There were 9 people (10.0%) aged under 15 years, 18 (20.0%) aged 15 to 29, 42 (46.7%) aged 30 to 64, and 21 (23.3%) aged 65 or older.

People could identify as more than one ethnicity. The results were 96.7% European (Pākehā), 3.3% Māori, 3.3% Asian, and 6.7% other, which includes people giving their ethnicity as "New Zealander". English was spoken by 96.7%, Māori by 3.3%, and other languages by 13.3%. No language could be spoken by 3.3% (e.g. too young to talk). The percentage of people born overseas was 16.7, compared with 28.8% nationally.

The sole religious affiliation given was 30.0% Christian. People who answered that they had no religion were 53.3%, and 13.3% of people did not answer the census question.

Of those at least 15 years old, 18 (22.2%) people had a bachelor's or higher degree, 51 (63.0%) had a post-high school certificate or diploma, and 15 (18.5%) people exclusively held high school qualifications. The median income was $49,000, compared with $41,500 nationally. 9 people (11.1%) earned over $100,000 compared to 12.1% nationally. The employment status of those at least 15 was 42 (51.9%) full-time, 18 (22.2%) part-time, and 3 (3.7%) unemployed.

== Notable people ==
- Jeremiah Connolly (1875–1935), Member of Parliament for Mid-Canterbury
- Walter Scott (1902–1985), notable New Zealand teacher, lecturer, educationalist, teachers' college principal and civil libertarian

== Economy ==
The local economy is predominantly driven by farming, and two limestone quarries also operate in the area.
