= Orari Bridge =

Locality in Timaru District, New Zealand

- Locality
- Interactive map of Orari Bridge
- Coordinates: 44.047°S 171.263°E
- Country: New Zealand
- Region: Canterbury
- Territorial authority: Timaru District
- Ward: Geraldine
- Community: Geraldine
- Electorates: Waitaki; Te Tai Tonga (Māori)

Government
  - Territorial authority: Timaru District Council
  - Regional council: Environment Canterbury
  - Mayor of Timaru: Nigel Bowen
  - Waitaki MP: Miles Anderson
  - Te Tai Tonga MP: Tākuta Ferris

Area
  - Total: 21.02 km^{2} (8.12 sq mi)

Population (2023 census)
  - Total: 192
  - Density: 9.13/km^{2} (23.7/sq mi)

Orari Bridge is a small settlement north of Geraldine, New Zealand on the south side of the Orari River. The Orari Bridge is located several kilometers upstream of the township of Orari on State Highway 79. Where the road crosses the river there is a one-laned bridge which is often subject to congestion. The Geraldine Community Board has appealed for the bridge to be converted from a one lane bridge to a two lane to minimize congestion and improve safety. The New Zealand Transport Agency has yet to commit funds to enable this to happen. In December 2019, calls continue for the bridge to be converged to a two lane bridge urgently. Two people sustained moderate injuries in a crash on the bridge in July 2020. The National Party in September 2020 said that they would commit to converted the Orari Bridge to a two lane structure.

A nearby popular mountain bike track meets the bridge at Orari Bridge.

== Demographics ==
Orari Bridge locality covers 21.02 km^{2} (8.12 sq mi). It is part of the Arundel statistical area.

Historical population
Year	Pop.	±% p.a.
2006	150	—
2013	174	+2.14%
2018	171	−0.35%
2023	192	+2.34%

Orari Bridge had a population of 192 in the 2023 New Zealand census, an increase of 21 people (12.3%) since the 2018 census, and an increase of 18 people (10.3%) since the 2013 census. There were 105 males and 90 females in 72 dwellings. The median age was 50.8 years (compared with 38.1 years nationally). There were 33 people (17.2%) aged under 15 years, 27 (14.1%) aged 15 to 29, 81 (42.2%) aged 30 to 64, and 48 (25.0%) aged 65 or older.

People could identify as more than one ethnicity. The results were 95.3% European (Pākehā), 9.4% Māori, and 3.1% other, which includes people giving their ethnicity as "New Zealander". English was spoken by 100.0%, Māori by 3.1%, and other languages by 1.6%. New Zealand Sign Language was known by 1.6%. The percentage of people born overseas was 14.1, compared with 28.8% nationally.

The sole religious affiliation given was 34.4% Christian. People who answered that they had no religion were 59.4%, and 9.4% of people did not answer the census question.

Of those at least 15 years old, 36 (22.6%) people had a bachelor's or higher degree, 87 (54.7%) had a post-high school certificate or diploma, and 42 (26.4%) people exclusively held high school qualifications. The median income was $34,500, compared with $41,500 nationally. 9 people (5.7%) earned over $100,000 compared to 12.1% nationally. The employment status of those at least 15 was 78 (49.1%) full-time, 24 (15.1%) part-time, and 6 (3.8%) unemployed.

== Buildings ==
=== Orari Bridge School ===
The Orari Bridge School was opened in 1881 using half of the remaining building from the nearby closed Waihi Bush School. The school was burned down in 1905 but rebuilt. The school closed permanently in 1996. It is now home to a holiday park.

=== Orari Bridge Hall ===
The light green Orari Bridge Hall was a notable landmark for motorists driving on State Highway 79. The hall was constructed in 1922 to serve the various needs of the community. The hall was put up for sale in 2009 and a recently constructed private residence is now situated on the halls previous location.
