= Hae Hae Te Moana River =

River in New Zealand

Coordinates: 44°01′41″S 171°07′51″E

- Location of the mouth within New Zealand

Location
- Country: New Zealand

Physical characteristics
- Source
  - location: Southern Alps
- Mouth
  - location: Ōpihi River

The Hae Hae Te Moana River is a river in the Canterbury region of New Zealand. It originates in the Four Peaks Range of the Southern Alps, with a North Branch and South Branch merging to the north of Pleasant Valley. The river runs south-east to join the Waihī River near Winchester. The combined river is called the Temuka River, which flows past Temuka to join the Ōpihi River shortly before it runs into the Canterbury Bight.

== See also ==
- List of rivers of New Zealand
