= Kakahu =

- Locality
- Interactive map of Kakahu
- Country: New Zealand
- Region: Canterbury
- Territorial authority: Timaru District
- Ward: Geraldine
- Community: Geraldine
- Electorates: Waitaki; Te Tai Tonga (Māori)

Government
  - Territorial authority: Timaru District Council
  - Regional council: Environment Canterbury
  - Mayor of Timaru: Nigel Bowen
  - Waitaki MP: Miles Anderson
  - Te Tai Tonga MP: Tākuta Ferris

Area
  - Total: 188.20 km^{2} (72.66 sq mi)

Population (2023 census)
  - Total: 237
  - Density: 1.26/km^{2} (3.26/sq mi)

Kakahu is a locality in the Canterbury region in the South Island of New Zealand. It is located about 22 kilometers (13.6 mi) west of Geraldine. It is well known for its rich historical and geological history.

== History ==
Kakahu Station run was taken up in 1853. The area was milled for timber in the early years before the focus changed to the rich mineral landscape in the area this included lime and marble. The area was home to numerous lime kilns and quarries over the years including the still intact Hall Road Kiln. A post office and two schools were constructed in the area. Kakahu School was opened in 1875 but was renamed in Hilton School in 1884 when the nearby Kakahu Bush School was opened. Kakahu Bush School was consolidated with Pleasant Point School in 1938. In 1910, St Aidan's Anglican Church was constructed which would remain open up until 1964 when diminishing numbers saw the building relocated to Marchwiel.

== Demographics ==
Kakahu locality covers 188.20 km^{2} (72.66 sq mi). It is part of the Arundel statistical area.

Historical population
Year	Pop.	±% p.a.
2006	210	—
2013	246	+2.29%
2018	237	−0.74%
2023	237	+0.00%

Kakahu had a population of 237 in the 2023 New Zealand census, unchanged since the 2018 census, and a decrease of 9 people (−3.7%) since the 2013 census. There were 114 males and 120 females in 99 dwellings. 2.5% of people identified as LGBTIQ+. There were 45 people (19.0%) aged under 15 years, 42 (17.7%) aged 15 to 29, 123 (51.9%) aged 30 to 64, and 24 (10.1%) aged 65 or older.

People could identify as more than one ethnicity. The results were 92.4% European (Pākehā); 3.8% Māori; 2.5% Asian; 2.5% Middle Eastern, Latin American and African New Zealanders (MELAA); and 5.1% other, which includes people giving their ethnicity as "New Zealander". English was spoken by 97.5%, Māori by 2.5%, and other languages by 6.3%. No language could be spoken by 2.5% (e.g. too young to talk). The percentage of people born overseas was 11.4, compared with 28.8% nationally.

Religious affiliations were 27.8% Christian, and 1.3% Buddhist. People who answered that they had no religion were 60.8%, and 10.1% of people did not answer the census question.

Of those at least 15 years old, 42 (21.9%) people had a bachelor's or higher degree, 114 (59.4%) had a post-high school certificate or diploma, and 36 (18.8%) people exclusively held high school qualifications. 21 people (10.9%) earned over $100,000 compared to 12.1% nationally. The employment status of those at least 15 was 114 (59.4%) full-time, 42 (21.9%) part-time, and 3 (1.6%) unemployed.

== Notable landmarks ==
=== Kakahu Lime Kiln ===
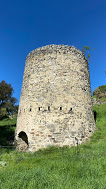
Hall Road Kiln

The Hall Road Kiln, the remaining kiln in the area was built in 1876 for or by Alexander Fergusson. The kiln can be seen from the road and is where the Kakahu Bush track commences. The kiln was used intermittently until the end of the twentieth century.

=== Kakahu Bush ===
Kakahu Bush is a large area of native bush in the Kakahu area. Within the bush a walking track follows the remains of an old tramway which brought marble chips down from the quarries through the gorge. The track then passes through an opening where a number of English trees were planted in 1900 for a planned sanitarium for tuberculosis patients. The bush is well known for its native bush and wildlife, as well as its unique geological features.

=== Escarpment ===
Across the road from the Kakahu Bush car park is an impressive limestone escarpment with cultural and geological significance.
