= Orari =

Orari may refer to:

- Orari, New Zealand
- Orari River, a river in New Zealand
- Organisasi Amatir Radio Indonesia (ORARI), in English, Amateur Radio Organization of Indonesia
