= Pleasant Valley, New Zealand =

Locality in Timaru District, New Zealand

Pleasant Valley
- Locality
- Interactive map of Pleasant Valley
- Coordinates: 44°05′S 171°11′E
- Country: New Zealand
- Region: Canterbury
- Territorial authority: Timaru District
- Ward: Geraldine
- Community: Geraldine
- Electorates: Waitaki; Te Tai Tonga (Māori)

Government
  - Territorial authority: Timaru District Council
  - Regional council: Environment Canterbury
  - Mayor of Timaru: Nigel Bowen
  - Waitaki MP: Miles Anderson
  - Te Tai Tonga MP: Tākuta Ferris

Area
  - Total: 20.29 km^{2} (7.83 sq mi)

Population (2023 census)
  - Total: 138
  - Density: 6.80/km^{2} (17.6/sq mi)

Pleasant Valley is a small locality near the town of Geraldine in the Canterbury Region of the South Island of New Zealand. The area is bordered by the Geraldine Downs to the north and Gapes Valley to the south. The Hae Hae Te Moana River runs through the valley.

== History ==
Originally Pleasant Valley was part of the Raukapuka estate, farmed by Alfred Cox. The region grew with the rise of the timber industry and was up until the 1880s larger than nearby Geraldine. In its heyday the valley was home to a blacksmith, innkeepers, a joiner and merchants amongst others, all of which have long left. The school was original built in 1875 though moved, then destroyed by flood in 1868 and celebrated 85 years in 1960. The school still stands today. The area was also held a number of horse races.

The Pleasant Valley Hall was built in 1922.

== Demographics ==
Pleasant Valley locality covers 20.29 km^{2} (7.83 sq mi). It is part of the Arundel statistical area.

Historical population
Year	Pop.	±% p.a.
2006	93	—
2013	132	+5.13%
2018	132	+0.00%
2023	138	+0.89%

Pleasant Valley had a population of 138 in the 2023 New Zealand census, an increase of 6 people (4.5%) since the 2018 census, and an increase of 6 people (4.5%) since the 2013 census. There were 75 males, 60 females, and 3 people of other genders in 57 dwellings. 6.5% of people identified as LGBTIQ+. The median age was 54.4 years (compared with 38.1 years nationally). There were 18 people (13.0%) aged under 15 years, 15 (10.9%) aged 15 to 29, 81 (58.7%) aged 30 to 64, and 27 (19.6%) aged 65 or older.

People could identify as more than one ethnicity. The results were 93.5% European (Pākehā), 2.2% Māori, 2.2% Asian, and 8.7% other, which includes people giving their ethnicity as "New Zealander". English was spoken by 100.0%, and other languages by 6.5%. The percentage of people born overseas was 15.2, compared with 28.8% nationally.

Religious affiliations were 30.4% Christian, and 2.2% Hindu. People who answered that they had no religion were 58.7%, and 6.5% of people did not answer the census question.

Of those at least 15 years old, 30 (25.0%) people had a bachelor's or higher degree, 66 (55.0%) had a post-high school certificate or diploma, and 18 (15.0%) people exclusively held high school qualifications. The median income was $52,900, compared with $41,500 nationally. 15 people (12.5%) earned over $100,000 compared to 12.1% nationally. The employment status of those at least 15 was 66 (55.0%) full-time and 27 (22.5%) part-time.

== Notable landmarks ==
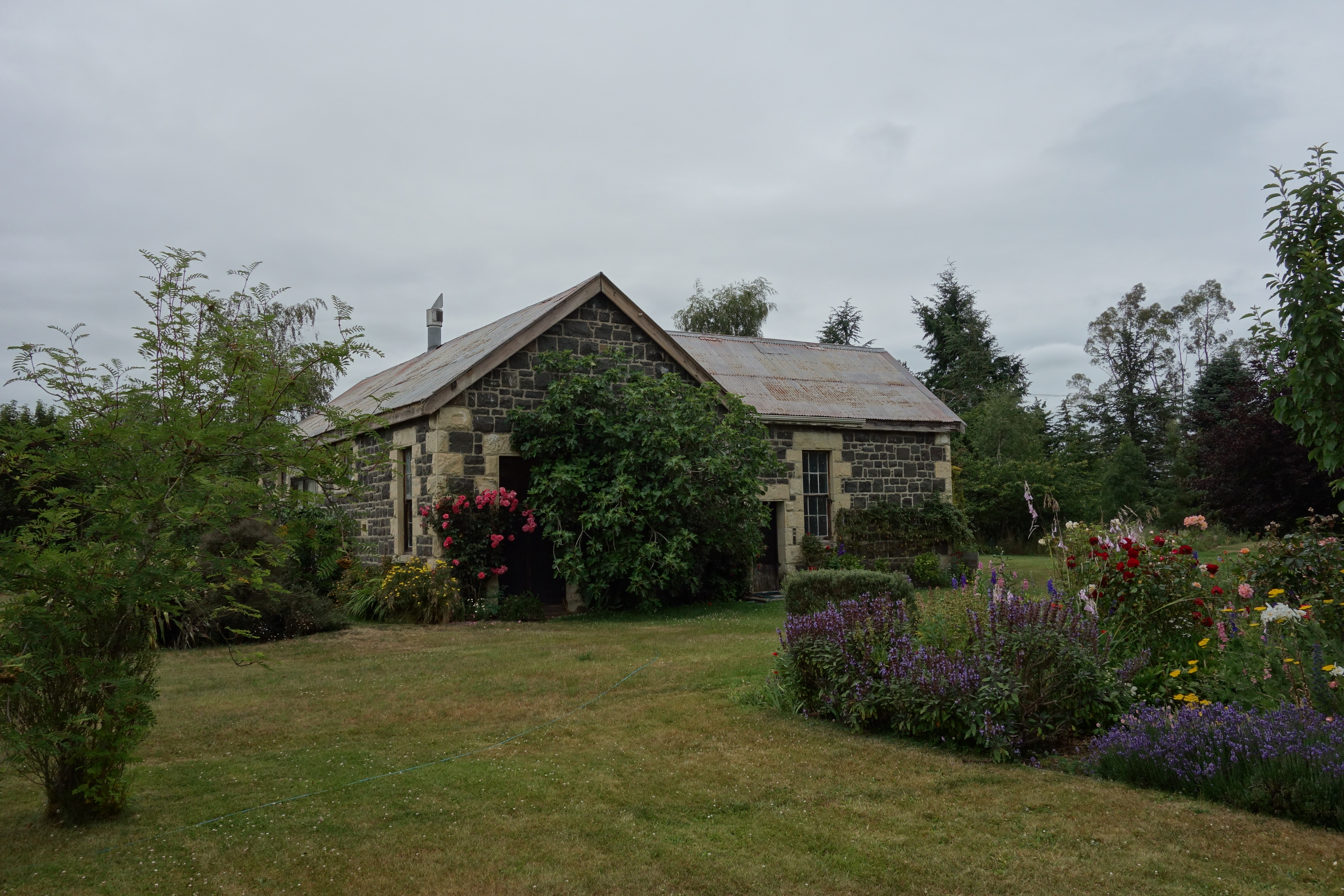
Former butter factory

The Geraldine Cheese, Butter and Bacon Factory, built in 1884, is the oldest existing dairy factory in New Zealand. The factory was closed but subsequently reopened several times finally ceasing production in 1959 as the Geraldine Co-operative Dairy Company. The factory still stands today as a Heritage New Zealand (NZHPT) Category II Heritage Building on private land.

St. Anne's Church, built in 1863, is the oldest church in South Canterbury and one of the oldest in the Anglican Diocese of Christchurch. The church which was constructed with local timber is listed as a NZHPT Category II Heritage Building, and includes a stained glass window made by Veronica Whall. Church services are still held at the church and it celebrated its 150th anniversary in 2013.

== Economy ==
The local economy these days is driven by farming in the region. There is also a well-established daffodil farm, and local fruit producers Barkers.
