= Blandswood, New Zealand =

Small settlement in South Canterbury

Coordinates: 43.899°S 171.228°E

Blandswood is small settlement in the South Canterbury region. It is near the town of Peel Forest. Various popular walking tracks including Rata Falls and Little Mount Peel in the Peel Forest Park Scenic Reserve begin in Blandswood.

== History ==
=== 1975 Flood ===
Following an extremely large and localised period of rainfall, floodwaters and debris breached the banks of the nearby Kowhai River. This flowed through the settlement, taking the lives of four children who were staying at a nearby holiday home.
