= State Highway 79 (New Zealand) =

Road in New Zealand

State Highway 79

Route information
- Maintained by NZ Transport Agency
- Length: 61.0 km (37.9 mi)

Major junctions
- East end: SH 1 (Orari-Rangitata Highway) at Rangitata
- West end: SH 8 (Main Street/Mount Cook Road) at Fairlie

Location
- Country: New Zealand
- Primary destinations: Geraldine

Highway system
- New Zealand state highways; Motorways and expressways; List
← SH 78	→ SH 80

State Highway 79 (SH 79) is a New Zealand state highway connecting the South Canterbury communities of Rangitata, Geraldine, and Fairlie. Starting at State Highway 1 the highway is 61 kilometres in length and runs in a general east–west direction. 6.3 km of the highway through Geraldine runs concurrently with the Inland Scenic Route, formerly State Highway 72. The road is a two-lane single carriageway, with a one-lane bridge crossing the Orari River.

It is an important tourist highway, and forms part of the most direct route between Christchurch and the Mackenzie Country, Aoraki / Mount Cook and Queenstown/Wānaka.

== Route ==
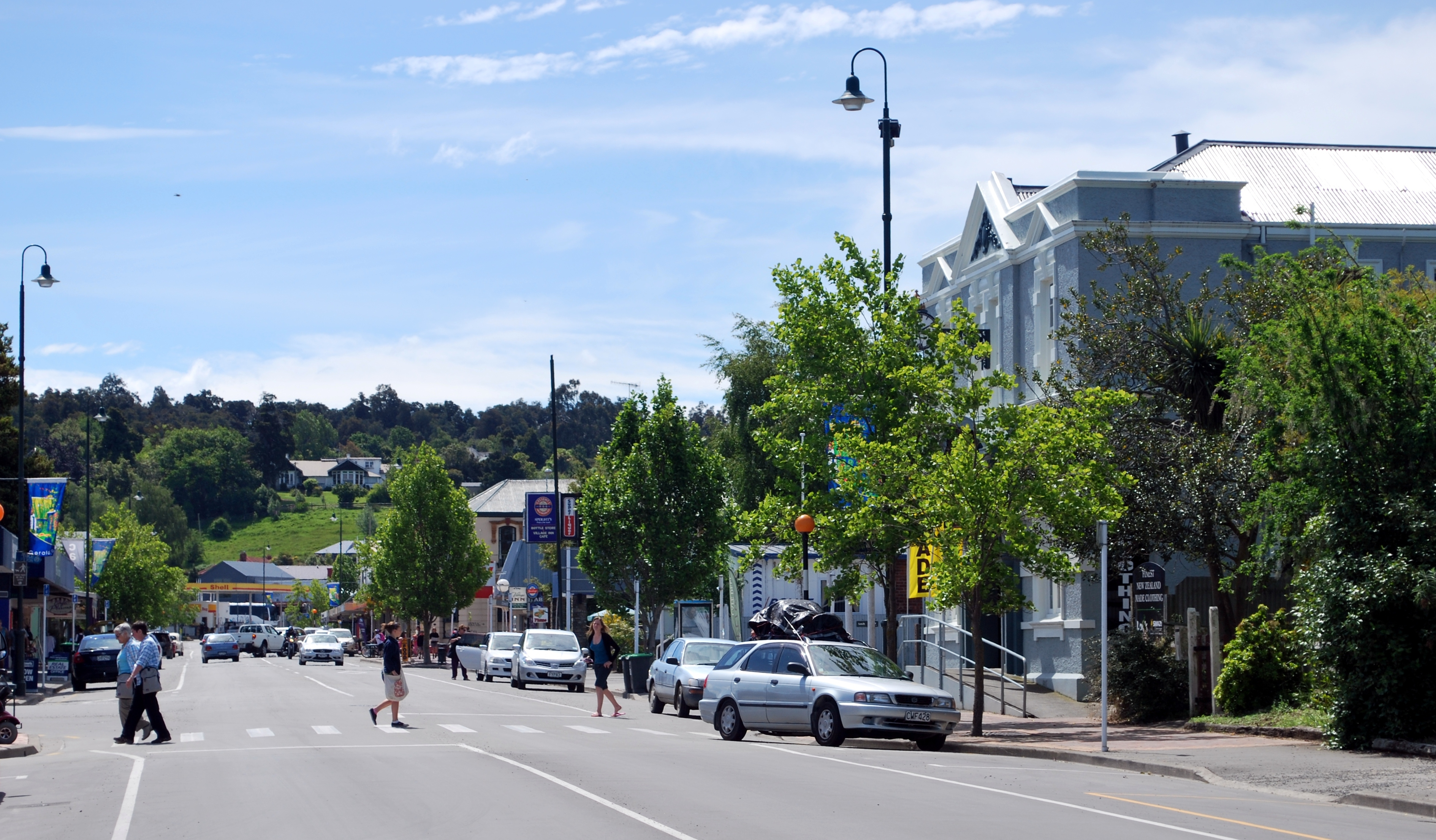
SH 79 passing through Geraldine

The highway starts on the Canterbury Plains and proceeds in a north-westerly direction. The highway then intersects with the Inland Scenic Route and crosses the Orari River. The highway then veers to the south and arrives in Geraldine. In the town centre, SH 79 turns right and passes through the southern sections of the township before veering to the west towards the foothills. The road gradually passes through sections of pine forest and farmlands and is generally hilly and curvy in some spots before descending into the township of Fairlie.

== Major intersections ==
Territorial authority	Location	km	jct	Destinations	Notes
Timaru District	Rangitata	0		SH 1 north – Ashburton, Christchurch; SH 1 south – Temuka, Timaru	SH 79 begins
Timaru District	Rangitata	9		Inland Scenic Route (Geraldine-Arundel Road) – Methven, Mount Hutt Ski Area	SH 79/Inland Scenic Route (Regional Route 72) concurrency begins
Timaru District	Rangitata	9		Orari River	
Timaru District	Geraldine	15		Inland Scenic Route (Talbot Street) – Winchester, Timaru	SH 79/Inland Scenic Route (Regional Route 72) concurrency ends
Mackenzie District	Fairlie	61		SH 8 east – Timaru; SH 8 west – Tekapo, Aoraki / Mount Cook	SH 79 ends

== See also ==
- List of New Zealand state highways
