= Rangitata (hamlet) =

New Zealand locality

- Rural area
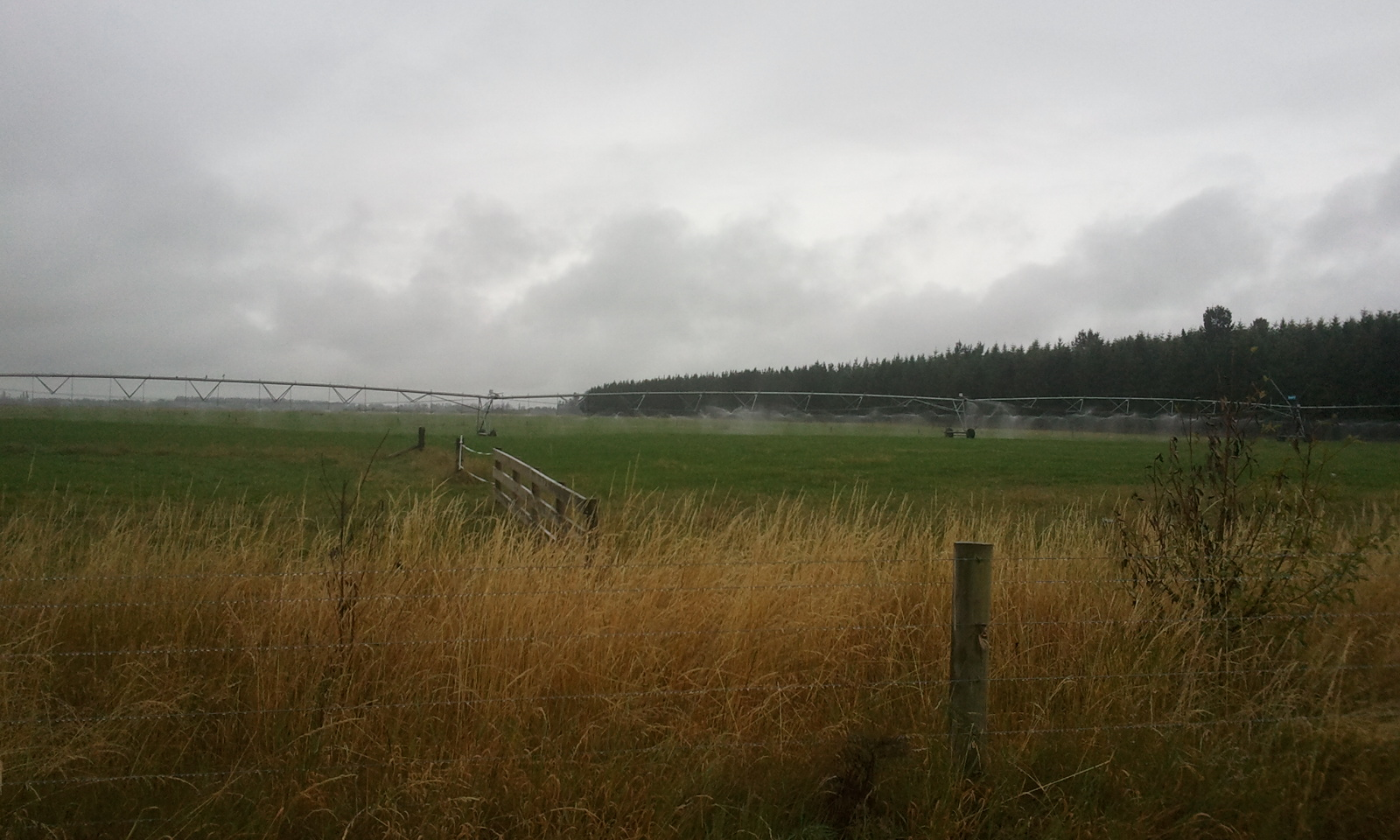
- Rangitata countryside
- Interactive map of Rangitata
- Coordinates: 44.067°S 171.371°E
- Country: New Zealand
- Region: Canterbury
- Territorial authority: Timaru District
- Ward: Geraldine
- Community: Geraldine
- Electorates: Waitaki; Rangitata; Te Tai Tonga (Māori)

Government
  - Territorial authority: Timaru District Council
  - Regional council: Environment Canterbury
  - Mayor of Timaru: Nigel Bowen
  - Waitaki MP/Rangitata MP: Miles Anderson/James Meager
  - Te Tai Tonga MP: Tākuta Ferris
- Time zone: UTC+12 (NZST)
  - Summer (DST): UTC+13 (NZDT)
- Postcode: 7992
- Area code: 03

Rangitata is a settlement in New Zealand. It is located at the junction of State Highway 1 and State Highway 79. The Rangitata River is located 3 kilometres north of the settlement, which in turn is 10 kilometres northeast of Orari.

== Demographics ==
The Rangitata statistical area, which includes Orari and surrounds but does not include Geraldine, covers 171.84 km^{2} (66.35 sq mi) and had an estimated population of 1,740 as of June 2025, with a population density of 10.1 people per km^{2}.

Historical population for the statistical area
Year	Pop.	±% p.a.
2006	1,221	—
2013	1,452	+2.51%
2018	1,476	+0.33%
2023	1,644	+2.18%
The 2006 population is for a larger area of 172.13 km^{2}. Source:

Rangitata statistical area had a population of 1,644 in the 2023 New Zealand census, an increase of 168 people (11.4%) since the 2018 census, and an increase of 192 people (13.2%) since the 2013 census. There were 858 males, 780 females, and 3 people of other genders in 654 dwellings. 1.3% of people identified as LGBTIQ+. The median age was 46.6 years (compared with 38.1 years nationally). There were 309 people (18.8%) aged under 15 years, 174 (10.6%) aged 15 to 29, 789 (48.0%) aged 30 to 64, and 372 (22.6%) aged 65 or older.

People could identify as more than one ethnicity. The results were 89.4% European (Pākehā); 5.7% Māori; 0.7% Pasifika; 6.4% Asian; 3.1% Middle Eastern, Latin American and African New Zealanders (MELAA); and 1.6% other, which includes people giving their ethnicity as "New Zealander". English was spoken by 97.6%, Māori by 1.3%, and other languages by 8.9%. No language could be spoken by 1.6% (e.g. too young to talk). The percentage of people born overseas was 19.2, compared with 28.8% nationally.

Religious affiliations were 37.6% Christian, 0.2% Buddhist, 0.2% New Age, and 1.5% other religions. People who answered that they had no religion were 53.5%, and 6.9% of people did not answer the census question.

Of those at least 15 years old, 276 (20.7%) people had a bachelor's or higher degree, 744 (55.7%) had a post-high school certificate or diploma, and 312 (23.4%) people exclusively held high school qualifications. The median income was $44,100, compared with $41,500 nationally. 144 people (10.8%) earned over $100,000 compared to 12.1% nationally. The employment status of those at least 15 was 675 (50.6%) full-time, 228 (17.1%) part-time, and 12 (0.9%) unemployed.
