= Odey =

Odey is a surname. Notable people include:

- Crispin Odey (born 1959), British billionaire hedge fund manager
- Damon Odey (born 1971), New Zealand politician
- George Odey (1900–1985), British politician
- John Odey (born 1959), Nigerian politician
- Stephen Odey (born 1998), Nigerian footballer
