= Walter Scott (educationalist) =

New Zealand educationist

Walter James Scott CBE (23 December 1902 – 19 February 1985) was a notable New Zealand teacher, lecturer, educationalist, teachers’ college principal and civil libertarian. He was born in Hilton, South Canterbury, New Zealand in 1902.

On 27 December 1928, Scott married Hectorina Jessie MacDonald at St Paul's Presbyterian Church, Invercargill. They had four children during their marriage.

In the 1974 Queen's Birthday Honours, Scott was appointed a Commander of the Order of the British Empire, for services to education and civil liberties.
