= Robert Macintosh =

New Zealand-born British academic

Sir Robert Macintosh
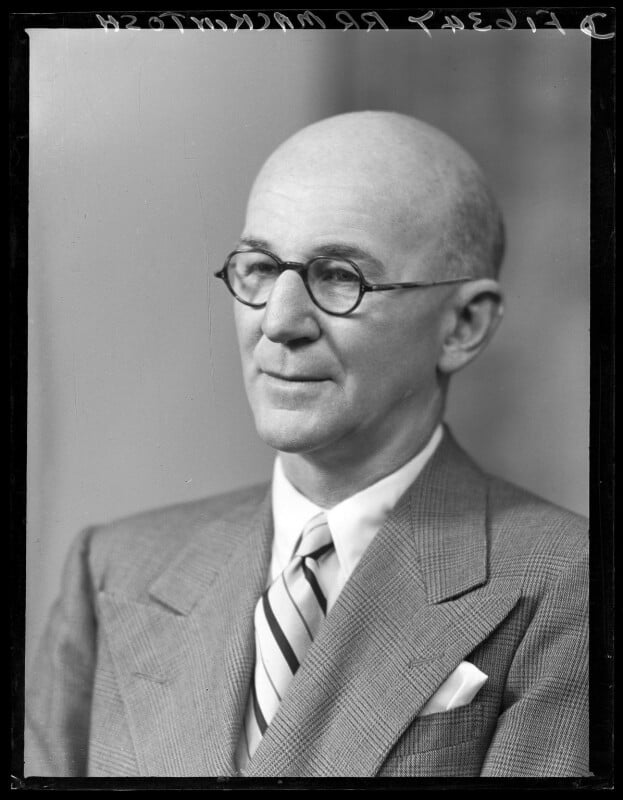
- Macintosh in 1953
- Born: Robert Reynolds Macintosh; 17 October 1897; Timaru, New Zealand
- Died: 28 August 1989 (aged 91); Oxford, England
- Other names: Rewi Rawhiti (Maori)
- Education: Waitaki Boys' High School, Guy's Hospital Medical School
- Occupation: anaesthetist
- Known for: professor of anaesthetics at University of Oxford, first professor of anaesthetics outside the United States
- Notable work: designed equipment that bears his name: a laryngoscope, an anaesthetic vaporiser, spray and endobronchial tube
- Spouse: Dorothy Manning
- Father: Charles Nicholson Macintosh
- Awards: knighted in 1955

Sir Robert Reynolds Macintosh (17 October 1897 – 28 August 1989) was a New Zealand-born British anaesthetist. He was the first professor of anaesthetics outside the United States.

== Early life ==
Macintosh was born 17 October 1897 in Timaru, New Zealand and baptised with the Māori name Rewi Rawhiti. He was the youngest son of Charles Nicholson Macintosh, newspaper editor and mayor of Timaru in 1901, and his wife, Lydia Beatrice Thompson. He spent part of his childhood in Argentina, but returned to New Zealand when he was thirteen years old. He was educated at Waitaki Boys' High School, where he was head of school and excelled academically and athletically.

In December 1915, he travelled to Britain and was commissioned in the Royal Scots Fusiliers, soon transferring to the Royal Flying Corps. He was shot down behind enemy lines on 26 May 1917 and taken prisoner, escaping several times.

== Medical ==
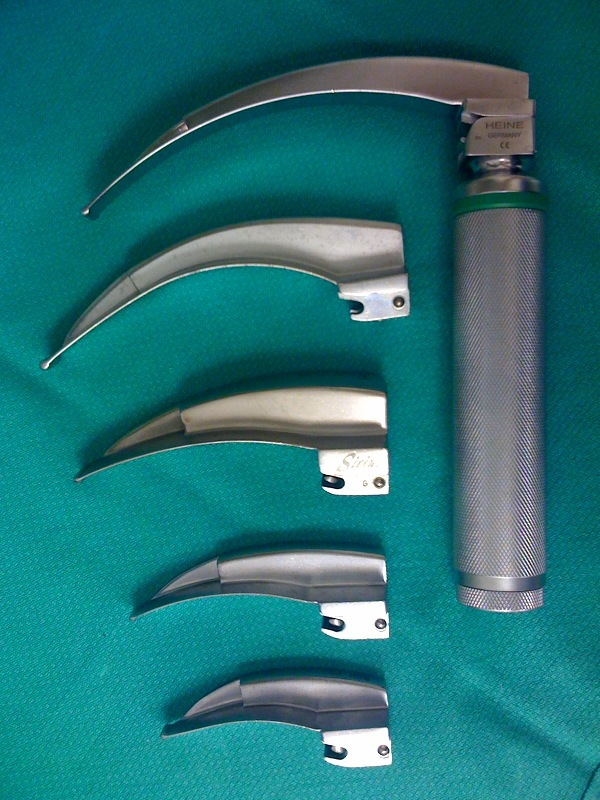
Laryngoscope handle with an assortment of Macintosh blades(large adult, small adult, pediatric, infant, and neonate)

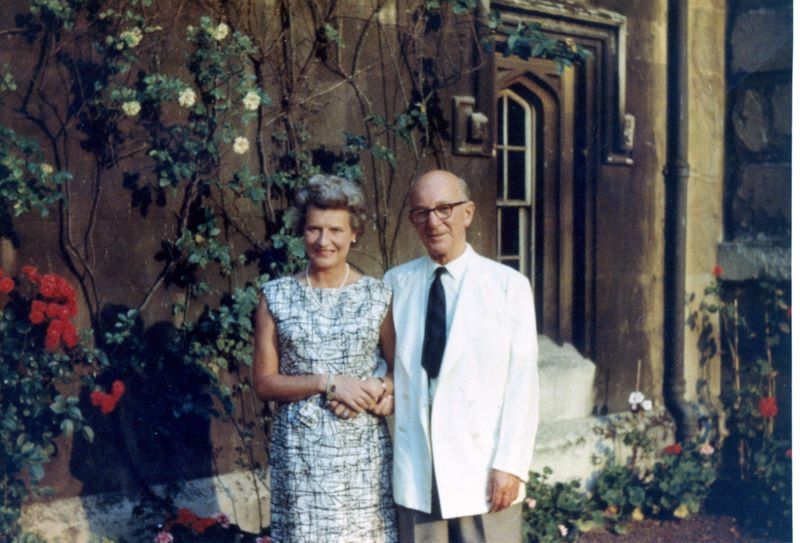
Sir Robert Reynolds Macintosh & his wife Dorothy (née Manning)

After the war, Macintosh trained at Guy's Hospital Medical School, qualifying MRCS LRCP in 1924 and FRCS Ed in 1927. While studying surgery, he earned a living by giving dental anaesthetics and developed an interest in anaesthetics.

In 1936, the University of Oxford approached Lord Nuffield to consider endowing three chairs in medicine, surgery, and obstetrics and gynaecology. Nuffield, who had received an anaesthetic from Macintosh, agreed, but against the university's wishes, insisted on the addition of a chair in anaesthetics, to be held by Macintosh. They could not ignore the £2 million on offer and Macintosh took up his appointment in February 1937, the first professor of anaesthetics outside America.

In the Second World War, Macintosh held the rank of Air Commodore and trained anaesthetists for the armed services. His research included hazardous experiments to test life jackets (immersing Edgar Alexander Pask in a wave tank while anaesthetised), the provision of respirable atmospheres in submarines and survival during parachute descent from high altitudes.

Macintosh designed equipment that now bears his name: a laryngoscope, an anaesthetic vaporiser, spray and endobronchial tube. The laryngoscope he designed in 1941 remains the most-used today. It was developed from a Boyle-Davis mouth gag, used for tonsillectomy. Macintosh noted that this mouth gag indirectly elevated the epiglottis and exposed the laryngeal aperture.

Macintosh studied unexplained deaths that occurred under anaesthesia and established a training programme. He travelled widely, giving demonstrations of "safe and simple" anaesthesia.

Macintosh married Dorothy Manning, whose sister Mary, was married to Archie Forbes.

== Honours ==
Macintosh was knighted in 1955, and received many honorary doctorates and fellowships.

== See also ==
- History of general anesthesia
- History of tracheal intubation
- Laryngoscopy
- Tracheal intubation
