= Balcairn =

Setttlement in Canterbury, New Zealand

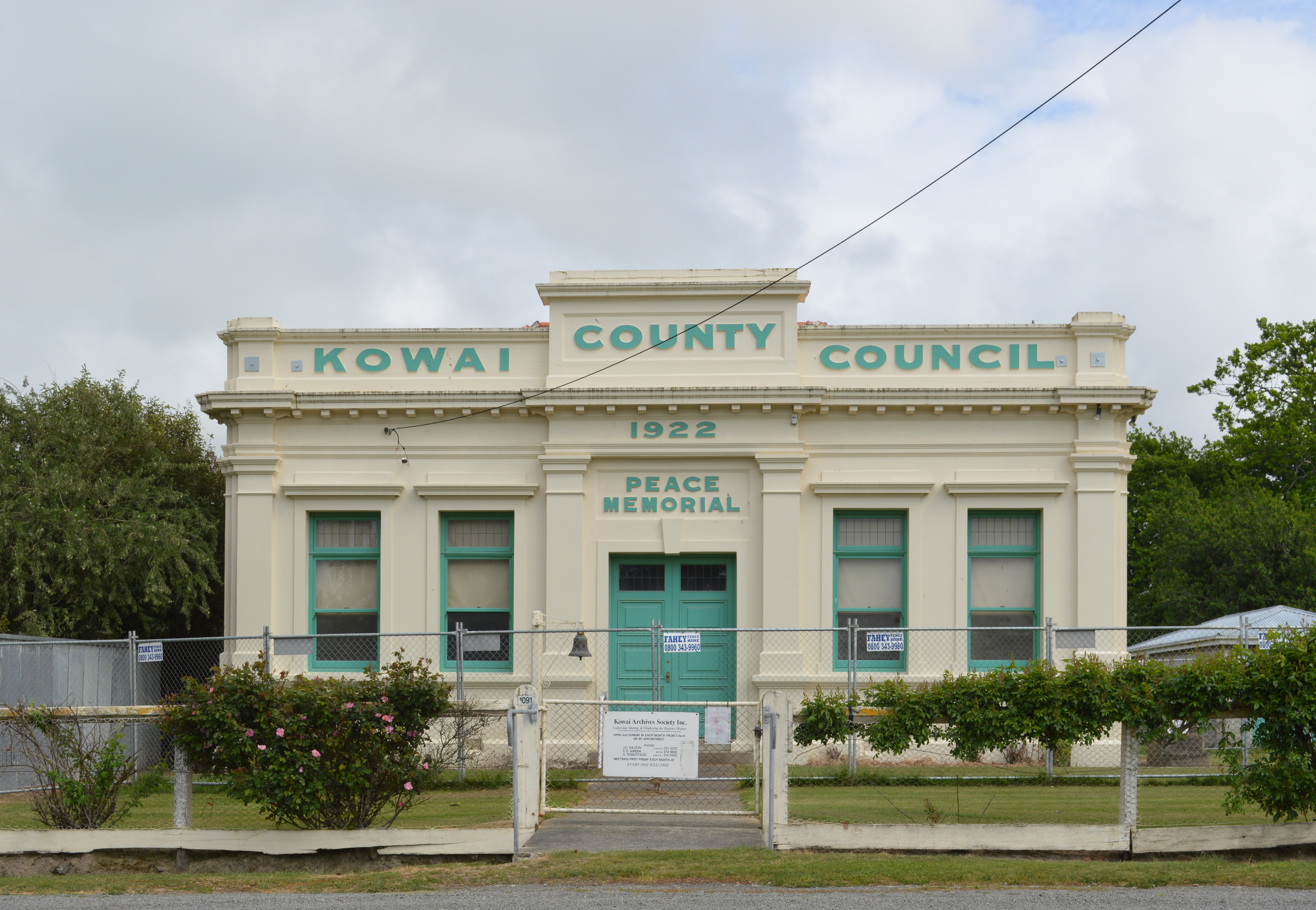
- Kowai County Council Building in 2013
- Interactive map of Balcairn
- Coordinates: 43.20873°S 172.69783°E
- Country: New Zealand
- Region: Canterbury
- Territorial authority: Hurunui District
- Ward: South Ward
- Electorates: Kaikōura; Te Tai Tonga

Government
  - Territorial Authority: Hurunui District Council
  - Regional council: Environment Canterbury
  - Mayor of Hurunui: Marie Black
  - Kaikoura MP: Stuart Smith
  - Te Tai Tonga MP: Tākuta Ferris

Area
  - Total: 9.67 km^{2} (3.73 sq mi)
- Elevation: 40 m (130 ft)

Population (2023 census)
  - Total: 213
  - Density: 22.0/km^{2} (57.0/sq mi)
- Postcode: 7472
- Local iwi: Ngāi Tahu

Balcairn is a settlement in the Hurunui District in north Canterbury, near the east coast of the South Island of New Zealand. It is on State Highway 72, about 40 km (25 mi) north of Christchurch. It was the seat of Kowai County Council.

== History ==
In 1862 John Leith bought 3 sections, at the junction of 7 planned roads, and subdivided them into township sections in 1864 as the township of Balcairn, "the Depot of the North". Balcairn began with a store and a row of immigrant's cottages. Kowai Road Board moved its headquarters there in 1875, and in 1876 a few buildings appeared around the railway siding. John Lister, an 1860s Balcairn settler opened accommodation, G. Poole a bootmaking business, J. lnglesby a saddlery and G. Fenton coal and timber yards, John Cameron a butchery, George May as a carrier and Reid as a blacksmith.

Kowai cemetery was on the Leithfield Road, about a mile out of the settlement. St. John's Anglican Church was built in 1900, of wood and shingles, with seating for 65 and a belfry. It was in use until at least 1975.

=== Railway station ===
Balcairn railway station
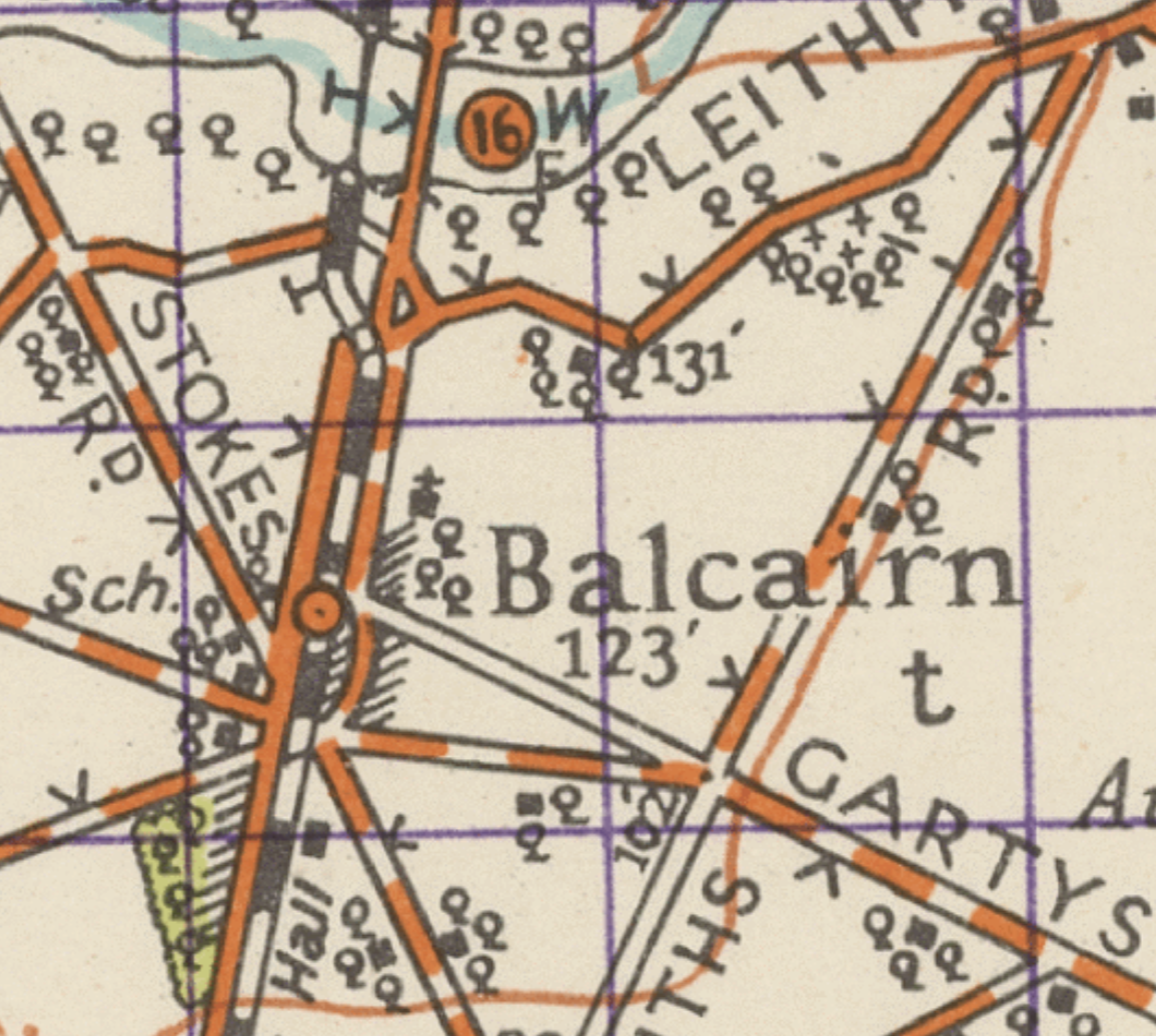
- 1950 map showing station, church, school and cemetery

General information
- Elevation: 123 ft (37 m)
- Owner: KiwiRail
- Distance: Christchurch 29 mi 40 ch (47.5 km)

History
- Opened: 3 November 1875
- Closed: 6 February 1966 final closure 16 September 1973

Services
Preceding station	Historical railways	Following station
Sefton; Line open, station closed 5.37 km (3.34 mi) towards Christchurch	Main North Line; KiwiRail	Grays Road; Line open, station closed 5.02 km (3.12 mi) towards Picton
Location

Balcairn railway station on the Main North Line was open from 1875 to 1973. The line is still used by freight trains and the Coastal Pacific.

The Ashley to Balcairn section opened on 3 November 1875, as the Canterbury Provincial Railways extended their 1,600 mm (5 ft 3 in) broad gauge line north. Initially it had one train a day, taking 1hr 25min from Christchurch. The line was extended to Amberley from 9 February 1876, with a bridge of 850 ft (260 m) over the South Kowai River and 1,040 ft (320 m) over the North. The whole route was converted to 1,067 mm (3 ft 6 in) narrow gauge on Thursday 20 December 1877.

There was a post office at the station run by railway staff until 1880 and between 1903 and 1911. By 1882 Balcairn had a 5th class station, platform, cart approach, 80 ft (24 m) x 30 ft (9.1 m) goods shed, stationmaster's house, ganger's house, urinals and a passing loop for 34 wagons. In 1886 sheep yards were added and by 1898 also a loading bank and cattle yards. In 1907 a ladies waiting room was created from a spare room. A station building was removed in 1962, though a building and platform remained in 1969 and in 1973, but not by 1978. The station closed to goods on 6 February 1966 and 16 September 1973 was probably the date of final closure. The road and rail bridges over the South Kowai were replaced in 1970.

== Demographics ==
Balcairn's population grew from 67 in 1878 to 168 in 1881 and 184 in 1891. At the 1901 census it was 218 and in 1951 148.

Balcairn locality covers 9.67 km^{2} (3.73 sq mi). Balcairn is part of the larger Balcairn statistical area.

Historical population
Year	Pop.	±% p.a.
2006	171	—
2013	198	+2.12%
2018	201	+0.30%
2023	213	+1.17%

Balcairn locality had a population of 213 in the 2023 New Zealand census, an increase of 12 people (6.0%) since the 2018 census, and an increase of 15 people (7.6%) since the 2013 census. There were 114 males and 99 females in 84 dwellings. 1.4% of people identified as LGBTIQ+. The median age was 53.2 years (compared with 38.1 years nationally). There were 33 people (15.5%) aged under 15 years, 24 (11.3%) aged 15 to 29, 102 (47.9%) aged 30 to 64, and 54 (25.4%) aged 65 or older.

People could identify as more than one ethnicity. The results were 95.8% European (Pākehā), 4.2% Māori, 1.4% Asian, and 4.2% other, which includes people giving their ethnicity as "New Zealander". English was spoken by 97.2%, and other languages by 7.0%. No language could be spoken by 2.8% (e.g. too young to talk). The percentage of people born overseas was 19.7, compared with 28.8% nationally.

Religious affiliations were 31.0% Christian, and 1.4% New Age. People who answered that they had no religion were 54.9%, and 12.7% of people did not answer the census question.

Of those at least 15 years old, 33 (18.3%) people had a bachelor's or higher degree, 99 (55.0%) had a post-high school certificate or diploma, and 48 (26.7%) people exclusively held high school qualifications. The median income was $35,900, compared with $41,500 nationally. 15 people (8.3%) earned over $100,000 compared to 12.1% nationally. The employment status of those at least 15 was 102 (56.7%) full-time and 24 (13.3%) part-time.

== Education ==
The opening of a school at Balcairn was celebrated by a soiree on 17 May 1878, but it closed and pupils were moved to Sefton in 1930.
