= State Highway 78 (New Zealand) =

Road in New Zealand

Coordinates: 44.390540°S 171.251244°E

State Highway 78
- Map of State Highway 78

Route information
- Maintained by NZ Transport Agency Waka Kotahi
- Length: 0.9 km (0.56 mi; 3,000 ft)

Major junctions
- West end: SH 1 at Timaru (cnr Theodosia Street & Sefton Street East)
- East end: Port of Timaru (cnr Port Loop Road & Marine Parade)

Location
- Country: New Zealand

Highway system
- New Zealand state highways; Motorways and expressways; List
| ← SH 77 | → SH 79 |

State Highway 78 is a New Zealand State Highway connecting central Timaru with its port. It holds the record for New Zealand's shortest state highway, with a length of just over 900 metres (3,000 ft).

== Route ==
State Highway 78 begins at State Highway 1 just north of the CBD. It follows Sefton Street East for 200 metres (660 ft) to Stafford Street, where it becomes Port Loop Road. The road then proceeds northeast over the South Island Main Trunk Railway, before turning anticlockwise around a loop, passing under itself parallel to the railway line. The highway terminates at the intersection of Port Loop Road with Marine Parade. It is believed to be the only State Highway that crosses itself (not counting motorway on/offramps).

State Highway 78 distance sign at the lower terminus of the route.

== See also ==
- List of New Zealand state highways
