= Arundel, New Zealand =

Arundel
- Rural village
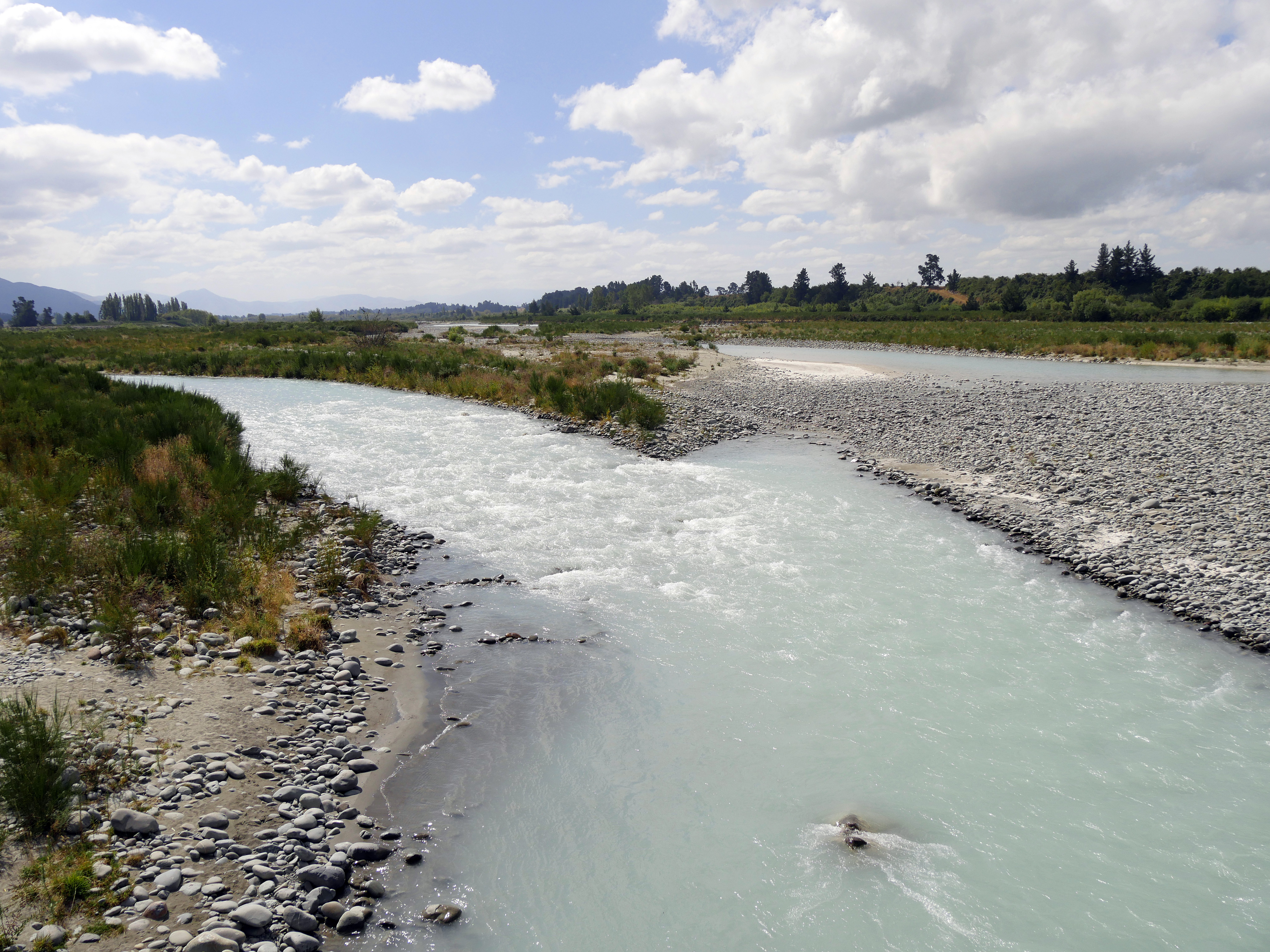
- Rangitata River near Arundel
- Interactive map of Arundel
- Coordinates: 43°59′0″S 171°17′0″E
- Country: New Zealand
- Region: Canterbury
- Territorial authority: Timaru District
- Ward: Geraldine
- Community: Geraldine
- Electorates: Waitaki; Te Tai Tonga (Māori)

Government
  - Territorial authority: Timaru District Council
  - Regional council: Environment Canterbury
  - Mayor of Timaru: Nigel Bowen
  - Waitaki MP: Miles Anderson
  - Te Tai Tonga MP: Tākuta Ferris

Area
  - Total: 64.34 km^{2} (24.84 sq mi)

Population (2023 census)
  - Total: 162
  - Density: 2.52/km^{2} (6.52/sq mi)

Arundel is a small rural village about 15 kilometres (9 mi) north of Geraldine, in the Canterbury region in the South Island of New Zealand. It is near the south bank of the Rangitata River, 3 kilometres (2 mi) from Peel Forest, an extensive podocarp forest with abundant birdlife. Arundel is flat and fertile, with fields and many mature trees.

Arundel has some historical importance. The nearby bridge over the Rangitata River was built in 1872, and was the only bridge linking South Canterbury with the rest of Canterbury until the 1930s when the road bridges on State Highway 1 were constructed. This gave Arundel an important position at the South Canterbury end of the bridge, and the village site was reserved in 1874, two years after the bridge was built. However, the population of Arundel village has never exceeded 100.

Arundel Lumber Company Ltd has operated in Arundel since 1951, processing Pinus radiata wood from production forests in South Canterbury, producing around 30 cubic metres (1,100 cu ft) of sawn timber per day.

There is a small cemetery south-west of the village, with over 160 graves approached through an avenue of flowering cherry trees.

Arundel is in the Carew Peel Forest School zoning school area.

== Demographics ==
Arundel locality covers 64.34 km^{2} (24.84 sq mi). It is part of the Arundel statistical area.

Historical population for Arundel locality
Year	Pop.	±% p.a.
2006	138	—
2013	147	+0.91%
2018	165	+2.34%
2023	162	−0.37%

Arundel had a population of 162 in the 2023 New Zealand census, a decrease of 3 people (−1.8%) since the 2018 census, and an increase of 15 people (10.2%) since the 2013 census. There were 81 males, 81 females, and 3 people of other genders in 60 dwellings. 1.9% of people identified as LGBTIQ+. The median age was 44.1 years (compared with 38.1 years nationally). There were 33 people (20.4%) aged under 15 years, 24 (14.8%) aged 15 to 29, 72 (44.4%) aged 30 to 64, and 36 (22.2%) aged 65 or older.

People could identify as more than one ethnicity. The results were 94.4% European (Pākehā); 1.9% Māori; 1.9% Pasifika; 1.9% Asian; 1.9% Middle Eastern, Latin American and African New Zealanders (MELAA); and 3.7% other, which includes people giving their ethnicity as "New Zealander". English was spoken by 100.0%, Māori by 1.9%, and other languages by 7.4%. New Zealand Sign Language was known by 1.9%. The percentage of people born overseas was 16.7, compared with 28.8% nationally.

Religious affiliations were 38.9% Christian, and 1.9% New Age. People who answered that they had no religion were 50.0%, and 11.1% of people did not answer the census question.

Of those at least 15 years old, 33 (25.6%) people had a bachelor's or higher degree, 66 (51.2%) had a post-high school certificate or diploma, and 30 (23.3%) people exclusively held high school qualifications. The median income was $41,900, compared with $41,500 nationally. 18 people (14.0%) earned over $100,000 compared to 12.1% nationally. The employment status of those at least 15 was 78 (60.5%) full-time and 24 (18.6%) part-time.

=== Arundel statistical area ===
Arundel statistical area covers an area north and west of Geraldine and also includes Hilton, Kakahu, Orari Bridge, Pleasant Valley and Woodbury. It covers 629.21 km^{2} (242.94 sq mi) and had an estimated population of 1,460 as of June 2025, with a population density of 2.3 people per km^{2}.

Historical population for the statistical area
Year	Pop.	±% p.a.
2006	1,122	—
2013	1,308	+2.22%
2018	1,368	+0.90%
2023	1,389	+0.31%

The statistical area had a population of 1,389 in the 2023 New Zealand census, an increase of 21 people (1.5%) since the 2018 census, and an increase of 81 people (6.2%) since the 2013 census. There were 720 males, 663 females, and 6 people of other genders in 543 dwellings. 1.7% of people identified as LGBTIQ+. The median age was 45.6 years (compared with 38.1 years nationally). There were 264 people (19.0%) aged under 15 years, 219 (15.8%) aged 15 to 29, 636 (45.8%) aged 30 to 64, and 270 (19.4%) aged 65 or older.

People could identify as more than one ethnicity. The results were 93.3% European (Pākehā); 6.3% Māori; 0.6% Pasifika; 1.5% Asian; 1.9% Middle Eastern, Latin American and African New Zealanders (MELAA); and 4.5% other, which includes people giving their ethnicity as "New Zealander". English was spoken by 97.6%, Māori by 1.5%, Samoan by 0.2%, and other languages by 7.1%. No language could be spoken by 1.7% (e.g. too young to talk). New Zealand Sign Language was known by 0.4%. The percentage of people born overseas was 15.8, compared with 28.8% nationally.

Religious affiliations were 32.0% Christian, 0.2% Hindu, 0.2% New Age, and 0.4% other religions. People who answered that they had no religion were 58.3%, and 8.6% of people did not answer the census question.

Of those at least 15 years old, 255 (22.7%) people had a bachelor's or higher degree, 633 (56.3%) had a post-high school certificate or diploma, and 243 (21.6%) people exclusively held high school qualifications. The median income was $44,700, compared with $41,500 nationally. 123 people (10.9%) earned over $100,000 compared to 12.1% nationally. The employment status of those at least 15 was 612 (54.4%) full-time, 225 (20.0%) part-time, and 15 (1.3%) unemployed.
