= Charles Macintosh (rugby union) =

- Born: Charles Nicholson Macintosh; 6 June 1869 Timaru, New Zealand
- Died: 14 September 1918 (aged 49) Rio de Janeiro, Brazil
- School: Timaru Boys' High School
- Notable relative: Robert Macintosh (son)

Rugby union career
- Position: Forward
Provincial / State sides
Years	Team	Apps	(Points)
1888–96	South Canterbury		
International career
Years	Team	Apps	(Points)
1893	New Zealand	0	(0)

Charles Nicholson Macintosh (6 June 1869 – 14 September 1918) was a New Zealand rugby union player and politician. He served as Mayor of Timaru between 1901 and 1902.

== Early life and family ==
Born in Timaru in 1869, Macintosh was educated at Timaru Boys' High School. On 28 May 1890 he married Lydia Beatrice Thompson in Timaru. Their children included the anaesthetist Robert Macintosh, who was born in 1897.

== Rugby union ==
A forward, Macintosh represented South Canterbury at a provincial level, and was a member of the New Zealand national side, the All Blacks, on their 1893 tour of Australia. On that tour he played in four matches, including wins over New South Wales and Queensland.

== Political career ==
Macintosh was first elected as a member of the Timaru Borough Council in 1896. In 1898 he was also elected to the Timaru Harbour Board. Despite the local newspaper, The Timaru Herald, not supporting him, he was elected Mayor of Timaru in 1901, and served a one-year term, after which he stood down.

== Later life ==
On 29 April 1903 Macintosh left Timaru, saying that he was visiting a farm near Temuka. Instead, he travelled by train to Lyttelton and then ship to Wellington, from where he sailed for South America. A warrant for his arrest was issued on 4 May, relating to a charge of fraud in a property transaction, and on 22 June 1903 he was declared bankrupt.

Macintosh settled and worked in commerce in Buenos Aires. He died while on business in Rio de Janeiro in 1918. In 1940 his son, John Nicholson Macintosh, was appointed British vice-consul in Santa Fe, Argentina.

Political offices
Preceded by John Hole	Mayor of Timaru; 1901–1902	Succeeded by James Craigie
