= Temuka River =

Coordinates: 44°14′S 171°16′E

Location
- Country: New Zealand

Physical characteristics
- Mouth
  - location: Waihī River
- Length: 19 km (12 mi)

The Temuka River, originally Te Umu Kaha River, is a river of the Canterbury region of New Zealand's South Island. It is one of numerous rivers which meet close to the south Canterbury town of Temuka, all of which are part of the Ōpihi River's system.

The river has been considered unsuitable for swimming or recreation since 2025, with the water quality graded as 'poor' from monitoring undertaken by Environment Canterbury. Blooms of toxic cyanobacteria are known to occur in the river.

== See also ==
- List of rivers of New Zealand
