= Kakahu River =

Coordinates: 44°11′S 171°14′E

Location
- Country: New Zealand

Physical characteristics
- Length: 33 km (21 mi)

The Kakahu River is a river of south Canterbury, New Zealand. It flows east and then southeast from its source 15 kilometres (9 mi) east of Fairlie, joining with the Hae Hae Te Moana River before flowing into the Waihī River close to the town of Temuka.

The presence of kōura (freshwater crayfish) has been identified in the river through environmental DNA sampling. Fish species found in the river include longfin eel, shortfin eel, upland bully, common bully and trout.

The Kakahu River is part of an irrigation scheme connected to the Opuha Dam, with water from the dam discharged into the Kakahu River for farmers to draw from. The irrigation consent conditions require that the river must not lose more than 50 percent clarity following discharge, however there have been issues meeting this requirement, particularly when the water level is low.

Concerns have been raised about the impact of this irrigation scheme on the ecological health of the river, particularly changes in the turbidity of the water. Higher quantitative macroinvertebrate community index (QMCI) scores were found upstream of the discharge point compared with downstream.

A 2024 report assessed the ecological health of the Kakahu River as ‘moderate' nearby the discharge point, declining to ‘poor’ further downstream, and identified the fine sediment from the discharge and the changes in flow as likely causes. There has been a proposal to develop a pipeline which would bypass the river, and deliver irrigation water directly to farms.

== See also ==
- List of rivers of New Zealand
