= Damon Odey =

Former mayor of Timaru, New Zealand

- Born: Damon Odey; 17 May 1971 (age 54); South Canterbury
- Occupations: Company director, mayor
- Known for: Mayor of Timaru (2013–2019)

Damon Odey (born 17 May 1971) is the former mayor of the New Zealand town of Timaru.

== Biography ==
Odey was born in 1971 in South Canterbury, New Zealand. He later moved into the town of Timaru. Odey's professional background is in engineering. His first job was as a boat builder and later he became the managing director of Parr & Co Engineering; he has been in that role since 2002. He has a wife and three children.

In 2013 he ran for Timaru's mayoralty and his election opponent was Steve Earnshaw. Odey obtained 10,335 votes whilst Earnshaw received 5,799, and Odey was thus declared elected. He succeeded Janie Annear as mayor who did not stand again in 2013.
