= Gapes Valley =

Valley in the Canterbury Region, New Zealand

Coordinates: 44°6′46.16″S 171°8′5.11″E

Gapes Valley is a valley in the Canterbury Region in the South Island of New Zealand. It is about 6 kilometres (3.7 mi) west of Geraldine and located on the Geraldine Fairlie Highway. The valley is nestled between the Waitohi Hill and the Rocky Ridges and is described as being 4 miles (6.4 km) long with the flat land of exceptional quality. Today Gapes Valley consists of a sparse grouping of houses, the hall and a recently established brewery.

== History ==
The valley was named after William Gapes (born in Saffron Walden, Essex, England; twin brother of James Gapes), who after working throughout the region settled on an 123 acres (50 ha) farm in the valley. The valley was once home to a small post office. The Gapes Valley School was opened in 1882 though would later close with students moving to the nearby Hilton School.

Many roads in the area bear the names of pioneer families, such as: Halls, Loves, Patricks, Slacks and Wells.
