= Ōpihi River =

River in the South Island of New Zealand

Coordinates: 44°16′55″S 171°20′56″E

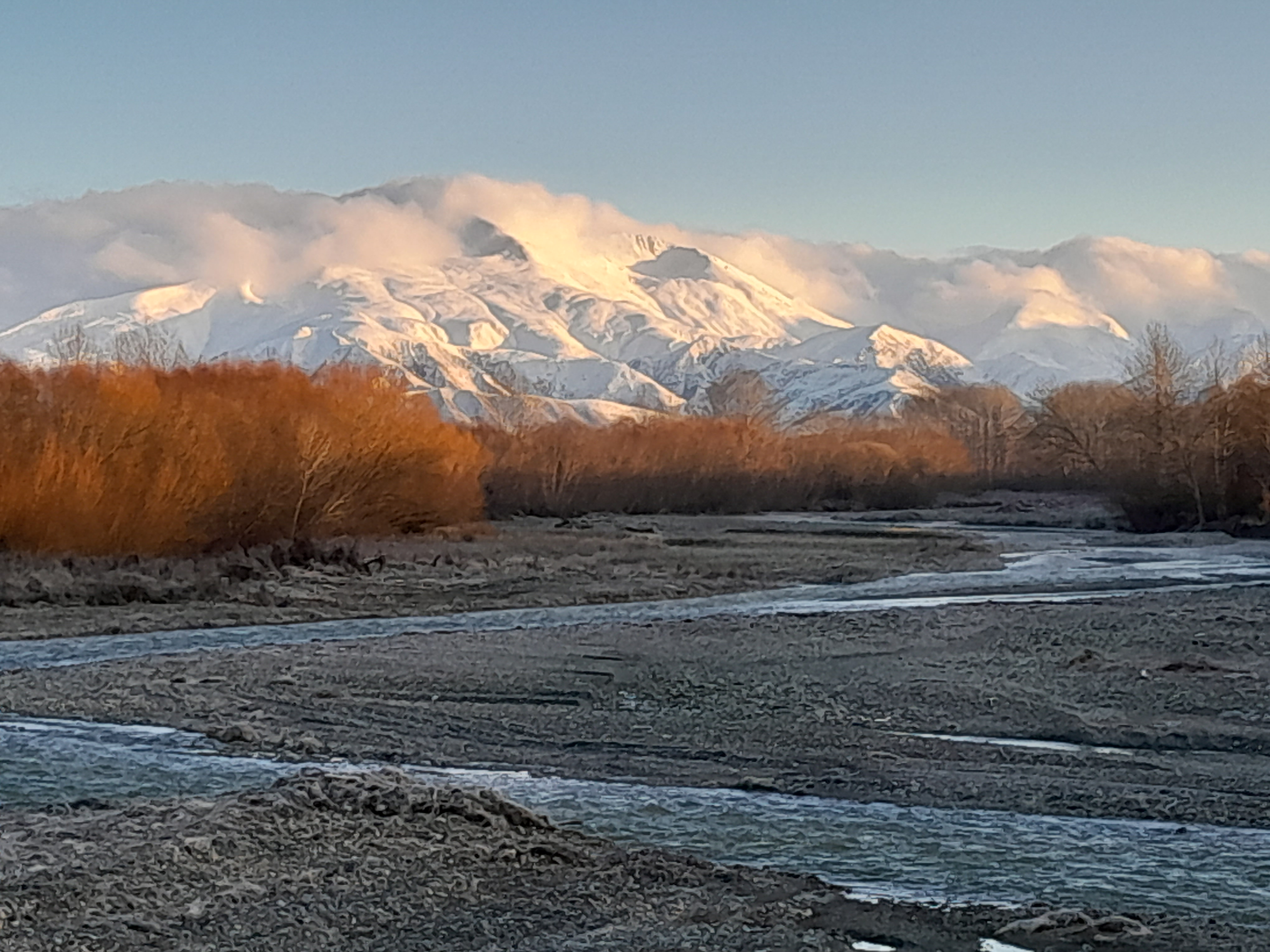
Ōpihi river looking towards the Two Thumb mountain range

The Ōpihi River is a braided river located in south Canterbury, in New Zealand's South Island.

It is a hill-fed river with multiple tributaries, including Opuha River, Kakahu River, Waihī River, Tengawai River and Temuka River.

== Description ==
The Ōpihi River flows south-east for 75 kilometres (47 mi), reaching the Pacific Ocean 10 kilometres (6 mi) north of Timaru. The town of Fairlie lies on the river's banks.

The local Kāi Tahu hapū of Kāti Huirapa have shared that the river was an important food supply for nearby settlements, reporting the presence of several fish species, including eels, whitebait, and kōkopu.

The lower reaches of the river experiences moderate nutrient enrichment, often with high bacterial concentrations, likely driven by nearby land use change for farming activities. Multiple health warnings have been issued for sites along the river due to the presence of cyanobacteria blooms.

In 2022, part of the river's stop bank near Pleasant Point was damaged following heavy rain.

It has been identified as an Important Bird Area by BirdLife International because it supports breeding colonies of the endangered black-billed gull.

== History ==
The banks of the river around the settlement of Waitohi were the site of some of the first flights by pioneer aviator Richard Pearse.

Chinook salmon (Oncorhynchus tshawytscha) were introduced from California in the 1900s and persist today. Commercial eeling began in the river in the late 1970s, leading to the implementation of an eel management plan to determine when to reduce quota in the 1990s, and eventually a ban on commercial fishing.

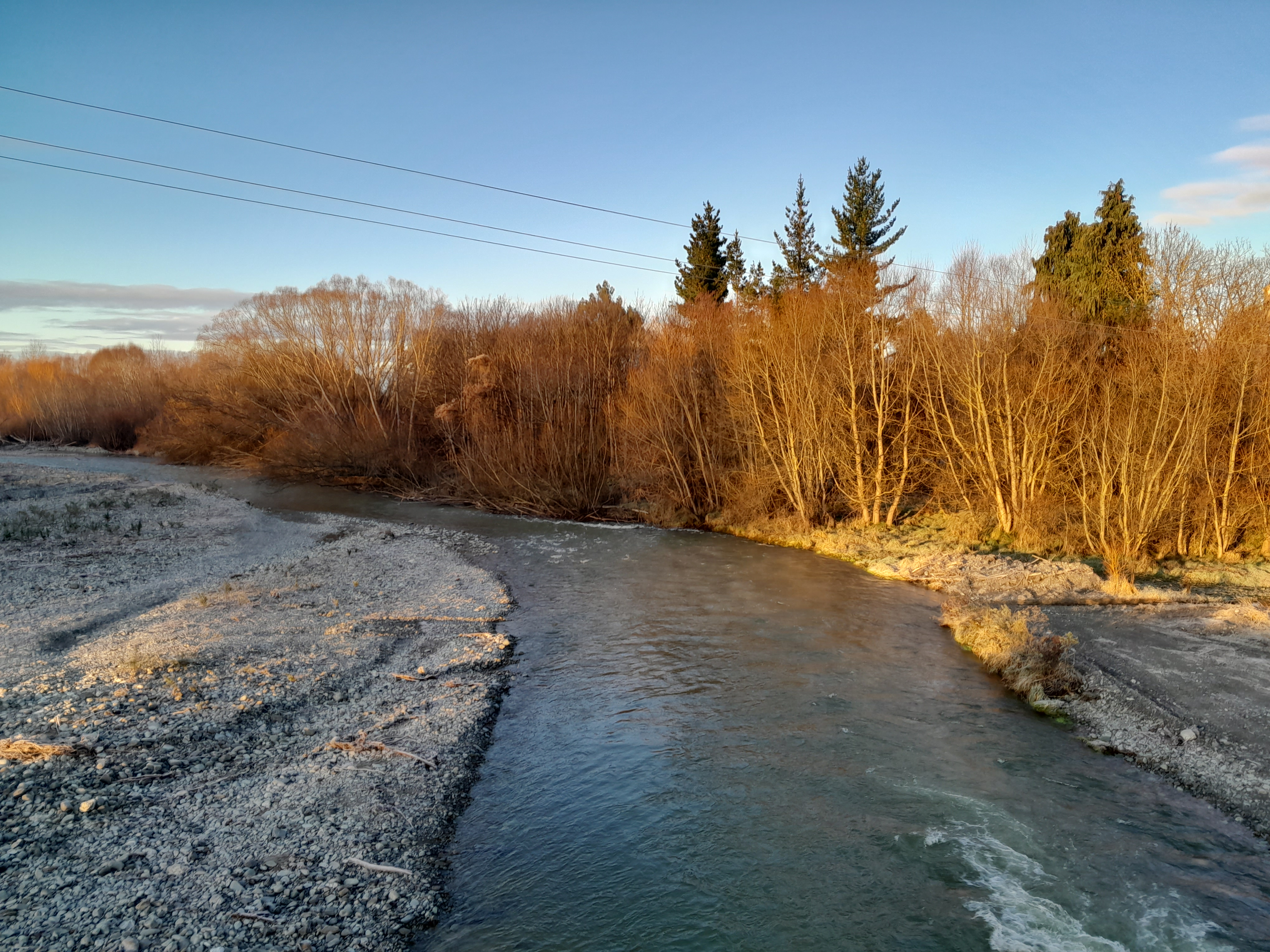
Ōpihi river (near Fairlie, New Zealand)

In 2000, Environment Canterbury approved the Opihi River Regional Plan for sustainable management of the resources of the river.
