= Orari, New Zealand =

Orari
- Rural settlement
- Interactive map of Orari
- Coordinates: 44.13736°S 171.29807°E
- Country: New Zealand
- Region: Canterbury
- Territorial authority: Timaru District
- Ward: Geraldine
- Community: Geraldine
- Electorates: Rangitata; Te Tai Tonga (Māori)

Government
  - Territorial authority: Timaru District Council
  - Regional council: Environment Canterbury
  - Mayor of Timaru: Nigel Bowen
  - Rangitata MP: James Meager
  - Te Tai Tonga MP: Tākuta Ferris

Area
  - Total: 3.17 km^{2} (1.22 sq mi)

Population (June 2025)
  - Total: 200
  - Density: 63/km^{2} (160/sq mi)
- Time zone: UTC+12 (New Zealand Standard Time)
  - Summer (DST): UTC+13 (New Zealand Daylight Time)
- Postcode: 7992

Orari (Māori: Ōrarī) is a small town in the South Canterbury region of New Zealand's South Island, roughly midway between Ashburton to the north, and Timaru to the south.

The New Zealand Ministry for Culture and Heritage gives a translation of "place of the butterfish" for Ōrarī.

The outskirts of Orari consists of mainly 2-8 hectare "lifestyle blocks", domestic land parcels where families graze farm animals including horses, sheep and cattle. Surrounding the town is pastoral farmland including sheep raised for wool and meat, small scale horse breeding, and large scale dairy farming, orchards supporting fruit and nut production, and small support businesses supporting bee wax refining, irrigation, and agricultural and farming activities.

Orari is the location of the Orari racecourse, the site of the region's annual Christmas horse racing event.

State Highway 1 and the Main South Line railway pass through the east edge of Orari, turning off State Highway 1 into Orari provides travelers easy access to the McKenzie country, Tekapo and Mt Cook.

Generally warm dry summers (typically highs are 22-32C) that can be affected by strong NW winds exceeding 100 km/h, with cool dry winters with little snow fall and a high number of frost nights. Orari rainfall was less than 600mm (24 inches) for both 2014 and 2015.

== Demographics ==
Orari is described as a rural settlement by Statistics New Zealand, and covers 3.17 km^{2} (1.22 sq mi). It had an estimated population of 200 as of June 2025, with a population density of 63 people per km^{2}. The settlement is part of the larger Rangitata statistical area.

Historical population
Year	Pop.	±% p.a.
2006	147	—
2013	186	+3.42%
2018	165	−2.37%
2023	198	+3.71%

Ōrarī had a population of 198 in the 2023 New Zealand census, an increase of 33 people (20.0%) since the 2018 census, and an increase of 12 people (6.5%) since the 2013 census. There were 105 males and 90 females in 75 dwellings. 3.0% of people identified as LGBTIQ+. The median age was 50.5 years (compared with 38.1 years nationally). There were 33 people (16.7%) aged under 15 years, 24 (12.1%) aged 15 to 29, 96 (48.5%) aged 30 to 64, and 42 (21.2%) aged 65 or older.

People could identify as more than one ethnicity. The results were 95.5% European (Pākehā), 6.1% Māori, 3.0% Pasifika, and 6.1% other, which includes people giving their ethnicity as "New Zealander". English was spoken by 98.5%, Māori by 1.5%, and other languages by 1.5%. No language could be spoken by 3.0% (e.g. too young to talk). The percentage of people born overseas was 10.6, compared with 28.8% nationally.

Religious affiliations were 28.8% Christian, and 1.5% other religions. People who answered that they had no religion were 62.1%, and 7.6% of people did not answer the census question.

Of those at least 15 years old, 12 (7.3%) people had a bachelor's or higher degree, 102 (61.8%) had a post-high school certificate or diploma, and 48 (29.1%) people exclusively held high school qualifications. The median income was $38,900, compared with $41,500 nationally. 15 people (9.1%) earned over $100,000 compared to 12.1% nationally. The employment status of those at least 15 was 81 (49.1%) full-time and 27 (16.4%) part-time.

== Climate ==
Climate data for Orari (1991–2020)
Month	Jan	Feb	Mar	Apr	May	Jun	Jul	Aug	Sep	Oct	Nov	Dec	Year
Mean daily maximum °C (°F)	22.1 (71.8)	21.7 (71.1)	20.0 (68.0)	16.9 (62.4)	14.0 (57.2)	11.2 (52.2)	10.8 (51.4)	12.5 (54.5)	15.0 (59.0)	16.8 (62.2)	18.5 (65.3)	20.5 (68.9)	16.7 (62.0)
Daily mean °C (°F)	16.3 (61.3)	16.0 (60.8)	14.2 (57.6)	11.2 (52.2)	8.5 (47.3)	5.7 (42.3)	5.2 (41.4)	6.8 (44.2)	9.0 (48.2)	10.9 (51.6)	12.7 (54.9)	14.9 (58.8)	11.0 (51.7)
Mean daily minimum °C (°F)	10.5 (50.9)	10.3 (50.5)	8.4 (47.1)	5.6 (42.1)	3.0 (37.4)	0.3 (32.5)	−0.4 (31.3)	1.2 (34.2)	3.1 (37.6)	5.0 (41.0)	6.8 (44.2)	9.2 (48.6)	5.3 (41.5)
Average rainfall mm (inches)	56.1 (2.21)	61.3 (2.41)	55.0 (2.17)	64.5 (2.54)	50.3 (1.98)	53.8 (2.12)	54.3 (2.14)	58.1 (2.29)	43.9 (1.73)	56.6 (2.23)	63.1 (2.48)	60.1 (2.37)	677.1 (26.67)
Source: NIWA
