= Winchester, New Zealand =

Winchester
- Town
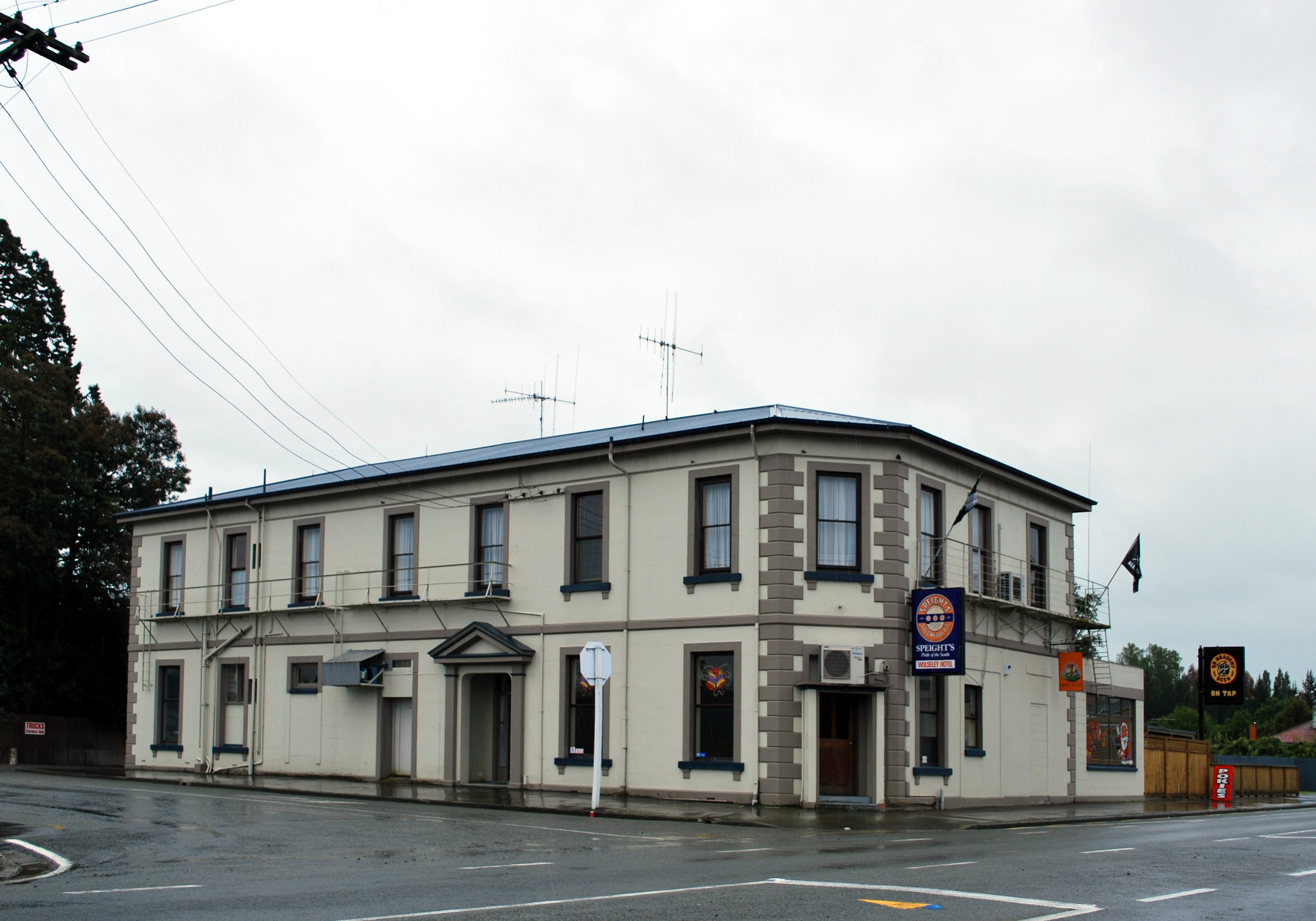
- Wolseley Tavern, Winchester
- Interactive map of Winchester
- Coordinates: 44°11′09″S 171°16′41″E
- Country: New Zealand
- Region: Canterbury
- Territorial authority: Timaru District
- Ward: Pleasant Point-Temuka
- Community: Temuka
- Electorates: Rangitata; Te Tai Tonga (Māori)

Government
  - Territorial authority: Timaru District Council
  - Regional council: Environment Canterbury
  - Mayor of Timaru: Nigel Bowen
  - Rangitata MP: James Meager
  - Te Tai Tonga MP: Tākuta Ferris

Area
  - Total: 0.68 km^{2} (0.26 sq mi)

Population (June 2025)
  - Total: 260
  - Density: 380/km^{2} (990/sq mi)
- Time zone: UTC+12 (New Zealand Standard Time)
  - Summer (DST): UTC+13 (New Zealand Daylight Time)
- Postcode: 7958
- Local iwi: Ngāi Tahu

Winchester is a small town in the South-Canterbury region of New Zealand's South Island. Winchester is 6.9 kilometres north of Temuka and 51 kilometres southwest of Ashburton.

State Highway 1 and the Main South Line railway pass through Winchester.

== History ==
Winchester was founded by Major John Albert Young. He built the Winchester Hotel in 1863. It was popular with anglers coming to fish the local rivers. Young later built the Wolseley Hotel in 1884.

The Winchester Wool Scouring Works were established in 1869 close to the railway station. They handled 1200 to 1500 bales of greasy wool and around 50,000 sheepskins annually. Winchester was also home to a flour mill, a saw mill and seed cleaning plant and a factory making products out of concrete.

The Temuka and Geraldine Agricultural and Pastoral Association show has been held on the Winchester Domain since 1910.

Winchester had a population of 410 people in 1956.

== Demographics ==
Winchester is described as a rural settlement by Statistics New Zealand, and covers 0.68 km^{2} (0.26 sq mi). It had an estimated population of 260 as of June 2025, with a population density of 382 people per km^{2}. The settlement is part of the larger Waitohi statistical area.

Historical population
Year	Pop.	±% p.a.
2006	264	—
2013	261	−0.16%
2018	267	+0.46%
2023	261	−0.45%

Winchester had a population of 261 in the 2023 New Zealand census, a decrease of 6 people (−2.2%) since the 2018 census, and unchanged since the 2013 census. There were 141 males and 117 females in 117 dwellings. 3.4% of people identified as LGBTIQ+. The median age was 53.2 years (compared with 38.1 years nationally). There were 30 people (11.5%) aged under 15 years, 30 (11.5%) aged 15 to 29, 132 (50.6%) aged 30 to 64, and 69 (26.4%) aged 65 or older.

People could identify as more than one ethnicity. The results were 90.8% European (Pākehā); 6.9% Māori; 1.1% Pasifika; 2.3% Asian; 1.1% Middle Eastern, Latin American and African New Zealanders (MELAA); and 9.2% other, which includes people giving their ethnicity as "New Zealander". English was spoken by 98.9%, and other languages by 4.6%. The percentage of people born overseas was 10.3, compared with 28.8% nationally.

Religious affiliations were 27.6% Christian, 1.1% Hindu, 1.1% Māori religious beliefs, 1.1% Buddhist, and 1.1% other religions. People who answered that they had no religion were 59.8%, and 10.3% of people did not answer the census question.

Of those at least 15 years old, 18 (7.8%) people had a bachelor's or higher degree, 141 (61.0%) had a post-high school certificate or diploma, and 69 (29.9%) people exclusively held high school qualifications. The median income was $30,500, compared with $41,500 nationally. 12 people (5.2%) earned over $100,000 compared to 12.1% nationally. The employment status of those at least 15 was 99 (42.9%) full-time, 36 (15.6%) part-time, and 6 (2.6%) unemployed.

== Education ==
Winchester Rural School is a year 1–6 primary school with a roll of 116 students as of July 2026. It opened as Waihi Crossing School in 1870, but was destroyed by fire in 1887. A new school was built on the present site in 1888. This was renamed Winchester School in 1891. Te Awa School (opened 1917, using an 1886 building from Rangitira Valley School) closed in 1955 with some of its students moving to Winchester School. The school dropped its intermediate classes (years 7 and 8) in 1977. Milford School (opened 1872) merged with Wincester School in 2005 and the name changed to Winchester Rural School.

Waihi School is an Anglican private year 4–8 full primary school with a roll of 137 students. The school was established in 1907 as a boys' school. It became co-educational in 2021.

== Road safety ==
The 50 kilometre per hour speed limit has been extended by 140 metres to the north on the state highway 1 section running through Winchester from the end of October 2020. This is due to concerns from local residents about vehicles travelling through Winchester at high speed. Between 2009 and 2018, there were 15 crashes on the Winchester section of state highway 1. These resulted in five people suffering minor injuries.

A new roundabout was built on the intersection of Winchester-Geraldine, Tiplady, McKenzie and Coach roads in 2021. This five way intersection had eight crashes in the previous 10 years. The project funded by Waka Kotahi NZTA cost $2 million. The project was long awaited by the local community.
