= Peel Forest Park Scenic Reserve =

Forest reserve in New Zealand

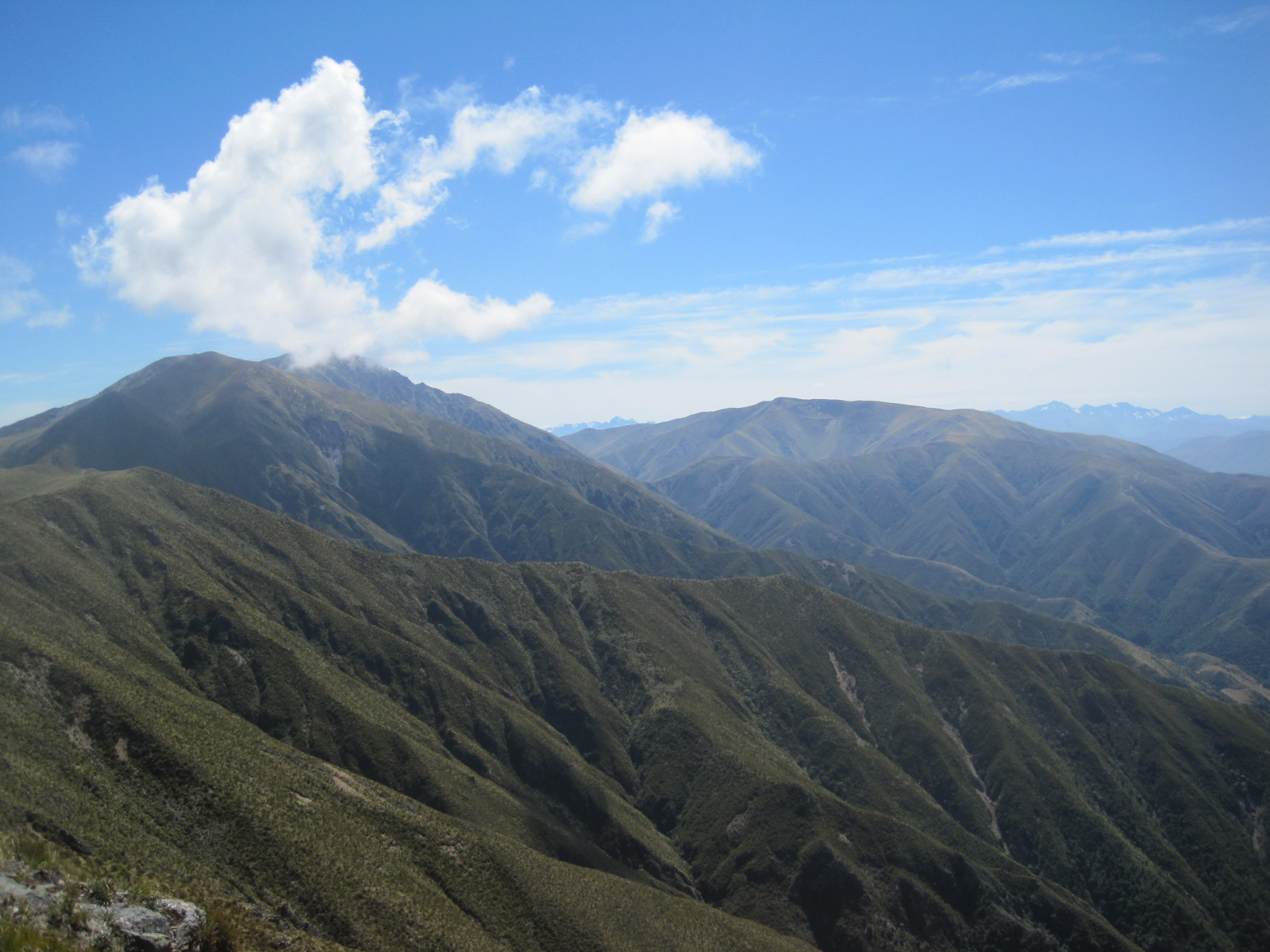
- View of Big Mt. Peel from Little Mt. Peel

- Location within New Zealand
- Location: Canterbury, South Island, New Zealand
- Nearest town: Geraldine
- Coordinates: 43°53′27″S 171°14′05″E
- Area: 768.6 ha (1,899 acres)
- Established: 1909
- Operator: Department of Conservation
- Website: Official website

The Peel Forest Park Scenic Reserve is a 769-hectare (1,900-acre) forest reserve in the Canterbury region in the South Island of New Zealand. It is located near the Rangitata River and is in the foothills of the Southern Alps. The park is managed by the Department of Conservation as a scenic reserve, not a forest park.

== Etymology ==
The forest was named by Francis Jollie, who settled in the area in late 1853. Jollie had named the forest after Sir Robert Peel, the British Prime Minister of the United Kingdom who had died in 1850, the year that Canterbury was founded. The adjacent mountain and the nearby community of Peel Forest also took Peel's name.

== Flora and fauna ==
The Peel Forest is the remnant of a large Podocarpaceae forest. The three major tree types are the kahikatea (white pine), tōtara and mataī (black pine). Logging reduced the forest to its current size. For his lengthy botanical study of Mount Peel, Harry Allan was awarded a Doctor of Science in 1923.

The forest is also home to many birds including kererū, fantail (pīwakawaka), and tomtit (miromiro).

== Activities ==
Tramping is a popular activity in the park. There are several short walks, tramps, and one longer route that leads to the summit of Little Mount Peel.

== See also ==
- Forest parks of New Zealand
- Protected areas of New Zealand
- Conservation in New Zealand
- Tramping in New Zealand
