= Waihī River =

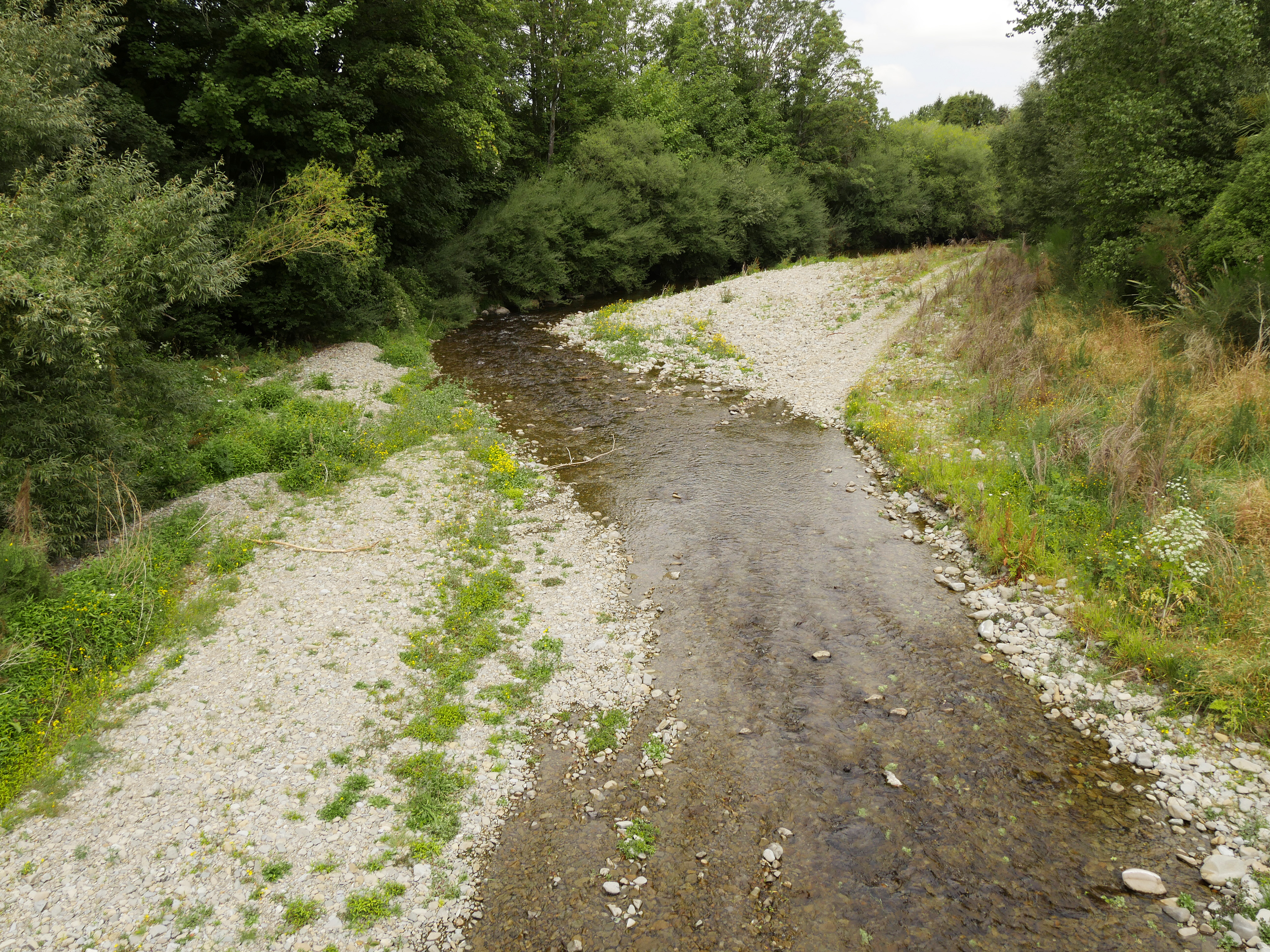
- Waihī River in 2017

Location
- Country: New Zealand

Physical characteristics
- Source
  - location: Four Peaks Range
- Mouth
  - location: Ōpihi River
  - coordinates: 44.063°S 171.244°E
- Length: 42 km (26 mi)

The Waihī River is a river of the south Canterbury region of New Zealand's South Island. It flows southeast from its sources in the Four Peaks Range, flowing through the town of Geraldine to reach the Ōpihi River close to Temuka.

== See also ==
- List of rivers of New Zealand
