= Orari River =

Coordinates: 44°15′S 171°25′E

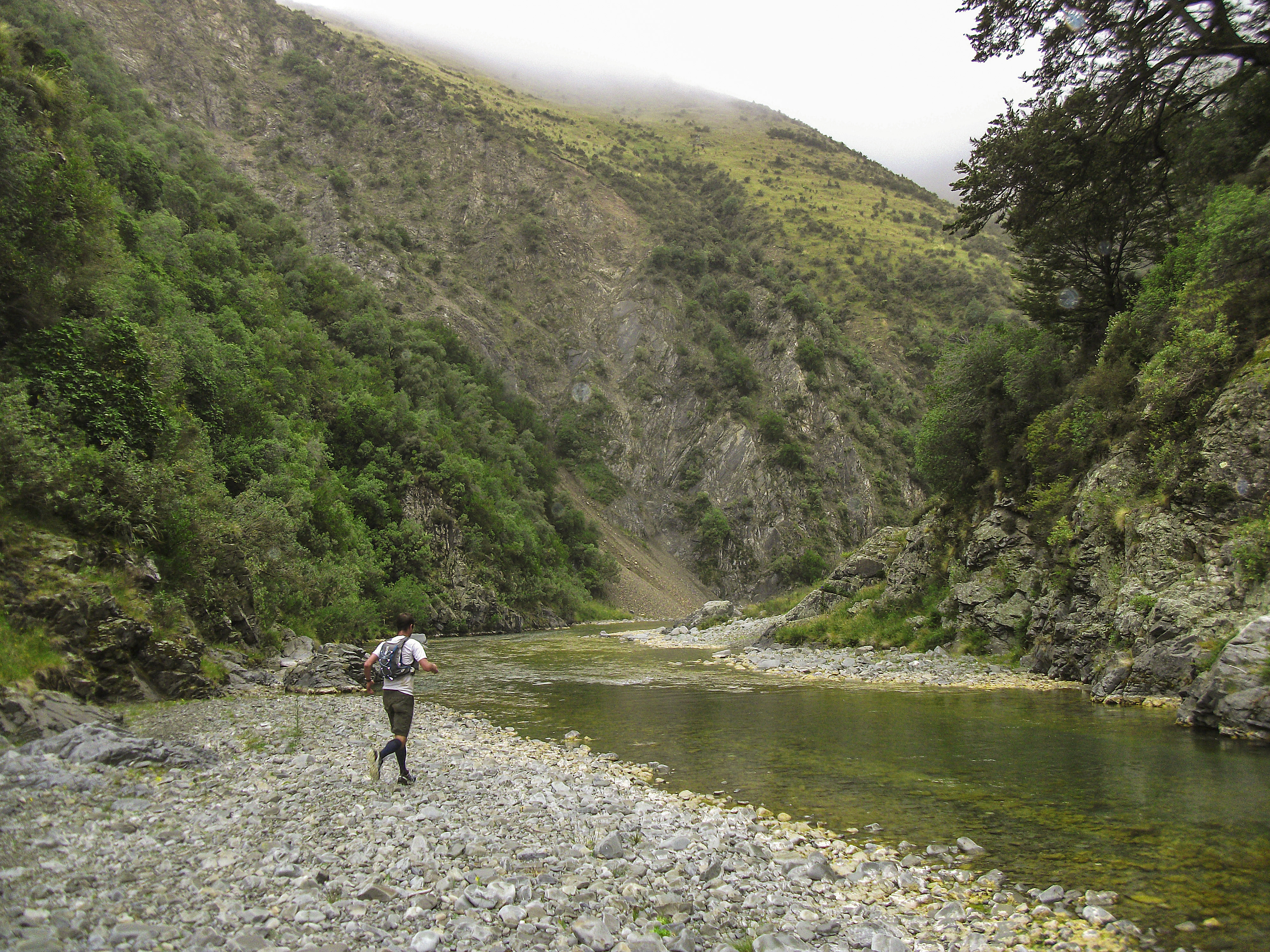
- Orari River

Location
- Country: New Zealand

Physical characteristics
- Source
  - location: Four Peaks Range
- Mouth
  - location: Pacific Ocean
- Length: 74 km (46 mi)

The Orari River is a river of the south Canterbury region of New Zealand's South Island. It rises to the northwest of the Four Peaks Range, initially flowing north then east to circumnavigate the range before flowing southeast across the Canterbury Plains. It reaches the Pacific Ocean 8 kilometres (5 mi) east of Temuka. The towns of Geraldine and Orari are both close to its banks. The river has been identified as an Important Bird Area by BirdLife International because it supports breeding colonies of the endangered black-billed gull.

== See also ==
- List of rivers of New Zealand
