= Timaru District =

- Territorial authority district
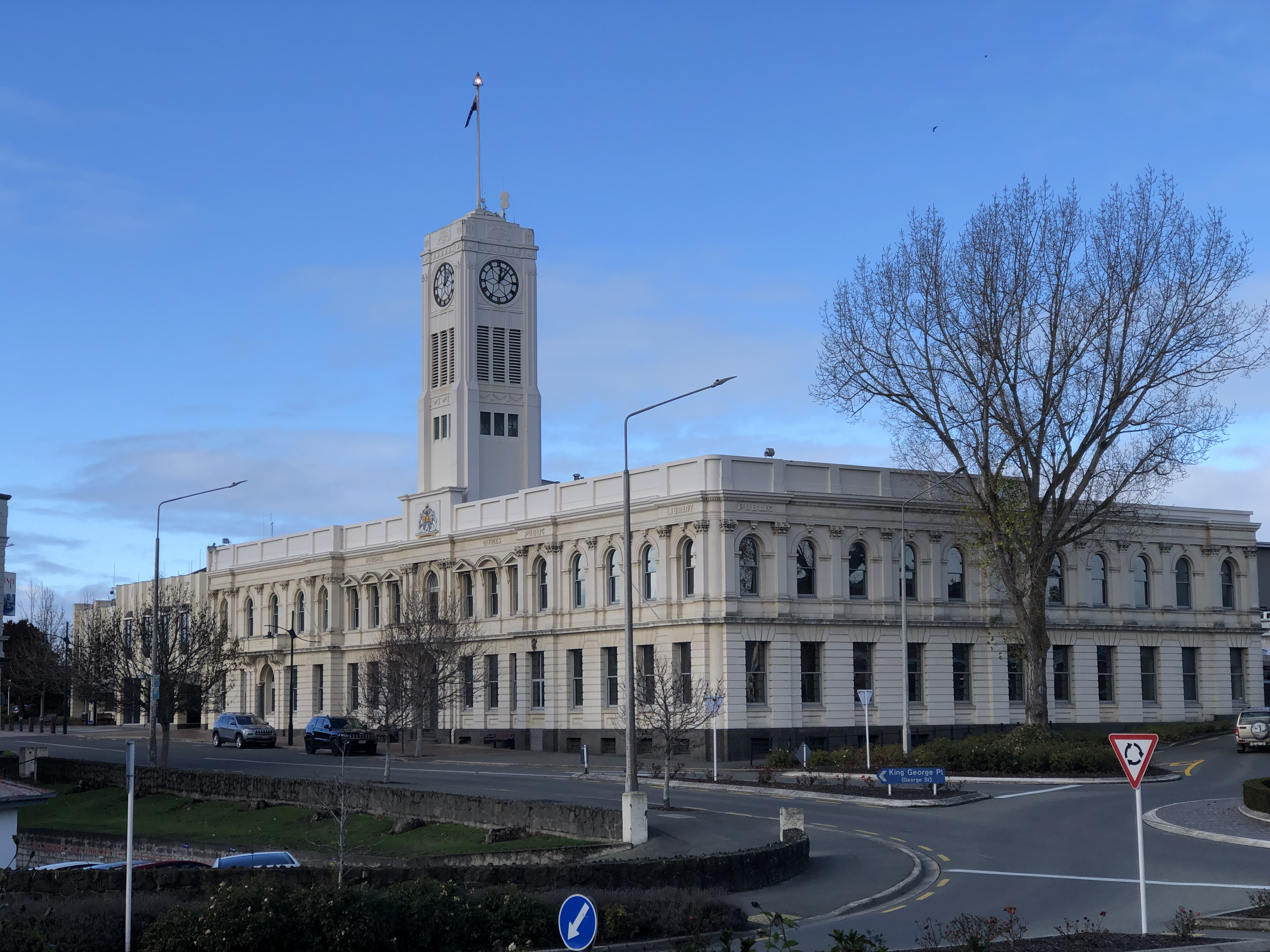
- Timaru District Council building

- Coat of arms

- Timaru district in the South Island
- Country: New Zealand
- Island: South Island
- Region: Canterbury
- Communities: Geraldine; Pleasant Point; Temuka
- Wards: Geraldine; Pleasant Point-Temuka; Timaru
- Formed: 1989
- Seat: Timaru

Government
  - Mayor: Nigel Bowen
  - Deputy Mayor: Scott Shannon
  - Territorial authority: Timaru District Council

Area
  - Total: 2,732.41 km^{2} (1,054.99 sq mi)

Population (June 2025)
  - Total: 49,500
  - Density: 18.1/km^{2} (46.9/sq mi)
- Time zone: UTC+12 (NZST)
  - Summer (DST): UTC+13 (NZDT)
- Postcode(s): Map of postcodes
- Website: www.timaru.govt.nz

Timaru District is a local government district on New Zealand's South Island, administered by the Timaru District Council. It is part of the larger Canterbury Region. Timaru district was formed in 1989 from the amalgamation of Timaru City, Geraldine borough, Temuka borough and Strathallan County.

== Geography ==
The Timaru District is located on the east coast of the South Island and stretches inland as far as the Main Divide. The district has a population of 49,500 (June 2025). Timaru is the main city. The next biggest towns in order are Temuka, Geraldine and Pleasant Point. Smaller settlements include Arundel, Cave, Orari and Winchester. The Timaru District Library has branches situated in Timaru, Temuka and Geraldine.

== Demographics ==
Timaru District covers 2,732.41 km^{2} (1,054.99 sq mi) and had an estimated population of 49,500 as of June 2025, with a population density of 18.1 people per km^{2}.

Historical population
Year	Pop.	±% p.a.
2006	42,870	—
2013	43,932	+0.35%
2018	46,296	+1.05%
2023	47,547	+0.53%

Timaru District had a population of 47,547 in the 2023 New Zealand census, an increase of 1,251 people (2.7%) since the 2018 census, and an increase of 3,615 people (8.2%) since the 2013 census. There were 23,478 males, 23,913 females and 159 people of other genders in 19,758 dwellings. 2.4% of people identified as LGBTIQ+. The median age was 44.6 years (compared with 38.1 years nationally). There were 8,349 people (17.6%) aged under 15 years, 7,449 (15.7%) aged 15 to 29, 20,850 (43.9%) aged 30 to 64, and 10,902 (22.9%) aged 65 or older.

People could identify as more than one ethnicity. The results were 87.3% European (Pākehā); 10.4% Māori; 3.5% Pasifika; 5.8% Asian; 0.9% Middle Eastern, Latin American and African New Zealanders (MELAA); and 2.9% other, which includes people giving their ethnicity as "New Zealander". English was spoken by 97.4%, Māori language by 1.9%, Samoan by 0.9% and other languages by 7.7%. No language could be spoken by 1.6% (e.g. too young to talk). New Zealand Sign Language was known by 0.6%. The percentage of people born overseas was 16.0, compared with 28.8% nationally.

Religious affiliations were 36.7% Christian, 0.9% Hindu, 0.4% Islam, 0.3% Māori religious beliefs, 0.4% Buddhist, 0.4% New Age, and 1.1% other religions. People who answered that they had no religion were 51.8%, and 8.1% of people did not answer the census question.

Of those at least 15 years old, 4,476 (11.4%) people had a bachelor's or higher degree, 22,488 (57.4%) had a post-high school certificate or diploma, and 10,887 (27.8%) people exclusively held high school qualifications. The median income was $38,600, compared with $41,500 nationally. 3,267 people (8.3%) earned over $100,000 compared to 12.1% nationally. The employment status of those at least 15 was that 19,185 (48.9%) people were employed full-time, 5,619 (14.3%) were part-time, and 714 (1.8%) were unemployed.

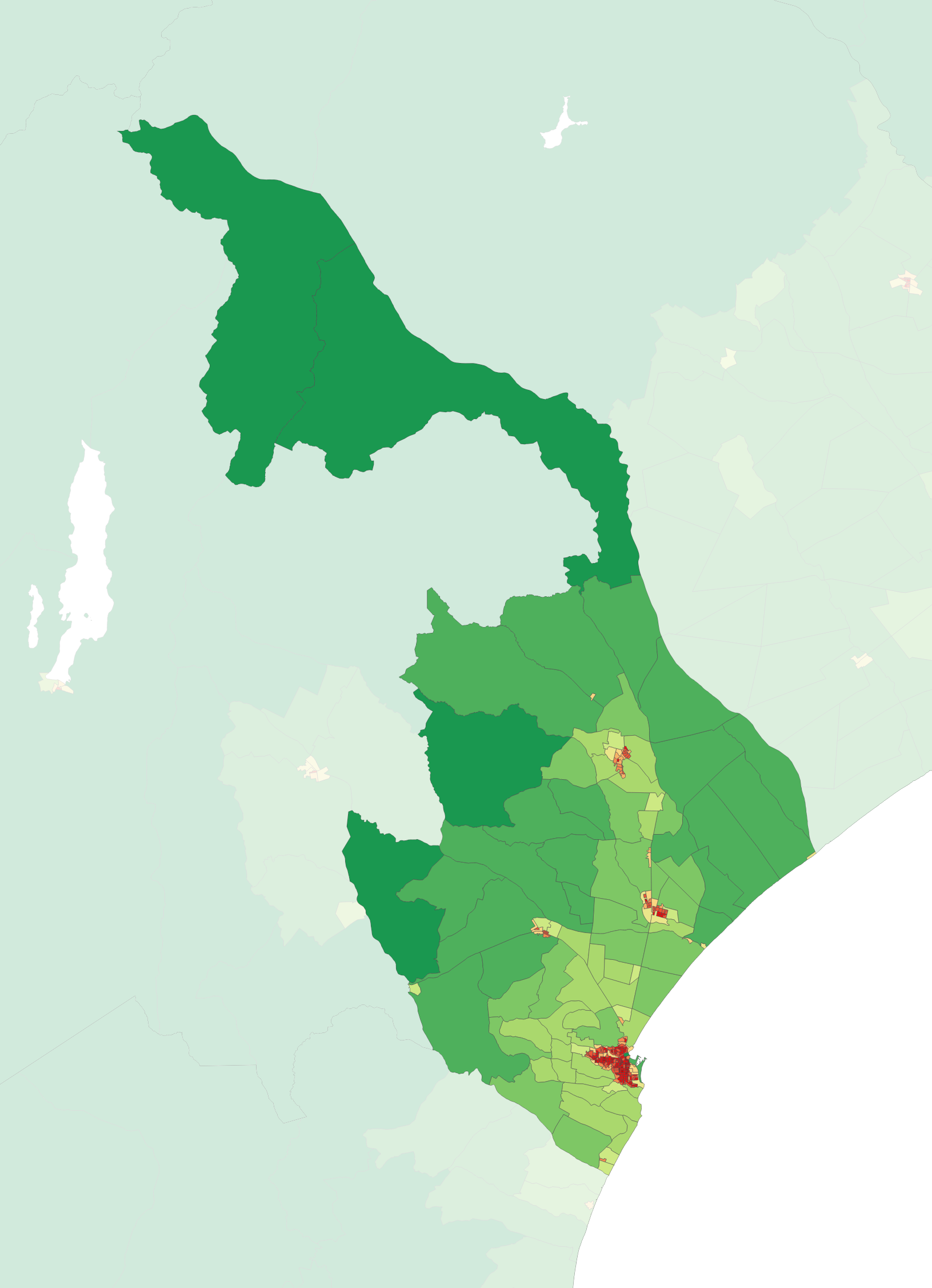
Population density in the 2023 census

Individual wards
Name	Area (km^{2})	Population	Density (per km^{2})	Dwellings	Median age	Median income
Geraldine Ward	1,643.63	6,162	3.7	2,595	49.5 years	$36,900
Pleasant Point-Temuka Ward	832.16	9,540	11.5	3,984	45.8 years	$38,600
Timaru Ward	256.62	31,845	124.1	13,182	43.3 years	$39,000
New Zealand					38.1 years	$41,500

== History ==
Timaru has its origins in a sheep station, The Levels, run by George Rhodes. In 1868, residents petitioned for the town to be established as a borough, and the Timaru Borough Council was proclaimed in 1868.

== Economy ==
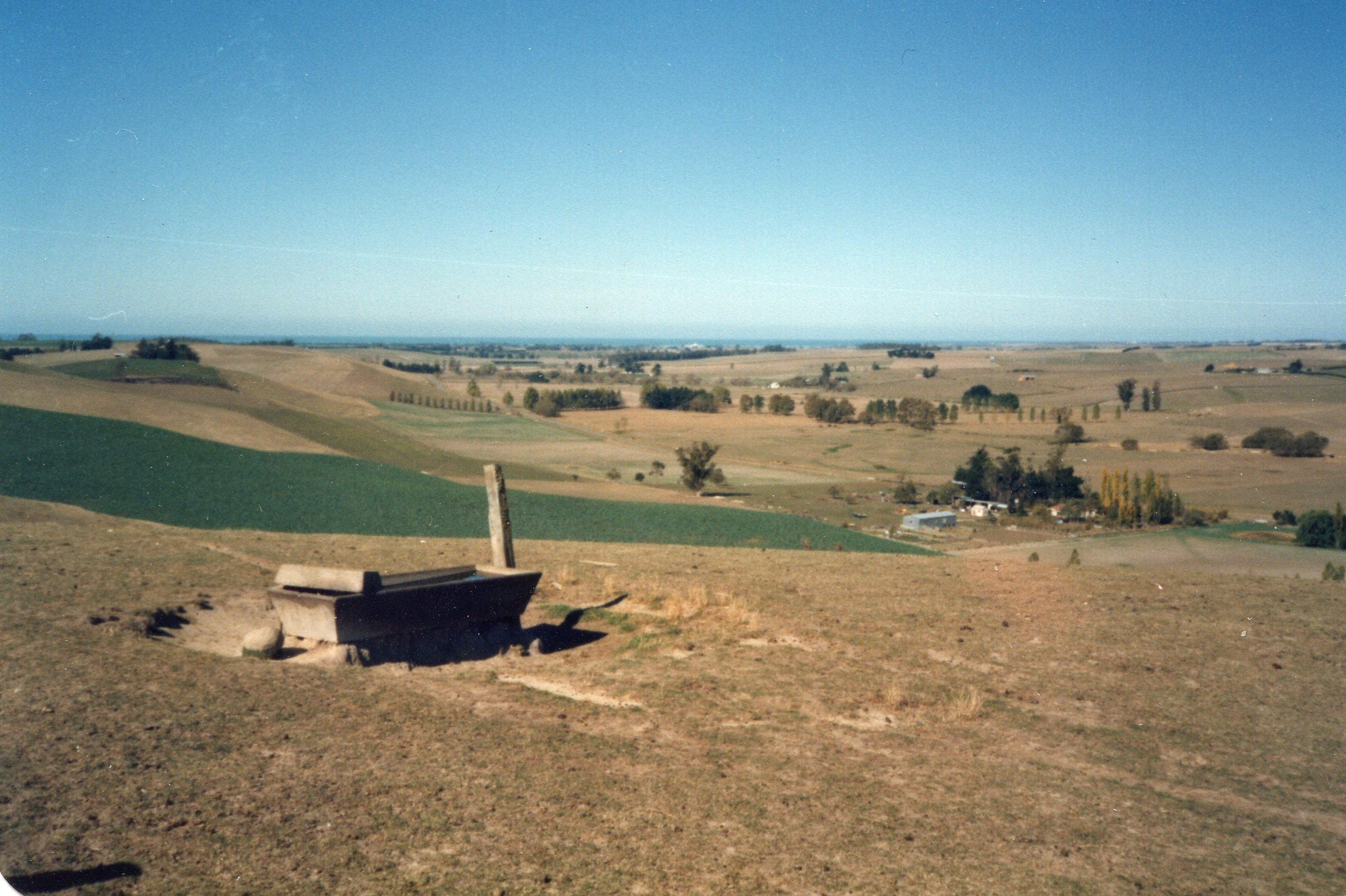
Levels Valley, NW of Timaru

Venture Timaru is the regional development and tourism organisation.
