= Mayor of Timaru =

Head of a municipal government in New Zealand

- Incumbent; Nigel Bowen since 2019
- Style: His/Her Worship
- Seat: 2 King George Place, Timaru
- Term length: Three years
- Inaugural holder: Samuel Hewlings
- Formation: 1868; 158 years ago
- Deputy: Scott Shannon
- Salary: $142,005
- Website: Official website

The mayor of Timaru is the directly elected head of the Timaru District Council, the local government authority for the Timaru District in New Zealand, which it controls as a territorial authority.

== List of officeholders ==
There have been 40 mayors since the formation of the Timaru Borough Council in 1868. The current mayor is Nigel Bowen, who was first elected in the 2019 local elections.

	Name	Term	Notes
1	Samuel Hewlings	1868–1870	
2	Henry Cain	1870–1873	
3	George Cliff	1873–1875	
4	James Sutter	1875–1876	
(3)	George Cliff	1876–1879	second term
(4)	James Sutter	1879–1882	second term
5	John Jackson	1882–1886	
6	Moss Jonas	1886–1888	
7	David Mitchell Ross	1888–1891	
8	Andrew Sherratt	1891–1893	
9	Jacob Hill	1893–1896	
10	John James Grandi	1896–1898	
11	James Stephen Keith	1898–1899	
12	John Hole	1899–1901	
13	Charles Macintosh	1901–1902	
14	James Craigie	1902–1912	
15	Tom Hawkey	1912–1913	
16	William Angland	1913–1914	
17	Edwin Rowland Guinness	1914–1917	
18	James Maling	1917–1919	
19	William Chute Raymond	1919–1921	
20	Frank Rolleston	1921–1923	
21	George John Wallace	1923–1929	
(16)	William Angland	1929–1931	second term
22	Thomas W. Satterthwaite	1931–1936	
23	Percy Vinnell	1936–1938	died 1938
24	Percy Barnes Foote	1938	
25	William Glenholme Tweedy	1938–1942	
26	Stanley Hanan	1942–1950	died in office (Note: Died on 2 August 1950; elder brother of Ralph Hanan)
27	William Leslie Richards	1950–1953	(Note: Richards was deputy mayor to Hanan and councillors elected him mayor in September 1950 following Hanan's death. At the 1950 local elections in November 1950, Richards defeated Jack Satterthwaite, a son of former mayor Thomas W. Satterthwaite.)
28	Ronald Erle White	1953–1959	OBE (1959)
29	Muriel Hilton	1959–1962	née Venn; MBE (1976)
30	Charles Edward Thomson	1962–1965	
31	Durham Dowell	1965–1971	resigned (Note: Resigned during the first half of 1971 when he moved to Christchurch; elected to Christchurch City Council in the 1971 local election)
32	Ray Bennett	1971	MNZM (1996)
33	Russell Hervey	1971–1977	QSO (1982)
(32)	Ray Bennett	1977–1982	second term
34	Helene McIver	1982–1986	née Denford; MBE (1977)
35	Dave Walker	1986–1989	
36	Archie Houstoun	1989–1992	MBE (1992)
37	Wynne Raymond	1992–2004	
38	Janie Annear	2004–2013	ONZM (2014)
39	Damon Odey	2013–2019	
40	Nigel Bowen	2019–present	
