= George Edmund Butler =

Landscape and portrait painter (1872-1936)

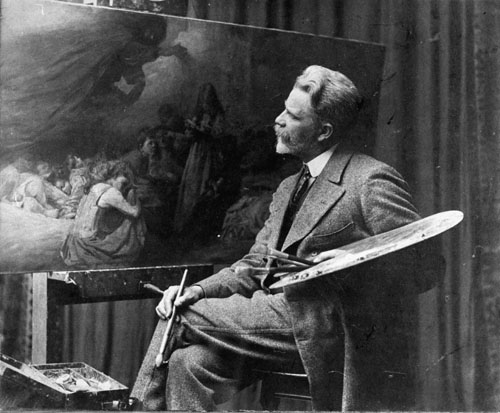
- George Edmund Butler at work
- Born: 15 January 1872; Southampton, England
- Died: 9 August 1936 (aged 64); Twickenham, England
- Known for: Painting

George Edmund Butler (15 January 1872 – 9 August 1936) was a landscape and portrait painter specialising in oils and watercolours. Born in England, his family emigrated to New Zealand when he was 11 years old. After completing his schooling, he studied art at the Wellington School of Design and at various schools in Europe . He returned to New Zealand and worked as a professional artist for a time before settling in England. He soon developed a reputation for portrait and landscape works. Late in the First World War, he became an official war artist in the New Zealand Expeditionary Force (NZEF), with the honorary rank of captain. He executed several works of senior officers of the NZEF and its battles after the war and died in England in 1936.

== Early life ==
Born 15 January 1872 in Southampton, England, George Edmund Butler emigrated to New Zealand with his parents, Joseph Cawte Butler and Jane Tiller, in 1883, settling in Wellington. After completing his education at Te Aro School, Butler worked for his father and studied art part-time under James Nairn at the Wellington School of Design.

== Art education ==
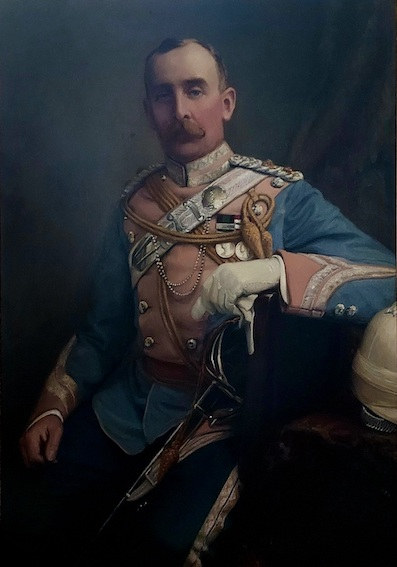
Lt.Col. Eustace Edward Melville Lawford, 1st Madras Lancers by George Edmund Butler

Butler enrolled at the Wellington School of Design in 1890. In 1892 he joined the avant-garde Wellington Art Club, founded by Nairn, and soon established a local reputation for his paintings of seascapes. In 1897, Butler went to Sydney with the Wellington art dealer McGregor Wright to study pictures in the National Art Gallery of New South Wales. Between 1898 and 1900, Butler undertook art studies abroad. During a period spent in England, Butler married his first wife, Sarah Jane Popplestone, on 29 April 1899 at Lyndhurst, Hampshire. Butler studied at the Lambeth School of Art, and the Académie Julian in Paris, where he gained honours. He later studied at the Antwerp Academy, winning a gold medal and laurel wreath in 1900.

== Art career ==
In 1900, Butler returned to Wellington and exhibited his work in art society exhibitions there and in Christchurch. In 1901 he settled in Dunedin and exhibited there until 1905. While his work won praise at the Otago Art Society exhibitions, he struggled financially as a professional artist. He supplemented his income by giving tuition in drawing and was commissioned to complete a number of portraits of city dignitaries. In 1905 he returned to England and settled in Bristol, teaching art at Clifton College. Butler was elected to the Royal West of England Academy in 1912 after establishing a reputation as a portrait and landscape artist in oils and watercolours. Butler also exhibited at the Royal Academy of Arts, the Royal Scottish Academy, the New Society of Artists and the annual salon exhibition at the Société des Artistes Français in Paris.

== War artist ==
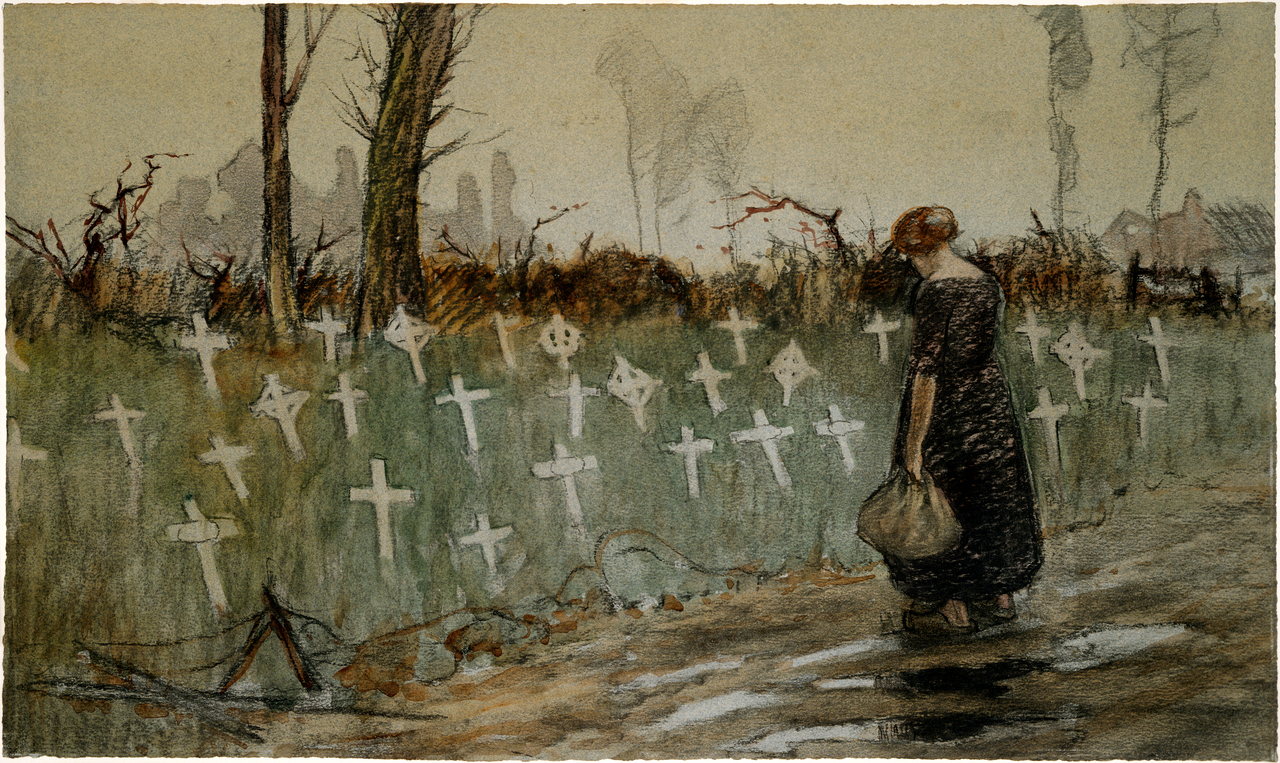
A roadside cemetery near Neuve Eglise, a painting by George Edmund Butler

The New Zealand Expeditionary Force War Museum Committee approached Butler to be an official New Zealand war artist because of his reputation as an artist and his New Zealand connections. Appointed with the honorary rank of captain in the New Zealand Expeditionary Force (NZEF) in September 1918, he joined the New Zealand Division in France later that same month. He observed a number of military operations, some while under fire, during his time with the division, making drawings in a sketchbook carried for this purpose. These sketches later became the basis for his paintings. After the Armistice, he returned to France and Belgium to sketch the various New Zealand battlefield sites.

Demobilised from the NZEF on 31 December 1918, Butler was privately commissioned by Robert Heaton Rhodes and Major General Sir Andrew Hamilton Russell, commander of the New Zealand Division, to do a further series of senior officer portraits and a number of large landscapes of New Zealand battlefield site along the Western Front. It was Rhodes's intention to persuade the New Zealand government to purchase these works. This was agreed to in September 1921 and payment to Butler was approved, including the purchase of a further two large works and 26 smaller paintings recommended by the New Zealand High Commissioner to the United Kingdom, Sir James Allen. These works are now held at the National Archives in Wellington.

== Second marriage and death ==
Butler never returned to New Zealand after the war and resumed life in England. Following the death of his wife in 1928, he married Monica Susan Boyce in London on 29 April 1929. He died at Twickenham on 9 August 1936. He was survived by his second wife and the two children from his first marriage, Bernice and Brian.
