= Geraldine High School =

Coordinates: 44.0918°S 171.2486°E

- Te Kura Tuarua O Raukapuka

Location
- 93 McKenzie Street, Geraldine 7930

Information
- Motto: Latin: Labor Omnia Vincit (Work conquers all)
- Established: 1963
- Ministry of Education Institution no.: 352
- Principal: Marcus Cooper
- Staff: 50–99
- Years offered: 7–13
- Gender: Coeducational
- Enrolment: 593 (July 2026)
- Houses: Acland; Cox; MacDonald; Tripp
- Socio-economic decile: 8
- Website: geraldinehs.school.nz

Geraldine High School (Māori: Te Kura Tuarua o Raukapuka) is a co-educational state secondary school located in Geraldine, South Canterbury, New Zealand. The school serves students from Years 7 to 13 and from both the town of Geraldine and the surrounding rural communities.

== History ==
From the passage of the Education Act of 1877 to 1901, local residents of Geraldine worked to gain approval for establishment of a district high school in Geraldine, raising the status of the Geraldine Primary School. The origins of Geraldine High School trace back to January 1902 with the establishment of the Geraldine District High School. At that time, 27 students were enrolled in the high school.

In 1906 the school building was destroyed by fire, and for seventeen months, the seniors met in the town's Volunteer Hall and juniors met in the Oddfellows Hall. Unfortunately, the low numbers resulted in the closure of the high school in 1909. In 1915, it was reopened in the Oddfellows Hall, with twenty students attending.

In 1963, the institution was restructured and officially became Geraldine High School, expanding its facilities and curriculum to accommodate a growing student population.

== Campus ==
Situated at 93 McKenzie Street, the school has undergone significant developments over the years. A notable recent project includes the construction of a new gymnasium, completed in early 2025, funded by the Ministry of Education.

== Academic programmes ==
Geraldine High School offers a comprehensive curriculum aligned with the New Zealand National Curriculum. The 2023 report of the Education Review Office listed strengths as:

- Facilitated opportunities to engage Māori whānau inform school reviews to bring about improvements.
- Analysis of data, including student voice, is used to track achievement and inform teaching and learning.
- A shared vision for learning has been collaboratively developed which is bringing about consistency of teaching for increasingly engaged learners.
- Professional learning in tikanga and te reo Māori, developing growth mindsets, learning design, and effective feedback, is aligned with goals and initiatives identified for improvement.

Students work towards the National Certificate of Educational Achievement (NCEA) across various subjects. In addition to traditional academic courses, the school provides vocational programmes, including a Building Academy introduced in 2025.

== Leadership ==
As of 2025, the principal of Geraldine High School is Marcus Cooper.

== Student Houses ==
Geraldine High School has four student houses: Acland, Cox, MacDonald and Tripp.

The houses form part of the school's student leadership and inter-house activities, with each house represented by a student House Leader. Inter-house competitions include athletics, swimming and cross country, as well as other school events.

House points are awarded throughout the year for participation and achievement in inter-house events. The points are tallied at the end of the year, with the house accumulating the most points awarded the Geraldine High School Inter-house Trophy.

== Notable alumni ==
- Mark Inglis – Mountaineer and motivational speaker; the first double amputee to summit Mount Everest.
- John Badcock – New Zealand artist known for his portraiture and expressionist style.
- Jordan Luck – Musician and frontman of the rock band The Exponents.
- Gus Spillane – Former All Black rugby player.
- Peter Williams – Broadcaster and journalist.
- Dave Bishop – Rugby union referee.
- Peter Henry – Olympic bobsledder.

== See also ==
- List of schools in New Zealand
- Education in New Zealand
