= The Vicarage Geraldine =

Historic building in Geraldine, New Zealand

Vicarage Geraldine
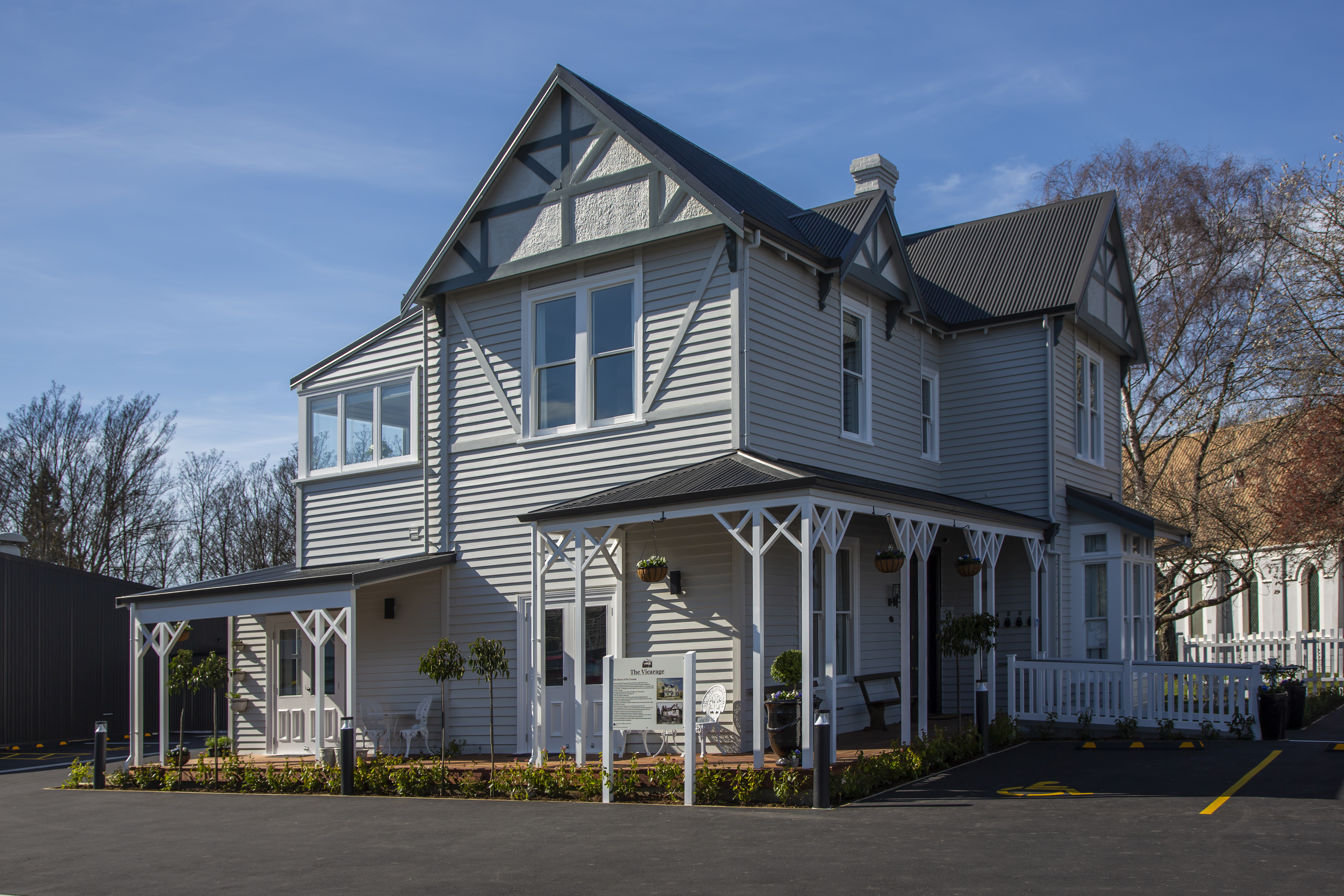
- The Vicarage Geraldine in 2019
- Interactive map of the Vicarage Geraldine area
- Former names: St Mary's Vicarage

General information
- Type: Vicarage
- Architectural style: Arts and Crafts
- Location: 69 Talbot Street, Geraldine, New Zealand
- Completed: 1900
- Renovated: 2017–2019
- Closed: late 2017 – September 2019
- Owner: Michael and Brigitte Barker

Technical details
- Floor count: two

Design and construction
- Architect: James S. Turnbull

Website
- Official

Heritage New Zealand – Category 2
- Designated: 23rd June 1983
- Reference no.: 2022

References
- "St Mary's Church Vicarage". New Zealand Heritage List/Rārangi Kōrero. Heritage New Zealand.

The Vicarage Geraldine is an historic building and boutique hotel in Geraldine, New Zealand. Formerly the St Mary's Church Vicarage, it was built in an Arts and Crafts style in 1900 for the vicar of neighbouring St Mary's Anglican Church, and was home to 15 vicars and their families until the last vacated in 2009. The former vicarage was then rented out for several years, and fell into disrepair. It was sold in 2017 by the Anglican Church to Michael Barker of Barker Fruit Processors, and after significant renovations reopened in 2019 as boutique accommodation. It is a category II historic building registered with Heritage New Zealand.

== History ==
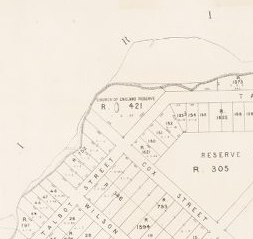
1874 survey map of Geraldine showing Reserve 421

When Samuel Hewlings surveyed the site of Talbot Forest, later Geraldine, in 1862, he set aside 1.5 acres (0.61 ha) for an Anglican church, in a plot named Reserve 421. The Reverend George Foster had been appointed by the Christchurch Diocese in 1859 to minister to the very large Timaru District, which necessitated large amounts of travel. Recognising the demands of this, the district was divided and in 1862 Laurence Lawson Brown was appointed the first vicar of the Geraldine District. Brown was provided with a vicarage in Waihi Bush (Woodbury), on land gifted by Alfred Cox.

In Geraldine St Mary's, a wooden church with a square tower, was built on Reserve 421 in 1863 to accommodate 100 worshippers. Brown died in 1870 and was succeeded by James Preston as vicar for the newly created Geraldine parish. Preston was initially based in Temuka, but in 1875 moved to a vicarage on 20 acres (8.1 ha) of land on Cox Street, about 1.5 miles (2.4 km) from the church. St Mary's was soon outgrown by the needs of the expanding town, and a larger Gothic stone church was built nearby in 1882 (the present-day St Mary's) and consecrated in August 1883. The original St Mary's continued to be used as a church hall and Sunday school.

Resident Vicars
| Vicar | Residency |
|---|---|
| S. Hamilton | 1900–1920 |
| H. Purchas | 1920–1930 |
| J.E. Coursey | 1931–1938 |
| A.H. Norris | 1938–1945 |
| H.A. Childs | 1945–1951 |
| F.O.B. Lane | 1951–1954 |
| C.E. Tanner | 1955–1960 |
| Bob Lowe | 1960–1963 |
| M.M. Warren | 1963–1968 |
| T.A. McKenzie | 1969–1974 |
| R.H.S. Smith | 1974–1985 |
| W.J. Gaudin | 1986–1995 |
| B.J. Thomas | 1995–2000 |
| T.J. Innes | 2001–2004 |
| G.J.S. Hayhoe | 2006–2009 |

Reverend James Preston died in 1898, and was succeeded by Staples Hamilton in February 1899. Two months later, at the annual meeting of parishioners, the vicar argued that the vicarage built in 1875 was a mile and a half away from St Mary's, which necessitated up to twelve miles of walking on a Sunday; he announced that he intended to build a new, more convenient vicarage and church hall. After some objections from those in the community opposed to removing the old St Mary's church, it was agreed the vicarage would be built alongside; Hamilton had proposed the old St Mary's building instead be moved to Orari, which needed a church, with perhaps the bell tower remaining. (Note: After sitting beside the new vicarage for years, in 1906 the old St Mary's church building was eventually hauled, using three traction engines, to Orari, where it reopened as the Holy Trinity Church. It burnt down in 1925.) James S. Turnbull of Timaru was chosen as the architect, and tenders were invited for construction in December 1899.

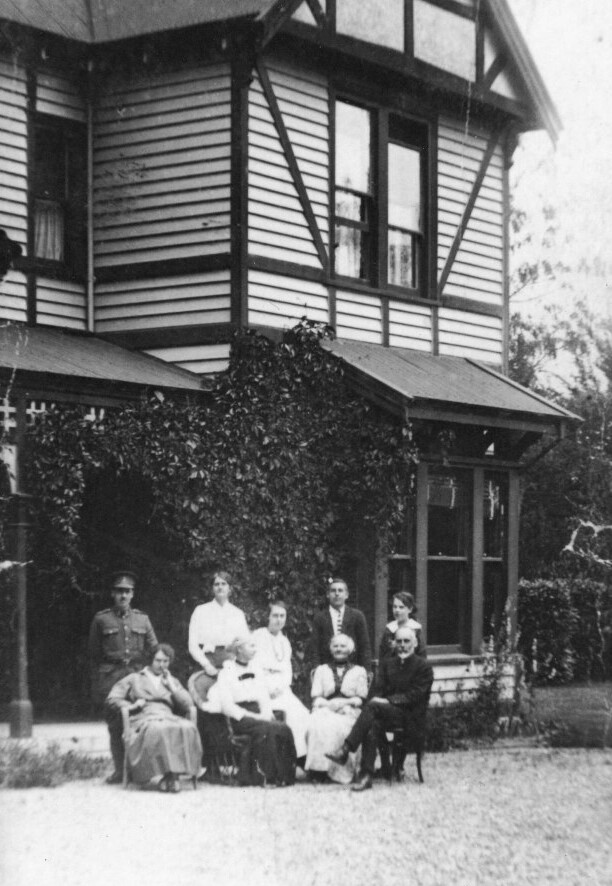
Staples Hamilton and family outside vicarage, 1916

Inflation over the course of 1899 had increased the building cost from £650 to £850. The old vicarage and glebe were sold for £505, and a loan of £250 was approved for building the new vicarage. A grand bazaar held over 15 and 16 December 1899 raised a further £130. The Church Property Trustees retained £100 from the sale to provide for pasture land for the vicar's horses, but did not release these funds—the vicar eventually had to lease grazing land in the adjoining riverbed. The builders Clinch & Lloyd were appointed, and the new building was constructed over 1900 with the vicar and his family moving in on 14 August of that year. It was officially opened on 11 October 1900. The vicarage was built of timber on a concrete foundation in an Arts and Crafts style, with a verandah on two sides, two storeys, and thirteen rooms. The interior hall and stairwell was panelled with rimu, and the rooms were lath and plaster. Leadlight windows, a gift of the architect, were installed over the door and on the landing. The ground floor contained a dining room, drawing room, study, and kitchen with pantry and scullery. Electric bells connected the front door, three rooms, and the kitchen. The upper story had five bedrooms, a linen closet, and a bathroom. Both bathroom and scullery had hot and cold running water, with dirty water being piped to an outside concrete channel which drained into the Waihi River. The vicarage was declared to be "built in up-to-date style, and … should prove of great convenience to the vicar and his parishioners." Stables and a workshop were added the following year, paid for by a gift auction.

In 1907 a church hall was built nearby, and in 1958 the church was extended. Fifteen vicars and their families resided in the vicarage over more than a century; the last resident vicar, G.J.D. Hayhoe, moved out in 2009. "The vicars got sick of living in there because it was cold and miserable," one of the current owners noted.

== Restoration ==
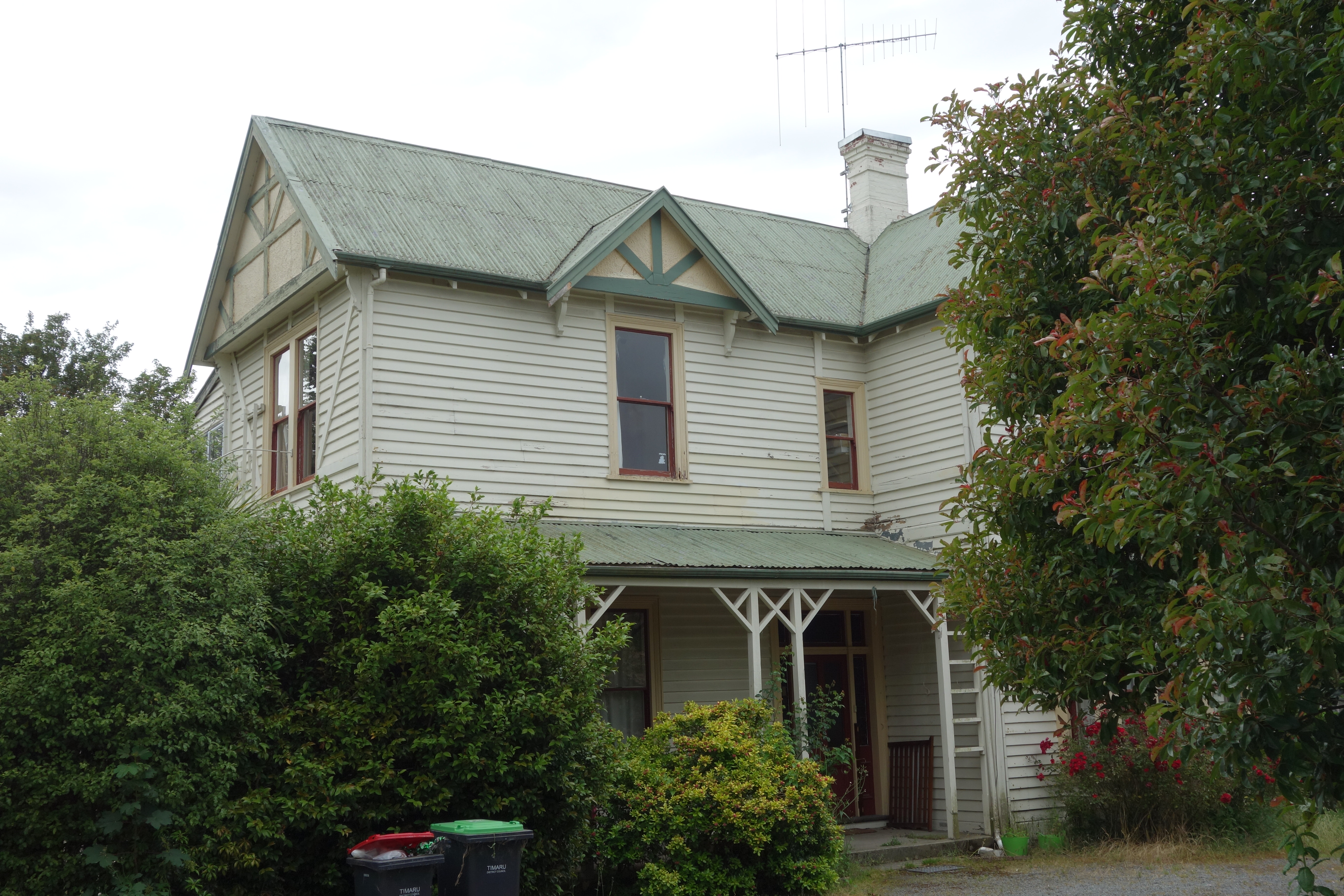
The vicarage before restoration

After being vacated, the building was rented out as a "party house", and became increasingly neglected and overgrown by trees and bushes. In 2017 the Geraldine parish resurveyed Reserve 421 and decided to sell the property, which was considered too cold, run-down, and expensive to maintain, and buy a new and more modern vicarage.

In late 2017 the property was purchased from the Anglican Church by Michael Barker (a director and former CEO of Geraldine-based Barker Fruit Processors), with the intention of building and leasing to the company a new food store and eatery on this site convenient to the centre of town. Barker and his wife Brigitte also drew up plans to renovate the former vicarage on the property and turn it into boutique accommodation. Barker presented his plans to the parishioners of St Mary's for approval, and the couple spent two years restoring the vicarage.

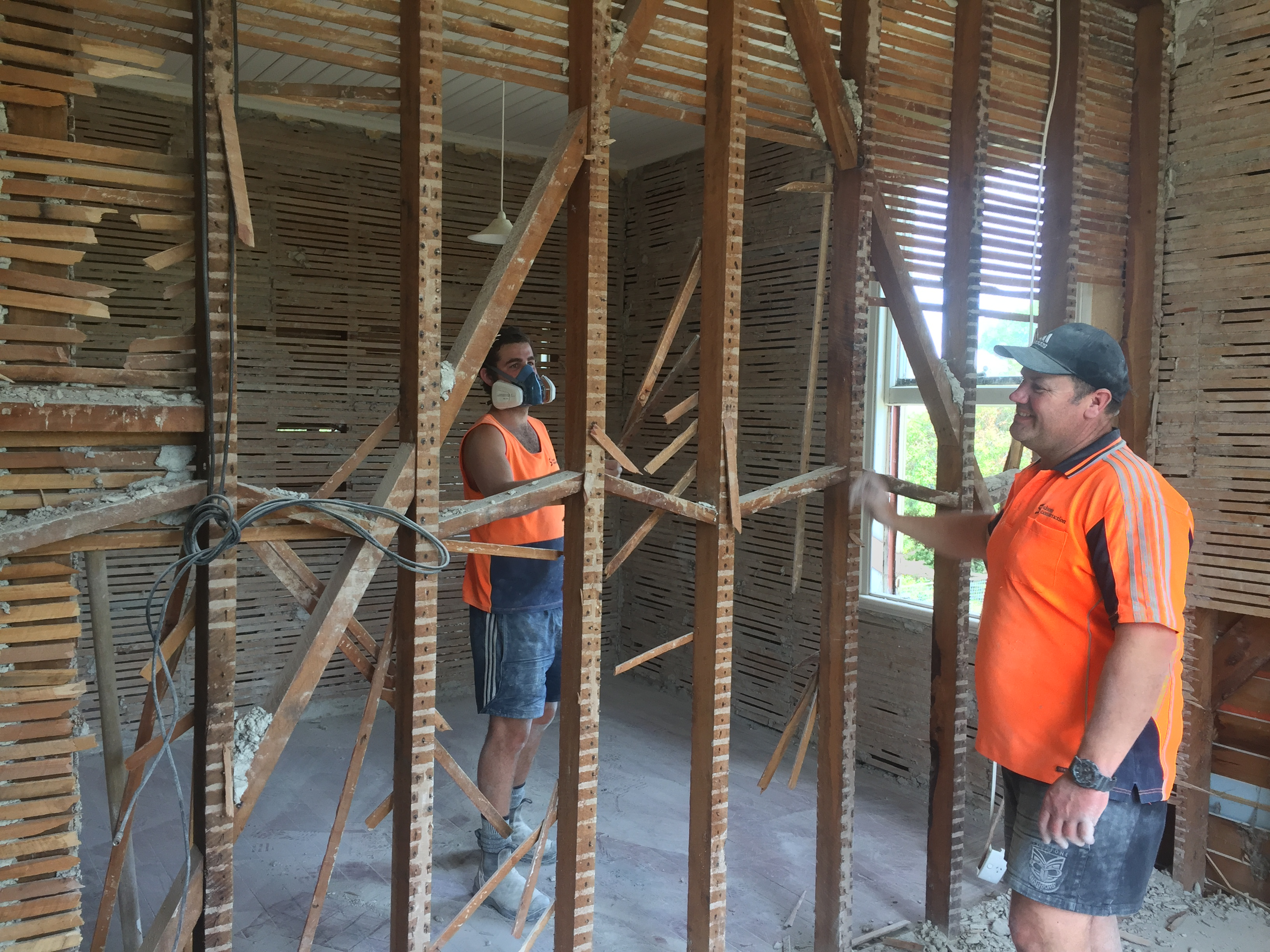
Builders removing lath and plaster

In November 2017 trees and shrubbery were removed to reveal the building and an archaeological assessment was carried out on the property. Stained glass was removed and repaired, a quarter of the weatherboards were replaced (including significant amounts of asbestos cladding), and the building was re-roofed. The insulation in the ceiling consisted of sawdust, laid on sheets of newspaper to prevent it from falling through the tongue-and-groove panelling; intact copies of The Timaru Herald from 1900 were recovered. Tonnes of lath and plaster were removed, stripping the building back to its frame, and it was strengthened to 100 per cent of modern building standards. The interior was relined, re-wired, and re-plumbed, with the original rimu panelling in the entrance way retained. The fireplaces also remained but were rendered non-functional, and modern fire doors with a traditional facade were installed. The interior in conjunction with designer Jane Rennie was decorated in English Cole & Son wallpapers, evoking the bright patterns from the time of the vicarage's construction.

The Barkers took care to preserve the social history of the vicarage, as the Barker family had lived in the area for five generations and, being Anglican, would have known every vicar. They commissioned local artist Stewart Gollan to create portraits of each vicar to hang in the rooms. Their restoration work was a finalist in the 2021 Canterbury Heritage awards in the category "domestic saved and restored".

The vicarage after restoration

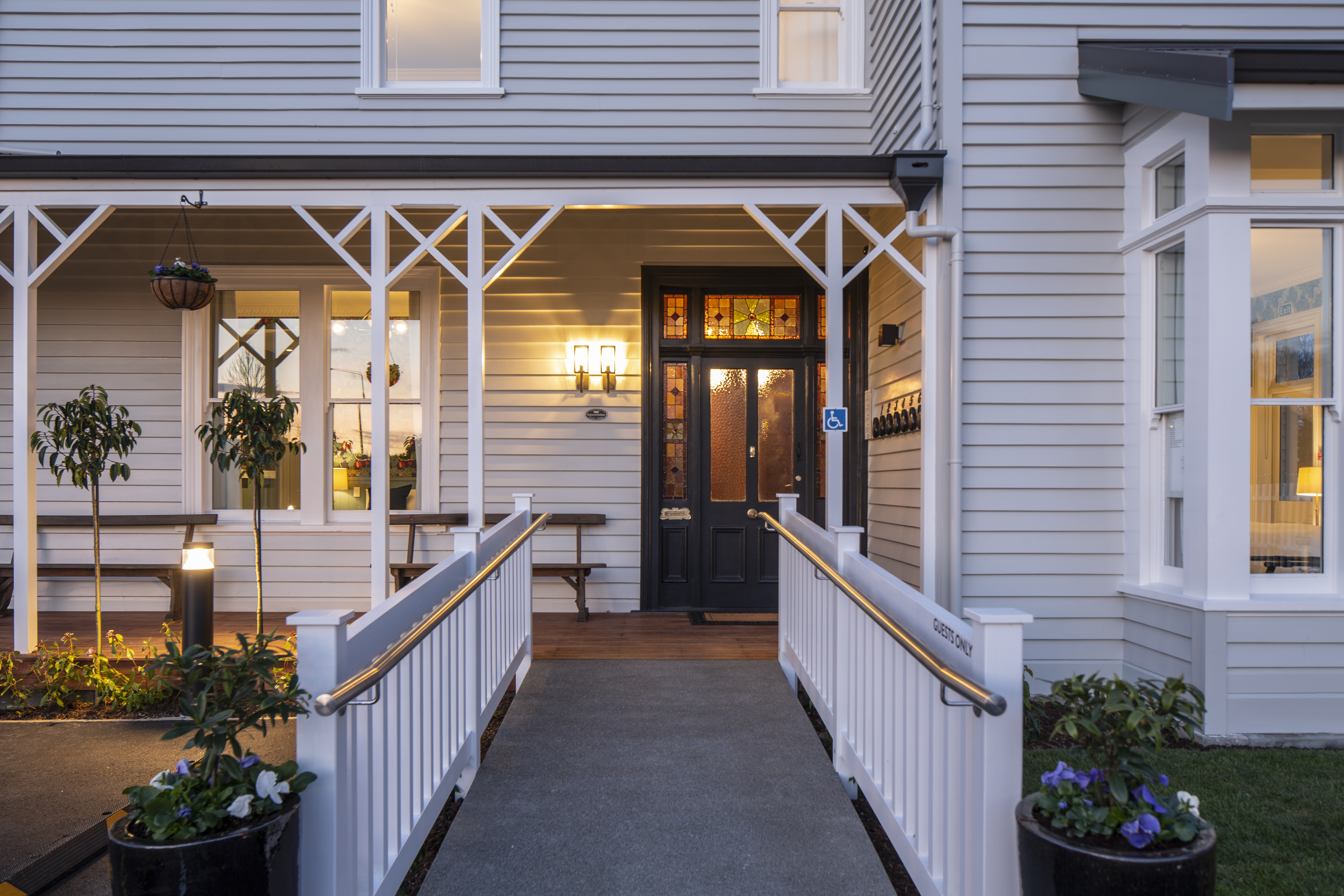
Entrance

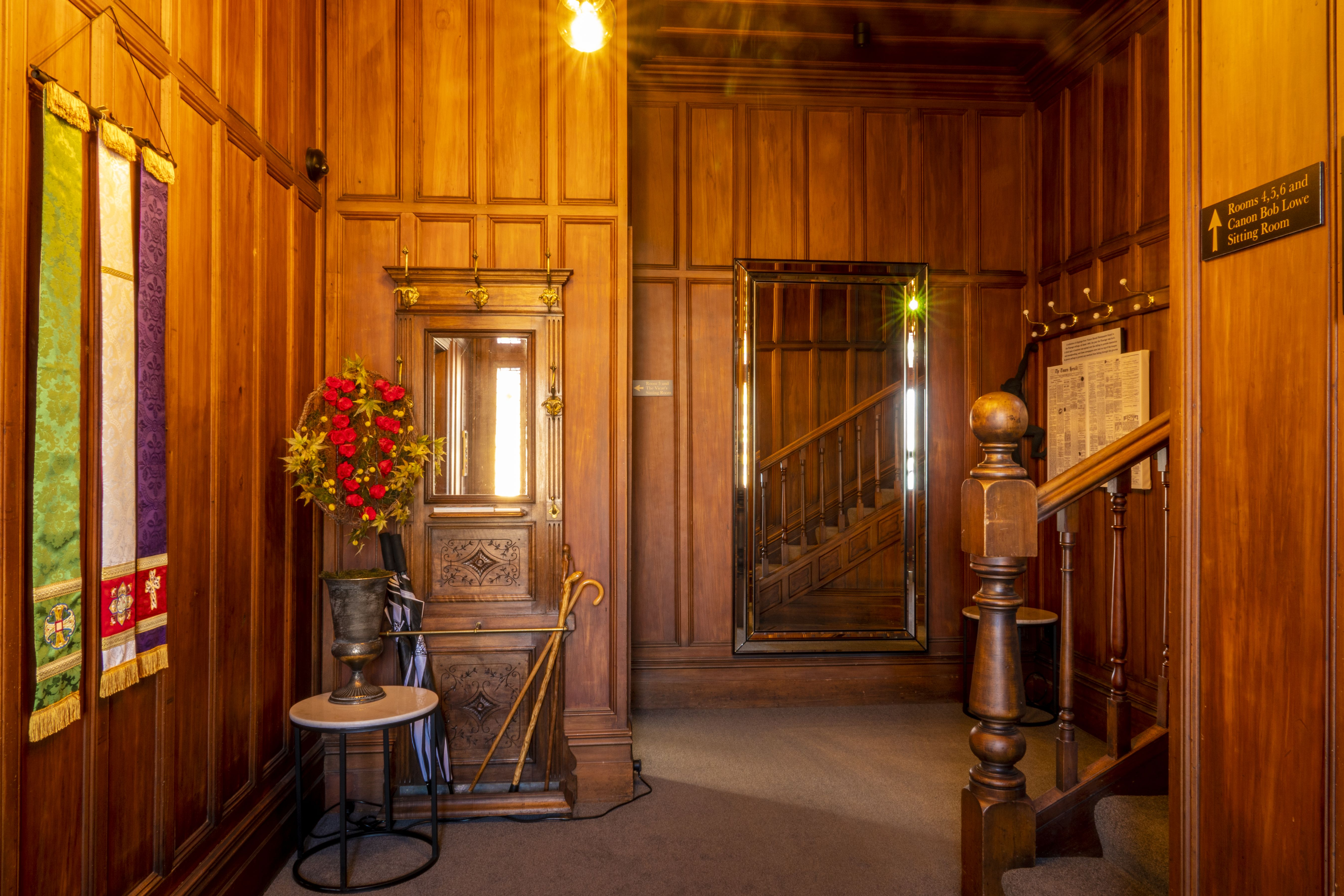
Hallway with rimu panels

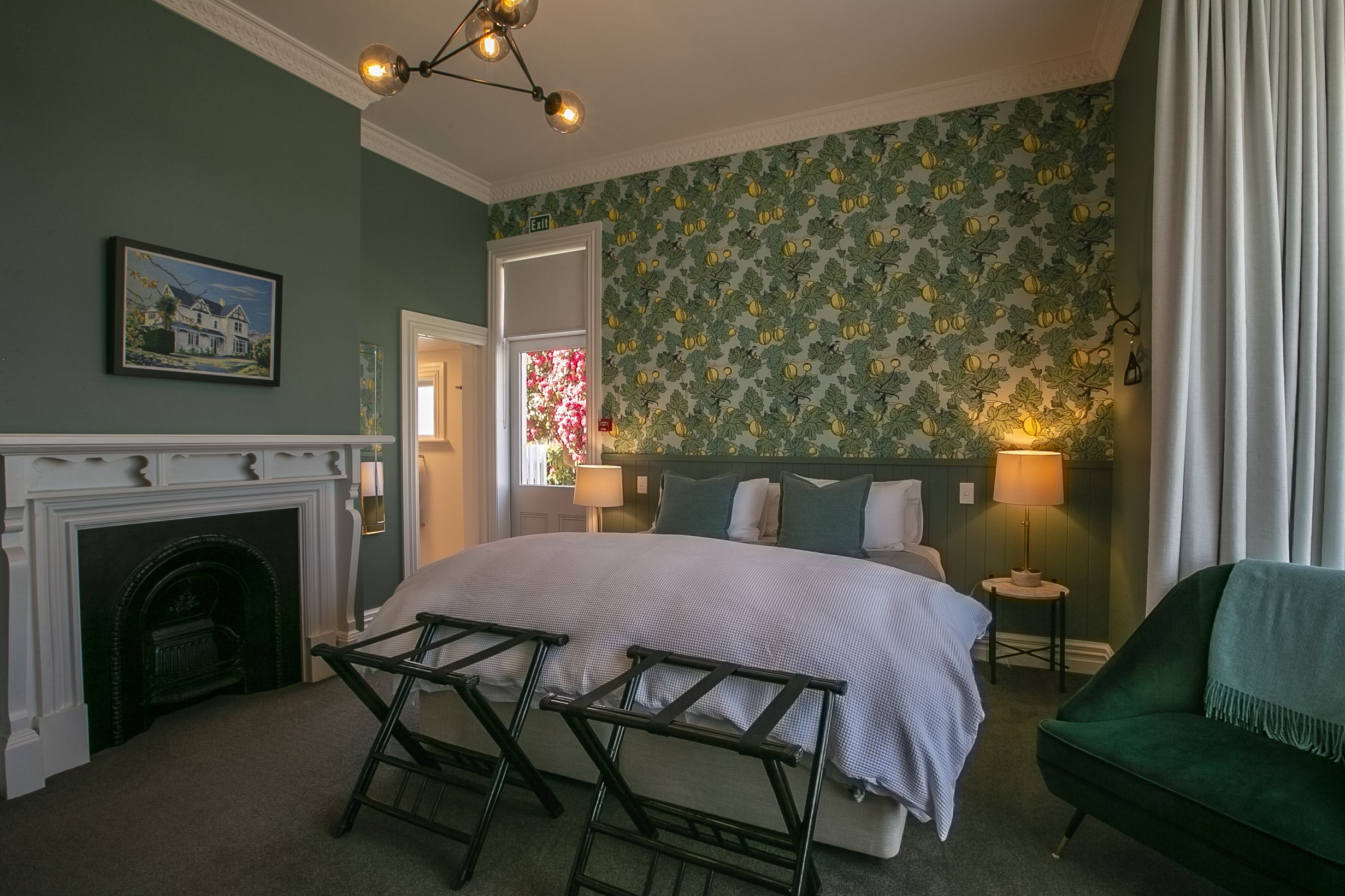
Renovated bedroom

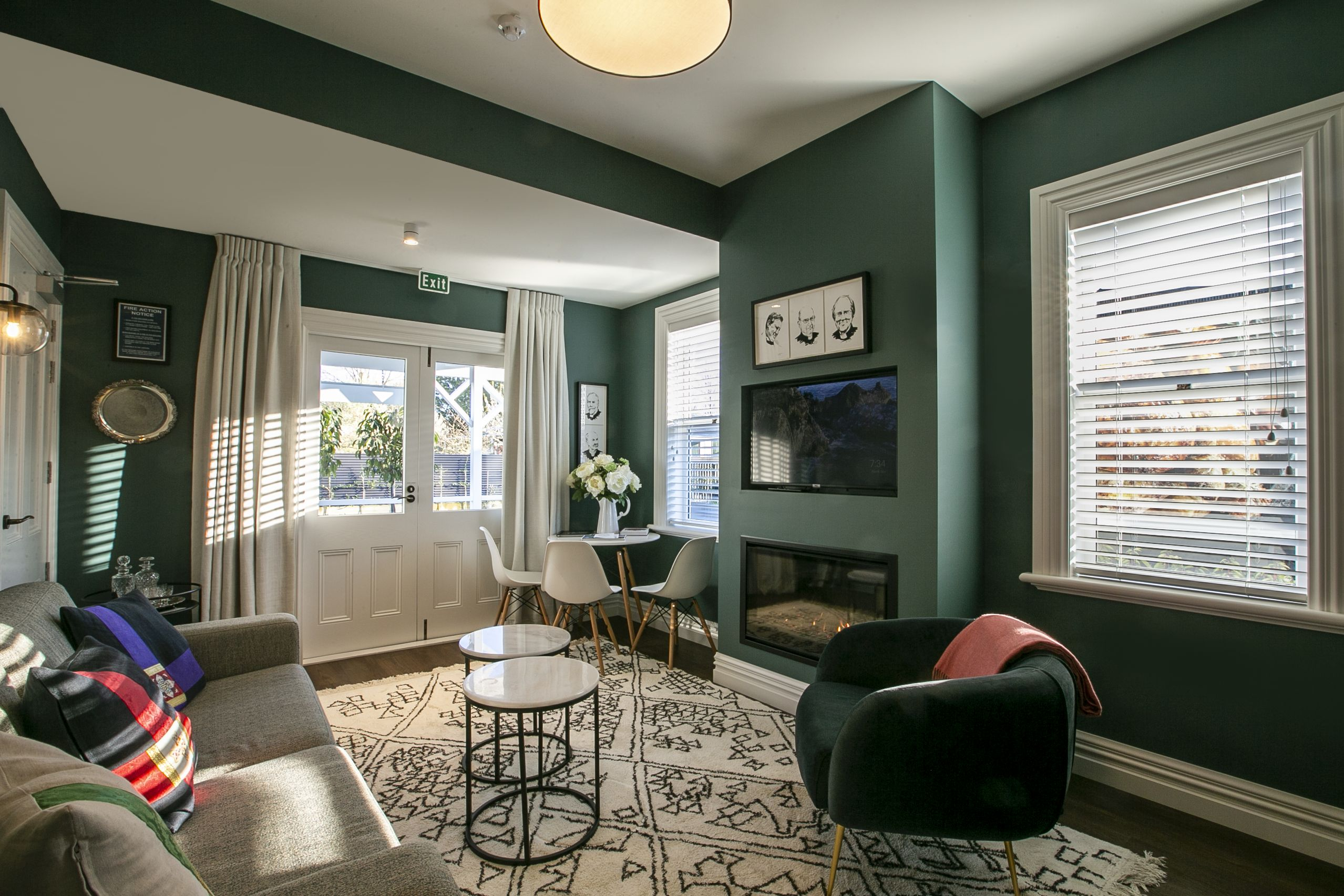
Upstairs sitting room

The restored Vicarage Geraldine, now with six ensuite bedrooms and two sitting rooms, was opened to the public on 28 September 2019, and 800 people attended the open day; the Barkers Food Store and Eatery adjacent to it had opened two weeks before, celebrating 50 years since the founding of the company. A few months after opening the Vicarage had to temporarily close due to the COVID-19 pandemic. In 2024 it received a 5-star Gold rating with Qualmark, the first in Timaru District.

== Heritage registration ==
On 23 June 1983 the building was registered by the New Zealand Historic Places Trust (now Heritage New Zealand) as a Category II historic building. Because of its heritage status, Heritage New Zealand needed to approve the plans for the vicarage's renovation.
