= Geraldine Cinema =

Cinema in Geraldine, New Zealand

Coordinates: 44.093°S 171.2451°E

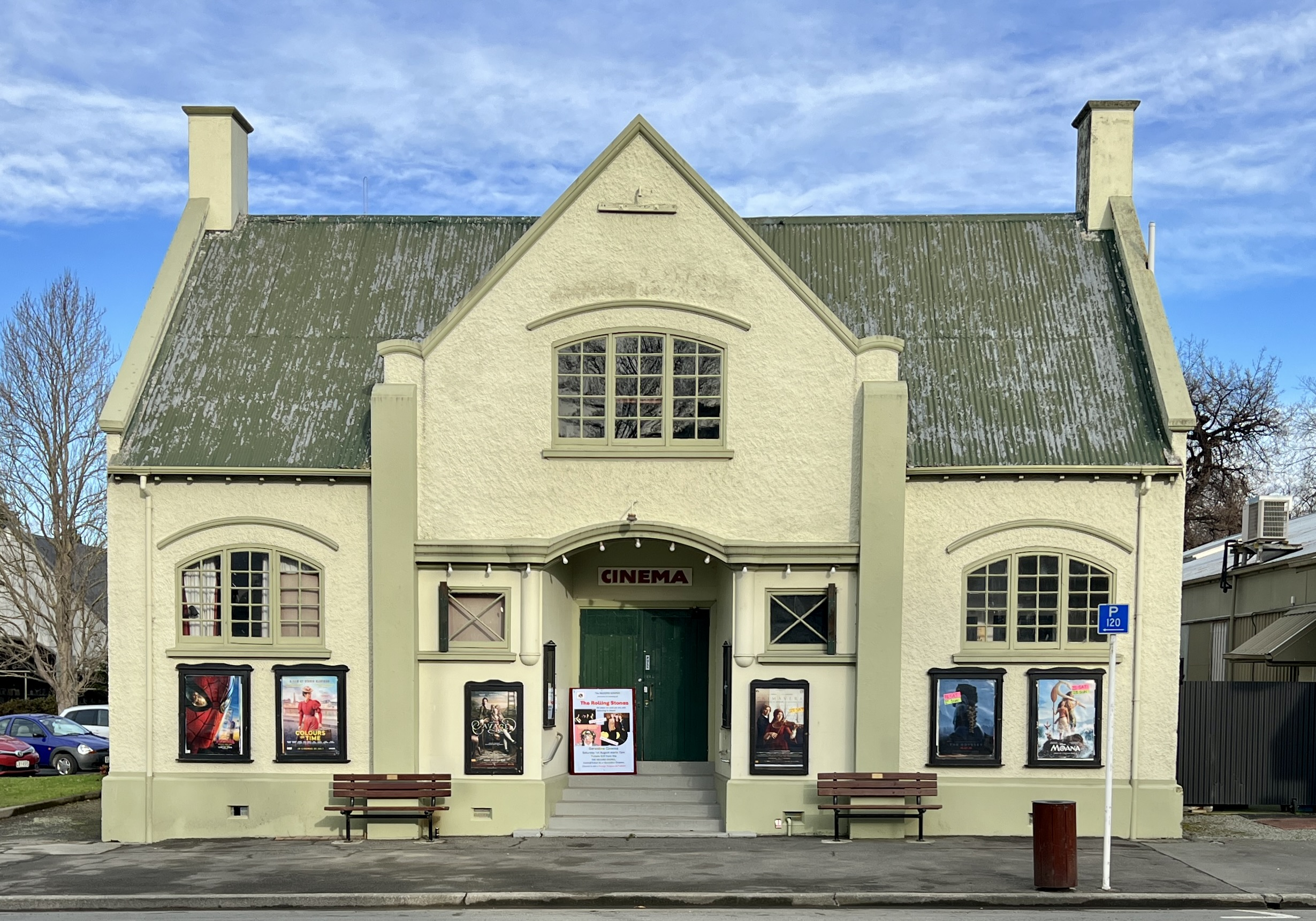
- Interactive map of the Geraldine Cinema area
- Former names: Geraldine Town Hall; Geraldine Municipal Theatre

General information
- Architectural style: Arts and Crafts
- Location: 78 Talbot Street, Geraldine, New Zealand
- Opened: 25 August 1925

Design and construction
- Architect: L. L. Miles

Other information
- Seating capacity: 300

Website
- www.geraldinecinema.co.nz

The Geraldine Cinema in Geraldine, New Zealand, was originally built as the town hall. It is one of the longest-running cinemas in New Zealand, operating for over 100 years.

== Construction ==
The building was designed in 1924 by Timaru architect Lancelot L. Miles to replace a World War I drill hall being used as the town hall. It was built for the Geraldine Borough Council by A. M. Fyfe, using some donated materials and volunteer labour, and was the first building in Geraldine to be wired for electricity and to use reinforced concrete. The new Town Hall opened on 25 August 1925 with a screening of the Tom Mix film North of the Yukon. As well as having a projection booth for silent films, the front ground-floor rooms housed the Geraldine library and reading room. Cuth Knight was employed as manager/caretaker, and he screened silent films for several years with proceeds going to the Council. The building was used for stage shows, newsreels, and civic events.

== History as a cinema ==
In late 1930 the Council decided it would be prohibitively expensive to install the sound equipment for screening talkies, and film screenings stopped. Knight offered to lease the hall and install sound equipment, and it reopened in 1931 as Geraldine Talkies, and later the Geraldine Municipal Theatre.

A new library and memorial hall built next door in 1960 allowed the former library space to be converted to indoor toilets (patrons formerly had to use outside toilets with exits either side of the stage).

It was operated as a cinema and dance hall for many years by Cuth Knight, before closing in 1967 as he reached retirement age and attendance dropped from competition with television. The building was unused until August 1970, when Barry McLauchlan approached the Council with a proposal to reopen it under the name Geraldine Cinema. The entire building had been stripped and had to be refitted with used carpet, seats, and screening and sound equipment. McLauchlan converted the former reading room into confectionery sales, and later a ticket booth. In the 1990s he began to replace the old 1970 seats with used couches, which became a trademark of the theatre.

Interior, showing couches

McLaughlan sold the business in 2010 to Deirdre and Calvin McKechnie, who in turn sold it in 2014 to Patrick Walsh. Walsh was at one point New Zealand's youngest cinema owner, having run lunchtime screenings on the school projector for 20c at Rangiora High School, going on to work as a projectionist, and buying the Regent Cinema in Rangiora at 21; the Regent was damaged by the Christchurch earthquakes and closed in 2013.

With the redevelopment of the Timaru Theatre Royal in 2021, Walsh was able to acquire 140 1920s theatre seats, replacing his oldest current seats but not the popular couches. The cinema also displayed his collection of vintage movie projectors.

In 2025 Isaac Jones took over the cinema, programming a mixture of films, live music, and DJ sets on Saturdays and Sundays.

== Heritage status ==
The building is recognised as a heritage building by the Timaru District Council district plan, along with around 135 other buildings, but is not yet recognised by Heritage New Zealand Pouhere Taonga, which might give it increased protection.
