= Geraldine, New Zealand =

Town in Canterbury, New Zealand

Geraldine Heratini (Māori)
- Town
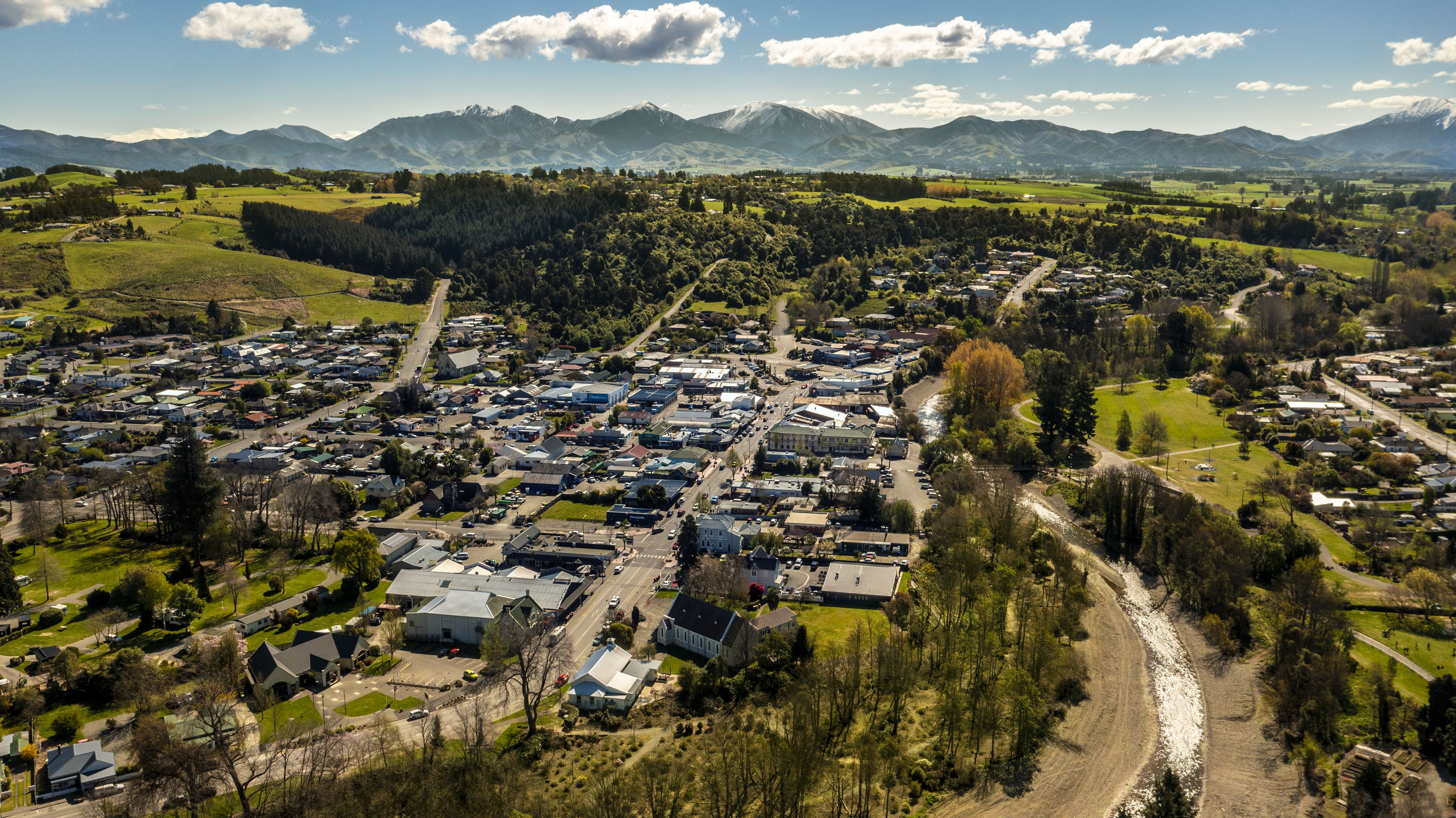
- Aerial view
- Interactive map of Geraldine
- Coordinates: 44°05′25″S 171°14′36″E
- Country: New Zealand
- Region: Canterbury
- Territorial authority: Timaru District
- Community board: Geraldine Community Board
- Ward: Geraldine
- Electorates: Waitaki; Te Tai Tonga (Māori)

Government
  - Territorial authority: Timaru District Council
  - Regional council: Environment Canterbury
  - Mayor of Timaru: Nigel Bowen
  - Waitaki MP: Miles Anderson
  - Te Tai Tonga MP: Mananui Ramsden

Area
  - Total: 3.22 km^{2} (1.24 sq mi)
- Elevation: 120 m (390 ft)

Population (June 2025)
  - Total: 3,070
  - Density: 953/km^{2} (2,470/sq mi)
- Time zone: UTC+12 (New Zealand Standard Time)
  - Summer (DST): UTC+13 (New Zealand Daylight Time)
- Postcode: 7930
- Area code: 03
- Local iwi: Ngāi Tahu

Geraldine (Māori: Heratini) is a town in the Canterbury region in the South Island of New Zealand. It is about 140 km south of Christchurch, and inland from Timaru 38 km to the south. Geraldine is located on State Highway 79 between the Orari and Hae Hae Te Moana Rivers and 45 kilometres to the east of Fairlie.

== History ==
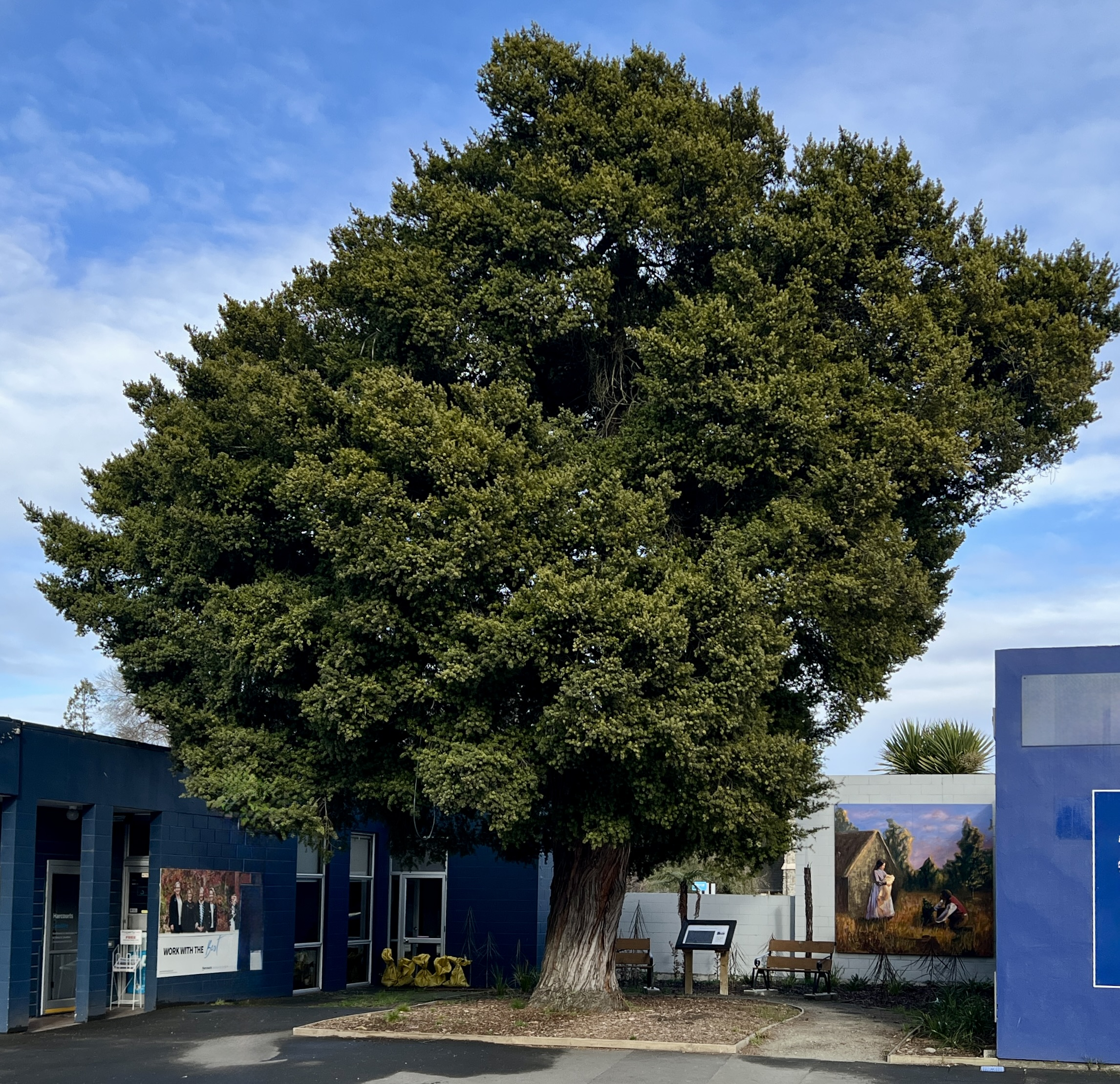
Hewlings tōtara tree, planted 1854

There is evidence of Māori travel through the Geraldine area, and artifacts and carvings have been discovered in the nearby areas of Beautiful Valley, Gapes Valley and Kakahu. The area was part of the continuous Canterbury Purchase or Kemp's Deed, where in 1848 over thirteen million acres were purchased by Henry Tacy Kemp on behalf of the Crown from Ngāi Tahu for £2,000. In 1849 following the purchase the colonial surveyor Charles Torlesse visited the region, but it was not until 1854 that Thomas Cass, the Chief Surveyor for the Canterbury region and Guise Brittan, Commissioner for Crown Lands, proposed a town site at what was known as Talbot Forest. Following this Samuel Hewlings, under the employment of the government as a surveyor, constructed a bark hut where the probably future site of a town would be. IA tōtara tree, planted to commemorate the birth of Hewling's daughter with his wife Nga Hei, stands opposite the police station near where his bark hut once stood. While Hewlings was the first to person to live in Geraldine, his was only there temporarily, and Alfred Cox and William du Moulin on the other side of the river at Raukapuka were the town's first permanent residents. Until 1857 the town was known as Talbot Forest. It was then named Fitzgerald in honour of James FitzGerald, the first Superintendent of the Canterbury Province, and later changed to Geraldine (though the exact reason for this is unknown). The name "Geraldine" was agreed at a meeting of the Province on 8 May 1857. Geraldine was a name that had been associated with the FitzGerald family for centuries.

Growth in the township was slow at first with separate towns being constructed: Healey Town in present-day south Geraldine, Maslin Town between Kennedy and Hislop Street, and the German settlement known as German Town on the Downs. By 1862 most of the main streets had been named and sections surveyed, and the area gazetted in 1867. At this time timber milling and the numerous sheep runs in the area were the main industry. The town experienced significant growth during this period and as the timber ran out farming took over as the major source of income in the area.

== Surroundings ==
=== Talbot Forest ===
Talbot Forest Scenic Reserve

Within walking distance of the town centre is Talbot Forest, the last remnant of the thousands of acres of native forest that once covered Geraldine and surrounding area. The forest has a high species diversity and contains mature examples of mataī, kahikatea and tōtara trees, including one estimated to be 800 years old.

Talbot Forest and other sites in the Geraldine area are home to a population of several hundred endangered native long-tailed bats, one of only two places on the East Coast of the South Island this species can are found. The bats roost in cavities in the largest forest trees, which can be protected from climbing predators with metal bands. The volunteer Talbot Forest Working Group work with the Department of Conservation to monitor the bats with radio transmitters and organise public bat viewings on summer nights.

=== Native reserves ===
The Geraldine area is home to numerous native forest reserves. These include Kakahu Bush Reserve, Orari Gorge Scenic Reserve, Peel Forest Park Scenic Reserve, Pioneer Park Conservation Area, Tenehaun Conservation Area, and Waihi Gorge Scenic Reserve.

== Education ==
Geraldine has two schools:

- Geraldine Primary School is a state contributing (Note: Years 1–6) school, with 269 students.
- Geraldine High School is a state secondary school that provides for students years 7 through 13, with 593 students.

Both schools are co-educational. Rolls are as of July 2026.

A private school operated in Geraldine from 1862. A public school opened in 1867 and moved to a new building in 1872, and moved again to the present primary school site in 1880. It became Geraldine District High School in 1902. In 1906 it was destroyed in a fire, and rebuilt in 1908. The secondary department was closed in 1909, and restored in 1915. In 1963 the school was divided into Geraldine Primary on the existing site, and Geraldine High School on a new site. Orari School (established 1879) and Hilton School (established in 1875 as Kakahu School) merged with Geraldine Primary in 2005.

== Government ==
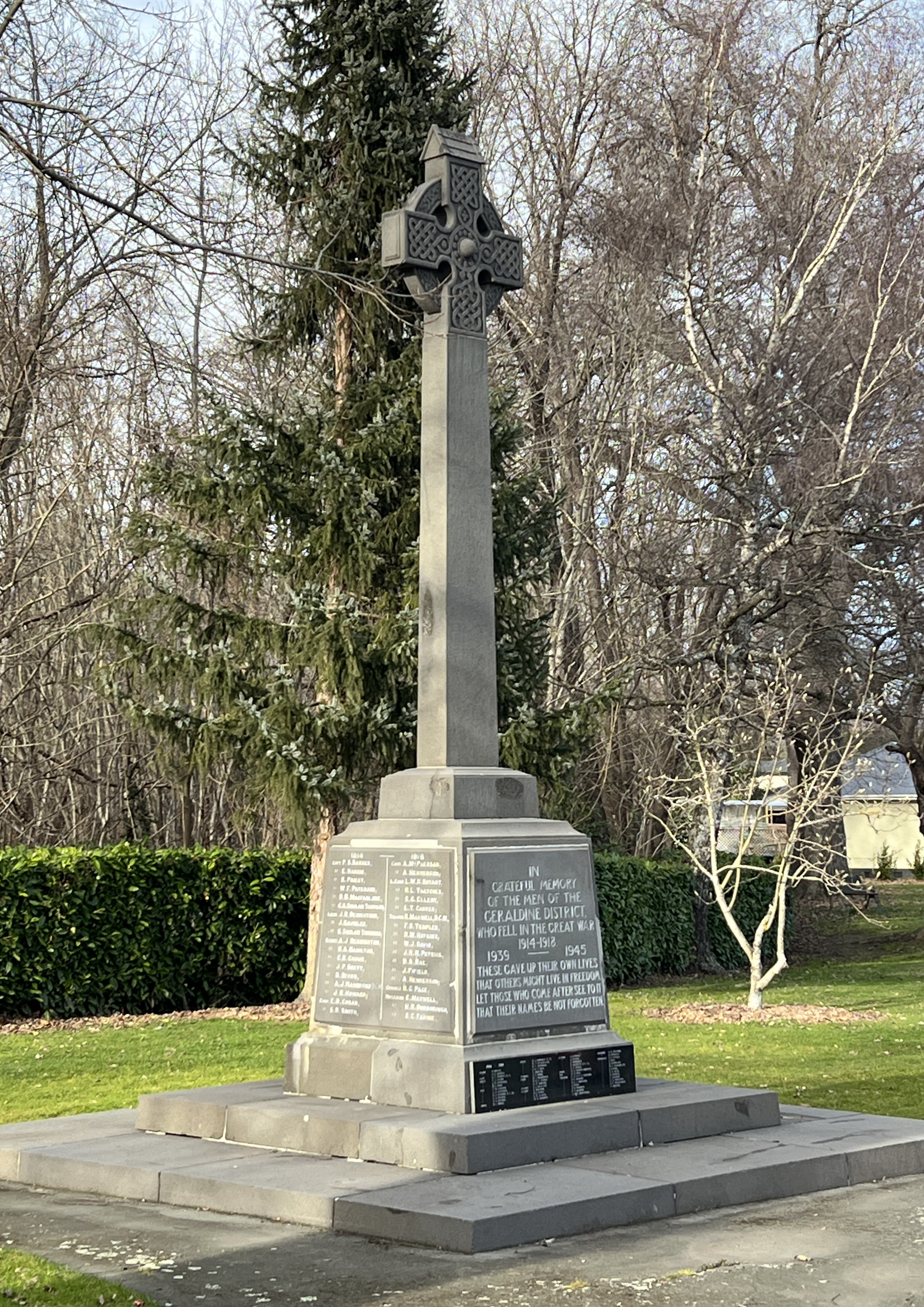
Geraldine War Memorial

=== Local government ===
Geraldine became a Town District in 1884, operating out of the historic Town Board Office. On 22 December 1904, Geraldine was constituted a borough, and the first mayor, William Maslin, was elected on 22 February 1905. In the local government reforms of 1989, Geraldine became part of Timaru District. The town had 16 mayors during the 85 years that it was a borough; the following is a complete list:

	Name	Portrait	Term of office
1	William Maslin		1905–1907
2	James Maling		1907–1909
3	Frederick Flatman		1909–1911
4	John Kennedy		1911–1915
5	Patrick Wood Hislop		1915–1917
6	Fergus Paterson		1917–1918
7	Beauchamp Macdonald		1918–1921
8	Edward Hardcastle		1921–1923
(4)	John Kennedy		1923–1931
(7)	Beauchamp Macdonald		1931–1938
9	John Robert Lack		1938
10	Douglas McKechnie		1939–1948
11	Percy Henry Davis		1949–1955
12	Cyril Stewart Davies		1955–1965
13	Bill Williamson		1965–1971
14	William Stewart Aitken		1971–1983
15	Eulla Williamson		1983–1988
16	James Hopa		1988–1989

The current mayor of Timaru District is Nigel Bowen. Geraldine is represented by a community board and a district councillor.

=== Central government ===
The Geraldine electorate was first formed in the 1875–1876 election, but would be twice disestablished and subsequently reestablished in the following years, before being abolished in the 1911 election. The electorate was represented by six Members of Parliament. The electorate split between the newly established Temuka electorate and the Ashburton electorate, with the majority of the land going to the latter. Following controversial boundary changes in 2008, the Aoraki electorate was abolished and Geraldine became part of the Waitaki electorate with its head office in Oamaru, despite nearby towns such as Temuka, Orari, and Ashburton joining the Timaru-based Rangitata electorate. Geraldine is currently part of the Waitaki electorate, held by Miles Anderson of the National Party.

== Demographics ==
Geraldine is described as a small urban area by Stats NZ. It covers 3.22 km^{2} (1.24 sq mi) and had an estimated population of 3,070 as of June 2025, with a population density of 953 people per km^{2}.

Historical population
Year	Pop.	±% p.a.
2006	2,397	—
2013	2,448	+0.30%
2018	2,883	+3.33%
2023	3,018	+0.92%
The 2006 population is for a smaller area of 3.12 km^{2}. Source:

In 1951, the population of Geraldine was 1080 people. This increased to 1640 people in 1956 and 1832 people in 1961.

Geraldine had a population of 3,018 in the 2023 New Zealand census, an increase of 135 people (4.7%) since the 2018 census, and an increase of 570 people (23.3%) since the 2013 census. There were 1,392 males, 1,620 females, and 6 people of other genders in 1,335 dwellings. 2.3% of people identified as LGBTIQ+. The median age was 53.2 years (compared with 38.1 years nationally). There were 468 people (15.5%) aged under 15 years, 345 (11.4%) aged 15 to 29, 1,143 (37.9%) aged 30 to 64, and 1,059 (35.1%) aged 65 or older.

People could identify as more than one ethnicity. The results were 91.8% European (Pākehā); 7.5% Māori; 2.0% Pasifika; 4.5% Asian; 0.6% Middle Eastern, Latin American and African New Zealanders (MELAA); and 2.8% other, which includes people giving their ethnicity as "New Zealander". English was spoken by 98.3%, Māori by 1.8%, Samoan by 0.1%, and other languages by 6.7%. No language could be spoken by 1.4% (e.g. too young to talk). New Zealand Sign Language was known by 0.6%. The percentage of people born overseas was 18.0, compared with 28.8% nationally.

Religious affiliations were 38.2% Christian, 1.1% Hindu, 0.3% Islam, 0.1% Māori religious beliefs, 0.1% Buddhist, 0.3% New Age, and 0.9% other religions. People who answered that they had no religion were 51.3%, and 7.9% of people did not answer the census question.

Of those at least 15 years old, 432 (16.9%) people had a bachelor's or higher degree, 1,392 (54.6%) had a post-high school certificate or diploma, and 720 (28.2%) people exclusively held high school qualifications. The median income was $31,500, compared with $41,500 nationally. 165 people (6.5%) earned over $100,000 compared to 12.1% nationally. The employment status of those at least 15 was 996 (39.1%) full-time, 378 (14.8%) part-time, and 36 (1.4%) unemployed.

== Entertainment and media ==
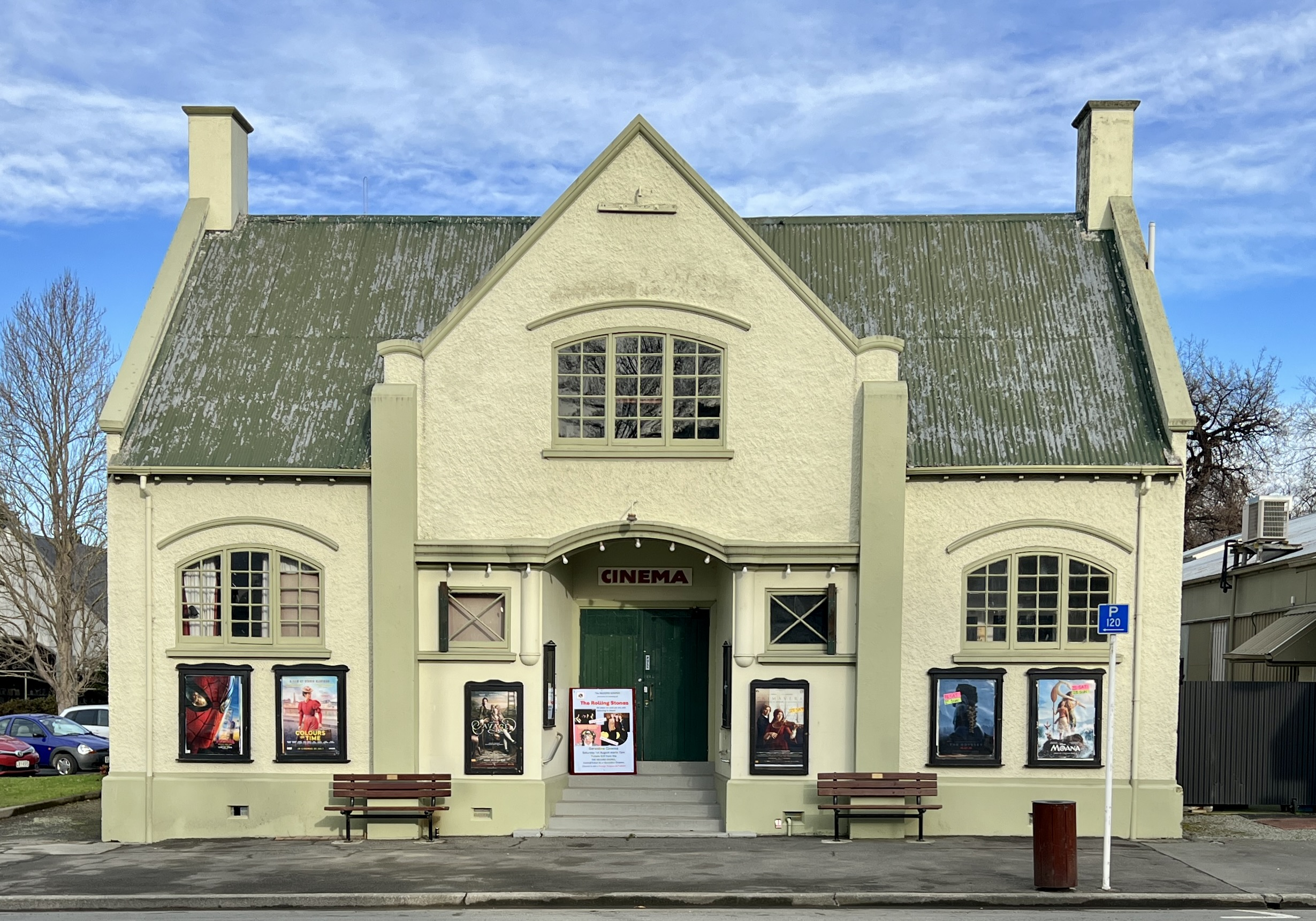
1924 Town Hall building, now the Geraldine Cinema

Movies are shown at the historic Geraldine Cinema on Talbot St, one of the longest-operating cinemas in New Zealand. Built in 1924 as the Town Hall, it was the first building in Geraldine to be wired for electricity, and included a projection booth for screening silent films. It opened on 25 August 1925 with a screening of North of the Yukon. Operated as a cinema and dance hall for many years by Cuth Knight before closing in 1967, it reopened in 1970 and has had several proprietors since. The cinema is well known for having a variety of couches in addition to standard cinema seating. There is a desire to see it become a registered historic building.

Geraldine's first radio station, Z100FM, operated in 1999–2000. This changed to Four Peaks FM in 2001. Just Country FM currently broadcasts from the town.

== Amenities ==
=== Library ===
The Geraldine Library is located at 80 Talbot Street, the town's main street. It is open Monday to Fridays and on Saturday mornings. In late 2021, the library was repainted and new carpet was installed. This was the first refurbishment that the library had received since it was first opened in 2003.

=== Golf courses ===
There are two golf courses in Geraldine: the Geraldine District Golf Course and the Grande Vue Golf Course.

=== Swimming pool ===
The Geraldine summer pool is an outdoor pool that is open between November and March each year. It is located on Cox Street. The complex features a heated 25 metre, six lane swimming pool, a learners' pool, and a toddlers pool. The Geraldine summer pool is home to the Geraldine Amateur Swimming Club which offers swimming lessons and also competes in various New Zealand swimming competitions.

=== Geraldine Domain ===
The Geraldine Domain is located between Cox Street and Talbot Street. At just over eleven hectares, the domain includes a playground, pavilion, gardens, and the Serpentine Creek. There are a number of sports grounds based at the domain, including grounds for playing cricket, football and athletics. There are also tennis courts, netball courts, and a bowls club. Fundraising was occurring in late 2021 to raise just over $1 million to redevelop Geraldine Domain. The aim of the project was to lay artificial turf to provide a hockey training facility. as well as install new cricket nets, new signage, storage facilities, floodlights, and parking.

== Economy ==
=== Agricultural ===
The agricultural industry is at the heart of the local economy. In the 1960s sheep farming was the most common type of farming, with some mixed farming (including wheat), dairy farming, and market gardening also present. While there has been a substantial increase in dairy farms in the region since 2000, there are still large sectors involved in the cropping, deer, sheep and beef. Many small local businesses service the needs of the surrounding agricultural industry. Large agricultural processing facilities operate in the area include Fonterra's Clandeboye facility and Barker's of Geraldine as well as numerous smaller industrial operations. Barker's both grows fruit and produces jams, chutney, sauces, syrups and blackcurrant juice from it.

=== Tourism ===
Geraldine sits on the highway many international and domestic tourists take on their way from Christchurch to the Mackenzie Country, Lake Tekapo, or the popular tourist destinations of Queenstown and Wānaka. There are numerous cafes, restaurants, and shops which cater for tourists all year round. The town is also home to various tourist operators which showcase the local natural environment such as rafting, horse trekking, and tours.

== Museums ==
=== Geraldine Historical Museum ===
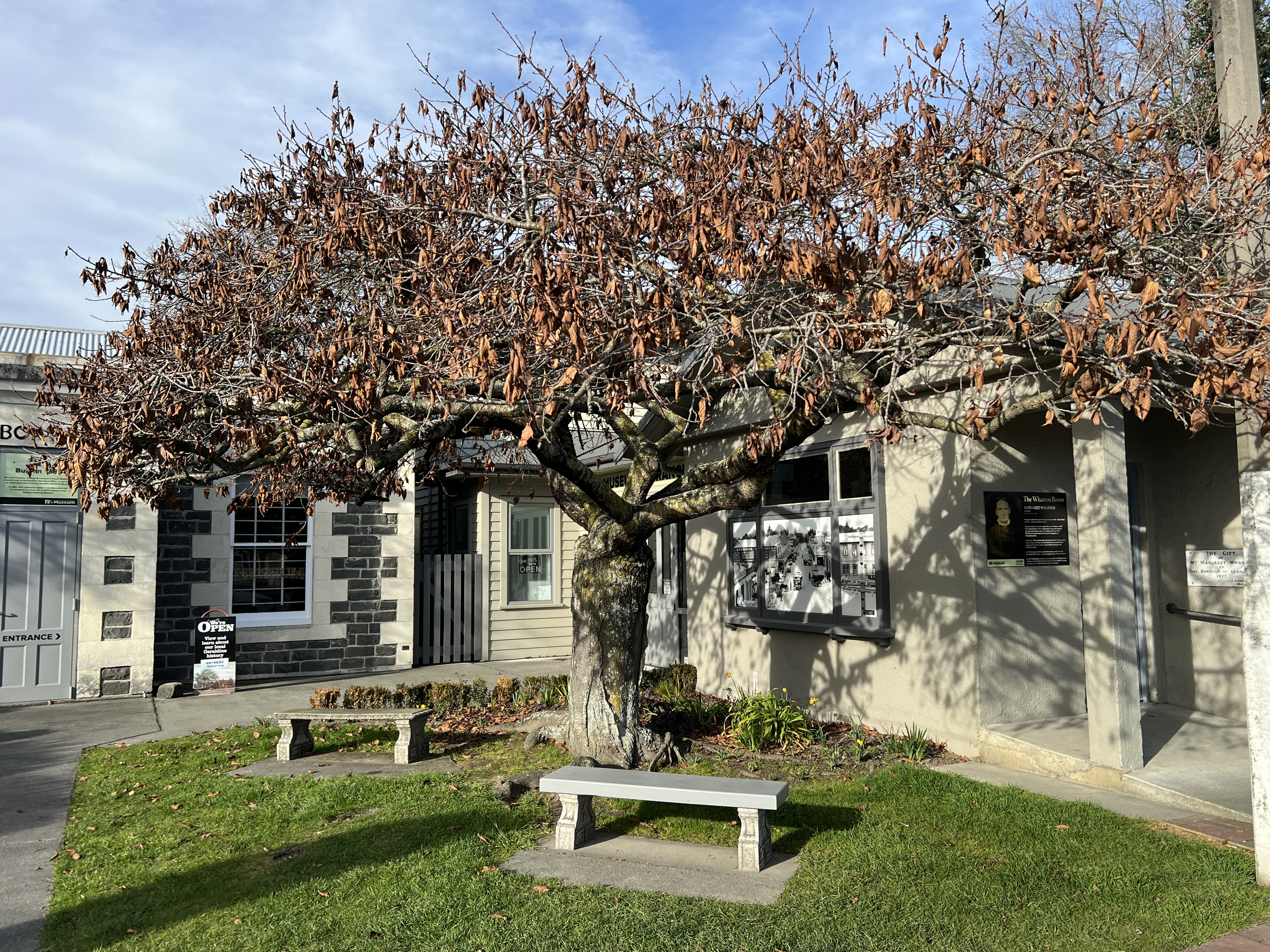
Geraldine Museum

The Geraldine Historical Museum aims to display the history of the Geraldine area. It is located on Cox Street, and incorporates the former Town Board Office building. As well as covering early European settlement there is a display on the long-tailed bats of Kakahu Forest.

=== Geraldine Vintage Car & Machinery Museum ===
The Geraldine Vintage Car & Machinery Museum, located at 178 Talbot Street on the southern edge of town, has a vehicle collection spread over seven buildings including 100 tractors dating back to the early 1900s, a 1929 Spartan biplane, the vintage motion picture projectors once used in the Geraldine Cinema, the ship’s engine from the Rangatira, and more than 50 vintage cars. It was founded in the early 1970s by collector Jack Morrison to display his own cars, and later that decade gifted to the Geraldine Vintage Car and Machinery Club, started by the Geraldine Young Farmers in 1967. In 2021 the museum opened a new display of 24 pedal cars and a collection of miniature trains, tractors and airplanes.

=== Route 79 Museum ===
The Route 79 Museum is located just outside of Geraldine at 10 Craig Road. Owned by retired helicopter engineer Paul Robins, it houses his vehicle collection including vintage motorbikes, horse buggies, a 1963 International Australian Army truck, a Bofors anti-aircraft gun, and a 5.5 inch artillery gun he bought from the New Zealand Army.

=== Geraldine Military Museum ===
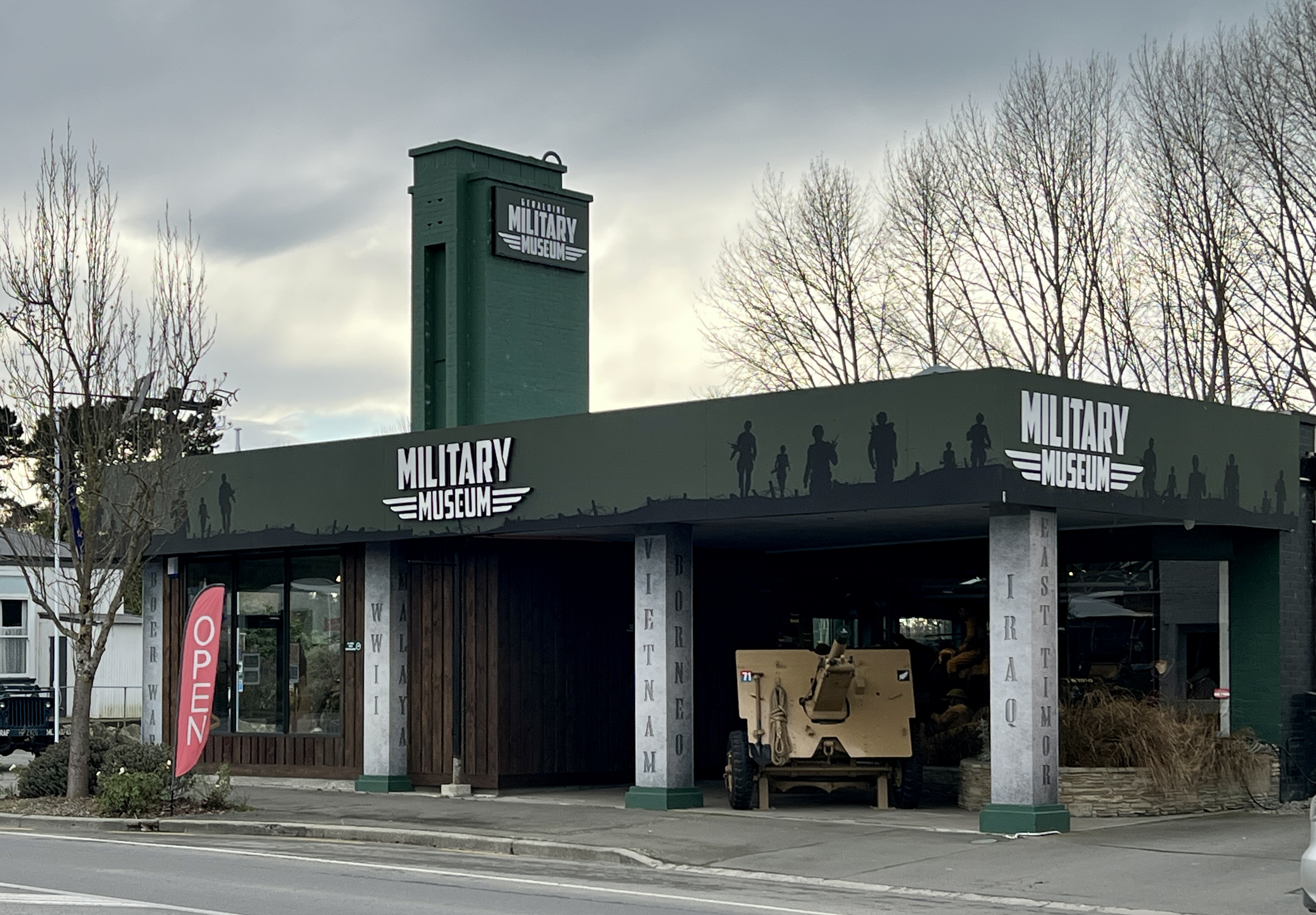
Geraldine Military Museum

Located in the former Morrison's motor garage on Talbot Street, next to the RSA, this military museum opened in November 2023. Its founder Don Pelvin came from a military family, was one of the last New Zealanders called up for compulsory military service, and spent 14 years in the Territorial Force. After collecting military vehicles for decades, he teamed up with other collectors to create displays on World War II and the Vietnam War. Vehicles exhibited include a World War I Lacre truck restored from just chassis and motor, a replica trench, and an FV101 Scorpion tank. The museum attracted criticism in 2025 for its display of a 1st SS Panzer Division Leibstandarte SS Adolf Hitler military camp, and Pelvin offer to work with the New Zealand Holocaust Centre to correctly contextualise the exhibit.

=== Roger Mahan Heritage Centre ===
This 5600 m² museum on Main North Road houses the machinery collection of Geraldine resident Roger Mahan, who died in 2025 at the age of 86. Mahan, who grew up in nearby Peel Forest, had a long career as a heavy machine operator, working on the Benmore Dam project, building roads, and developing quarries. The collection on display encompasses earthmoving machinery, vintage cars, trucks, and New Zealand's oldest tractor, all collected over 74 years. The museum is run by the New Zealand Cultural Heritage Trust, founded by Mahan in 2003, and is supported by volunteers.

=== National Carriage Museum ===
Opening in February 2026, this museum adjoins the Roger Mahan Heritage Centre and has a selection of horse-drawn carriages on display, including Richard Seddon's private coach, an 1889 Snutsel coach built in Brussels, and the last Hansom cab used in Christchurch. Founder Peter Lyttle's collection began in the 1960s, and the museum was built to house it in a temperature- and humidity-controlled environment. The 720 m² building cost over $1.2 million, and includes a 20 foot freezing container to process new acquisitions.

== Churches ==
=== Saint Andrew's ===
Saint Andrew's Presbyterian Church is located on 10 Cox Street in Geraldine. The church is built of local stone and was opened in 1950.

=== Saint Mary's ===
Saint Mary's Anglican Church is at 77 Talbot Street. Although the parish is centred in Geraldine, there are four other churches within the parish: St Thomas' in Woodbury, St Anne's in Pleasant Valley, St Stephen's in Peel Forest, and Holy Innocents at Mt Peel. The Rev Laurence Lawson Brown was appointed the first vicar of Geraldine district in 1862, with a vicarage in Woodbury. The first Anglican church in Geraldine, a wooden building, was constructed in 1863 for £1020, seating 100. This was quickly outgrown, and a new stone church designed by Maurice de Havern Duval was built for £1120 by P. Clayton, with the foundation stone laid 23 Nov 1882 by Bishop Harper, and consecrated in August 1883. The original wooden St Mary's was then used as a hall and Sunday School room before being relocated to Orari in 1906, where in 1925 it burnt down. The current St Mary's church is built in Gothic style with fifteen large leadlight windows, and is listed as a category two historic place with Heritage New Zealand.

=== Immaculate Conception ===
The Catholic Church known as St Mary Mackillop Parish – Immaculate Conception Church is located at 19 Hislop Street. It was opened in 1935 and cost £10,000 to build. The church can seat up to 300. The building is constructed of reinforced concrete and brick, and the altar of Oamaru stone.

Geraldine churches

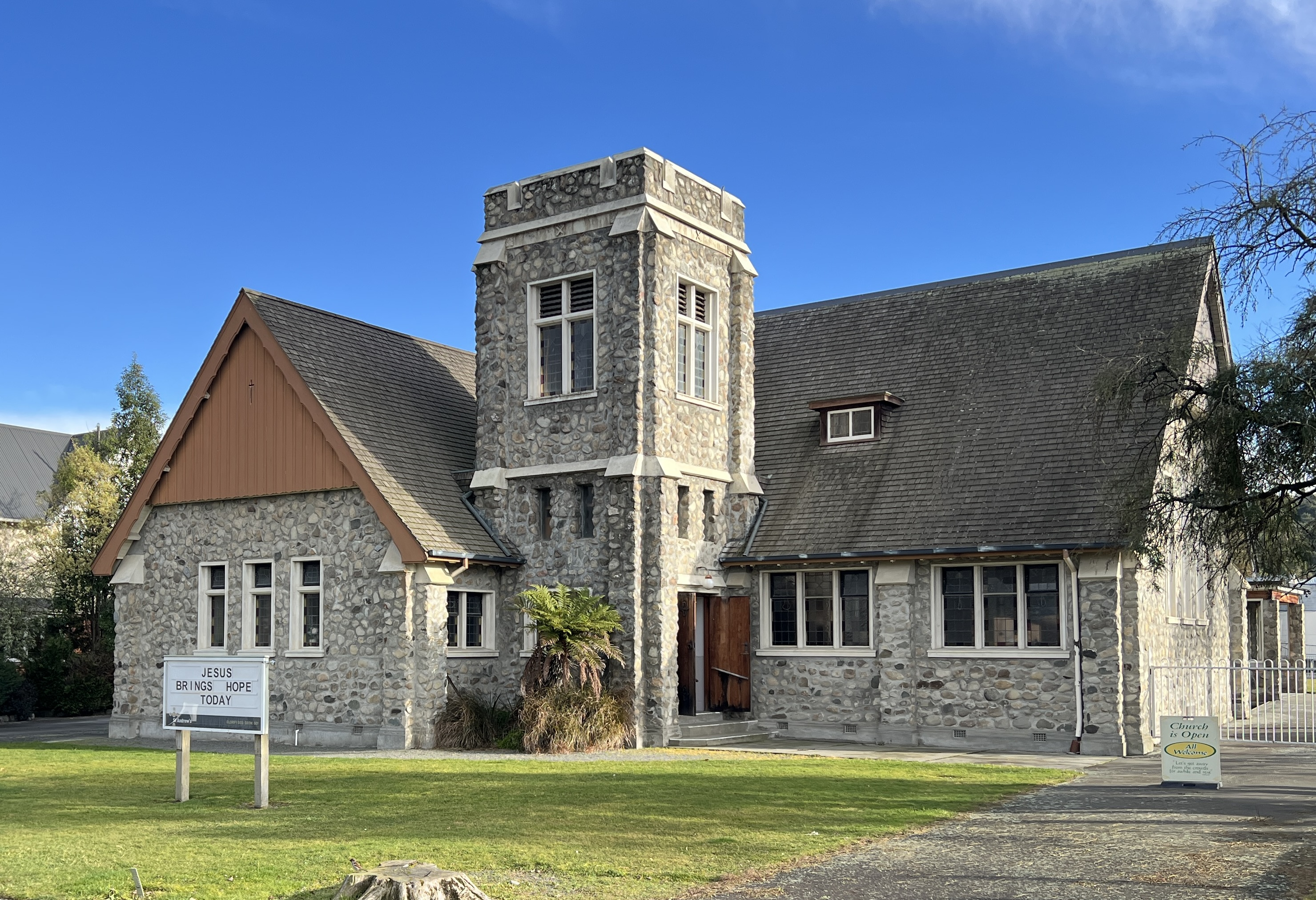
St Andrew's Presbyterian Church

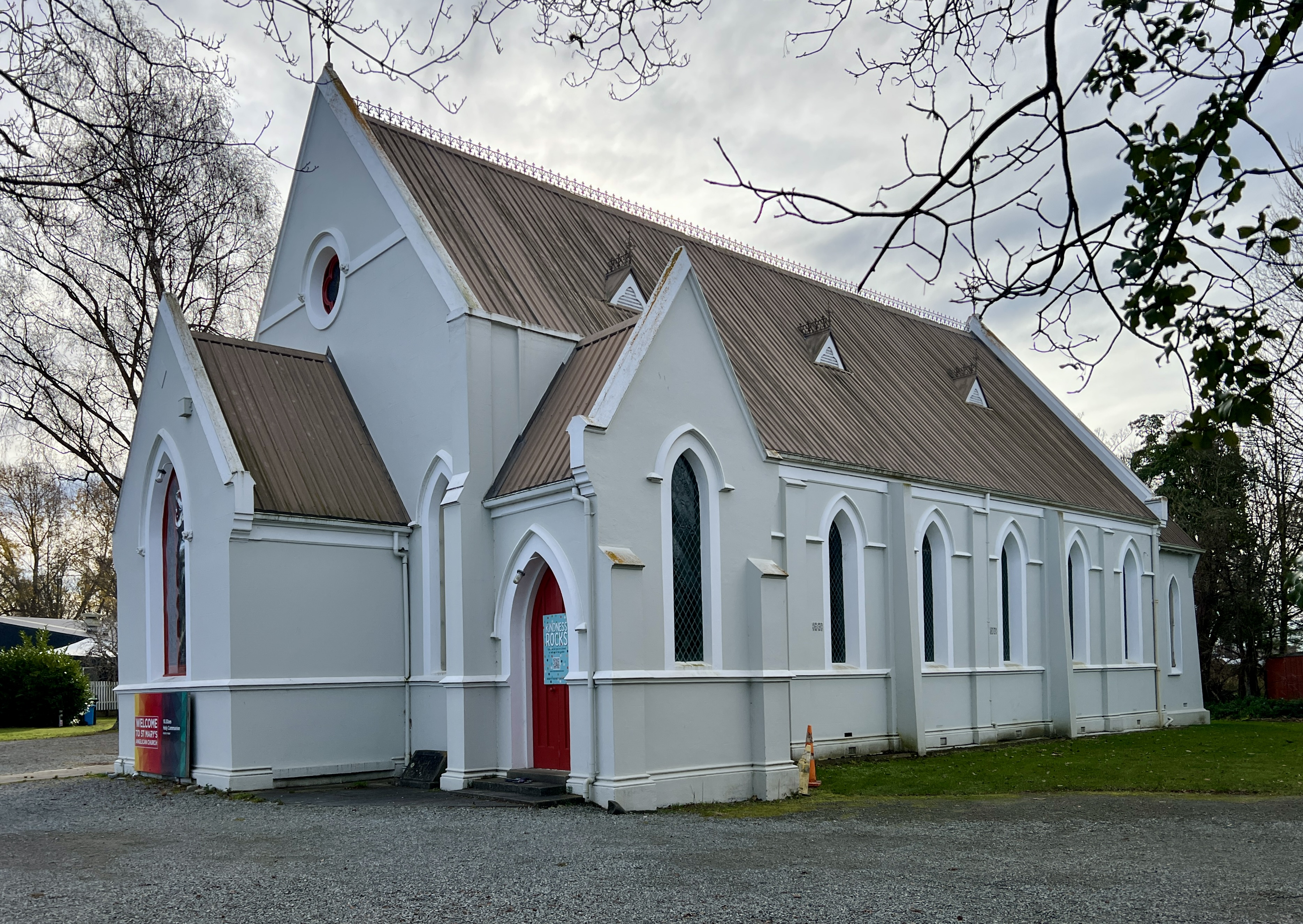
St Mary's Anglican Church

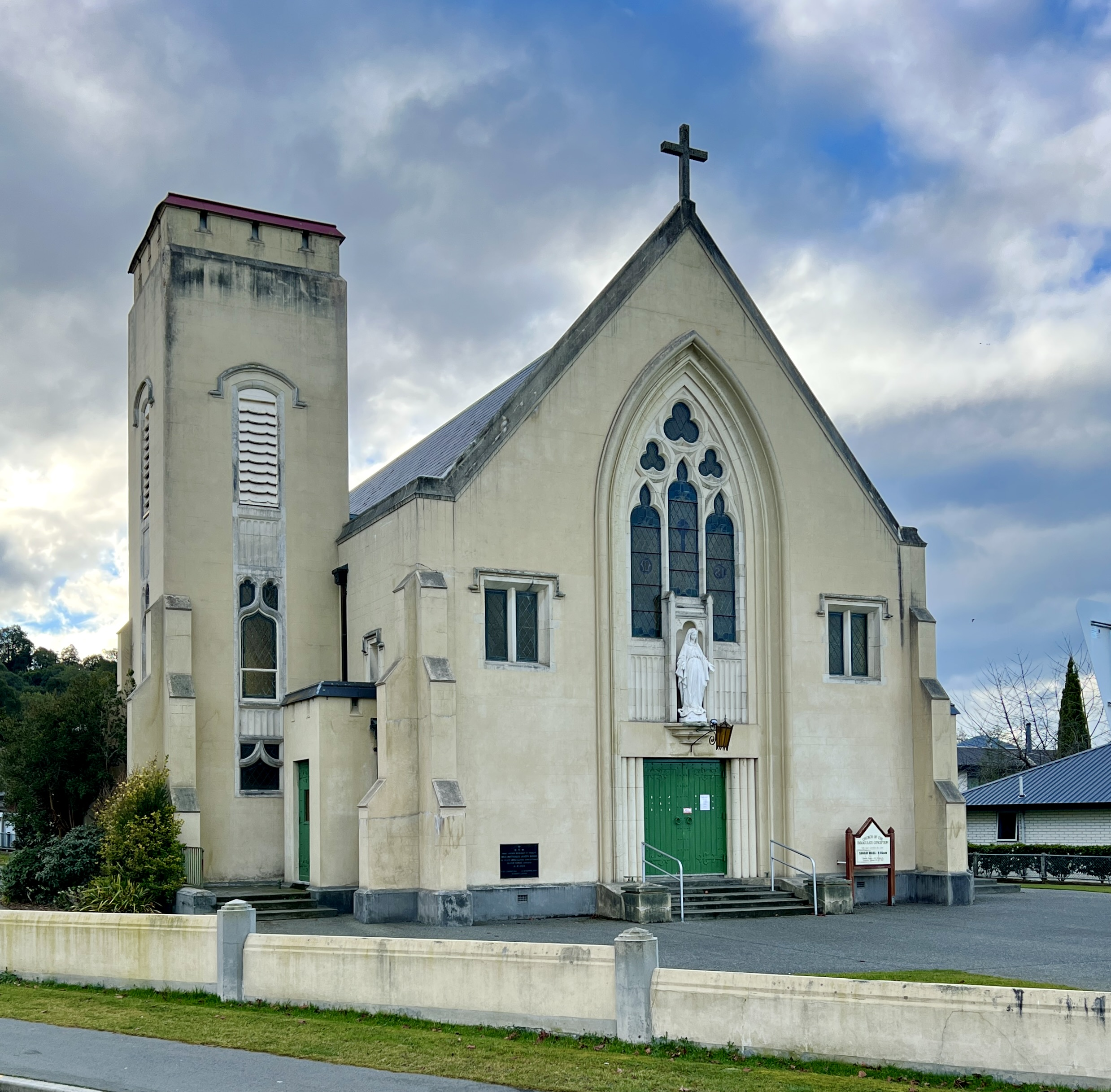
Immaculate Conception

== Notable buildings ==
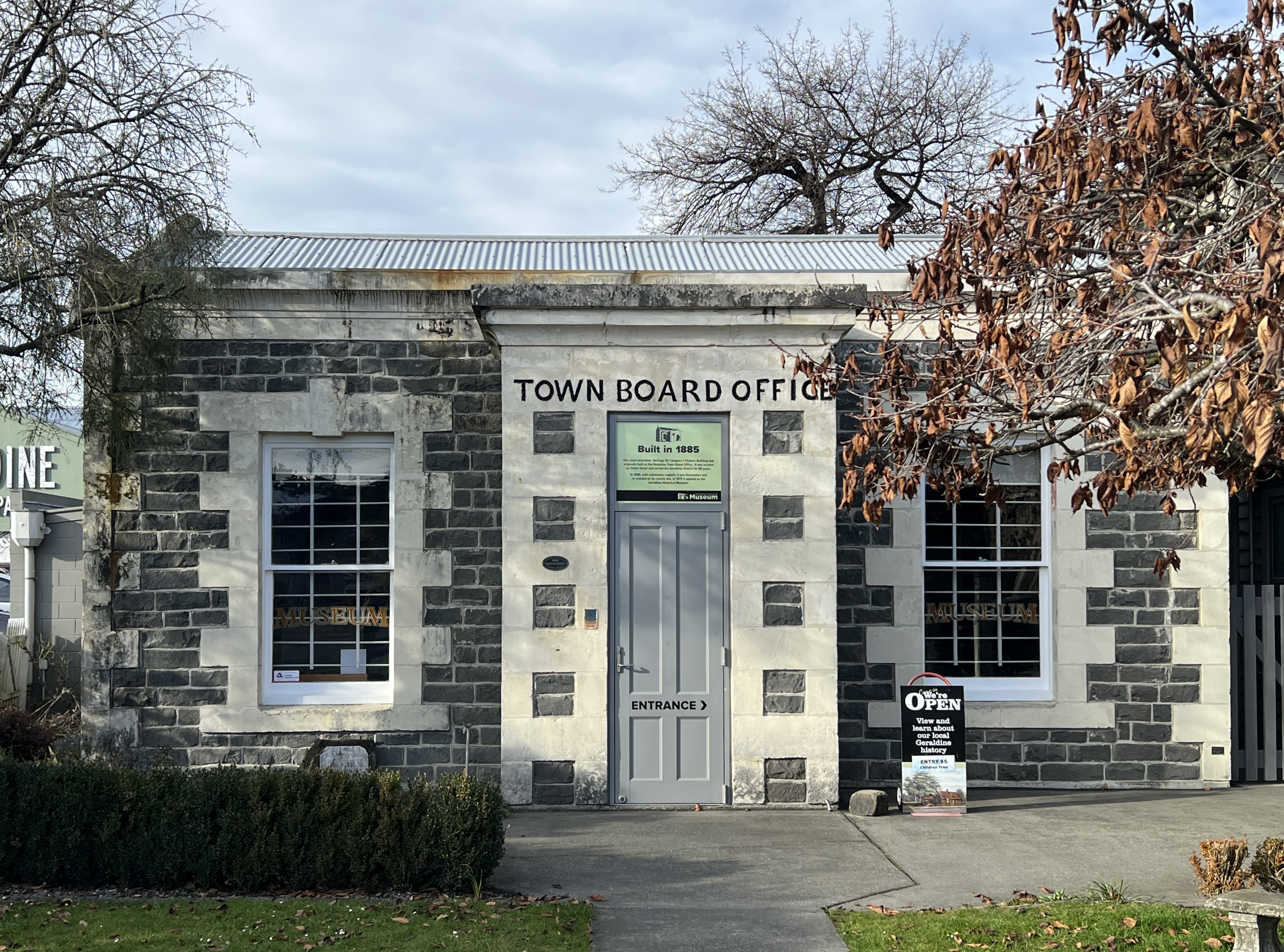
Former Town Board Office

=== Town Board Office ===
The Town Board Office on Cox Street is now part of the Geraldine Historical Museum. It was originally built on Talbot Street in 1885 and cost £269 to build. It was designed by the architect D. McKenzie and built of bluestone by Dierck and White. When Geraldine became a borough in 1905 the building was used by the Borough Council. It served the town until 1969, and in 1975 was dismantled and re-erected on Cox Street by the Geraldine Historical Society to be used as part of the museum.

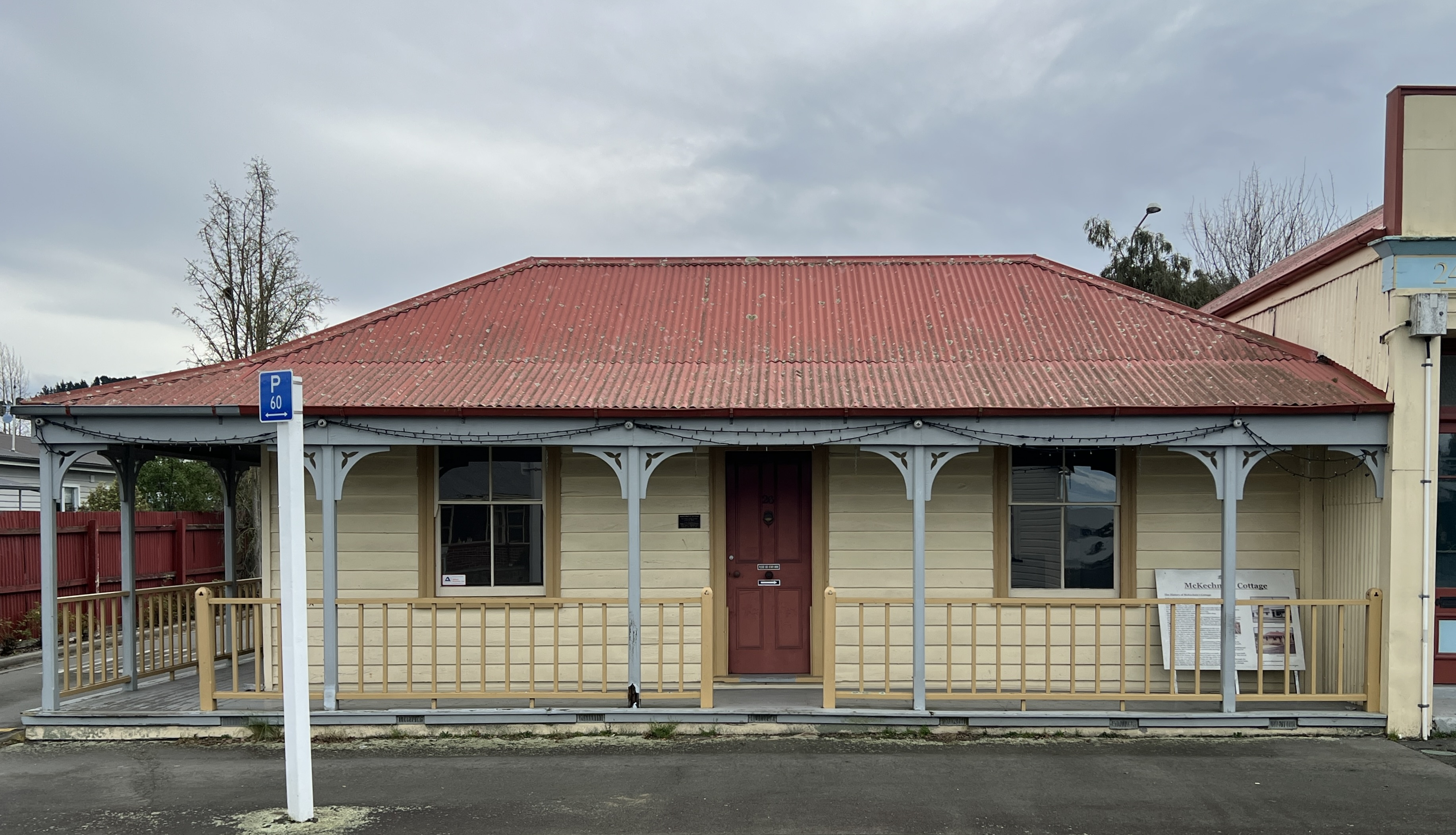
McKechnie's cottage

=== McKechnie's cottage ===
This modest cottage with a small outhouse in the backyard on Wilson Street was built in 1873 by Hugh Morrison. It is one of the oldest buildings in Geraldine and it was built using plaster and lath. Between 1896 and 1902, it was used as a tailor's shop. In 1941 Douglas McKechnie bought it and lived in it for 47 years; he was the mayor of Geraldine between 1939 and 1949.

Crown Hotel

=== Crown Hotel ===
The Crown Hotel or Crown Heritage Hotel is located at 31 Talbot Street. The original building was destroyed by a fire, and the current building was constructed in 1906. It is listed as a category two historic place with Heritage New Zealand.

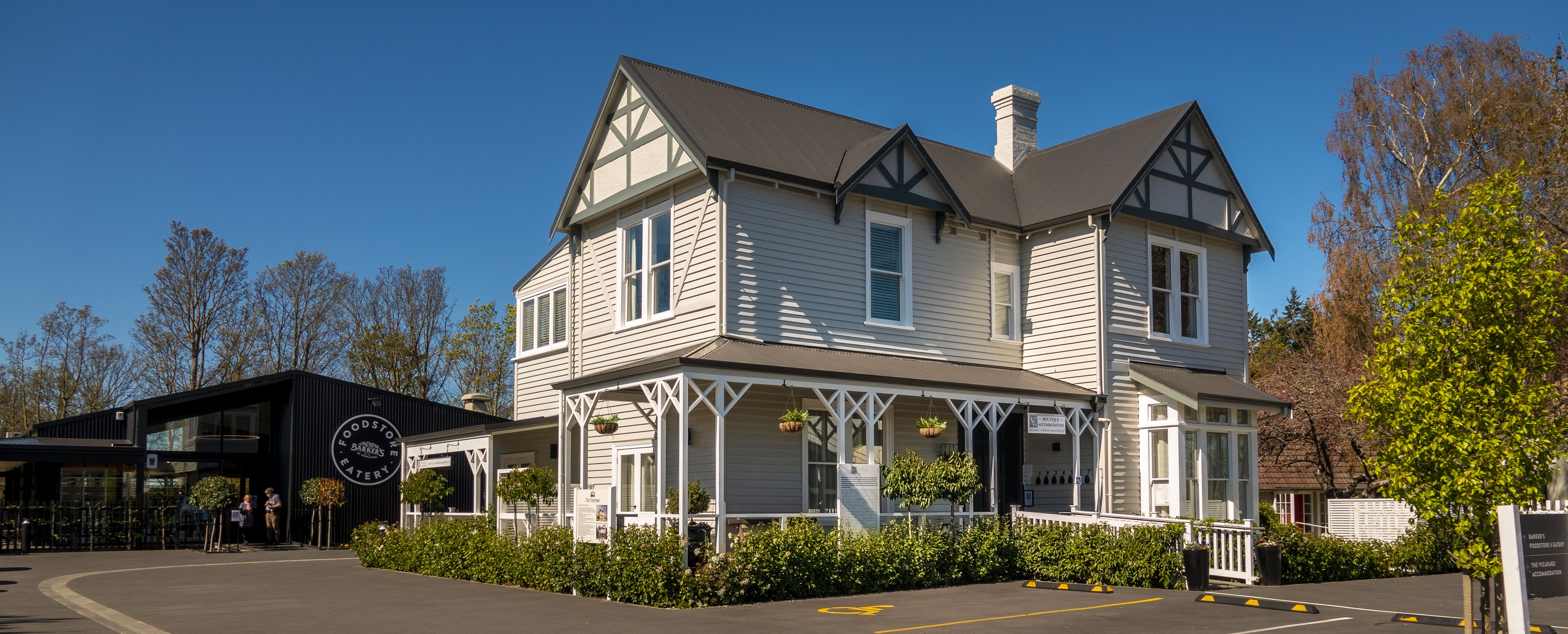
The Vicarage Geraldine

=== The Vicarage Geraldine ===
The former vicarage of St Mary's is located next to the church on Talbot Street, and is listed as a Category II historic place. This Arts and Crafts house was built in 1900, and housed 15 vicars and their families before being sold by the parish in 2017. It was restored as boutique accommodation in 2018–2019. The restoration was a finalist in the 'domestic saved and restored' category of the Canterbury Heritage Awards.

Former Post Office

=== Post Office ===
The Post Office was opened in November 1908 by the then-prime minister Sir Joseph Ward. The two storey building located on the intersection of Talbot Street and Cox Street provided a mail room, public office, postmaster's room, telephone room, and private boxes on the ground floor, and living quarters for the postmaster on the first floor. In 1997 the post office moved to different premises, and the building was sold in 2005 at auction for $349,500. It has been used by a variety of retail businesses since then. It is listed as a category two historic place with Heritage New Zealand.

=== Heritage listed buildings ===
The town has other category-two heritage listed buildings, which include:

- A brick cottage at 137 Talbot Street
- A cottage at 192 Talbot Street, built around 1873, with an adjoining corner shop built on the same section in 1901. The shop was originally a bakery, and was sold in 1906 to Thomas Elliott who ran it as a drapery until his death in 1919. It was closed for many years but was preserved by Elliott's widow and then daughter before being sold and refurbished in 1993 to operate as a barbershop.
- The Geraldine Co-operative Cheese Factory on Pleasant Valley Road, built in 1884 and the oldest exant example of a dairy factory in New Zealand. Built before general guidelines for dairy factories were drawn up in the 1890s, it is constructed of local basalt and limestone. Initially trading as the Geraldine Cheese, Butter and Bacon Factory, it reopened as a creamery in 1906, and made cheese until it closed in 1959. It is now a private home.
Heritage buildings

137 Talbot Street

Corner shop cottage, 192 Talbot Street

Corner shop, 192 Talbot Street

Co-operative Cheese Factory

== Notable people ==
- John Badcock, artist
- Thomas Buxton, politician
- Frederick Flatman, politician
- Mark Inglis, mountaineer
- Jordan Luck, musician
- Hayden Paddon, rally driver
- William Postlethwaite, politician
- Annabel Ritchie, rower
- William Rolleston, politician
- Gus Spillane, former All Black
- Edward Wakefield, politician
- Peter Williams, broadcaster

== Climate ==
Climate data for Geraldine (Orari Estate) (1991–2020 normals, extremes 1972–present)
Month	Jan	Feb	Mar	Apr	May	Jun	Jul	Aug	Sep	Oct	Nov	Dec	Year
Record high °C (°F)	38.3 (100.9)	38.5 (101.3)	34.5 (94.1)	31.7 (89.1)	27.3 (81.1)	23.0 (73.4)	22.0 (71.6)	24.0 (75.2)	28.4 (83.1)	31.0 (87.8)	33.3 (91.9)	35.4 (95.7)	38.5 (101.3)
Mean maximum °C (°F)	31.9 (89.4)	31.0 (87.8)	29.2 (84.6)	24.9 (76.8)	21.7 (71.1)	17.8 (64.0)	18.1 (64.6)	20.2 (68.4)	23.2 (73.8)	25.7 (78.3)	27.7 (81.9)	29.9 (85.8)	33.4 (92.1)
Mean daily maximum °C (°F)	22.1 (71.8)	21.7 (71.1)	20.0 (68.0)	16.9 (62.4)	14.0 (57.2)	11.2 (52.2)	10.8 (51.4)	12.5 (54.5)	15.0 (59.0)	16.8 (62.2)	18.5 (65.3)	20.5 (68.9)	16.7 (62.0)
Daily mean °C (°F)	16.3 (61.3)	16.0 (60.8)	14.2 (57.6)	11.2 (52.2)	8.5 (47.3)	5.7 (42.3)	5.2 (41.4)	6.8 (44.2)	9.0 (48.2)	10.9 (51.6)	12.7 (54.9)	14.9 (58.8)	11.0 (51.7)
Mean daily minimum °C (°F)	10.5 (50.9)	10.3 (50.5)	8.4 (47.1)	5.6 (42.1)	3.0 (37.4)	0.3 (32.5)	−0.4 (31.3)	1.2 (34.2)	3.1 (37.6)	5.0 (41.0)	6.8 (44.2)	9.2 (48.6)	5.3 (41.5)
Mean minimum °C (°F)	4.4 (39.9)	4.2 (39.6)	2.1 (35.8)	0.1 (32.2)	−2.1 (28.2)	−4.5 (23.9)	−4.9 (23.2)	−4.1 (24.6)	−2.3 (27.9)	−0.6 (30.9)	1.0 (33.8)	3.6 (38.5)	−5.8 (21.6)
Record low °C (°F)	2.0 (35.6)	1.3 (34.3)	−1.6 (29.1)	−3.2 (26.2)	−7.4 (18.7)	−7.9 (17.8)	−7.4 (18.7)	−7.2 (19.0)	−4.0 (24.8)	−3.1 (26.4)	−1.3 (29.7)	0.4 (32.7)	−7.9 (17.8)
Average rainfall mm (inches)	56.1 (2.21)	61.3 (2.41)	55.0 (2.17)	64.5 (2.54)	50.3 (1.98)	53.8 (2.12)	54.3 (2.14)	58.1 (2.29)	43.9 (1.73)	56.6 (2.23)	63.1 (2.48)	60.1 (2.37)	677.1 (26.67)
Source: NIWA

Climate data for Geraldine (1981–2010)
Month	Jan	Feb	Mar	Apr	May	Jun	Jul	Aug	Sep	Oct	Nov	Dec	Year
Mean daily maximum °C (°F)	23.0 (73.4)	22.1 (71.8)	20.1 (68.2)	17.8 (64.0)	14.3 (57.7)	11.6 (52.9)	10.9 (51.6)	12.5 (54.5)	15.1 (59.2)	17.0 (62.6)	18.9 (66.0)	20.7 (69.3)	17.0 (62.6)
Daily mean °C (°F)	16.9 (62.4)	16.4 (61.5)	14.4 (57.9)	11.6 (52.9)	8.6 (47.5)	5.9 (42.6)	5.2 (41.4)	6.8 (44.2)	9.3 (48.7)	11.2 (52.2)	13.2 (55.8)	15.2 (59.4)	11.2 (52.2)
Mean daily minimum °C (°F)	10.8 (51.4)	10.6 (51.1)	8.6 (47.5)	5.5 (41.9)	2.8 (37.0)	0.2 (32.4)	−0.5 (31.1)	1.2 (34.2)	3.5 (38.3)	5.5 (41.9)	7.6 (45.7)	9.8 (49.6)	5.5 (41.8)
Average rainfall mm (inches)	77.7 (3.06)	77.2 (3.04)	89.0 (3.50)	71.1 (2.80)	56.4 (2.22)	46.6 (1.83)	61.0 (2.40)	64.3 (2.53)	50.7 (2.00)	65.1 (2.56)	60.0 (2.36)	77.1 (3.04)	796.2 (31.34)
Source: NIWA (rain 1971–2000)
