= John Badcock (artist) =

New Zealand artist

John Badcock (born 1952, Queenstown) is a New Zealand artist based in Geraldine, South Canterbury.

== Early life ==
Badcock was born in 1952 in Queenstown to Douglas Badcock and Agnes ('Bonnie") née Homes. His father Douglas Badcock (1922–2009) was a professional landscape painter. Badcock attended Queenstown Primary School and Waitaki Boys High School before training as a wood carver and cabinet maker. He moved to Geraldine in 1978 and in 1986 opened a gallery and began to paint full-time.

== Artistic career ==
Badcock is a professional artist who has held solo exhibitions throughout New Zealand since 1985. In the 1990s, Badcock frequently exhibited paintings with the McGregor Wright Gallery.

In 2003, he exhibited The Last Supper at ChristChurch Cathedral before the work later toured New Zealand. This work was painted during 2001-2002 after Badcock viewed religious frescoes during a visit to Europe. The 13-metre long work consists of 13 panels, each two metres high, depicting Christ's Last Supper. The figures are depicted in a modern setting, and each one is a self-portrait of Badcock.

Passing People is a series of 100 life-size portraits in oil and charcoal, painted during 2004. Badcock said that the subjects of the portraits were family, friends and "anyone who approached me or who I bumped into or called at the house or studio". Each person sat for two, one-hour sessions while Badcock drew them. Some of the portraits were created at a temporary studio set up in Timaru so that Badcock could find new subjects. It took Badcock 10 months to create the portraits, averaging one every three days. The work was exhibited around New Zealand, including an exhibition at the New Zealand Portrait Gallery in Wellington which was opened by the Deputy Prime Minister in December 2006. Badcock self-published 1000 copies of a book to complement the works, with each of the sitters contributing something about themselves to accompany the portraits.

Badcock was a finalist in the biennial Adam Portraiture Award in 2000 (when it was known as the National Portrait Competition) and in 2002, 2004, 2006, 2010 and 2012.

He is the subject of two New Zealand Art Films: John Badcock – a Film by Brian High, and A Changing Landscape – A Film by Simon Pattison.
