= Barker's of Geraldine =

New Zealand food company

- Industry: Food processing
- Founded: 1969; 57 years ago
- Founder: Anthony and Gillian Barker
- Headquarters: Geraldine, New Zealand
- Products: preserved foods
- Number of employees: 300 (2024)
- Parent: Andros
- Website: https://barkers.co.nz

Barker's of Geraldine is a food processing company based in Geraldine, New Zealand. The business primarily produces fruit preserves, fruit syrups, and relishes.

== History ==
William Edward Barker (1858–1935), one of the sons of the Christchurch doctor and photographer Alfred Barker, was a pioneer in orcharding in South Canterbury. He established an orchard at Peel Forest. Barker Sr. owned land at Ohapi near Geraldine.

Barker's of Geraldine was founded in 1969 by Anthony Barker and his wife Gillian. Anthony Barker is the great-nephew of William Edward Barker, and the orchard is the farm started by Alfred Barker. The business began producing elderflower wine in a converted shed on their farm in Pleasant Valley, but soon shifted to producing fruit preserves. By 2009, the business had grown to purchase around 1,000 tonnes (980 long tons; 1,100 short tons) of New Zealand fruit annually. In 2007, they acquired rival relish manufacturer Anathoth Farm. The business remained family-owned until 2016, when a majority stake was sold to French food company Andros.

Barker's has won several industry awards. In 2009, the company was named the "supreme business" by the South Canterbury Chamber of Commerce in their Business Excellence Awards. In 2015, Barker's was named "South Canterbury's best business". In August 2024, they were again named supreme winners by the Chamber of Commerce.

In 2019, Barker's opened a store and café complex in Geraldine. As of 2024, Barker's employs 300 people, making it the largest employer in Geraldine, a small town with a population of around 3000. In April 2024, the company announced a major expansion of their factory facility in the town that will increase the floorspace from 3,300 m^{2} (36,000 sq ft) to 9,200 m^{2} (99,000 sq ft).

== Environmental issues ==
In 2017 and 2018 Barker's was found to be non-compliant with their wastewater resource consent, as they were discharging more than the permitted daily limit of 200 cubic metres (7,100 cu ft) of water to the storage pond by their factory. They applied to Environment Canterbury (ECan) for a waiver and consent variation, which was granted in 2019. Barker's utilises a 12,000 cubic metres (420,000 cu ft) wastewater storage pond, with the stored water then discharged across a patch of terraced land above the Hae Hae Te Moana River near their factory. According to their consent, the wastewater contains "fruit and vegetable pulp, juice spillage, and wash-down water from cleaning."

In July 2025 it was revealed that Barker's was again under investigation by Environment Canterbury for improperly discharging wastewater after a complaint was made by a local resident. In December it was revealed that the company had been discharging water by irrigating a nearby field, as well as a neighbouring reserve managed by the Department of Conservation (DOC). The discharged water included corrosive caustic soda, intended to moderate the pH, but which had contaminated the reserve land and killed grass on the neighbouring field. There had been 15 complaints made about their operation between 2019 and 2024. Complainants described the discharge as having a "rotten cheesy chunder" smell. A member of Barker's staff was also fined for ignoring abatement notices from ECan. Barker's had responded to the issues by trucking wastewater off-site for treatment. They claimed that they had done nothing wrong, and alleged that the government agencies had not engaged with them meaningfully to resolve the issues.

In 2025, Barker's acquired a neighbouring pine plantation for NZ$1,600,000, and was granted consent to move their discharge operations to the 7.3 hectares (18 acres) forest. Neighbours complained that the forest now had a "putrid smell", and described it as an "industrial waste zone". Despite claiming the forest plan would solve their waste disposal issues, in February 2026 Barker's again applied to DOC to discharge 12,000 cubic metres (420,000 cu ft) of wastewater onto a new area of conservation land. The application was withdrawn in September that year.
