= McGregor Wright Gallery =

Defunct art gallery in New Zealand

The McGregor Wright Gallery was an art gallery in New Zealand from 1879–2013, one of the longest-running galleries in New Zealand. It was established by McGregor Wright in Dunedin. The gallery was based in Wellington for most of its history, but in the 1970s included a branch in Auckland. It specialised in oil and watercolour landscape paintings.

== History ==
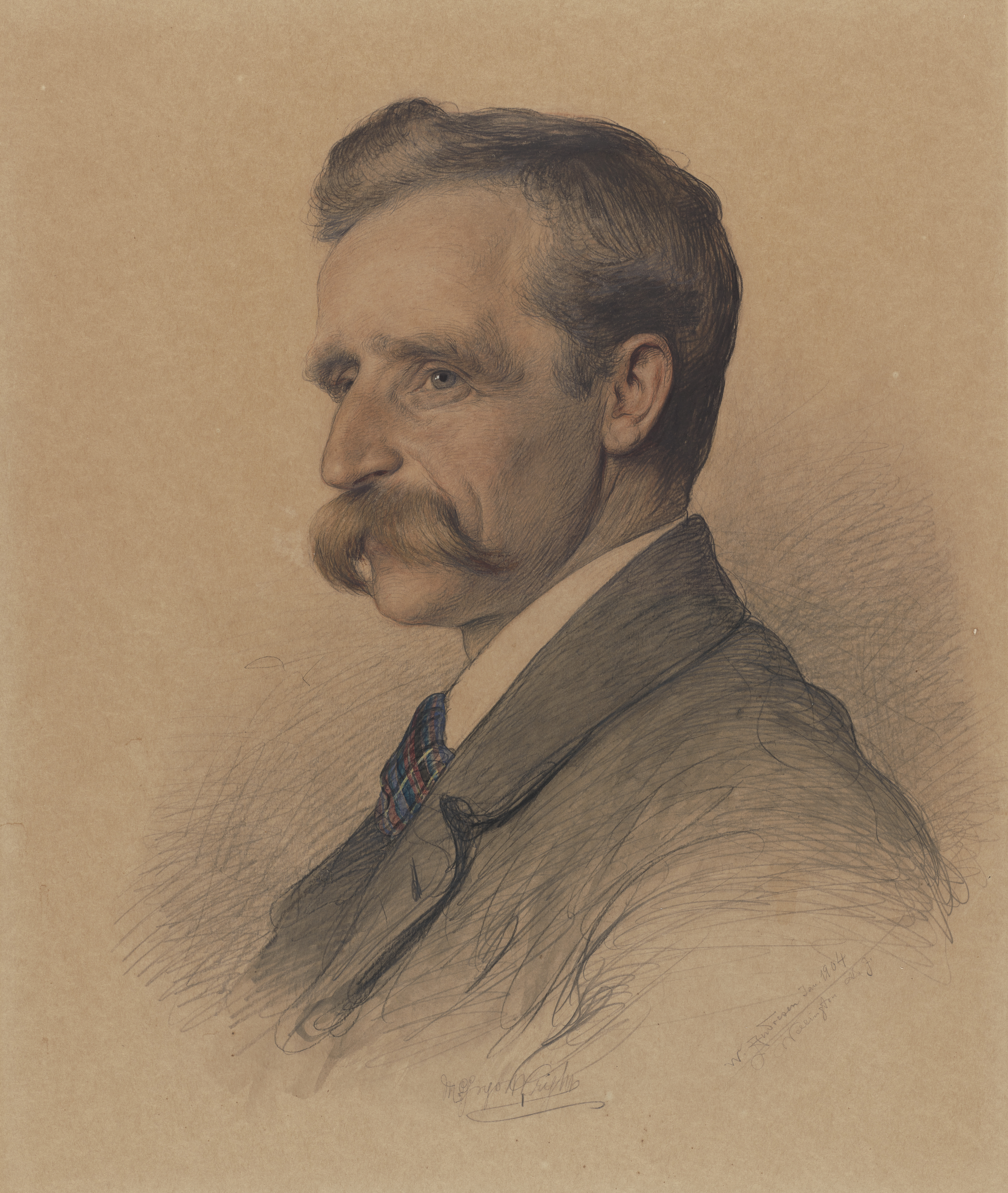
Portrait of McGregor Wright, 1904, New Zealand, by Christian Allers. Purchased 2022. Te Papa (2022-0030-1)

The gallery was established in Moray Place, Dunedin, in 1879, and moved to 1 Princes St in 1885. A Wellington branch opened in 1888 at 129 Lambton Quay, and the Dunedin branch closed in 1902. In 1906 Wright sold the business. It was run by Alexander Paterson until the 1930s, when Paterson's nephew Dick Osborne and his wife Phoebe took over. They sold the gallery to their daughter Nancye and her husband Gordon Cooksley, who ran the gallery until it closed in 2013.

The gallery was based at 115 Lambton Quay for over 50 years before moving to 26 Waring Taylor St in 1987. The Cooksleys opened a Raumati branch in 1986, which was the sole premises after the Waring Taylor shop closed in 2001.

The gallery celebrated its centenary at Turnbull House in July 1979, and continued to celebrate its birthdays with special exhibitions until its 126th birthday in 2005.

It also ran fine art auctions covering a wider range of artists and artworks.

== Artists ==
The McGregor Wright Gallery maintained relationships with many professional New Zealand artists.

In the late 19th and early 20th centuries, artists exhibited at the gallery included Frances Hodgkins, Dorothy Kate Richmond, James Nairn, C. F. Goldie, Petrus Van der Velden, C N Worsley, and Gwyneth Richardson.

In the mid-20th century, artists included Nugent Welch and Rita Angus.

Post-1960, artists included Douglas and John Badcock, David Barker, Gaston de Vel, Tom and Clark Esplin, Don Neilson, Peter Brown, and NZ war artists Peter McIntyre and Ion Brown.
