= Cust, New Zealand =

Town in Canterbury, New Zealand

Cust
- Village
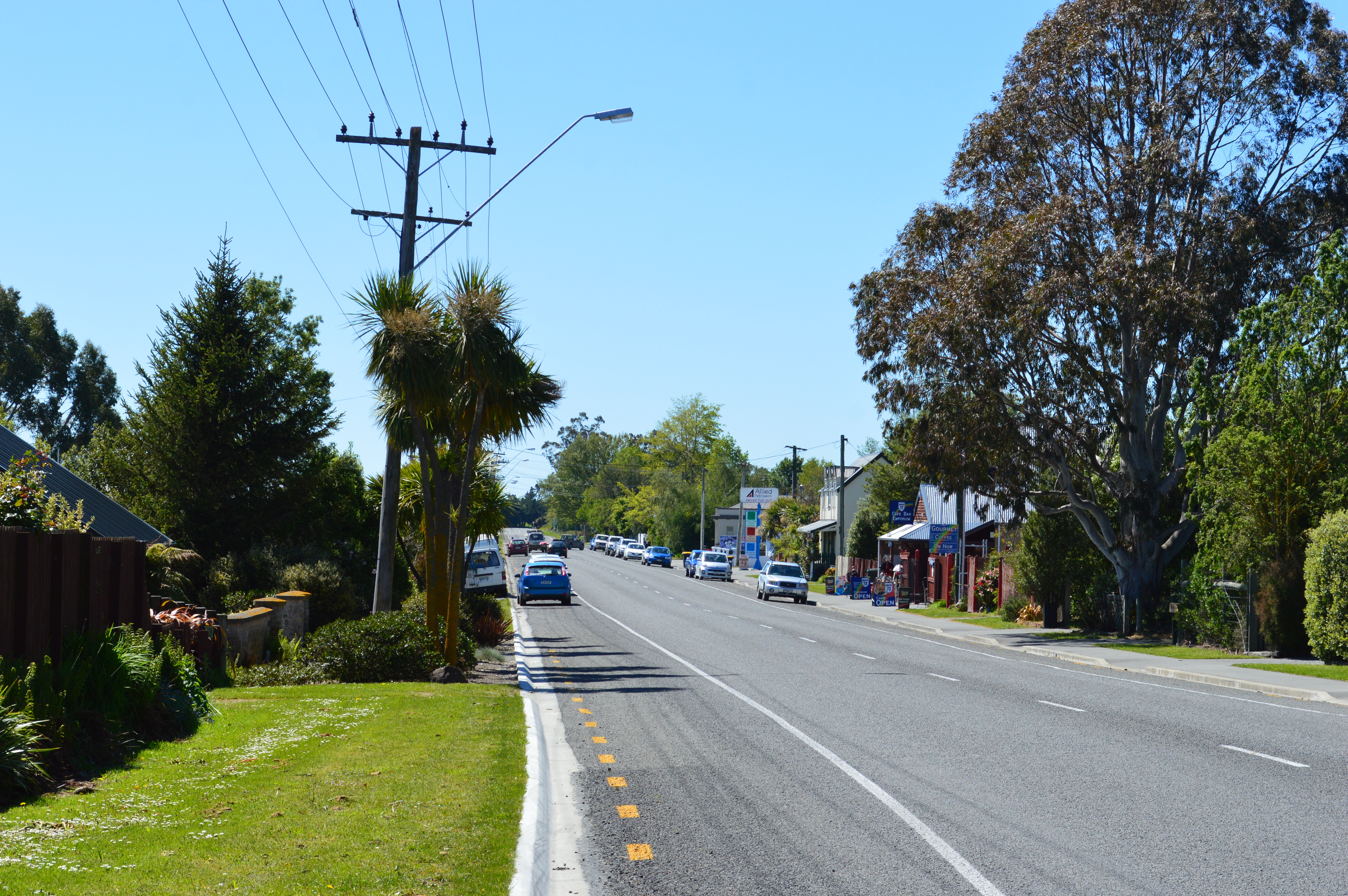
- The main street of Cust - Cust Rd
- Interactive map of Cust
- Coordinates: 43°18′40″S 172°22′55″E
- Country: New Zealand
- Region: Canterbury
- Territorial authority: Waimakariri District
- Ward: Rangiora-Ashley Ward
- Community: Rangiora-Ashley Community
- Electorates: Waimakariri; Te Tai Tonga (Māori)

Government
  - Territorial Authority: Waimakariri District Council
  - Regional council: Environment Canterbury
  - Mayor of Waimakariri: Dan Gordon
  - Waimakariri MP: Matt Doocey
  - Te Tai Tonga MP: Tākuta Ferris

Area
  - Total: 0.75 km^{2} (0.29 sq mi)

Population (June 2025)
  - Total: 250
  - Density: 330/km^{2} (860/sq mi)
- Time zone: UTC+12 (NZST)
  - Summer (DST): UTC+13 (NZDT)
- Postcode: 7471 and 7475
- Area code: 03
- Local iwi: Ngāi Tahu (Kāi Tahu)

Cust is a rural village in the South Island of New Zealand. It is located in North Canterbury and comes under seat of the Waimakariri District Council. It is located approximately 16 km east of Oxford and 17 km west of Rangiora. The town is named after General Sir Edward Cust, who was a member of the Canterbury Association which organised European settlement of the area around 1850. Earlier names for the town were Moeraki Downs and Middleton-on-the-Cust.

== Education ==
Cust School is Cust's only school. It is a state co-educational full primary school with a decile rating of 10 and a roll of 136 students (as of July 2026). The principal is Miriam Bell. The school opened in 1867 as Cust Valley School, and moved to its present site in 1876.

=== Livestock fundraising drive ===
In June 2026, the Parent Teacher Association (PTA) at Cust School launched "Moos for a Mission & Baa for Brains," a community fundraising drive asking local farmers in Canterbury to donate livestock. The proceeds from processing and selling the donated animals were directed toward funding teacher aides, educational resources, and learning support programmes at the primary school.

== Early Education ==
Early childhood education in the township is provided by the Cust/West Eyreton Playcentre, located on Mill Road. Operating as a parent-led cooperative affiliated with Playcentre Aotearoa, the licensed facility provides early childhood education for children aged 0 to 6 following the Ministry of Education's Te Whāriki curriculum framework.

Summerhill School started as a side school of Cust in 1879 and became independent in 1883. It closed in 1943.

Stoke School opened in 1870. It moved to Springbank in 1823 and closed in 1975.

== Demographics ==
Cust is described by Stats NZ as a rural settlement and covers 0.75 km^{2} (0.29 sq mi). It had an estimated population of 250 as of June 2025, with a population density of 333 people per km^{2}. Cust is part of the larger Starvation Hill-Cust statistical area.

Historical population for Cust
Year	Pop.	±% p.a.
1901	713	—
2001	399	−0.58%
2006	354	−2.36%
2013	288	−2.90%
2018	276	−0.85%
2023	264	−0.89%
The 2006 population is for a larger area of 2.78 km^{2}. Earlier populations may be for different boundaries. Source:

Cust had a population of 264 in the 2023 New Zealand census, a decrease of 12 people (−4.3%) since the 2018 census, and a decrease of 24 people (−8.3%) since the 2013 census. There were 129 males, 132 females, and 3 people of other genders in 114 dwellings. 1.1% of people identified as LGBTIQ+. The median age was 59.6 years (compared with 38.1 years nationally). There were 39 people (14.8%) aged under 15 years, 24 (9.1%) aged 15 to 29, 105 (39.8%) aged 30 to 64, and 99 (37.5%) aged 65 or older.

People could identify as more than one ethnicity. The results were 98.9% European (Pākehā), and 4.5% Māori. English was spoken by 98.9%, Māori by 2.3%, and other languages by 5.7%. No language could be spoken by 1.1% (e.g. too young to talk). The percentage of people born overseas was 18.2, compared with 28.8% nationally.

Religious affiliations were 30.7% Christian, and 2.3% New Age. People who answered that they had no religion were 62.5%, and 4.5% of people did not answer the census question.

Of those at least 15 years old, 48 (21.3%) people had a bachelor's or higher degree, 132 (58.7%) had a post-high school certificate or diploma, and 45 (20.0%) people exclusively held high school qualifications. The median income was $37,600, compared with $41,500 nationally. 15 people (6.7%) earned over $100,000 compared to 12.1% nationally. The employment status of those at least 15 was 93 (41.3%) full-time, 45 (20.0%) part-time, and 3 (1.3%) unemployed.

=== Starvation Hill-Cust statistical area ===
Starvation Hill-Cust statistical area covers 181.65 km^{2} (70.14 sq mi). It had an estimated population of 2,410 as of June 2025, with a population density of 13.3 people per km^{2}.

Historical population for Starvation Hill-Cust
Year	Pop.	±% p.a.
2006	1,389	—
2013	1,950	+4.97%
2018	2,217	+2.60%
2023	2,397	+1.57%

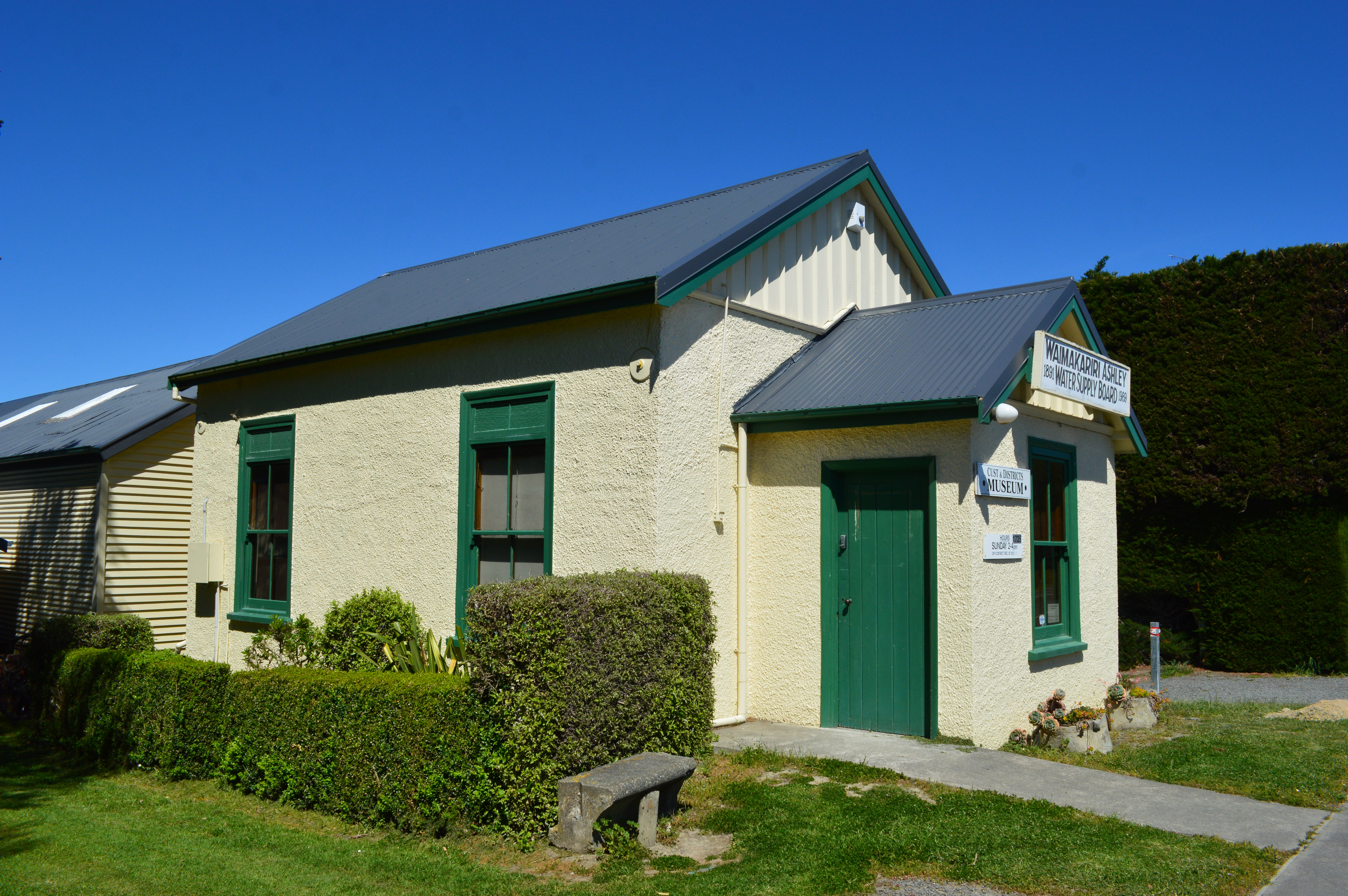
Cust museum

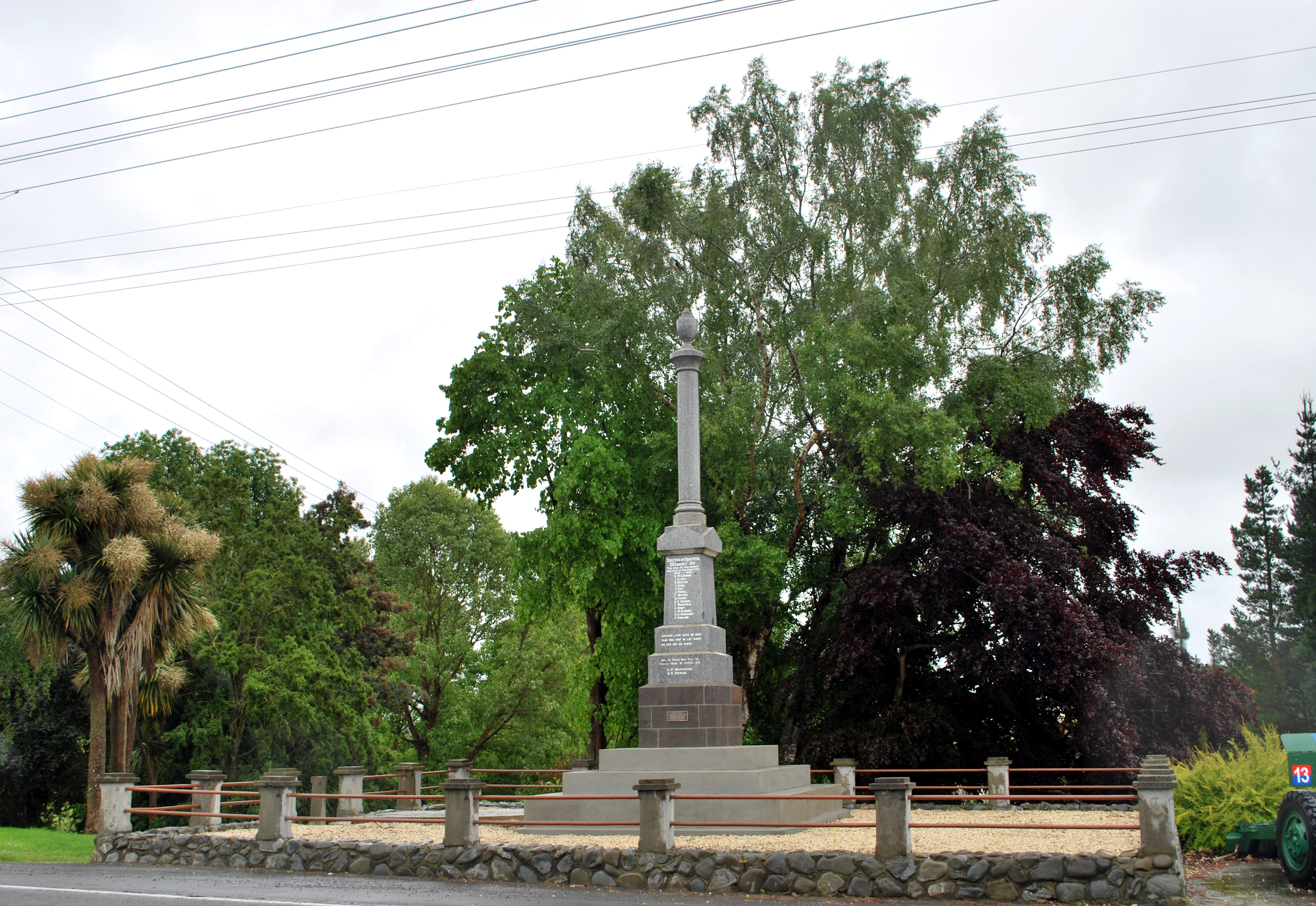
Cust war memorial

Starvation Hill-Cust had a population of 2,397 in the 2023 New Zealand census, an increase of 180 people (8.1%) since the 2018 census, and an increase of 447 people (22.9%) since the 2013 census. There were 1,191 males, 1,194 females, and 9 people of other genders in 870 dwellings. 1.6% of people identified as LGBTIQ+. The median age was 47.6 years (compared with 38.1 years nationally). There were 450 people (18.8%) aged under 15 years, 303 (12.6%) aged 15 to 29, 1,143 (47.7%) aged 30 to 64, and 498 (20.8%) aged 65 or older.

People could identify as more than one ethnicity. The results were 94.9% European (Pākehā); 6.0% Māori; 0.3% Pasifika; 1.8% Asian; 0.4% Middle Eastern, Latin American and African New Zealanders (MELAA); and 4.4% other, which includes people giving their ethnicity as "New Zealander". English was spoken by 98.2%, Māori by 1.1%, Samoan by 0.1%, and other languages by 7.3%. No language could be spoken by 1.5% (e.g. too young to talk). New Zealand Sign Language was known by 0.4%. The percentage of people born overseas was 18.5, compared with 28.8% nationally.

Religious affiliations were 29.3% Christian, 0.1% Māori religious beliefs, 0.4% Buddhist, 0.4% New Age, and 0.8% other religions. People who answered that they had no religion were 60.1%, and 9.0% of people did not answer the census question.

Of those at least 15 years old, 432 (22.2%) people had a bachelor's or higher degree, 1,110 (57.0%) had a post-high school certificate or diploma, and 399 (20.5%) people exclusively held high school qualifications. The median income was $42,100, compared with $41,500 nationally. 285 people (14.6%) earned over $100,000 compared to 12.1% nationally. The employment status of those at least 15 was 945 (48.5%) full-time, 390 (20.0%) part-time, and 21 (1.1%) unemployed.

== Motorcycle racing ==
Between 1936 and 1963, Cust was a significant center for New Zealand motorcycle racing. The first New Zealand Grand Prix (organised road race) was held at Cust on Easter 1936, attracting approximately 6,000 spectators to the gravel-road circuit. The inaugural race featured 24 starters and was won by W. Nelson in 2 hours, 41 minutes, and 12.6 seconds.

The annual Easter event grew significantly over the following decades, with crowds occasionally swelling the village population to 25,000. The races were held on a metalled-road circuit until 1963, when the Grand Prix was relocated to the Ruapuna race track in Christchurch.

== 1698 Cust Road ==
1698 Cust Road is a notable log house located in Cust, New Zealand. Constructed using handcrafted solid log walls for natural thermal insulation, the four-bedroom residence features internal vaulted ceilings made of native rimu timber.

The building is oriented towards the northwest, incorporating high-set A-frame windows designed to capture natural light and viewlines toward Mount Thomas and the adjacent ranges.

The interior layout comprises open-plan living and dining areas that step out onto a large timber deck and paved patio. Secondary structures on the property, including a detached double garage and a woodshed, were built using matching log construction techniques.

The surrounding terraced landscape features established native ferns, mature trees, and a stone water feature with a fish pond. Infrastructure on the site includes a connection to the town water supply and an on-site septic tank waste system.

== Woman and Children Trapped in Flood Waters ==
The area around Cust is prone to localized flooding during severe weather events in Canterbury. During a major storm event on 30 April 2025, rapidly rising floodwaters inundated low-lying areas and river crossings.

During the event, emergency services safely rescued a woman and two children who became trapped in their vehicle on a bridge over the Cust River after rising floodwaters surrounded the car and rendered the road impassable.

== Cust Museum ==
The Cust Museum, located at 1725 Main Road, is a local history museum administered by the Cust and Districts Historical Records Society. It is housed in the former offices of the Waimakariri-Ashley Water Supply Board, a building noted for its connection to the region's early water management and engineering history.

The museum's collection focuses on the social and natural history of the district—an area bounded by Bennetts, Fernside, the Ashley River / Rakahuri, and the Waimakariri River. Key exhibits include:

- Heritage displays: Artifacts and narratives documenting the lives of early colonial and agricultural settlers in North Canterbury.
- Genealogical research: A repository of historical records curated for family history research, serving descendants of the area's original settler families.

== Local folklore ==
The township is known for reports of paranormal activity, particularly at the historic Cust Pub. Local tradition describes a spirit known as "Mary" who is said to inhabit the upper floor. In 2025, restaurateur Philip Kraal reopened the pub; despite initial skepticism, Kraal reported an unexplained late-night incident that contributed to the site's reputation as a local attraction for ghost stories.

== Cust fatal crash ==
On 11 June 2025, at approximately 1:25 p.m. NZST, a single-vehicle rollover crash occurred on Bowicks Road in Cust, Canterbury. Emergency services responded to the scene, where the driver and sole occupant was pronounced dead. The New Zealand Police Serious Crash Unit conducted a scene examination to investigate the cause of the incident.

== Waste management ==
Following submissions by the Cust Community Network in 2017 and 2018, the Waimakariri District Council established a drop-off rural recycling facility in the car park behind the Cust Hotel in 2019. The site was funded via the council's share of the Ministry for the Environment's waste disposal levy.

== Emergency services ==
Fire suppression and emergency response services in the district are provided by the Cust Volunteer Fire Brigade, operating under Fire and Emergency New Zealand (FENZ).

The brigade responds to local structure fires, rural vegetation fires, motor vehicle crashes, and medical emergencies throughout the western Waimakariri District. It routinely provides mutual aid support to and receives assistance from neighbouring volunteer fire brigades, including those in Oxford, Swannanoa, and West Eyreton.

On 19 May 2025, the facility closed following a change in ownership of the hotel, with the council initiating investigations into alternative local sites for a replacement facility.

== Hydrology and drainage ==
Local surface water and drainage around Cust are managed through networks such as the Cust Main Drain. Environment Canterbury maintains a hydrological monitoring station on the Cust Main Drain at Threlkelds Road to track river levels and discharge rates. Hydrometric data for the site records a mean annual flood of 40 cubic metres per second ($$\text{m}^3/\text{s}$$), with a modelled 1-in-10-year flood event estimated at 90 $$\text{m}^3/\text{s}$$.

== Climate ==
The average temperature in summer is 16.2 °C, and in winter is 5.9 °C.

Month	Normal temperature
January	16.8 °C
February	16.3 °C
March	14.6 °C
April	11.6 °C
May	8.3 °C
June	5.8 °C
July	5.3 °C
August	6.5 °C
September	8.9 °C
October	11.2 °C
November	13.3 °C
December	15.5 °C
