= Community boards in New Zealand =

Body of local politicians in New Zealand

Community boards
- Map of current community board areas
- Location: New Zealand
- Number: 111 (as of 2025)

Community boards in New Zealand are local government bodies that may be established for any continuous area within a territorial authority area, intended to represent and advocate for specific communities. As of 2026, there are 111 community boards across New Zealand. They are distinct from the local boards of Auckland Council.

== History ==
Community boards were first established as part of the 1989 local government reforms, with 159 community boards created. Community boards had been preceded as sub-municipal bodies by community councils, 139 of which existed at the time of the 1989 reforms.

In 2010, 28 community boards were disestablished when the Auckland Council was formed.

== Legal status ==
Under the provisions of the Local Government Act 2002, community boards are unincorporated bodies that are not local authorities nor a committee of the relevant territorial authority.

According to a lawyer at the Nelson law firm Fletcher Vautier Moore, unincorporated in this context refers to the fact that community boards do not exist outside their members; there is no separate legal person.

== Functions ==
Community boards are currently governed by the provisions of Part 4 of the Local Government Act 2002 and can be created, or dissolved by territorial authorities. In addition Auckland has 21 local boards and some councils have community committees.

Under the Local Electoral Act 2001, boards must have at least four members but not more than twelve. At least four must be elected members, but up to half can be appointed by the council.

Their purpose is to:

- represent and act as an advocate for the interests of the community;
- consider and report on any matter referred to it by their council, and any issues of interest to the community board;
- make an annual submission to their council on expenditure;
- maintain an overview of services provided by their council within the community; and
- communicate with community organisations and special interest groups in the community, and undertake any other responsibilities delegated by their council.

Boards can have powers delegated to them by councils, but cannot own land, or employ staff.

Levels of delegation vary greatly: 25 councils (60%) give boards power to make community grants, 11 (26%) power to run parks and reserves, 10 (24%) power to run community centres and sports and recreation and, in Southland, to spend up to $300,000 on projects. In Thames-Coromandel boards have control of local harbours, parks, halls, libraries, airfields, swimming pools, toilets, cemeteries, buses, planning, grants, economic development and bylaws.

== List of community boards ==
Territorial authority	Community boards
North Island
Far North District Council	Bay of Islands-Whangaroa Community Board; Te Hiku Community Board; Kaikohe-Hokianga Community Board
Thames-Coromandel District Council	Coromandel-Colville Community Board; Mercury Bay Community Board; Tairua/Pāuanui Community Board; Whangamatā Community Board; Thames Community Board
Waikato District Council	Huntly Community Board; Ngāruawāhia Community Board; Tuakau Community Board; Raglan Community Board; Taupiri Community Board; Rural-Port Waikato Community Board
Waipā District Council	Cambridge Community Board; Te Awamutu and Kihikihi Community Board
Ōtorohanga District Council	Ōtorohanga Community Board; Kawhia Community Board
South Waikato District Council	Tīrau Community Board
Western Bay of Plenty District Council	Katikati Community Board; Maketu Community Board; Ōmokoroa-Kaimai Community Board; Te Puke-Eastern Community Board; Waihī Beach Community Board
Whakatāne District Council	Whakatāne-Ōhope Community Board; Tāneatua Community Board; Rangitāiki Community Board; Murupara Community Board
Rotorua Lakes Council	Rotorua Lakes Community Board; Rotorua Rural Community Board
Ōpōtiki District Council	Coast Community Board
Ruapehu District Council	Ōwhango National Park Community Board; Waimarino-Waiouru Community Board; Taumarunui–Ōhura Community Board
New Plymouth District Council	Clifton Community Board; Inglewood Community Board; Kaitake Community Board; Waitara Community Board; Puketapu-Bell Block Community Board
South Taranaki District Council	Eltham-Kaponga Community Board; Pātea Community Board; Te Hāwera Community Board; Taranaki Coastal Community Board
Hastings District Council	Hastings Rural Community Board
Whanganui District Council	Whanganui Rural Community Board
Rangitīkei District Council	Taihape Community Board; Rātana Community Board
Horowhenua District Council	Te Awahou Foxton Community Board
Tararua District Council	Dannevirke Community Board; Eketāhuna Community Board
Kāpiti Coast District Council	Ōtaki; Paraparaumu; Raumati; Waikanae; Paekākāriki
Hutt City Council	Eastbourne Community Board; Wainuiomata Community Board
Wellington City Council	Tawa Community Board; Mākara/Ōhāriu Community Board
South Wairarapa District Council	Featherston; Greytown; Martinborough
South Island and Stewart Island / Rakiura
Tasman District Council	Golden Bay; Motueka
Buller District Council	Inangahua
Hurunui District Council	Hanmer Springs Community Board; South Ward Community Board
Waimakariri District Council	Kaiapoi-Tuahiwi; Rangiora-Ashley; Woodend-Sefton; Oxford-Ohoka
Selwyn District Council	Malvern
Christchurch City Council	Waimāero Fendalton-Waimairi-Harewood; Waipapa Papanui-Innes-Central; Waitai Coastal-Burwood-Linwood; Waihoro Spreydon-Cashmere-Heathcote; Waipuna Halswell-Hornby-Riccarton; Te Pātaka o Rākaihautū Banks Peninsula
Ashburton District Council	Methven
Timaru District Council	Geraldine; Pleasant Point; Temuka
Mackenzie District Council	Fairlie Community Board; Lake Tekapo Community Board; Twizel Community Board
Waitaki District Council	Ahuriri; Waihemo
Queenstown-Lakes District Council	Wānaka-Upper Clutha Community Board
Central Otago District Council	Cromwell; Maniototo; Teviot Valley; Vincent
Dunedin City Council	West Harbour; Mosgiel-Taieri; Otago Peninsula; Saddle Hill; Strath Taieri; Waikouaiti Coast
Clutha District Council	Lawrence-Tuapeka; West Otago
Gore District Council	Mataura
Invercargill City Council	Bluff
Southland District Council	Fiordland; Northern; Ardlussa; Tuatapere Te Waewae; Wallace Takitimu; Ōraka Aparima; Ōreti; Waihōpai Toetoe; Stewart Island-Rakiura

== Similar entities ==
The Auckland Council operates 21 local boards, which function similarly to community boards. They manage local events, libraries, parks and other facilities. Each local board has 5 to 9 elected members.

The Marlborough District Council operates the Picton Regional Forum, which was established after the local government decided to merge the former Picton Ward and the Pelorus/Northern Marlborough Sounds Ward into the single Marlborough Sounds Ward. It serves as a platform for local organisations to discuss and make recommendations on high-level strategic issues. Its members are officials from local companies, residents' associations and interest groups.
