= Okuku, New Zealand =

Locality in Canterbury, New Zealand

Okuku
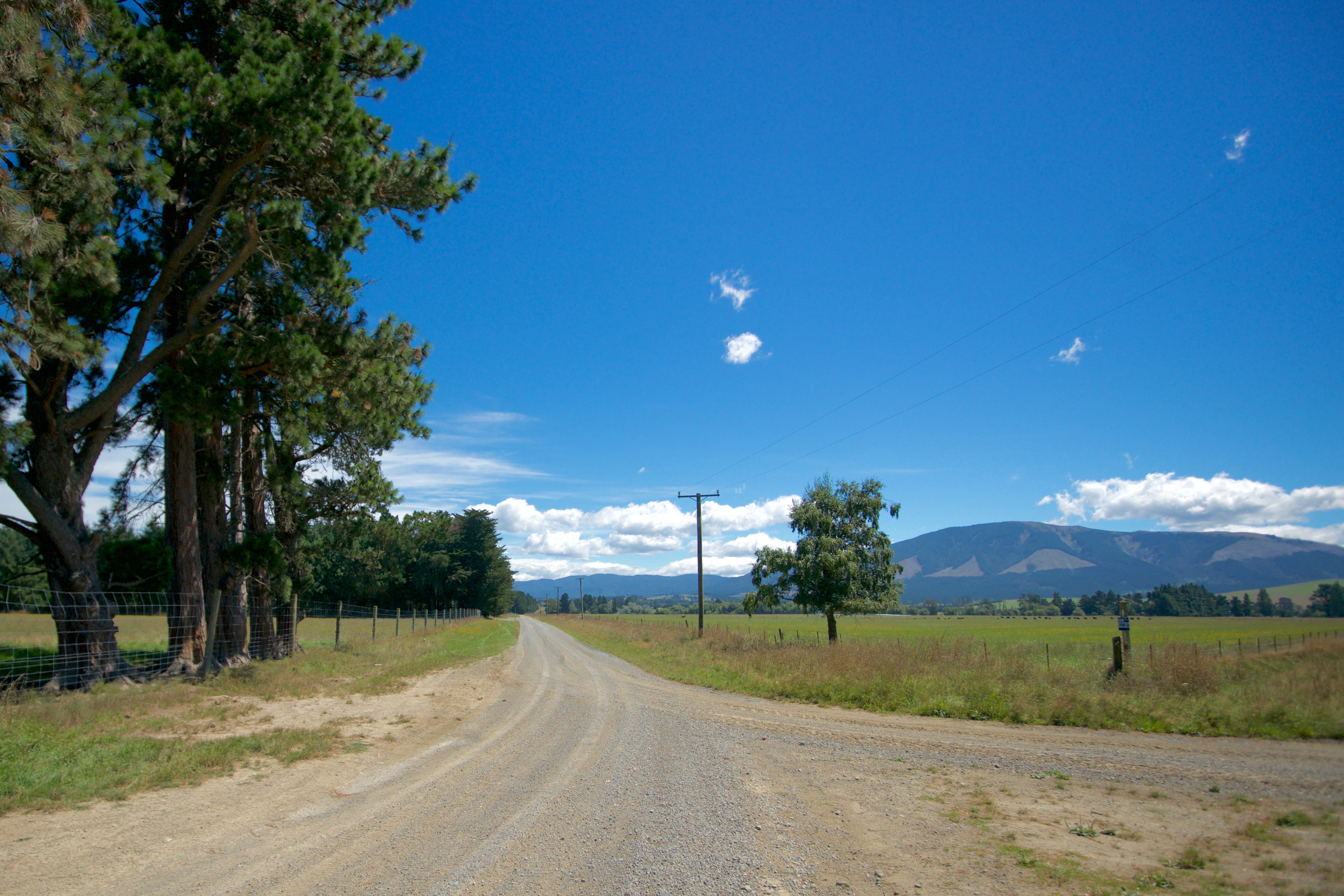
- Okuku countryside
- Interactive map of Okuku
- Coordinates: 43.246°S 172.452°E
- Country: New Zealand
- Region: Canterbury
- Territorial authority: Waimakariri District
- Ward: Oxford-Ohoka Ward; Rangiora-Ashley Ward
- Community: Oxford-Ohoka Community; Rangiora-Ashley Community
- Electorates: Kaikōura; Waimakariri; Te Tai Tonga

Government
  - Territorial Authority: Waimakariri District Council
  - Regional council: Environment Canterbury
  - Mayor of Waimakariri: Dan Gordon
  - Kaikoura/Waimakariri MPs: Stuart Smith/Matt Doocey
  - Te Tai Tonga MP: Tākuta Ferris

Area
  - Total: 75.68 km^{2} (29.22 sq mi)

Population (2023 census)
  - Total: 534
  - Density: 7.06/km^{2} (18.3/sq mi)

Okuku is a small farming community located in North Canterbury, New Zealand, lying 20 kilometres northwest of Rangiora. Okuku consists of a mix of flat and undulating farmland, and river beds that drain a catchment area in the foothills to the north. Okuku is bounded to the south by the Ashley River / Rakahuri (the major river in the area), to the east by the Okuku River, and to the west by the Garry River. Mount Thomas is the highest point at a height of 1023m.

== Demographics ==
Okuku locality covers 75.68 km^{2} (29.22 sq mi). It is part of the larger Okuku statistical area.

Historical population for Okuku locality
Year	Pop.	±% p.a.
2013	417	—
2018	510	+4.11%
2023	534	+0.92%

Okuku had a population of 534 in the 2023 New Zealand census, an increase of 24 people (4.7%) since the 2018 census, and an increase of 117 people (28.1%) since the 2013 census. There were 261 males and 267 females in 186 dwellings. 1.7% of people identified as LGBTIQ+. There were 105 people (19.7%) aged under 15 years, 78 (14.6%) aged 15 to 29, 276 (51.7%) aged 30 to 64, and 78 (14.6%) aged 65 or older.

People could identify as more than one ethnicity. The results were 94.9% European (Pākehā); 5.1% Māori; 1.7% Pasifika; 1.7% Asian; 0.6% Middle Eastern, Latin American and African New Zealanders (MELAA); and 5.6% other, which includes people giving their ethnicity as "New Zealander". English was spoken by 98.9%, Māori by 2.2%, Samoan by 0.6%, and other languages by 5.1%. No language could be spoken by 1.1% (e.g. too young to talk). New Zealand Sign Language was known by 0.6%. The percentage of people born overseas was 18.5, compared with 28.8% nationally.

Religious affiliations were 27.5% Christian, and 0.6% other religions. People who answered that they had no religion were 63.5%, and 7.9% of people did not answer the census question.

Of those at least 15 years old, 78 (18.2%) people had a bachelor's or higher degree, 273 (63.6%) had a post-high school certificate or diploma, and 90 (21.0%) people exclusively held high school qualifications. 42 people (9.8%) earned over $100,000 compared to 12.1% nationally. The employment status of those at least 15 was 231 (53.8%) full-time, 72 (16.8%) part-time, and 9 (2.1%) unemployed.

=== Okuku statistical area ===
The Okuku statistical area, which also includes Glentui, covers 834.79 km^{2} (322.31 sq mi). It had an estimated population of 780 as of June 2025, with a population density of 0.93 people per km^{2}.

Historical population for Okuku statistical area
Year	Pop.	±% p.a.
2006	495	—
2013	648	+3.92%
2018	726	+2.30%
2023	762	+0.97%

The statistical area had a population of 762 in the 2023 New Zealand census, an increase of 36 people (5.0%) since the 2018 census, and an increase of 114 people (17.6%) since the 2013 census. There were 378 males, 378 females, and 3 people of other genders in 267 dwellings. 1.2% of people identified as LGBTIQ+. The median age was 45.1 years (compared with 38.1 years nationally). There were 147 people (19.3%) aged under 15 years, 108 (14.2%) aged 15 to 29, 387 (50.8%) aged 30 to 64, and 120 (15.7%) aged 65 or older.

People could identify as more than one ethnicity. The results were 92.9% European (Pākehā); 5.9% Māori; 2.4% Pasifika; 2.4% Asian; 0.4% Middle Eastern, Latin American and African New Zealanders (MELAA); and 4.7% other, which includes people giving their ethnicity as "New Zealander". English was spoken by 98.0%, Māori by 2.0%, Samoan by 0.4%, and other languages by 4.7%. No language could be spoken by 1.6% (e.g. too young to talk). New Zealand Sign Language was known by 0.4%. The percentage of people born overseas was 17.7, compared with 28.8% nationally.

Religious affiliations were 30.7% Christian, 0.4% Māori religious beliefs, 0.4% Buddhist, 0.4% New Age, and 0.4% other religions. People who answered that they had no religion were 59.8%, and 8.3% of people did not answer the census question.

Of those at least 15 years old, 105 (17.1%) people had a bachelor's or higher degree, 381 (62.0%) had a post-high school certificate or diploma, and 129 (21.0%) people exclusively held high school qualifications. The median income was $38,400, compared with $41,500 nationally. 48 people (7.8%) earned over $100,000 compared to 12.1% nationally. The employment status of those at least 15 was 342 (55.6%) full-time, 102 (16.6%) part-time, and 6 (1.0%) unemployed.
