= Waimakariri District =

- Territorial authority district
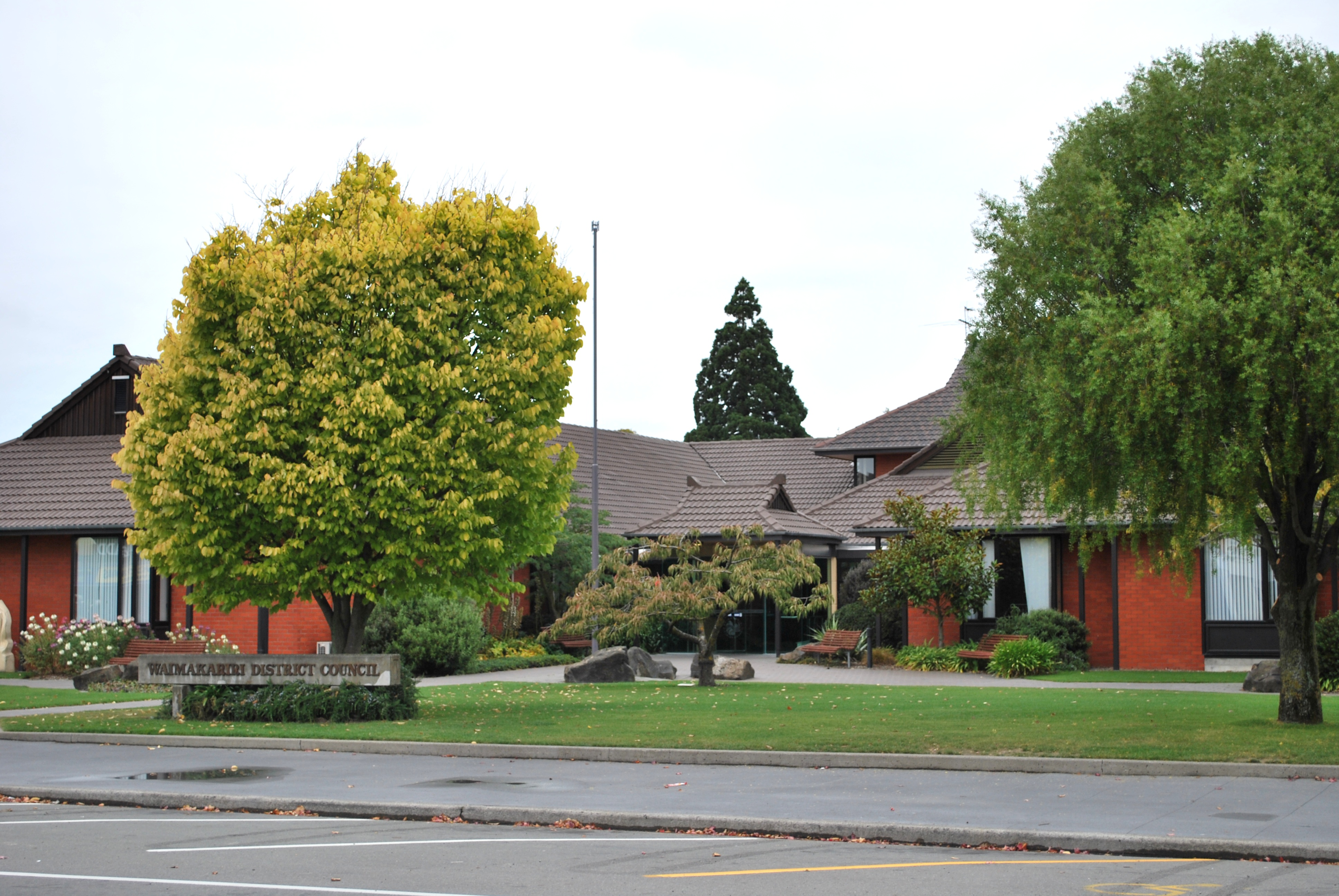
- Council offices in Rangiora

- Coat of arms

- Waimakariri district in the South Island
- Coordinates: 43°18′S 172°18′E
- Country: New Zealand
- Island: South Island (Te Waipounamu)
- Region: Canterbury
- Communities: Kaiapoi-Tuahiwi; Woodend-Sefton; Oxford-Ohoka; Rangiora-Ashley
- Wards: Kaiapoi-Woodend; Oxford-Ohoka; Rangiora-Ashley
- Established: 1989
- Named for: Waimakariri River
- Seat: Rangiora
- Towns: List: Ashley; Burnt Hill; Clarkville; Coopers Creek; Cust; Eyrewell Forest; Fernside; Flaxton; Glentui; Kaiapoi; Kairaki; Lees Valley; Loburn; Ohoka; Okuku; Okuku Range; Oxford; Pegasus; Rangiora; Sefton; Starvation Hill; Swannanoa; The Pines Beach; Tuahiwi; View Hill; Waikuku Beach; Waikuku; West Eyreton; Woodend; Woodend Beach

Government
  - Mayor: Dan Gordon
  - Territorial authority: Waimakariri District Council

Area
  - Total: 2,217.13 km^{2} (856.04 sq mi)

Population (June 2025)
  - Total: 69,800
  - Density: 31.5/km^{2} (81.5/sq mi)
- Demonym: Waimakaririan
- Time zone: UTC+12 (NZST)
  - Summer (DST): UTC+13 (NZDT)
- Postcode(s): Map of postcodes
- Area Code: 03
- Website: www.waimakariri.govt.nz

Waimakariri District is a local government district, located in the Canterbury Region of New Zealand's South Island. It is named after the Waimakariri River, which forms the district's southern boundary, separating it from Christchurch City and the Selwyn District. It is bounded in the north by the Hurunui District and in the east by the Pacific Ocean.

The district was established on 1 April 1989 following the merger of Rangiora District and Eyre County. The district covers 2,217.12 square kilometres (856.03 sq mi), and is home to 69,800 people. Rangiora is the district seat and largest town, with other major towns including Kaiapoi, Oxford, Pegasus and Woodend.

The current district mayor is Dan Gordon, who was elected in the 2019 local body elections.

== Geography ==
The Waimakariri District lies to the north of the Waimakariri River in North Canterbury. The major urban areas are Rangiora and Kaiapoi, which are respectively about 30 and 20 minutes travelling time by car from the centre of Christchurch City.

There are other urban settlements, including Woodend and Oxford, as well as a number of village and beach settlements.

The District occupies some 225,000 hectares, and extends from Pegasus Bay in the east to the Puketeraki Range in the west. It is bounded to the north by the Hurunui District.

=== Urban areas and settlements ===
The Waimakariri district has five towns with a population over 1,000. Together, they are home to 64.4% of the district's population.

Urban area	Population (June 2025)	% of district
Rangiora	19,300	27.7%
Kaiapoi	13,700	19.6%
Woodend	5,470	7.8%
Pegasus	4,260	6.1%
Oxford	2,250	3.2%

Other settlements and localities in the district include:

- Kaiapoi-Woodend Ward:
  - Kaiapoi-Tuahiwi Sub-Division:
    - Clarkville
    - Kaiapoi
    - Kairaki
    - Ohapuku
    - The Pines Beach
    - Flaxton
    - Tuahiwi
  - Woodend-Sefton Sub-Division:
    - Coldstream
    - Pegasus
    - Saltwater Creek
    - Sefton
    - Waikuku
    - Waikuku Beach
    - Woodend
    - Woodend Beach
- Oxford-Ohoka Ward:
  - Ohoka-Swannanoa Sub-Division:
    - Eyreton
    - Eyrewell
    - Mandeville North
    - Ohoka
    - Swannanoa
    - West Eyreton
    - Wetheral
    - Wilsons Siding
  - Oxford Sub-Division:
    - Ashley Forest
    - Ashley Gorge
    - Bennetts
    - Bexley
    - Burnt Hill
    - Carleton
    - Coopers Creek
    - Gammans Creek
    - Glenburn
    - Glentui
    - Horrellville
    - Lees Valley
    - Oxford
    - Okuku Range
    - Rockford
    - Starvation Hill
    - The Warren
    - View Hill
    - Okuku Hills
- Rangiora-Ashley Ward:
  - Ashley Sub-Division:
    - Ashley
    - Loburn
    - Loburn North
    - Okuku
    - Whiterock
    - Cust
    - Fernside
    - Springbank
    - Summerhill
  - Rangiora Sub-Division:
    - Rangiora
    - Southbrook

== History ==
In pre-European times, there were several important Ngāi Tahu settlements in the area now occupied by the Waimakariri District. The centre of Ngāi Tahu was the pā (fort) of Taurakautahi, known as Kaiapoi. Today, the hapū Ngāi Tūāhuriri is based at Tuahiwi, to the north of Kaiapoi. People who identify themselves as having Māori ancestry presently represent 8.5% of the District's population, and most of these people live in the eastern part of the District.

During the early years of European settlement, Kaiapoi developed as a river port. Rangiora was the area's main market town, and the development of Oxford was based on timber milling. The roles of the District's main urban areas have changed during recent years, mainly as the result of the rapid population growth.

During the colonial era, the area was also known as Courtenay, but the Maori name Waimakariri ultimately prevailed. The township of Courtenay is today part of the Selwyn District. The name Waimakariri translates from te reo Māori to 'cold water', referring to the snow melt source of the river in the Southern Alps.

European settlement concentrated on the fertile soils of the plains. Until the middle of the 20th century, extensive agricultural and pastoral farming predominated. More recently, horticultural and forestry have gained in importance. Today, some 11% of the District's labour force is now involved with agriculture, forestry and fishing.

== Demographics ==
Waimakariri District covers 2,217.13 km^{2} (856.04 sq mi) and had an estimated population of 69,800 as of June 2025, with a population density of 31 people per km^{2}.

The district has experienced a rapidly growing population that is predicted to continue to increase. Despite rapid growth, Waimakariri has retained its rural/small-town character and a high proportion of residents are involved in an extensive range of community and recreational organisations.

Historical population
Year	Pop.	±% p.a.
1991	27,884	—
1996	32,346	+3.01%
2001	36,900	+2.67%
2006	42,834	+3.03%
2013	49,989	+2.23%
2018	59,502	+3.55%
2023	66,246	+2.17%

Waimakariri District had a population of 66,246 in the 2023 New Zealand census, an increase of 6,744 people (11.3%) since the 2018 census, and an increase of 16,257 people (32.5%) since the 2013 census. There were 32,415 males, 33,621 females and 207 people of other genders in 25,539 dwellings. 2.5% of people identified as LGBTIQ+. The median age was 44.7 years (compared with 38.1 years nationally). There were 11,748 people (17.7%) aged under 15 years, 10,143 (15.3%) aged 15 to 29, 30,168 (45.5%) aged 30 to 64, and 14,187 (21.4%) aged 65 or older.

People could identify as more than one ethnicity. The results were 92.1% European (Pākehā); 9.9% Māori; 1.6% Pasifika; 3.8% Asian; 0.7% Middle Eastern, Latin American and African New Zealanders (MELAA); and 2.7% other, which includes people giving their ethnicity as "New Zealander". English was spoken by 97.7%, Māori language by 1.8%, Samoan by 0.2% and other languages by 6.6%. No language could be spoken by 1.9% (e.g. too young to talk). New Zealand Sign Language was known by 0.5%. The percentage of people born overseas was 18.1, compared with 28.8% nationally.

Religious affiliations were 31.1% Christian, 0.5% Hindu, 0.2% Islam, 0.3% Māori religious beliefs, 0.3% Buddhist, 0.5% New Age, and 1.3% other religions. People who answered that they had no religion were 57.9%, and 8.1% of people did not answer the census question.

Of those at least 15 years old, 7,200 (13.2%) people had a bachelor's or higher degree, 31,890 (58.5%) had a post-high school certificate or diploma, and 13,035 (23.9%) people exclusively held high school qualifications. The median income was $40,200, compared with $41,500 nationally. 5,850 people (10.7%) earned over $100,000 compared to 12.1% nationally. The employment status of those at least 15 was that 26,910 (49.4%) people were employed full-time, 8,304 (15.2%) were part-time, and 981 (1.8%) were unemployed.

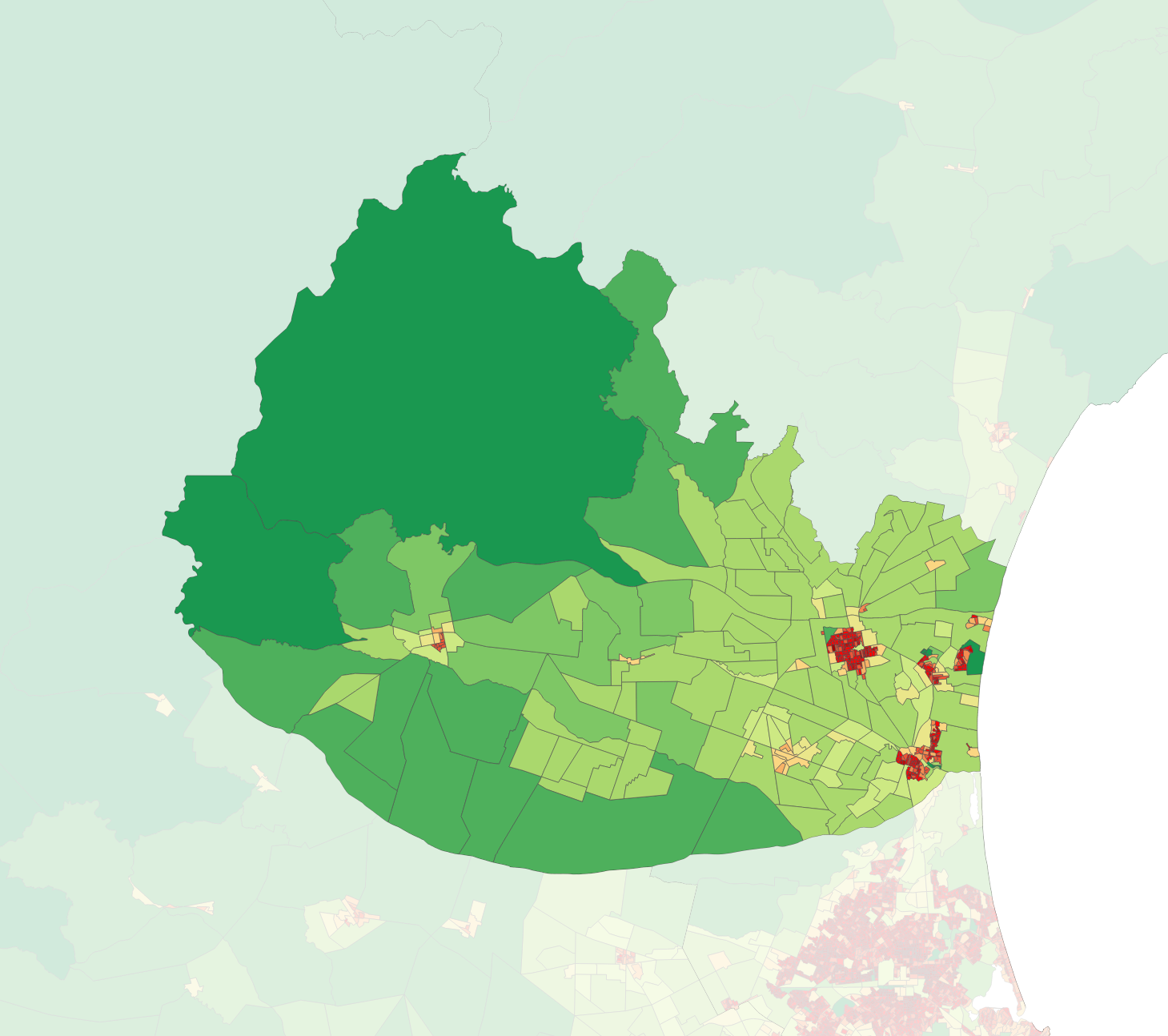
Population density in the 2023 census

Individual wards
Name	Area (km^{2})	Population	Density (per km^{2})	Dwellings	Median age	Median income
Oxford-Ohoka Ward	1,619.81	12,906	8.0	4,638	44.8 years	$43,600
Rangiora-Ashley Ward	443.29	26,478	59.7	10,434	46.9 years	$37,100
Kaiapoi-Woodend Ward	154.02	26,859	174.4	10,464	42.4 years	$42,200
New Zealand					38.1 years	$41,500

== Economy ==
The Waimakariri District has a modelled gross domestic product (GDP) of $2,425 million in the year to March 2024, 0.6% of New Zealand's national GDP. The GDP per capita is $42,699, ranking it third-lowest out of 66 territorial authorities (ahead of South Wairarapa District and Kapiti Coast District).

A large portion of the Waimakariri District has fertile flat land, or highly productive rolling downs. Much of the land to the east of Rangiora is reclaimed swamp, which is still subject to poor drainage and occasional flooding.

The north-western portion of the District is hill and high country. These hills, including Mt Oxford, Mt Richardson, Mt Thomas and Mt Grey, dominate the District's western landscape.

Historically, the District was dominated by extensive agricultural and pastoral farming activity, with few major industries. More recently, many new small holdings have been created; some of these are used for full-time or part-time horticultural enterprises, including vegetable and flower growing.

The District has a few major industries. A large fibreboard plant at Sefton draws on local wood resources. The other industries are mainly small-scale service and processing enterprises, some of which also use local wood resources.

The Waimakariri District has a high standard of communications. The South Island Main Trunk Railway and State Highway 1 cross the eastern portion of the District. The District also has an airfield at Rangiora, and is close to the Christchurch International Airport. Telecommunications are continually being upgraded.

== Recreation ==
The District offers a wide range of recreation. It has sandy beaches, estuaries, river gorges and braided rivers, which offer a range of choices for fishing, boating and rafting.

The famous Waimakariri River provides opportunities to jet boat, kayak and fish, and sandy beaches are nearby. The District also offers the opportunity to enjoy sailing on Pegasus Lake, horse riding, farm tours and weekly farmers' markets.

The foothills and mountains offer a variety of tramping experiences, which complement a growing range of walking trails and formal recreational areas throughout the District.

== Education ==
The Waimakariri District is served by 20 state and three state-integrated primary schools, as well as two area schools covering years 1–13, one in Oxford and one in Rangiora (Rangiora New Life), and two secondary schools: Rangiora High School and Kaiapoi High School. Many of the primary schools are well-supported by the community, and an increasing number of pre-schools have begun to open in the District.
