= Clarkville, New Zealand =

Rural area in Canterbury, New Zealand

Clarkville
- Rural area
- Interactive map of Clarkville
- Coordinates: 43.40571°S 172.626226°E
- Country: New Zealand
- Region: Canterbury
- Territorial authority: Waimakariri District
- Ward: Oxford-Ohoka Ward; Kaiapoi-Woodend Ward
- Community: Oxford-Ohoka Community; Kaiapoi-Woodend Community
- Electorates: Waimakariri; Te Tai Tonga (Māori)

Government
  - Territorial Authority: Waimakariri District Council
  - Regional council: Environment Canterbury
  - Mayor of Waimakariri: Dan Gordon
  - Waimakariri MP: Matt Doocey
  - Te Tai Tonga MP: Tākuta Ferris

Area
  - Total: 30.13 km^{2} (11.63 sq mi)

Population (June 2025)
  - Total: 1,450
  - Density: 48.1/km^{2} (125/sq mi)
- Time zone: UTC+12 (NZST)
  - Summer (DST): UTC+13 (NZDT)
- Postcode: 7692
- Area code: 03
- Local iwi: Ngāi Tahu

Clarkville is a small rural town in the Waimakariri District, New Zealand. As of June 2025, Clarkville had a population of 1,450.

== History ==
Clarkville was originally known as Kaiapoi Island, because it was in between two equally large branches of the Waimakariri River. This led to the area being flooded often by the unpredictable Waimakariri River. In the 1860s, farmers cut a new course for the river and choked the north branch, rendering it just a stream, known today as Silverstream, of which the Silverstream Estate (where Mitre 10 Dream Home 2013 was located) was named after. In 1880, the name was changed to Clarkville, in honour of Joseph Clark, who donated land for the local school.
In 1919, The Clarkville Hall Association, Incorporated, erected a community hall. It is called the Clarkville Peace Hall, and still stands today, along with an enlargement in 1970.

== Education ==
Clarkville Te Kura ki Waimātao is Clarkville's only school. It is a decile 9 state co-educational full primary, with 186 students (as of March 2026). It opened in 1874 as Kaiapoi Island School and changed its name to Clarkville School in 1889. It took its current name in 2022.

== Demographics ==
Clarkville statistical area covers 30.13 km^{2} (11.63 sq mi). It had an estimated population of 1,450 as of June 2025, with a population density of 48 people per km^{2}.

Historical population
Year	Pop.	±% p.a.
1901	253	—
2006	1,122	+1.43%
2013	1,320	+2.35%
2018	1,401	+1.20%
2023	1,377	−0.34%

Clarkville had a population of 1,377 in the 2023 New Zealand census, a decrease of 24 people (−1.7%) since the 2018 census, and an increase of 57 people (4.3%) since the 2013 census. There were 696 males, 669 females, and 9 people of other genders in 498 dwellings. 2.6% of people identified as LGBTIQ+. The median age was 48.4 years (compared with 38.1 years nationally). There were 222 people (16.1%) aged under 15 years, 207 (15.0%) aged 15 to 29, 666 (48.4%) aged 30 to 64, and 282 (20.5%) aged 65 or older.

People could identify as more than one ethnicity. The results were 93.7% European (Pākehā); 8.5% Māori; 1.3% Pasifika; 2.6% Asian; 0.9% Middle Eastern, Latin American and African New Zealanders (MELAA); and 3.1% other, which includes people giving their ethnicity as "New Zealander". English was spoken by 98.0%, Māori by 1.3%, and other languages by 6.1%. No language could be spoken by 1.3% (e.g. too young to talk). New Zealand Sign Language was known by 0.7%. The percentage of people born overseas was 13.7, compared with 28.8% nationally.

Religious affiliations were 31.8% Christian, 0.2% Hindu, 0.2% Buddhist, 0.2% New Age, and 0.4% other religions. People who answered that they had no religion were 59.7%, and 7.4% of people did not answer the census question.

Of those at least 15 years old, 285 (24.7%) people had a bachelor's or higher degree, 654 (56.6%) had a post-high school certificate or diploma, and 216 (18.7%) people exclusively held high school qualifications. The median income was $47,900, compared with $41,500 nationally. 222 people (19.2%) earned over $100,000 compared to 12.1% nationally. The employment status of those at least 15 was 603 (52.2%) full-time, 222 (19.2%) part-time, and 18 (1.6%) unemployed.

== Climate ==
The average temperature in summer is 16.6 °C, and in winter is 6.4 °C.

Month	Normal temperature
January	17.2 °C
February	16.7 °C
March	15.2 °C
April	12.2 °C
May	8.8 °C
June	6.2 °C
July	5.8 °C
August	7.1 °C
September	9.4 °C
October	11.8 °C
November	13.9 °C
December	15.9 °C
