= Pegasus, New Zealand =

Town in Canterbury, New Zealand

Pegasus
- Small urban area
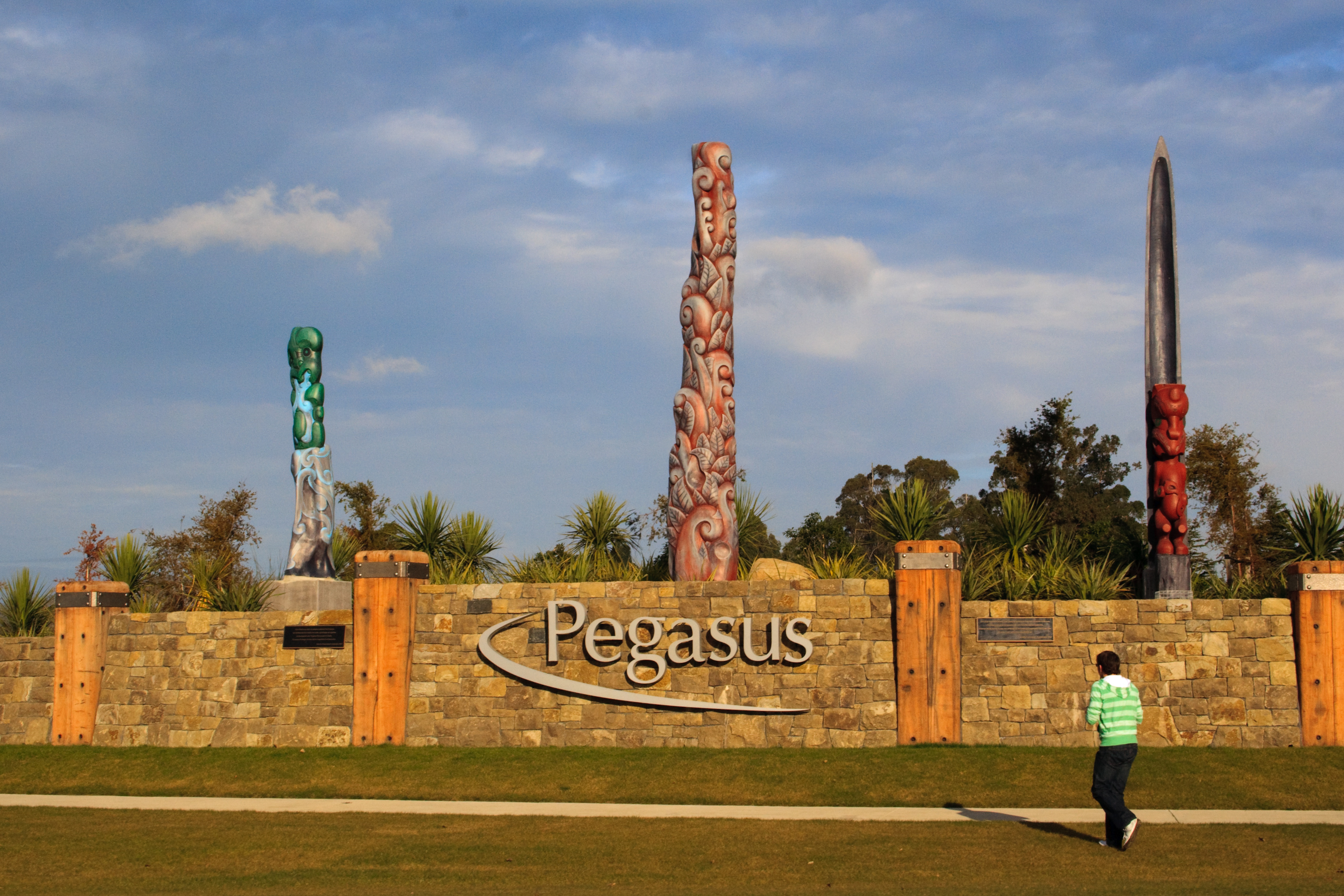
- Entrance feature at Pegasus
- Interactive map of Pegasus
- Coordinates: 43.31439°S 172.697521°E
- Country: New Zealand
- Region: Canterbury
- Territorial authority: Waimakariri District
- Ward: Kaiapoi-Woodend Ward
- Community: Kaiapoi-Woodend Community
- Construction began: 2006
- Electorates: Waimakariri; Te Tai Tonga (Māori)

Government
  - Territorial Authority: Waimakariri District Council
  - Regional council: Environment Canterbury
  - Mayor of Waimakariri: Dan Gordon
  - Waimakariri MP: Matt Doocey
  - Te Tai Tonga MP: Tākuta Ferris

Area
  - Total: 6.34 km^{2} (2.45 sq mi)

Population (June 2025)
  - Total: 4,260
  - Density: 672/km^{2} (1,740/sq mi)
- Time zone: UTC+12 (NZST)
  - Summer (DST): UTC+13 (NZDT)
- Postcode(s): 7612
- Area code: 03
- Website: www.pegasus-town.co.nz

Pegasus is a new town in the Waimakariri District of Canterbury, New Zealand. Named for the nearby Pegasus Bay, it is adjacent to the town of Woodend and is 25 km north of Christchurch. Once fully constructed, Pegasus will be home to up to 6000 people. The town will have approximately 1700 residential house sites. Retail and office space is located in the centre of the town adjacent to Lake Pegasus.

The project was first proposed in 1997 by Southern Capital and was initially developed by Infinity Investment Group of Wānaka. The project ran into financial trouble in late 2012, with the developers going into receivership. Todd Property bought it for an undisclosed sum in December 2012 and undertook infrastructure development to complete the project, selling to the Templeton Group in 2019.

== History ==
The master-planned design of town was the brainchild of businessman Bob Robertson. This was a first for New Zealand, and the initial marketing involved a gala auction event around a scale model of the project.

- Mid 2006, major earthworks and site contouring began
- December 2007, discovery of an early pā on the golf course site
- January 2008, first titles to land in the town were issued
- September 2008, first residents moved into the town
- November 2008, showhome village opened
- December 2009, Pegasus Golf & Sports Club, Lake Pegasus

As at May 2016 over 90% of all Pegasus sections have been titled and sold. Over 950 houses have been completed or are currently under construction and the population is now over 2500.

At the heart of the town, Lake Pegasus has become a venue for regional and national sporting events including national triathlons, dragon boat regattas, dive schools and sailing events.

The community centre opened in August 2017.

In October 2019, Todd Property sold its property interests to Templeton group, a major partner in NZ Prop Co Ltd. (NZPL).

== Demographics ==
Pegasus is described by Stats NZ as a small urban area and covers 6.34 km^{2} (2.45 sq mi). It had an estimated population of 4,260 as of June 2025, with a population density of 672 people per km^{2}.

Historical population
Year	Pop.	±% p.a.
2006	18	—
2013	1,017	+77.95%
2018	2,637	+20.99%
2023	3,915	+8.22%

Pegasus had a population of 3,915 in the 2023 New Zealand census, an increase of 1,278 people (48.5%) since the 2018 census, and an increase of 2,898 people (285.0%) since the 2013 census. There were 1,914 males, 1,992 females, and 12 people of other genders in 1,497 dwellings. 2.3% of people identified as LGBTIQ+. The median age was 42.6 years (compared with 38.1 years nationally). There were 777 people (19.8%) aged under 15 years, 525 (13.4%) aged 15 to 29, 1,869 (47.7%) aged 30 to 64, and 744 (19.0%) aged 65 or older.

People could identify as more than one ethnicity. The results were 90.7% European (Pākehā); 8.5% Māori; 1.7% Pasifika; 5.7% Asian; 1.4% Middle Eastern, Latin American and African New Zealanders (MELAA); and 2.5% other, which includes people giving their ethnicity as "New Zealander". English was spoken by 97.2%, Māori by 1.3%, Samoan by 0.2%, and other languages by 11.3%. No language could be spoken by 2.1% (e.g. too young to talk). New Zealand Sign Language was known by 0.2%. The percentage of people born overseas was 29.3, compared with 28.8% nationally.

Religious affiliations were 33.7% Christian, 0.7% Hindu, 0.5% Islam, 0.2% Māori religious beliefs, 0.2% Buddhist, 0.4% New Age, and 1.7% other religions. People who answered that they had no religion were 56.5%, and 6.2% of people did not answer the census question.

Of those at least 15 years old, 798 (25.4%) people had a bachelor's or higher degree, 1,728 (55.1%) had a post-high school certificate or diploma, and 612 (19.5%) people exclusively held high school qualifications. The median income was $48,800, compared with $41,500 nationally. 489 people (15.6%) earned over $100,000 compared to 12.1% nationally. The employment status of those at least 15 was 1,695 (54.0%) full-time, 459 (14.6%) part-time, and 60 (1.9%) unemployed.

== Education ==
Pegasus Bay School is a state co-educational full primary school located on Solander Road, with a roll of 402 students (as of March 2026). The school was formed from the previous Waikuku School, established in 1873, which had outgrown its original Waikuku site. The school relocated to its current site over the two-week term break in April 2014, and was renamed Pegasus Bay School.

For secondary education, the town is zoned for Kaiapoi High School, 13 km away in Kaiapoi. The town was previously also zoned for Rangiora High School, 10 km away in Rangiora, but overcrowding at Rangiora and the need to balance the student population between Rangiora and Kaiapoi led the boundary move to exclude Pegasus, Woodend and Waikuku.

== Sources ==
- Official website
