= Sefton, New Zealand =

Town in Canterbury, New Zealand

Sefton
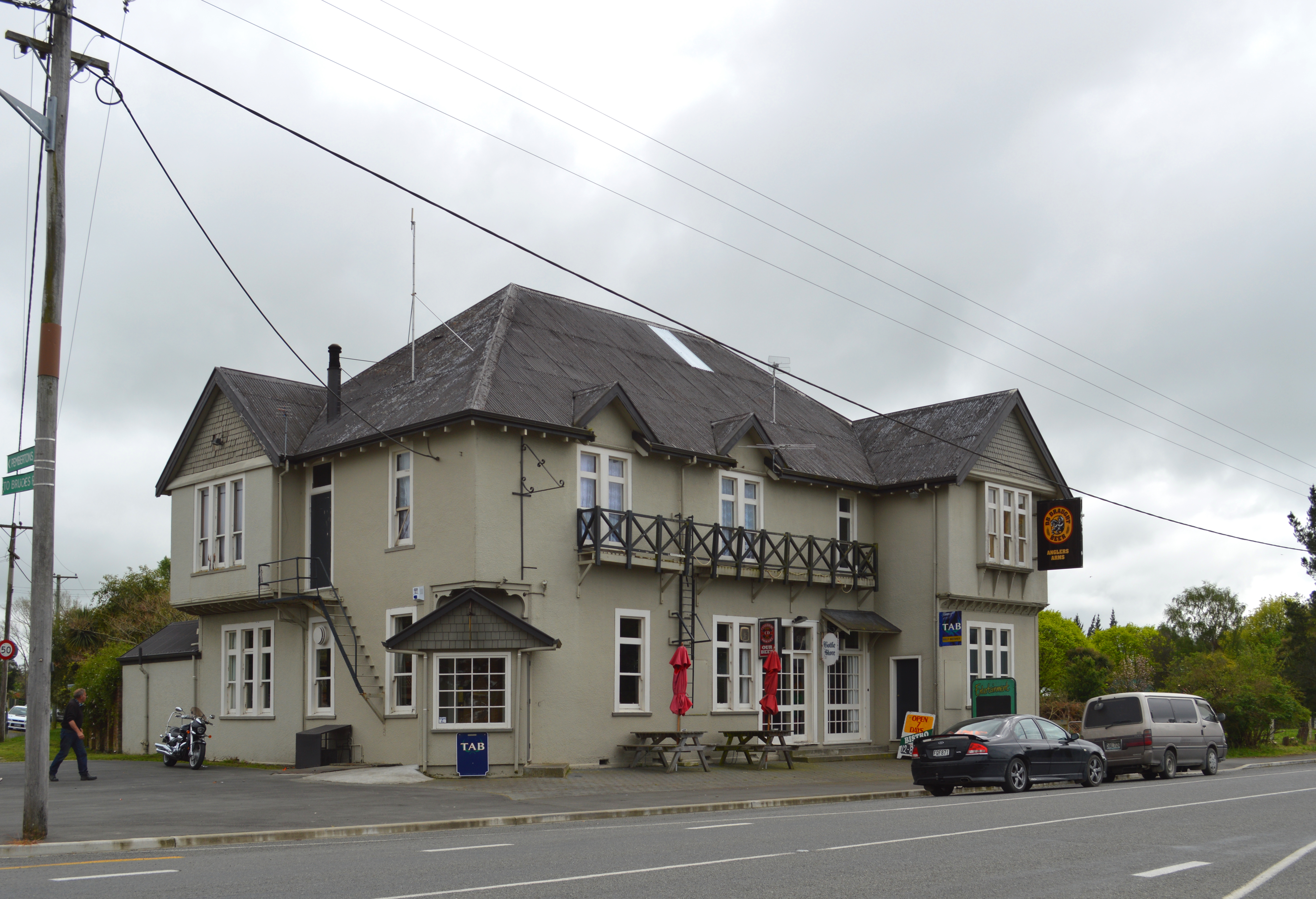
- Anglers Arms Tavern in Sefton
- Interactive map of Sefton
- Coordinates: 43.247°S 172.667°E
- Country: New Zealand
- Region: Canterbury
- Territorial authority: Waimakariri District
- Ward: Kaiapoi-Woodend Ward
- Community: Woodend-Sefton Community
- Electorates: Kaikōura; Te Tai Tonga (Māori)

Government
  - Territorial Authority: Waimakariri District Council
  - Regional council: Environment Canterbury
  - Mayor of Waimakariri: Dan Gordon
  - Kaikōura MP: Stuart Smith
  - Te Tai Tonga MP: Tākuta Ferris

Area
  - Total: 0.87 km^{2} (0.34 sq mi)

Population (June 2025)
  - Total: 270
  - Density: 310/km^{2} (800/sq mi)
- Time zone: UTC+12 (NZST)
  - Summer (DST): UTC+13 (NZDT)
- Postcode: 7472
- Area code: 03

Sefton is a small town in the Waimakariri District, New Zealand, about 23 kilometres (14 miles) from Christchurch.

In 1886, it had a census population of 276 and was a station on the Christchurch Ashley line. In 1891 it had a population of 390, of which 202 were male and 188 were female. In the 2018 census, the population was 207.

== Education ==
Sefton has one school: Te Waitai Sefton School. It is a state co-educational full primary, with 121 students (as of July 2026). The principal is Heidi Moeller-Kemp. It opened in 1884. Balcairn School (opened 1878) merged with Sefton in 1930, Salwater Creek School (opened 1865) merged in 1951, and Mt Grey Downs School (extant 1869) in 1963.

== Demographics ==
Sefton is described by Stats NZ as a rural settlement and covers 0.87 km^{2} (0.34 sq mi). It had an estimated population of 270 as of June 2025, with a population density of 310 people per km^{2}. Sefton is part of the larger Ashley-Sefton statistical area.

Historical population
Year	Pop.	±% p.a.
2006	231	—
2013	225	−0.38%
2018	207	−1.65%
2023	255	+4.26%

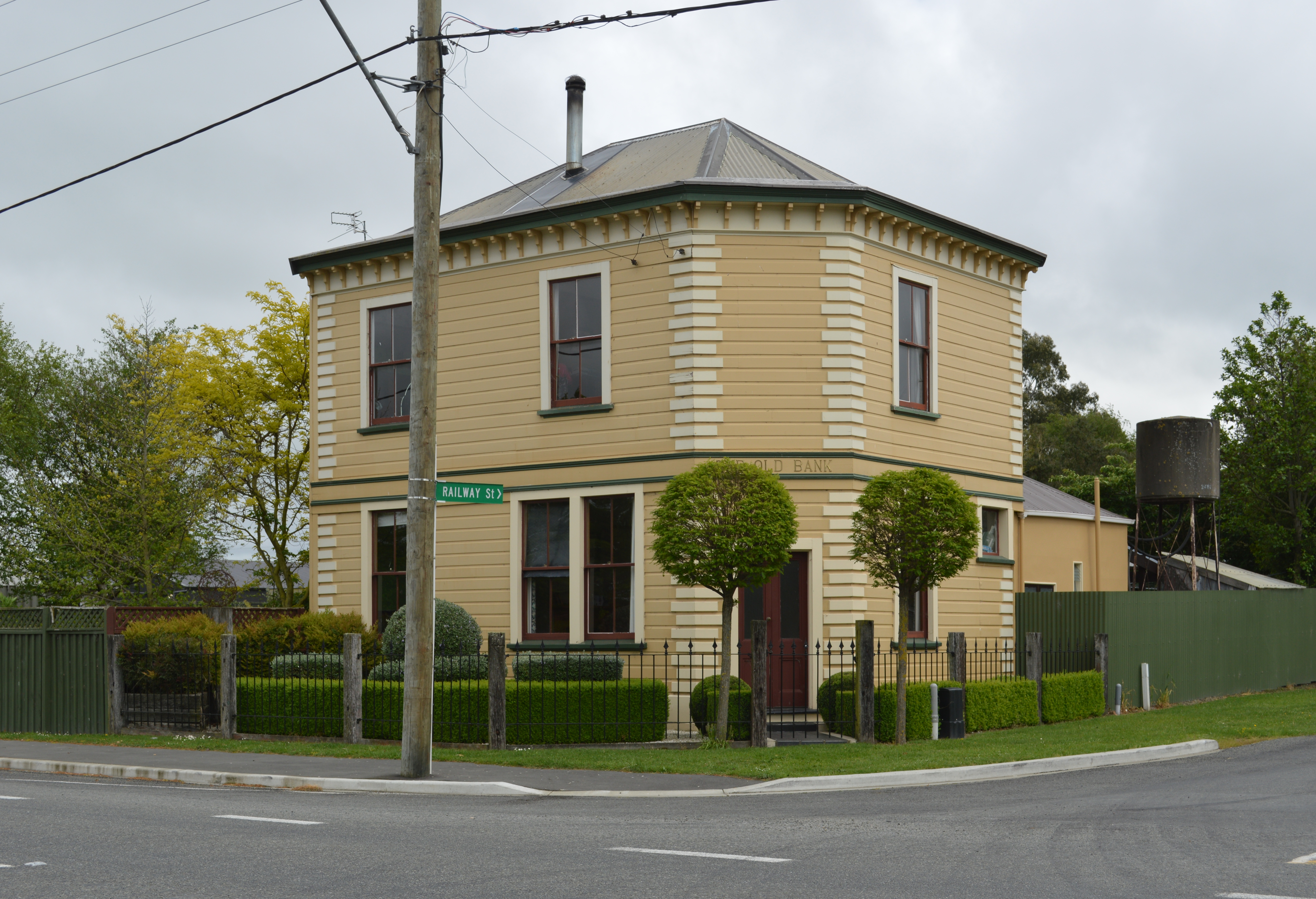
Old bank building

Sefton had a population of 255 in the 2023 New Zealand census, an increase of 48 people (23.2%) since the 2018 census, and an increase of 30 people (13.3%) since the 2013 census. There were 144 males, 111 females, and 3 people of other genders in 99 dwellings. 5.9% of people identified as LGBTIQ+. The median age was 37.1 years (compared with 38.1 years nationally). There were 54 people (21.2%) aged under 15 years, 42 (16.5%) aged 15 to 29, 111 (43.5%) aged 30 to 64, and 48 (18.8%) aged 65 or older.

People could identify as more than one ethnicity. The results were 94.1% European (Pākehā), 10.6% Māori, 2.4% Pasifika, and 4.7% other, which includes people giving their ethnicity as "New Zealander". English was spoken by 98.8%, Māori by 1.2%, and other languages by 2.4%. No language could be spoken by 2.4% (e.g. too young to talk). The percentage of people born overseas was 8.2, compared with 28.8% nationally.

Religious affiliations were 21.2% Christian, and 1.2% other religions. People who answered that they had no religion were 69.4%, and 9.4% of people did not answer the census question.

Of those at least 15 years old, 30 (14.9%) people had a bachelor's or higher degree, 114 (56.7%) had a post-high school certificate or diploma, and 57 (28.4%) people exclusively held high school qualifications. The median income was $37,100, compared with $41,500 nationally. 9 people (4.5%) earned over $100,000 compared to 12.1% nationally. The employment status of those at least 15 was 99 (49.3%) full-time, 39 (19.4%) part-time, and 6 (3.0%) unemployed.
