= Mandeville North =

Settlement in Canterbury, New Zealand

- Town
- Interactive map of Mandeville North
- Coordinates: 43°23′S 172°32′E
- Country: New Zealand
- Region: Canterbury
- Territorial authority: Waimakariri District
- Ward: Oxford-Ohoka Ward
- Community: Oxford-Ohoka Community
- Electorates: Waimakariri; Te Tai Tonga (Māori)

Government
  - Territorial Authority: Waimakariri District Council
  - Regional council: Environment Canterbury
  - Mayor of Waimakariri: Dan Gordon
  - Waimakariri MP: Matt Doocey
  - Te Tai Tonga MP: Tākuta Ferris

Area
  - Total: 6.36 km^{2} (2.46 sq mi)

Population (June 2025)
  - Total: 1,980
  - Density: 311/km^{2} (806/sq mi)
- Time zone: UTC+12 (NZST)
  - Summer (DST): UTC+13 (NZDT)
- Postcode: 7692
- Area code: 03

Mandeville North (commonly referred to as Mandeville) is a small village in the Waimakariri District of Canterbury, New Zealand. Due to new subdivisions being built in the area, the population has been slowly increasing, particularly after the 2011 Christchurch earthquake. The construction of the Mandeville village retail development began in late 2017 and was completed in early 2018.

The village is named after William Montagu, 7th Duke of Manchester who owned land in the area.

== Demographics ==
Mandeville statistical area covers 6.36 km^{2} (2.46 sq mi). It had an estimated population of 3,730 as of June 2025, with a population density of 92.3 people per km^{2}.

Historical population
Year	Pop.	±% p.a.
2013	981	—
2018	1,608	+10.39%
2023	1,878	+3.15%

Mandeville had a population of 1,878 in the 2023 New Zealand census, an increase of 270 people (16.8%) since the 2018 census, and an increase of 897 people (91.4%) since the 2013 census. There were 960 males, 912 females, and 6 people of other genders in 615 dwellings. 2.1% of people identified as LGBTIQ+. The median age was 43.8 years (compared with 38.1 years nationally). There were 396 people (21.1%) aged under 15 years, 249 (13.3%) aged 15 to 29, 960 (51.1%) aged 30 to 64, and 273 (14.5%) aged 65 or older.

People could identify as more than one ethnicity. The results were 96.2% European (Pākehā); 7.8% Māori; 0.8% Pasifika; 1.6% Asian; 0.5% Middle Eastern, Latin American and African New Zealanders (MELAA); and 2.9% other, which includes people giving their ethnicity as "New Zealander". English was spoken by 98.2%, Māori by 0.8%, and other languages by 4.6%. No language could be spoken by 1.4% (e.g. too young to talk). New Zealand Sign Language was known by 0.8%. The percentage of people born overseas was 16.1, compared with 28.8% nationally.

Religious affiliations were 30.5% Christian, 0.2% Islam, 0.2% New Age, and 1.1% other religions. People who answered that they had no religion were 61.2%, and 6.7% of people did not answer the census question.

Of those at least 15 years old, 330 (22.3%) people had a bachelor's or higher degree, 915 (61.7%) had a post-high school certificate or diploma, and 243 (16.4%) people exclusively held high school qualifications. The median income was $52,300, compared with $41,500 nationally. 315 people (21.3%) earned over $100,000 compared to 12.1% nationally. The employment status of those at least 15 was 807 (54.5%) full-time, 252 (17.0%) part-time, and 21 (1.4%) unemployed.

== Sports grounds ==
The Mandeville Sports Centre is located less than 1km south of the village centre. A number of sports are played at the complex, however, it is most well known as a cricket ground. Since 2008, the inaugural Canterbury Rodeo has been hosted here.
