= Flaxton =

Flaxton can refer to:

- Flaxton, New Zealand
- Flaxton, North Dakota, USA
- Flaxton, North Yorkshire, England
  - Flaxton Rural District, a former local government district
- Flaxton, Queensland, a locality in the Sunshine Coast Region, Australia
- The Flaxton Boys, a British historical children's television series
