= Ohoka =

Settlement in Canterbury, New Zealand

- Township
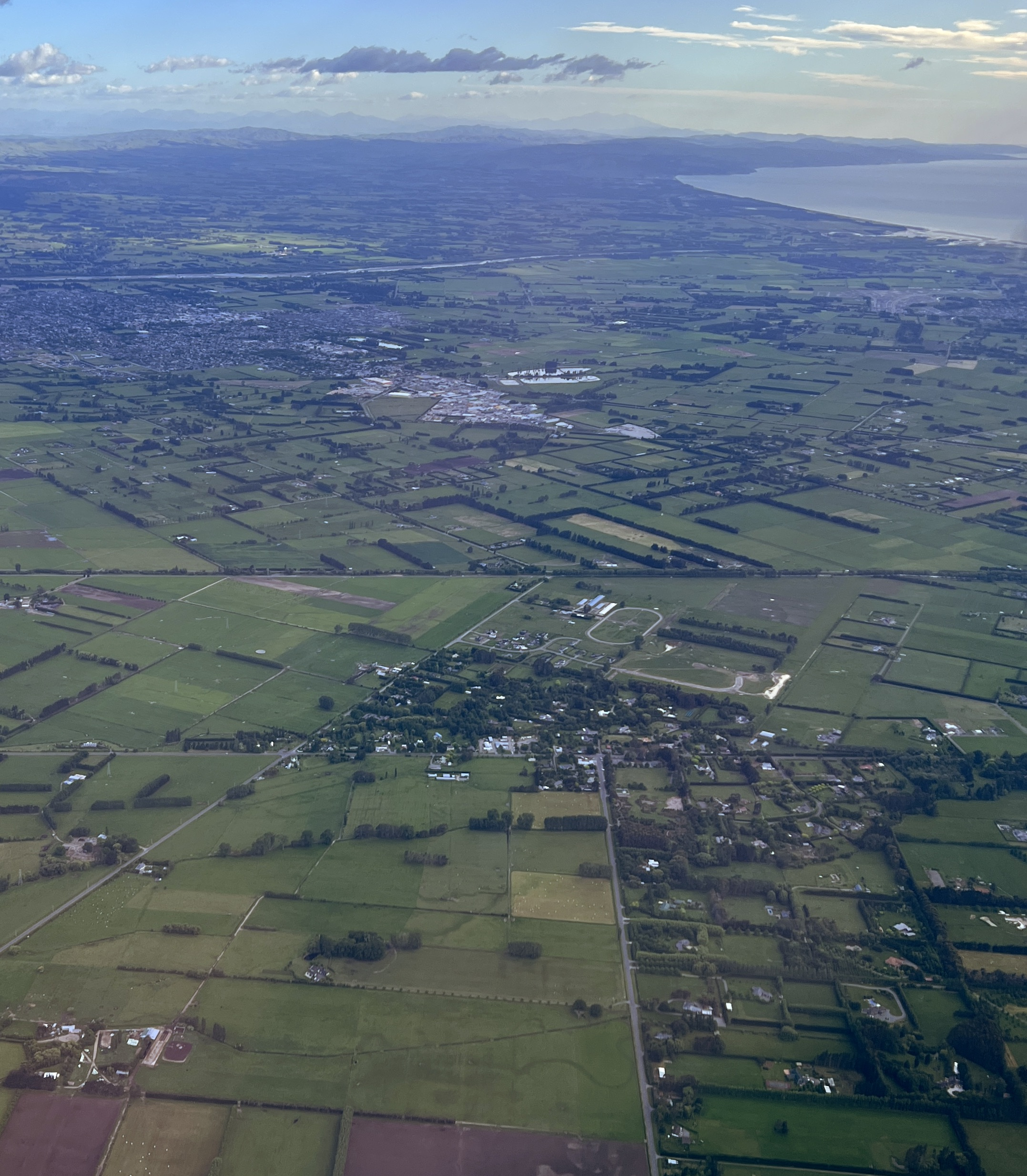
- Ohoka looking north, with Rangiora in the distance
- Interactive map of Ohoka
- Coordinates: 43°22′S 172°34′E
- Country: New Zealand
- Region: Canterbury
- Territorial authority: Waimakariri District
- Ward: Oxford-Ohoka Ward
- Community: Oxford-Ohoka Community
- Electorates: Waimakariri; Te Tai Tonga (Māori)

Government
  - Territorial Authority: Waimakariri District Council
  - Regional council: Environment Canterbury
  - Mayor of Waimakariri: Dan Gordon
  - Waimakariri MP: Matt Doocey
  - Te Tai Tonga MP: Tākuta Ferris

Area
  - Total: 3.74 km^{2} (1.44 sq mi)

Population (2023 Census)
  - Total: 345
  - Density: 92.2/km^{2} (239/sq mi)
- Time zone: UTC+12 (NZST)
  - Summer (DST): UTC+13 (NZDT)
- Postcode: 7692
- Area code: 03

Ohoka is a small semi-rural township on the northern outskirts of Christchurch in New Zealand.

The New Zealand Ministry for Culture and Heritage gives a translation of "place of the stake for a decoy parrot" for Ōhoka.

A new subdivision proposed in 2022 would add 800–850 houses, shops and a village square to Ohoka. Most residents are campaigning against the subdivision. In July 2026, the proposed subdivision was submitted for approval under the fast-track legislation.

== Demographics ==
Ohoka locality covers 3.74 km^{2} (1.44 sq mi). It is part of the larger Ohoka statistical area.

Historical population for Ohoka locality
Year	Pop.	±% p.a.
2006	297	—
2013	306	+0.43%
2018	297	−0.60%
2023	345	+3.04%

Ohoka had a population of 345 in the 2023 New Zealand census, an increase of 48 people (16.2%) since the 2018 census, and an increase of 39 people (12.7%) since the 2013 census. There were 177 males and 168 females in 126 dwellings. 3.5% of people identified as LGBTIQ+. There were 60 people (17.4%) aged under 15 years, 45 (13.0%) aged 15 to 29, 156 (45.2%) aged 30 to 64, and 84 (24.3%) aged 65 or older.

People could identify as more than one ethnicity. The results were 96.5% European (Pākehā); 7.0% Māori; 1.7% Asian; 0.9% Middle Eastern, Latin American and African New Zealanders (MELAA); and 1.7% other, which includes people giving their ethnicity as "New Zealander". English was spoken by 99.1%, Māori by 1.7%, and other languages by 7.8%. No language could be spoken by 1.7% (e.g. too young to talk). New Zealand Sign Language was known by 0.9%. The percentage of people born overseas was 21.7, compared with 28.8% nationally.

Religious affiliations were 43.5% Christian, and 1.7% other religions. People who answered that they had no religion were 44.3%, and 9.6% of people did not answer the census question.

Of those at least 15 years old, 81 (28.4%) people had a bachelor's or higher degree, 162 (56.8%) had a post-high school certificate or diploma, and 48 (16.8%) people exclusively held high school qualifications. 54 people (18.9%) earned over $100,000 compared to 12.1% nationally. The employment status of those at least 15 was 138 (48.4%) full-time, 57 (20.0%) part-time, and 6 (2.1%) unemployed.

=== Ohoka statistical area ===
Ohoka statistical area partly surrounds Mandeville North on the northwest, northeast and southeast. It covers 34.04 km^{2} (13.14 sq mi) and had an estimated population of 1,750 as of June 2025, with a population density of 51 people per km^{2}.

Historical population for the statistical area
Year	Pop.	±% p.a.
2013	1,467	—
2018	1,602	+1.78%
2023	1,671	+0.85%

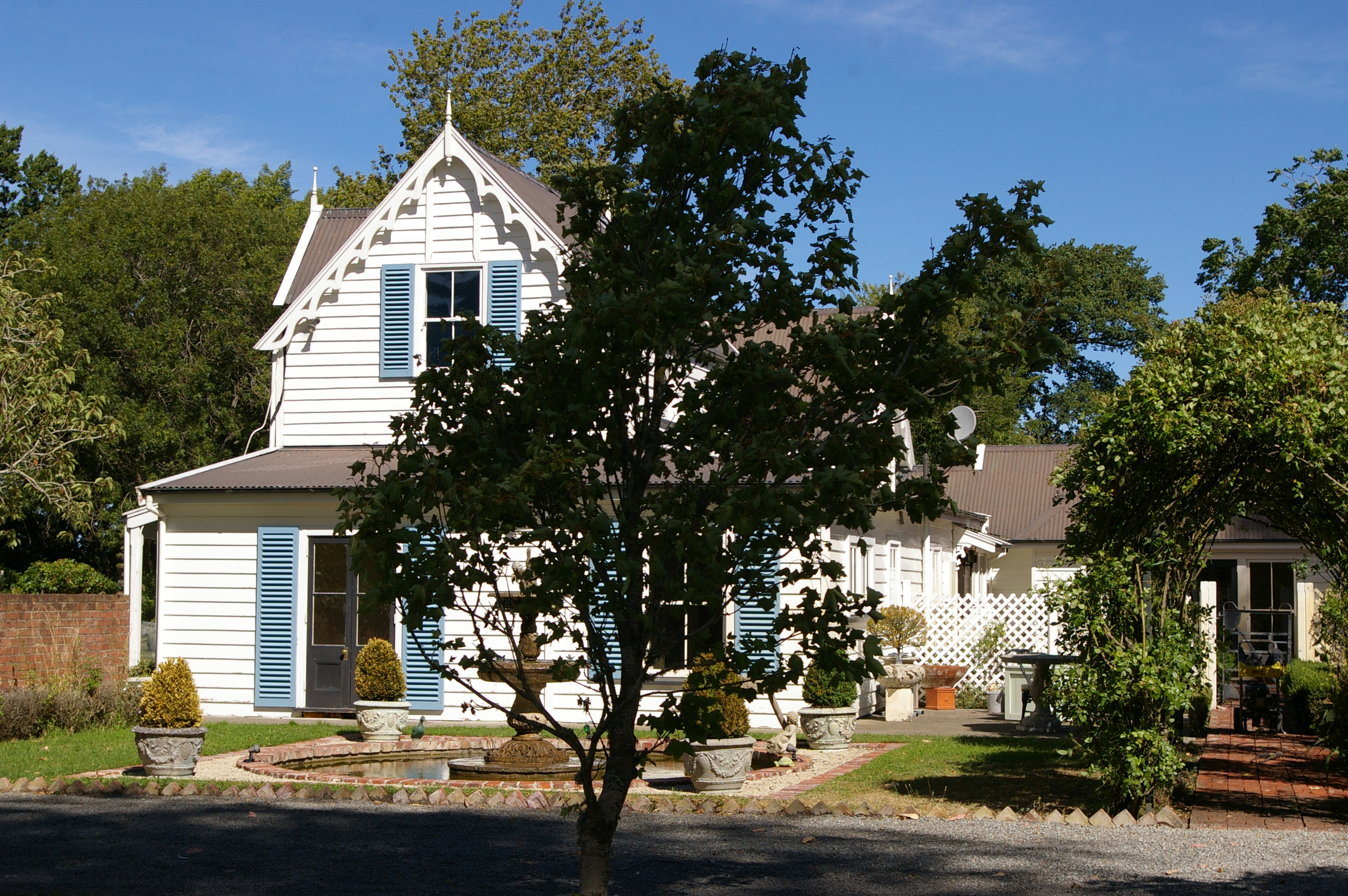
Inglewood Homestead, Threlkelds Road, Ohoka

Ohoka statistical area had a population of 1,671 in the 2023 New Zealand census, an increase of 69 people (4.3%) since the 2018 census, and an increase of 204 people (13.9%) since the 2013 census. There were 843 males, 819 females, and 9 people of other genders in 561 dwellings. 2.3% of people identified as LGBTIQ+. The median age was 46.1 years (compared with 38.1 years nationally). There were 321 people (19.2%) aged under 15 years, 240 (14.4%) aged 15 to 29, 822 (49.2%) aged 30 to 64, and 291 (17.4%) aged 65 or older.

People could identify as more than one ethnicity. The results were 94.8% European (Pākehā); 6.3% Māori; 0.9% Pasifika; 2.7% Asian; 0.9% Middle Eastern, Latin American and African New Zealanders (MELAA); and 2.2% other, which includes people giving their ethnicity as "New Zealander". English was spoken by 98.4%, Māori by 1.1%, Samoan by 0.2%, and other languages by 7.2%. No language could be spoken by 1.3% (e.g. too young to talk). New Zealand Sign Language was known by 0.4%. The percentage of people born overseas was 19.0, compared with 28.8% nationally.

Religious affiliations were 35.9% Christian, 0.2% Hindu, 0.2% Islam, 0.2% Buddhist, 0.2% New Age, and 1.3% other religions. People who answered that they had no religion were 54.8%, and 7.5% of people did not answer the census question.

Of those at least 15 years old, 348 (25.8%) people had a bachelor's or higher degree, 780 (57.8%) had a post-high school certificate or diploma, and 219 (16.2%) people exclusively held high school qualifications. The median income was $48,300, compared with $41,500 nationally. 276 people (20.4%) earned over $100,000 compared to 12.1% nationally. The employment status of those at least 15 was 723 (53.6%) full-time, 252 (18.7%) part-time, and 15 (1.1%) unemployed.

== Education ==
Ōhoka School is Ohoka's only school. It is a state co-educational full primary school with a decile rating of 10 and a roll of 220 students (as of July 2026). It opened in 1868 as Flaxton Side School, with a predecessor "temporary school" from 1862 for a few children of settlers. A building on the present school site was used for older students from about 1873. In 1877, the Flaxton Side School closed and a new school built on the current site called Flaxton Main School. It burned down in 1926. The buildings that replaced it are part of the present school.
