= Ashley, New Zealand =

Settlement in Canterbury, New Zealand

Ashley
- Town
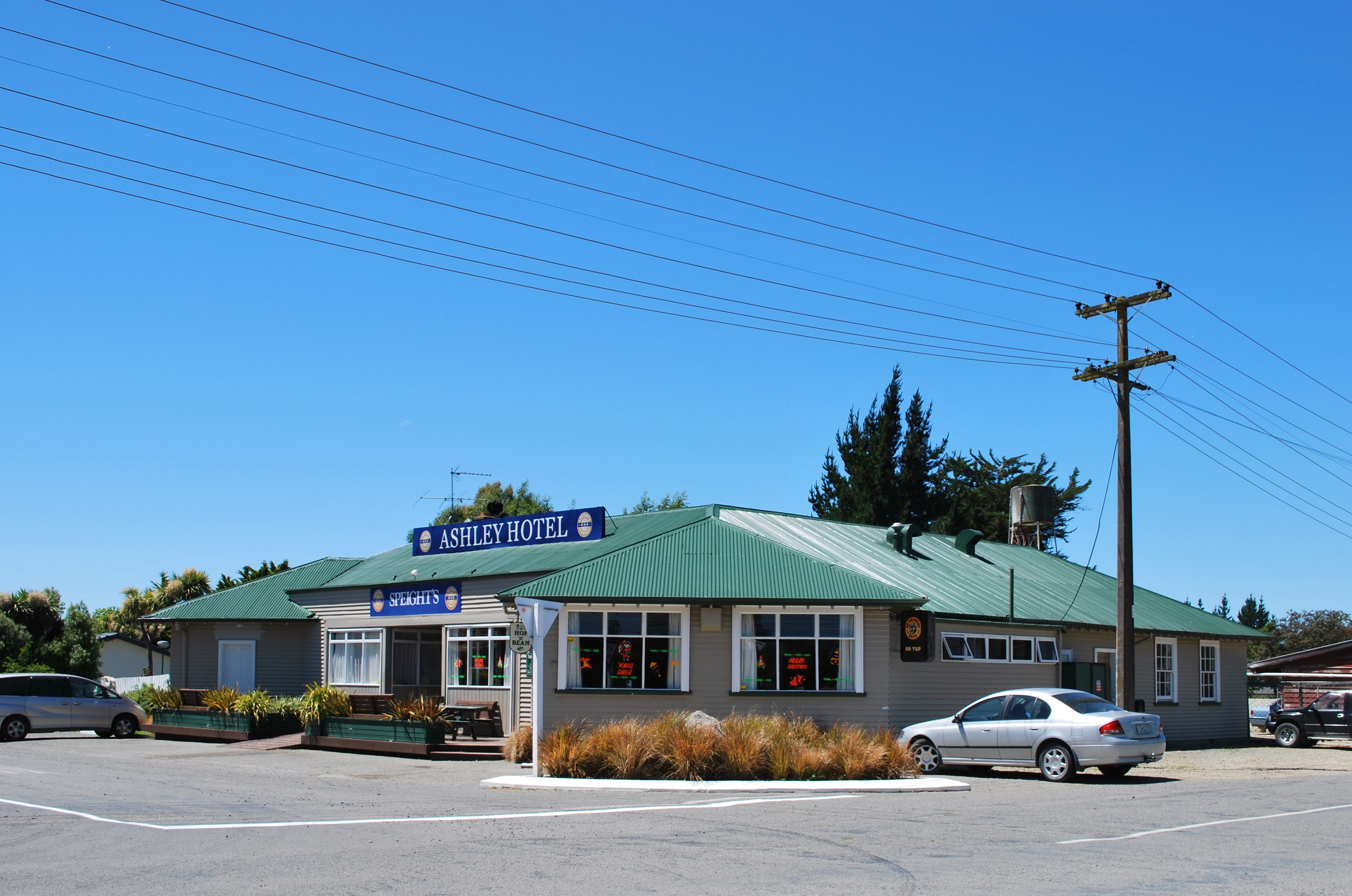
- Ashley Hotel
- Interactive map of Ashley
- Coordinates: 43.276028°S 172.599248°E
- Country: New Zealand
- Region: Canterbury
- Territorial authority: Waimakariri District
- Ward: Rangiora-Ashley Ward
- Community: Rangiora-Ashley Community
- Electorates: Kaikōura; Te Tai Tonga (Māori)

Government
  - Territorial Authority: Waimakariri District Council
  - Regional council: Environment Canterbury
  - Mayor of Waimakariri: Dan Gordon
  - Kaikōura MP: Stuart Smith
  - Te Tai Tonga MP: Tākuta Ferris

Area
  - Total: 0.99 km^{2} (0.38 sq mi)

Population (June 2025)
  - Total: 410
  - Density: 410/km^{2} (1,100/sq mi)
- Time zone: UTC+12 (NZST)
  - Summer (DST): UTC+13 (NZDT)
- Postcode: 7477 and 7473
- Area code: 03
- Local iwi: Ngāi Tahu

Ashley is a small town in North Canterbury, in the South Island of New Zealand. It used to have a railway station on the Main North Line that runs through the village.

== Education ==
Ashley Rakahuri School is Ashley's only school, and was established in 1864. It is a state co-educational full primary, with 184 students (as of July 2026). The principal is Linda Horne.

== Demographics ==
Ashley is described by Stats NZ as a rural settlement and covers 0.99 km^{2} (0.38 sq mi). It had an estimated population of 410 as of June 2025, with a population density of 414 people per km^{2}. Ashley is part of the larger Ashley-Sefton statistical area.

Historical population for Ashley
Year	Pop.	±% p.a.
1901	202	—
2006	222	+0.09%
2013	324	+5.55%
2018	366	+2.47%
2023	393	+1.43%
The 2006 population is for a larger area of 4.66 km^{2}. The 1901 population may be for different boundaries. Source:

Ashley had a population of 393 in the 2023 New Zealand census, an increase of 27 people (7.4%) since the 2018 census, and an increase of 69 people (21.3%) since the 2013 census. There were 189 males and 204 females in 144 dwellings. 1.5% of people identified as LGBTIQ+. The median age was 43.3 years (compared with 38.1 years nationally). There were 75 people (19.1%) aged under 15 years, 66 (16.8%) aged 15 to 29, 186 (47.3%) aged 30 to 64, and 66 (16.8%) aged 65 or older.

People could identify as more than one ethnicity. The results were 95.4% European (Pākehā); 6.9% Māori; 0.8% Pasifika; 2.3% Asian; 0.8% Middle Eastern, Latin American and African New Zealanders (MELAA); and 1.5% other, which includes people giving their ethnicity as "New Zealander". English was spoken by 97.7%, Māori by 1.5%, and other languages by 4.6%. No language could be spoken by 2.3% (e.g. too young to talk). New Zealand Sign Language was known by 0.8%. The percentage of people born overseas was 13.0, compared with 28.8% nationally.

Religious affiliations were 23.7% Christian, 0.8% New Age, and 0.8% other religions. People who answered that they had no religion were 67.9%, and 6.9% of people did not answer the census question.

Of those at least 15 years old, 45 (14.2%) people had a bachelor's or higher degree, 192 (60.4%) had a post-high school certificate or diploma, and 72 (22.6%) people exclusively held high school qualifications. The median income was $41,500, compared with $41,500 nationally. 24 people (7.5%) earned over $100,000 compared to 12.1% nationally. The employment status of those at least 15 was 162 (50.9%) full-time, 45 (14.2%) part-time, and 3 (0.9%) unemployed.

=== Ashley-Sefton statistical area ===
Ashley-Sefton statistical area, which also includes Sefton, covers 86.91 km^{2} (33.56 sq mi). It had an estimated population of 2,560 as of June 2025, with a population density of 29.5 people per km^{2}.

Historical population for Ashley-Sefton
Year	Pop.	±% p.a.
2006	1,710	—
2013	1,953	+1.92%
2018	2,139	+1.84%
2023	2,439	+2.66%

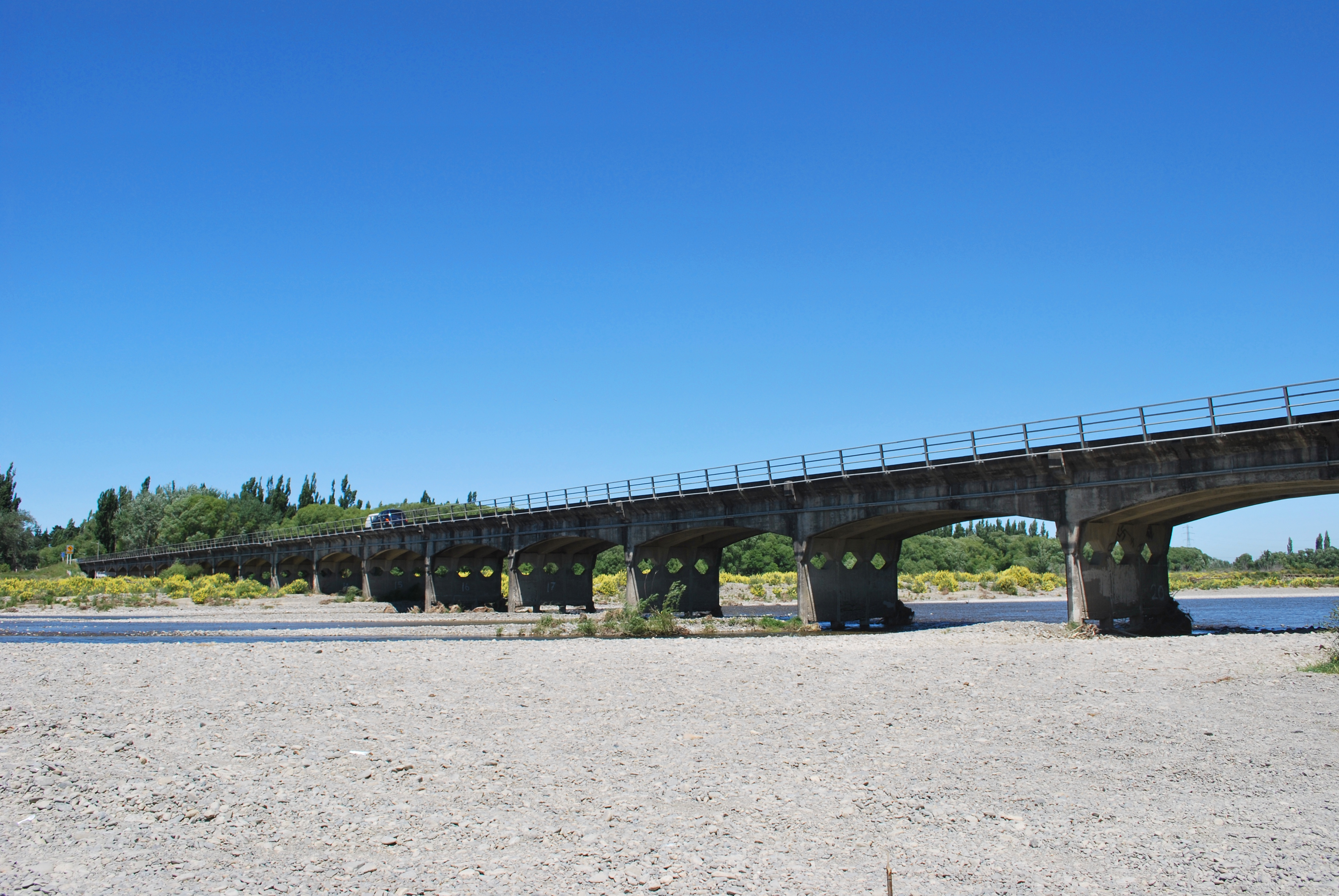
Ashley River bridge

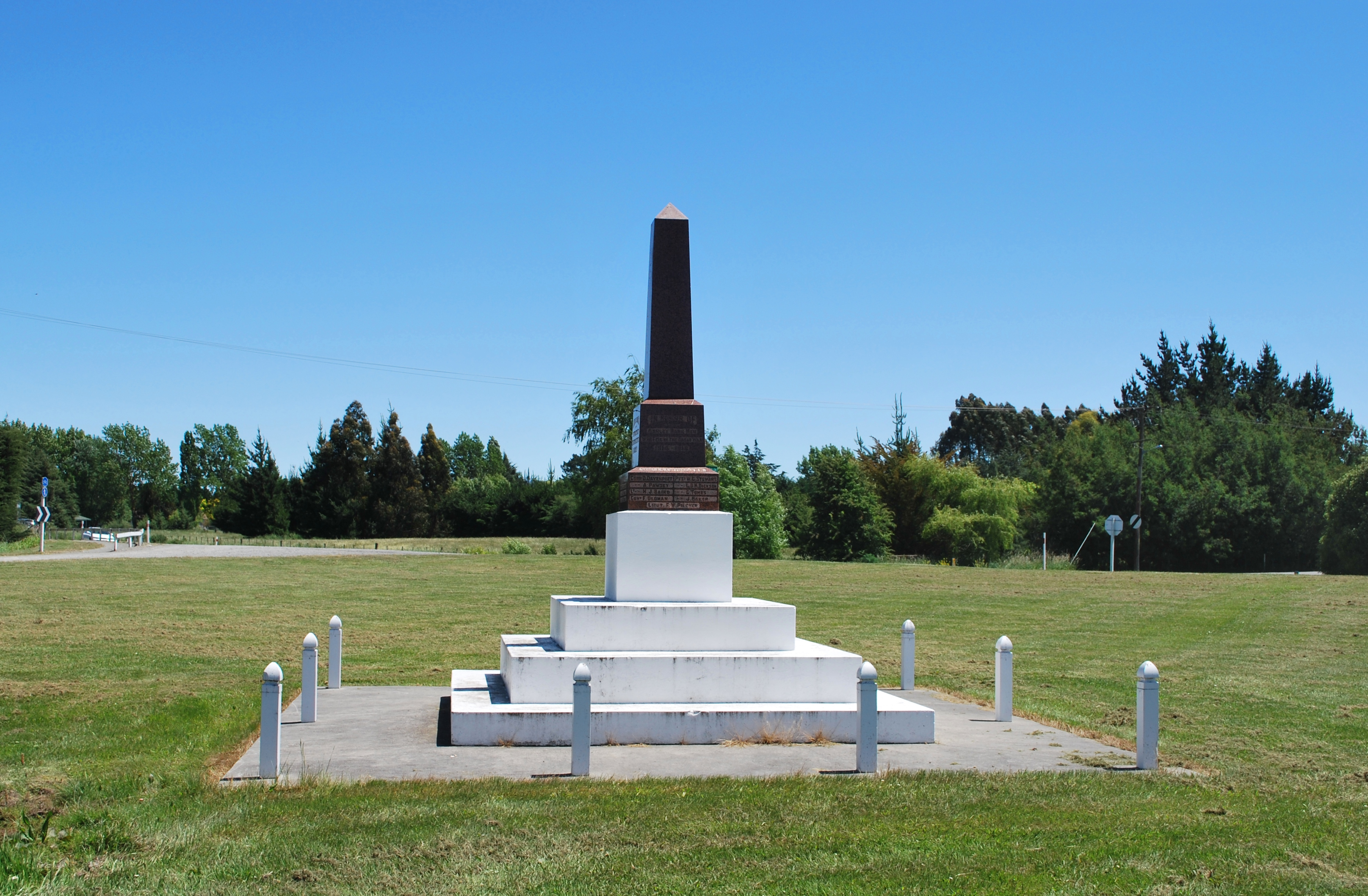
Ashley war memorial

Ashley-Sefton had a population of 2,439 in the 2023 New Zealand census, an increase of 300 people (14.0%) since the 2018 census, and an increase of 486 people (24.9%) since the 2013 census. There were 1,251 males, 1,185 females, and 6 people of other genders in 864 dwellings. 3.0% of people identified as LGBTIQ+. The median age was 44.7 years (compared with 38.1 years nationally). There were 474 people (19.4%) aged under 15 years, 348 (14.3%) aged 15 to 29, 1,176 (48.2%) aged 30 to 64, and 441 (18.1%) aged 65 or older.

People could identify as more than one ethnicity. The results were 94.5% European (Pākehā); 8.2% Māori; 0.7% Pasifika; 2.2% Asian; 0.5% Middle Eastern, Latin American and African New Zealanders (MELAA); and 3.7% other, which includes people giving their ethnicity as "New Zealander". English was spoken by 97.8%, Māori by 1.5%, and other languages by 4.8%. No language could be spoken by 2.0% (e.g. too young to talk). New Zealand Sign Language was known by 0.2%. The percentage of people born overseas was 13.2, compared with 28.8% nationally.

Religious affiliations were 25.6% Christian, 0.1% Islam, 0.2% New Age, and 0.7% other religions. People who answered that they had no religion were 64.8%, and 8.5% of people did not answer the census question.

Of those at least 15 years old, 345 (17.6%) people had a bachelor's or higher degree, 1,167 (59.4%) had a post-high school certificate or diploma, and 453 (23.1%) people exclusively held high school qualifications. The median income was $43,100, compared with $41,500 nationally. 243 people (12.4%) earned over $100,000 compared to 12.1% nationally. The employment status of those at least 15 was 1,038 (52.8%) full-time, 348 (17.7%) part-time, and 39 (2.0%) unemployed.

== Climate ==
The average temperature in summer is 15.9 °C, and in winter is 7 °C.

Month	Normal temperature
January	16.4 °C
February	16.1 °C
March	14.9 °C
April	12.4 °C
May	9.4 °C
June	7.0 °C
July	6.5 °C
August	7.4 °C
September	9.4 °C
October	11.5 °C
November	13.2 °C
December	15.1 °C
