= Fernside, New Zealand =

Rural area in Canterbury, New Zealand

Fernside
- Rural Area
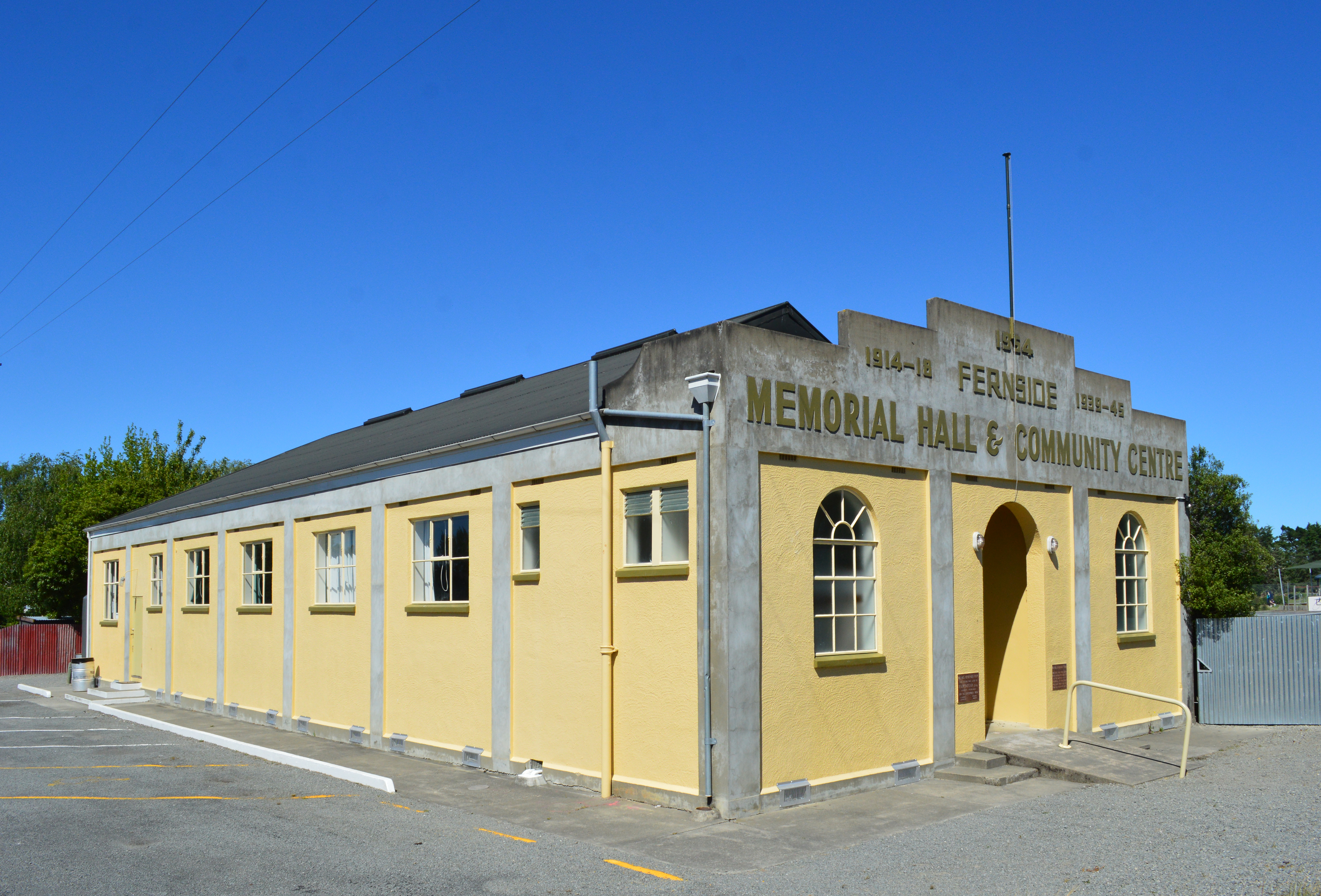
- Memorial hall and community centre
- Interactive map of Fernside
- Coordinates: 43.31°S 172.54°E
- Country: New Zealand
- Region: Canterbury
- Territorial authority: Waimakariri District
- Ward: Rangiora-Ashley Ward
- Community: Rangiora-Ashley Community
- Electorates: Waimakariri; Te Tai Tonga (Māori)

Government
  - Territorial Authority: Waimakariri District Council
  - Regional council: Environment Canterbury
  - Mayor of Waimakariri: Dan Gordon
  - Waimakariri MP: Matt Doocey
  - Te Tai Tonga MP: Tākuta Ferris

Area
  - Total: 0.92 km^{2} (0.36 sq mi)

Population (June 2025)
  - Total: 250
  - Density: 270/km^{2} (700/sq mi)
- Time zone: UTC+12 (NZST)
  - Summer (DST): UTC+13 (NZDT)
- Postcode: 7471
- Area code: 03
- Local iwi: Ngāi Tahu

Fernside is a small rural community in the Waimakariri District, New Zealand.

== Demographics ==
Fernside is described by Stats NZ as a rural settlement, which covers 0.92 km^{2} (0.36 sq mi) and had an estimated population of 250 as of June 2025, with a population density of 272 people per km^{2}. Fernside settlement is part of the larger Fernside statistical area.

Historical population for Fernside settlement
Year	Pop.	±% p.a.
2006	213	—
2013	222	+0.59%
2018	234	+1.06%
2023	240	+0.51%

Fernside had a population of 240 in the 2023 New Zealand census, an increase of 6 people (2.6%) since the 2018 census, and an increase of 18 people (8.1%) since the 2013 census. There were 108 males, 129 females, and 3 people of other genders in 81 dwellings. 2.5% of people identified as LGBTIQ+. The median age was 46.6 years (compared with 38.1 years nationally). There were 48 people (20.0%) aged under 15 years, 36 (15.0%) aged 15 to 29, 111 (46.2%) aged 30 to 64, and 42 (17.5%) aged 65 or older.

People could identify as more than one ethnicity. The results were 93.8% European (Pākehā), 10.0% Māori, 2.5% Asian, and 5.0% other, which includes people giving their ethnicity as "New Zealander". English was spoken by 97.5%, Māori by 1.2%, and other languages by 3.8%. No language could be spoken by 1.2% (e.g. too young to talk). The percentage of people born overseas was 11.2, compared with 28.8% nationally.

Religious affiliations were 26.2% Christian. People who answered that they had no religion were 61.2%, and 12.5% of people did not answer the census question.

Of those at least 15 years old, 42 (21.9%) people had a bachelor's or higher degree, 114 (59.4%) had a post-high school certificate or diploma, and 33 (17.2%) people exclusively held high school qualifications. The median income was $45,200, compared with $41,500 nationally. 36 people (18.8%) earned over $100,000 compared to 12.1% nationally. The employment status of those at least 15 was 81 (42.2%) full-time, 39 (20.3%) part-time, and 3 (1.6%) unemployed.

=== Fernside statistical area ===
Fernside statistical area covers 39.03 km^{2} (15.07 sq mi) and had an estimated population of 1,450 as of June 2025, with a population density of 37 people per km^{2}.

Historical population for Fernside statistical area
Year	Pop.	±% p.a.
1901	550	—
2006	936	+0.51%
2013	1,161	+3.13%
2018	1,269	+1.79%
2023	1,374	+1.60%
The 2006 population is for a larger area of 41.48 km^{2}. The 1901 population may be for different boundaries. Source:

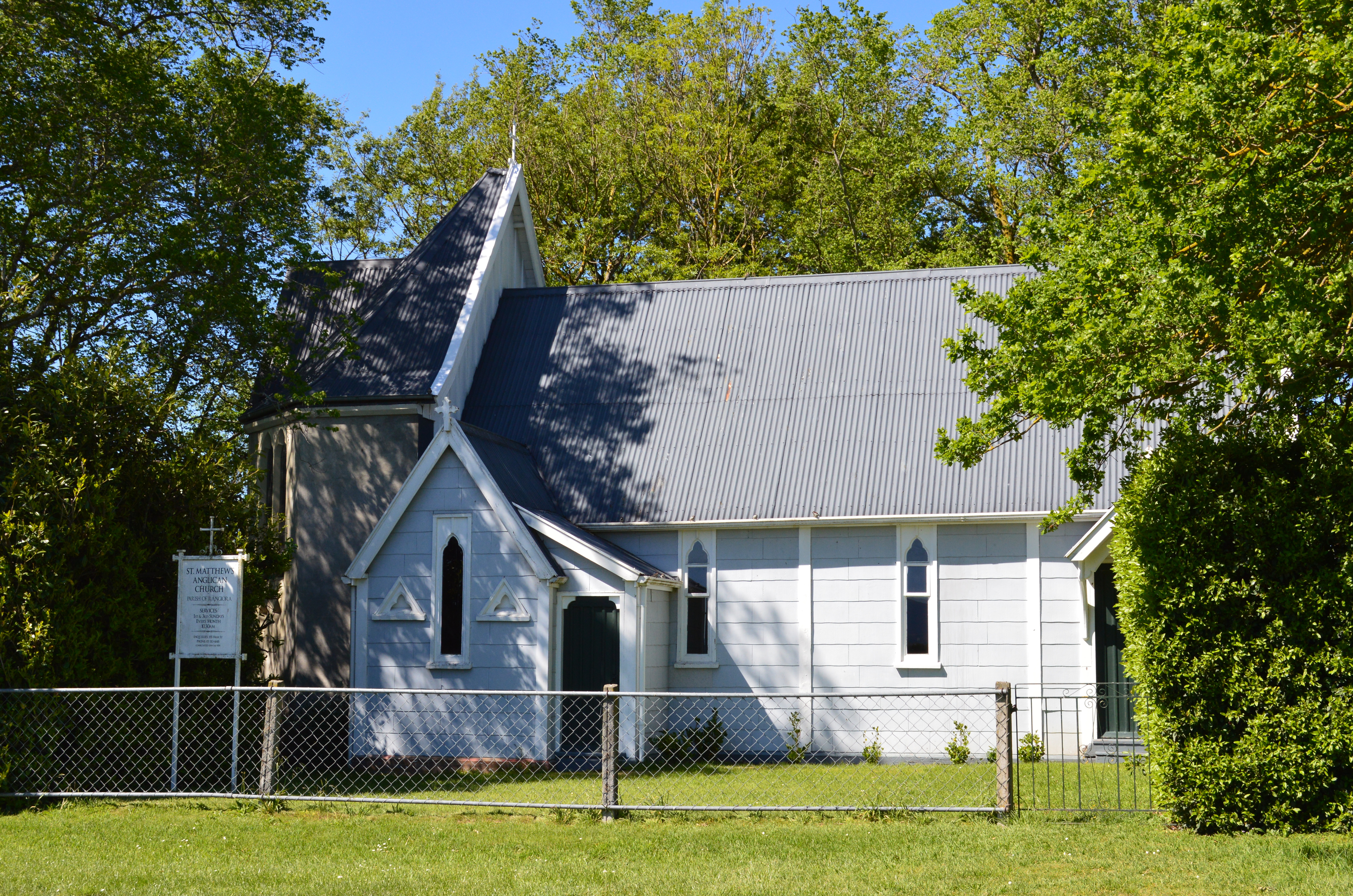
Fernside Anglican church

The statistical area had a population of 1,374 in the 2023 New Zealand census, an increase of 105 people (8.3%) since the 2018 census, and an increase of 213 people (18.3%) since the 2013 census. There were 666 males, 705 females, and 3 people of other genders in 465 dwellings. 1.5% of people identified as LGBTIQ+. The median age was 44.8 years (compared with 38.1 years nationally). There were 240 people (17.5%) aged under 15 years, 246 (17.9%) aged 15 to 29, 669 (48.7%) aged 30 to 64, and 219 (15.9%) aged 65 or older.

People could identify as more than one ethnicity. The results were 94.5% European (Pākehā); 10.0% Māori; 0.4% Pasifika; 2.2% Asian; 0.2% Middle Eastern, Latin American and African New Zealanders (MELAA); and 3.1% other, which includes people giving their ethnicity as "New Zealander". English was spoken by 98.9%, Māori by 2.2%, and other languages by 3.7%. No language could be spoken by 1.1% (e.g. too young to talk). New Zealand Sign Language was known by 0.7%. The percentage of people born overseas was 11.8, compared with 28.8% nationally.

Religious affiliations were 30.8% Christian, 0.2% Islam, 0.2% New Age, and 0.7% other religions. People who answered that they had no religion were 58.1%, and 9.8% of people did not answer the census question.

Of those at least 15 years old, 210 (18.5%) people had a bachelor's or higher degree, 732 (64.6%) had a post-high school certificate or diploma, and 189 (16.7%) people exclusively held high school qualifications. The median income was $44,100, compared with $41,500 nationally. 174 people (15.3%) earned over $100,000 compared to 12.1% nationally. The employment status of those at least 15 was 588 (51.9%) full-time, 219 (19.3%) part-time, and 24 (2.1%) unemployed.

== Education ==
Fernside School is Fernside's only school, and was established in 1864. It is a state co-educational full primary, with 261 students (as of July 2026).

== Climate ==
The average temperature in summer is 16.2, and in winter is 6.4.

Month	Normal temperature
January	16.7 °C
February	16.3 °C
March	15.0 °C
April	12.1 °C
May	8.8 °C
June	6.3 °C
July	5.8 °C
August	7.1 °C
September	9.4 °C
October	11.4 °C
November	13.5 °C
December	15.5 °C
