= Flaxton, New Zealand =

Flaxton
- Rural Area
- Interactive map of Flaxton
- Coordinates: 43.35°S 172.63°E
- Country: New Zealand
- Region: Canterbury
- Territorial authority: Waimakariri District
- Electorates: Waimakariri; Te Tai Tonga (Maori electorate)

Area
  - Total: 11.36 km^{2} (4.39 sq mi)

Population (2023 census)
  - Total: 351
  - Density: 30.9/km^{2} (80.0/sq mi)
- Time zone: UTC+12 (NZST)
  - Summer (DST): UTC+13 (NZDT)
- Postcode: 7691
- Area code: 03
- Local iwi: Ngāi Tahu

Flaxton is a small rural community between the towns of Rangiora and Kaiapoi in the Waimakariri District, New Zealand.

== History ==
Flaxton is in the middle of what was once the Rangiora swamp. Plans for the drainage of this swamp (4000 acres) were prepared, and the first two miles of main drain were cut in about 1860. Two years later another two and a half miles were added, and also several branch drains. These drains have had the effect of drying the land, and lowering the level of the ground in places by as much as eight feet.

== Demographics ==
Flaxton locality covers 11.36 km^{2} (4.39 sq mi). It is split between the Tuahiwi and Fernside statistical areas.

Historical population
Year	Pop.	±% p.a.
2006	255	—
2013	312	+2.92%
2018	339	+1.67%
2023	351	+0.70%

Flaxton had a population of 351 in the 2023 New Zealand census, an increase of 12 people (3.5%) since the 2018 census, and an increase of 39 people (12.5%) since the 2013 census. There were 183 males, 174 females, and 3 people of other genders in 123 dwellings. 2.6% of people identified as LGBTIQ+. There were 54 people (15.4%) aged under 15 years, 72 (20.5%) aged 15 to 29, 177 (50.4%) aged 30 to 64, and 51 (14.5%) aged 65 or older.

People could identify as more than one ethnicity. The results were 91.5% European (Pākehā); 11.1% Māori; 2.6% Asian; 0.9% Middle Eastern, Latin American and African New Zealanders (MELAA); and 3.4% other, which includes people giving their ethnicity as "New Zealander". English was spoken by 99.1%, Māori by 3.4%, and other languages by 3.4%. No language could be spoken by 0.9% (e.g. too young to talk). The percentage of people born overseas was 10.3, compared with 28.8% nationally.

Religious affiliations were 25.6% Christian, and 0.9% Islam. People who answered that they had no religion were 65.0%, and 8.5% of people did not answer the census question.

Of those at least 15 years old, 60 (20.2%) people had a bachelor's or higher degree, 195 (65.7%) had a post-high school certificate or diploma, and 54 (18.2%) people exclusively held high school qualifications. 45 people (15.2%) earned over $100,000 compared to 12.1% nationally. The employment status of those at least 15 was 165 (55.6%) full-time, 45 (15.2%) part-time, and 6 (2.0%) unemployed.

== Climate ==
The average temperature in summer is 16.2, and in winter is 6.4.

Month	Normal temperature
January	16.7 °C
February	16.3 °C
March	15.0 °C
April	12.1 °C
May	8.8 °C
June	6.3 °C
July	5.8 °C
August	7.1 °C
September	9.4 °C
October	11.4 °C
November	13.5 °C
December	15.5 °C
