= Burnt Hill, New Zealand =

Burnt Hill
- Rural Area
- Interactive map of Burnt Hill
- Coordinates: 43.372°S 172.147°E
- Country: New Zealand
- Region: Canterbury
- Territorial authority: Waimakariri District
- Electorates: Waimakariri; Te Tai Tonga (Maori electorate)

Area
  - Total: 70.83 km^{2} (27.35 sq mi)

Population (2023 census)
  - Total: 567
  - Density: 8.01/km^{2} (20.7/sq mi)
- Time zone: UTC+12 (NZST)
  - Summer (DST): UTC+13 (NZDT)
- Postcode: 7495
- Area code: 03
- Local iwi: Ngāi Tahu

Burnt Hill is a small rural community in the Waimakariri District, New Zealand. It is named for the small extinct volcano in the township's south-east corner.

== Demographics ==
Burnt Hill locality covers 70.83 km^{2} (27.35 sq mi). It is part of the larger Ashley Gorge statistical area.

Historical population
Year	Pop.	±% p.a.
2006	156	—
2013	423	+15.32%
2018	501	+3.44%
2023	567	+2.51%

Burnt Hill had a population of 567 in the 2023 New Zealand census, an increase of 66 people (13.2%) since the 2018 census, and an increase of 144 people (34.0%) since the 2013 census. There were 270 males and 306 females in 207 dwellings. 2.1% of people identified as LGBTIQ+. There were 111 people (19.6%) aged under 15 years, 93 (16.4%) aged 15 to 29, 291 (51.3%) aged 30 to 64, and 72 (12.7%) aged 65 or older.

People could identify as more than one ethnicity. The results were 93.1% European (Pākehā); 7.4% Māori; 0.5% Pasifika; 4.2% Asian; 1.1% Middle Eastern, Latin American and African New Zealanders (MELAA); and 3.2% other, which includes people giving their ethnicity as "New Zealander". English was spoken by 97.4%, Māori by 1.1%, and other languages by 6.9%. No language could be spoken by 2.1% (e.g. too young to talk). The percentage of people born overseas was 22.2, compared with 28.8% nationally.

Religious affiliations were 25.9% Christian, 0.5% Buddhist, and 1.6% other religions. People who answered that they had no religion were 63.0%, and 7.9% of people did not answer the census question.

Of those at least 15 years old, 90 (19.7%) people had a bachelor's or higher degree, 273 (59.9%) had a post-high school certificate or diploma, and 93 (20.4%) people exclusively held high school qualifications. 51 people (11.2%) earned over $100,000 compared to 12.1% nationally. The employment status of those at least 15 was 258 (56.6%) full-time and 75 (16.4%) part-time.

== Climate ==
The average temperature in summer is 16.2 °C, and in winter is 5.9 °C.

Month	Normal temperature
January	16.8 °C
February	16.3 °C
March	14.6 °C
April	11.6 °C
May	8.3 °C
June	5.8 °C
July	5.3 °C
August	6.5 °C
September	8.9 °C
October	11.2 °C
November	13.3 °C
December	15.5 °C
