= Ashley Gorge =

River Gorge and rural locality in New Zealand

Coordinates: 43°13′41.95″S 172°13′45.24″E

The Ashley Gorge is a river gorge of the Ashley River / Rakahuri in Canterbury, New Zealand. The river is bridged at the mouth of the gorge by the Inland Scenic Route, formerly designated State Highway 72. A popular picnic ground and camping area is adjacent to the bridge. Upstream of the gorge the river flows through the Lees Valley.

Ashley Gorge is also the name of a small rural locality 2.5 km southwest of the bridge.

== Demographics ==
The Ashley Gorge statistical area, which also includes Burnt Hill and Coopers Creek, covers 336.41 km^{2} (129.89 sq mi). It had an estimated population of 1,400 as of June 2025, with a population density of 4.16 people per km^{2}.

Historical population
Year	Pop.	±% p.a.
2006	690	—
2013	1,002	+5.47%
2018	1,134	+2.51%
2023	1,311	+2.94%

Ashley Gorge had a population of 1,311 in the 2023 New Zealand census, an increase of 177 people (15.6%) since the 2018 census, and an increase of 309 people (30.8%) since the 2013 census. There were 642 males and 663 females in 480 dwellings. 2.3% of people identified as LGBTIQ+. The median age was 41.1 years (compared with 38.1 years nationally). There were 243 people (18.5%) aged under 15 years, 213 (16.2%) aged 15 to 29, 666 (50.8%) aged 30 to 64, and 189 (14.4%) aged 65 or older.

People could identify as more than one ethnicity. The results were 92.9% European (Pākehā); 7.8% Māori; 2.1% Pasifika; 3.4% Asian; 1.1% Middle Eastern, Latin American and African New Zealanders (MELAA); and 2.7% other, which includes people giving their ethnicity as "New Zealander". English was spoken by 97.7%, Māori by 0.9%, Samoan by 0.2%, and other languages by 7.1%. No language could be spoken by 1.6% (e.g. too young to talk). The percentage of people born overseas was 21.1, compared with 28.8% nationally.

Religious affiliations were 29.7% Christian, 0.2% Buddhist, 0.7% New Age, and 1.8% other religions. People who answered that they had no religion were 57.9%, and 9.6% of people did not answer the census question.

Of those at least 15 years old, 210 (19.7%) people had a bachelor's or higher degree, 618 (57.9%) had a post-high school certificate or diploma, and 234 (21.9%) people exclusively held high school qualifications. The median income was $40,100, compared with $41,500 nationally. 108 people (10.1%) earned over $100,000 compared to 12.1% nationally. The employment status of those at least 15 was 573 (53.7%) full-time, 183 (17.1%) part-time, and 12 (1.1%) unemployed.
