= Coopers Creek, New Zealand =

Rural area in Canterbury, New Zealand

Coopers Creek
- Rural Area
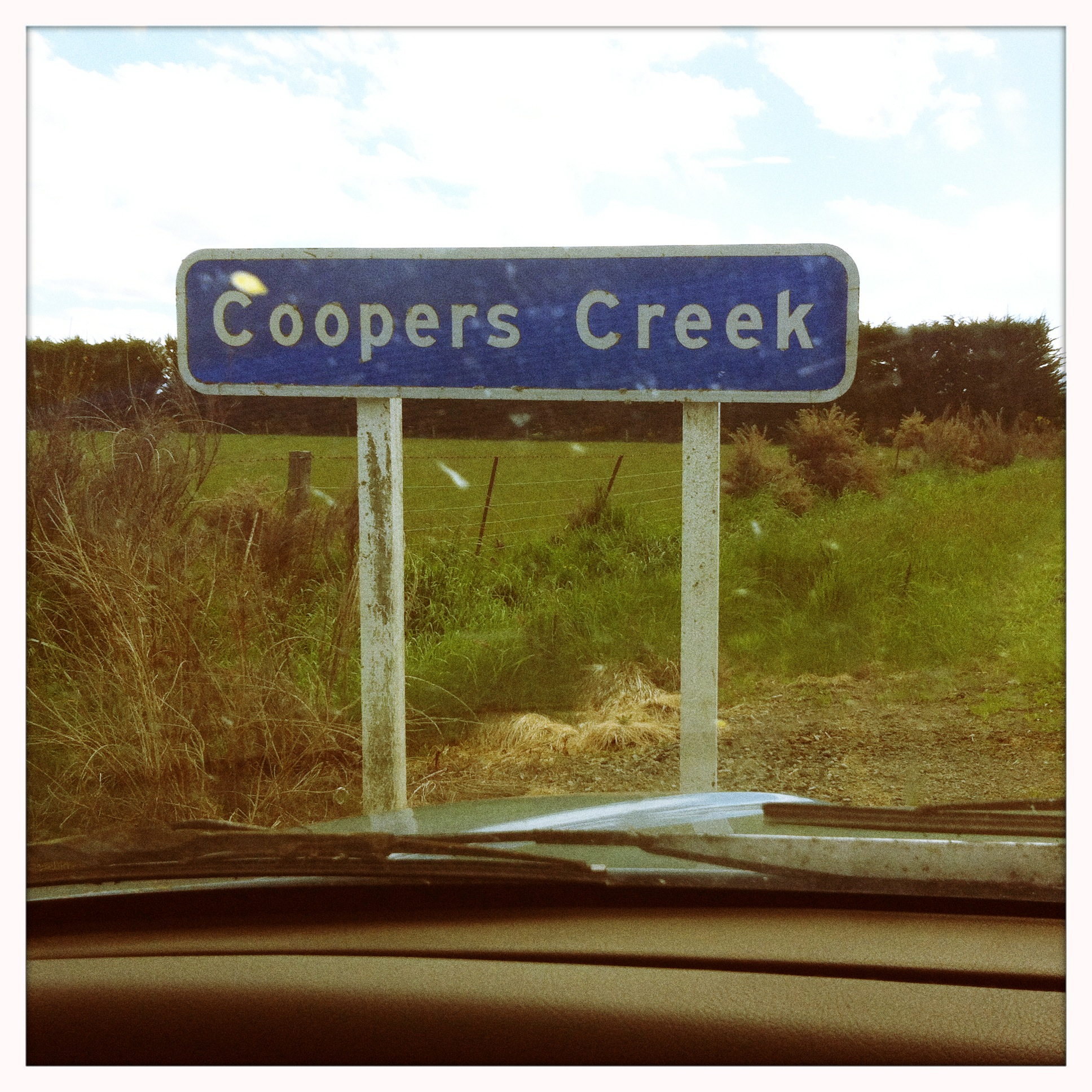
- A sign on the edge of Coopers Creek.
- Interactive map of Coopers Creek
- Coordinates: 43.284764°S 172.107369°E
- Country: New Zealand
- Region: Canterbury
- Territorial authority: Waimakariri District
- Electorates: Waimakariri; Te Tai Tonga (Maori electorate)

Area
  - Total: 50.15 km^{2} (19.36 sq mi)
- Elevation (as at 43.23°S 172.118°E): 955 m (3,133 ft)

Population (2023 census)
  - Total: 255
  - Density: 5.08/km^{2} (13.2/sq mi)
- Time zone: UTC+12 (NZST)
  - Summer (DST): UTC+13 (NZDT)
- Postcode: 7495
- Area code: 03

Coopers Creek is a small rural community near Oxford in the Waimakariri District, New Zealand. It has only eight roads, and no shops. It has a number of mountains and walking tracks. In 1901, Coopers Creek had a population of 168.

== Demographics ==
Coopers Creek locality covers 50.15 km^{2} (19.36 sq mi). It is part of the larger Ashley Gorge statistical area.

Historical population
Year	Pop.	±% p.a.
2013	201	—
2018	222	+2.01%
2023	255	+2.81%

Coopers Creek had a population of 255 in the 2023 New Zealand census, an increase of 33 people (14.9%) since the 2018 census, and an increase of 54 people (26.9%) since the 2013 census. There were 126 males and 129 females in 93 dwellings. 3.5% of people identified as LGBTIQ+. There were 48 people (18.8%) aged under 15 years, 27 (10.6%) aged 15 to 29, 123 (48.2%) aged 30 to 64, and 51 (20.0%) aged 65 or older.

People could identify as more than one ethnicity. The results were 92.9% European (Pākehā); 7.1% Māori; 5.9% Pasifika; 2.4% Asian; 2.4% Middle Eastern, Latin American and African New Zealanders (MELAA); and 2.4% other, which includes people giving their ethnicity as "New Zealander". English was spoken by 100.0%, and other languages by 8.2%. No language could be spoken by 1.2% (e.g. too young to talk). The percentage of people born overseas was 20.0, compared with 28.8% nationally.

Religious affiliations were 36.5% Christian, 3.5% New Age, and 2.4% other religions. People who answered that they had no religion were 45.9%, and 14.1% of people did not answer the census question.

Of those at least 15 years old, 39 (18.8%) people had a bachelor's or higher degree, 108 (52.2%) had a post-high school certificate or diploma, and 60 (29.0%) people exclusively held high school qualifications. 9 people (4.3%) earned over $100,000 compared to 12.1% nationally. The employment status of those at least 15 was 87 (42.0%) full-time, 36 (17.4%) part-time, and 3 (1.4%) unemployed.

== Climate ==
The average temperature in summer is 16.2 °C, and in winter is 5.9 °C.

Month	Normal temperature
January	16.8 °C
February	16.3 °C
March	14.6 °C
April	11.6 °C
May	8.3 °C
June	5.8 °C
July	5.3 °C
August	6.5 °C
September	8.9 °C
October	11.2 °C
November	13.3 °C
December	15.5 °C
