= Glentui =

- Rural Area
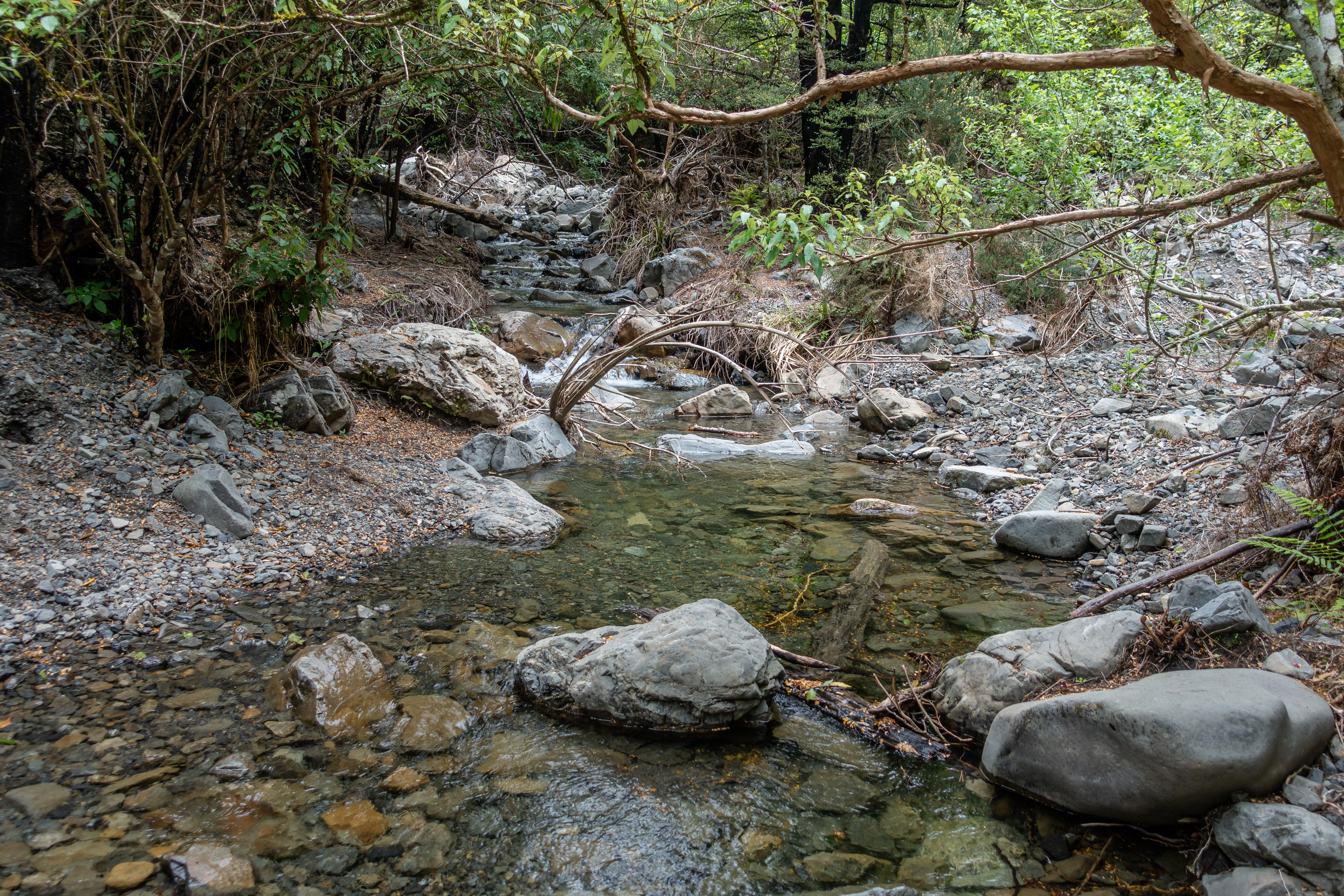
- Glentui River
- Interactive map of Glentui
- Coordinates: 43.22°S 172.24°E
- Country: New Zealand
- Region: Canterbury
- Territorial authority: Waimakariri District
- Ward: Oxford-Ohoka Ward
- Electorates: Kaikoura; Te Tai Tonga (Maori electorate)
- Time zone: UTC+12 (NZST)
  - Summer (DST): UTC+13 (NZDT)
- Postcode: 7495
- Area code: 03

Glentui is a small rural community in the Waimakariri District, New Zealand. It is well known for Glentui Lodge, a facility frequently used by youth groups and schools for camping.

Close to Gentui was Birch Hill Station, a sheep station that was taken up by Theophilus Samuel Mannering in the nineteenth century. George Edward Mannering, who would later become an mountaineer, was born here in 1862.

== Demographics ==
Glentui is part of the wider Okuku statistical area.

== Climate ==
The average temperature in summer is 16.2 °C, and in winter is 5.9 °C.

Climate data for Glentui, New Zealand
Month	Jan	Feb	Mar	Apr	May	Jun	Jul	Aug	Sep	Oct	Nov	Dec	Year
Daily mean °C (°F)	16.8 (62.2)	16.3 (61.3)	14.6 (58.3)	11.6 (52.9)	8.3 (46.9)	5.8 (42.4)	5.3 (41.5)	6.5 (43.7)	8.9 (48.0)	11.2 (52.2)	13.3 (55.9)	15.5 (59.9)	11.2 (52.2)
Source: Norwegian Meteorological Institute
