= Mayor of Waimakariri =

Elected official in New Zealand

- Incumbent; Dan Gordon since 2019
- Style: His/Her Worship
- Term length: Three years, renewable
- Inaugural holder: Trevor Inch
- Formation: 1989
- Deputy: Neville Atkinson
- Salary: $146,838
- Website: Official website

The mayor of Waimakariri officiates over the Waimakariri District Council. The mayor is directly elected using a first-past-the-post electoral system. The current mayor is Dan Gordon.

== History ==
Waimakariri District was established as part of the 1989 local government reforms. It was formed from Rangiora District, Kaiapoi Borough, Oxford County, Eyre County (based on Ohoka) and part of Hurunui County – although Rangiora District and Eyre County had already amalgamated earlier that year.

The first mayor, Trevor Inch, had been Mayor of Rangiora since 1986. He died shortly after resigning on health grounds in 1995. He was succeeded by Janice Skurr, who was in office 1995–2001. Skurr died in 2008. Former Member of Parliament Jim Gerard defeated Skurr in 2001 and was re-elected unopposed in 2004. In 2007 he was defeated by Ron Keating who in turn was defeated by David Ayers three years later, in 2010. Dan Gordon then became mayor in 2019, and was re-elected in 2022 and 2025.

== List of mayors ==
Waimakariri has had six mayors since its establishment in 1989.

	Name	Portrait	Term
1	Trevor Inch		1989–1995
2	Janice Skurr		1995–2001
3	Jim Gerard		2001–2007
4	Ron Keating		2007–2010
5	David Ayers		2010–2019
6	Dan Gordon		2019–present
