= Waimakariri District Council =

Coordinates: 43.2061332°S 171.7724323°E

- Brand logo

Type
- Type: Territorial authority of Waimakariri District
- Term limits: None

History
- Established: 6 March 1989; 36 years ago
- Preceded by: Rangiora County Council; Oxford County Council; Kaiapoi Borough Council; Hurunui County Council
- New session started: 17 October 2025

Leadership
- Mayor: Dan Gordon, Ind. since 14 October 2022
- Deputy: Philip Redmond, Ind. since 28 October 2025
- CEO: Jeff Millward since 8 July 2022

Structure
- Seats: 11 (including mayor)
- Political groups: Independent (10); Standing Together (1)
- Length of term: 3 years

Elections
- Voting system: First-past-the-post
- First election: 14 October 1989
- Last election: 11 October 1989
- Next election: 14 October 2028

Meeting place
- 215 High Street, Rangiora

Website
- waimakariri.govt.nz

Waimakariri District Council (abbr. WDC) is the territorial authority for the Waimakariri District of New Zealand. It serves as the district's local government alongside Environment Canterbury as the regional council. The current entity has existed since 1989, prior to which local government in the area was split between four local authorities.

The governing body of the council has 10 councillors and is chaired by the mayor of Waimakariri (currently Dan Gordon since October 2022). There also four community boards.

== History ==
The council was formed in 1989, replacing Eyre County Council (1912–1989) and Kaiapoi County Council (1868–1989).

In 2020, the council had 433 staff, including 63 earning more than $100,000. According to the Taxpayers' Union think tank, residential rates averaged $2,648.

== Governing body ==
=== Mayor ===
One mayor is elected at-large; they chair meetings of the governing body and act as the head of local government in the district.

=== Current composition ===
The current members of the governing body of council are:

Role	Portrait	Name	Affiliation	Ward
Mayor		Dan Gordon	Independent	Elected at-large
Deputy		Philip Redmond	Independent	Kaiapoi-Woodend
Councillor		Tim Bartle	Standing Together for Waimakariri	Kaiapoi-Woodend
Councillor		Brent Cairns	Independent	Kaiapoi-Woodend
Councillor		Shona Powell	Independent	Kaiapoi-Woodend
Councillor		Wendy Doody	Independent	Rangiora-Ashley
Councillor		Jason Goldsworthy	Independent	Rangiora-Ashley
Councillor		Bruce McLaren	Independent	Rangiora-Ashley
Councillor		Joan Ward	Independent	Rangiora-Ashley
Councillor		Niki Mealings	Independent	Oxford-Ohoka
Councillor		Tim Fulton	Independent	Oxford-Ohoka

== Community boards ==
- Rangiora-Ashley Community Board
- Oxford-Ohoka Community Board
- Woodend-Sefton Community Board
- Kaiapoi-Tuahiwi Community Board
