= Ashley Rakahuri Regional Park =

Regional park

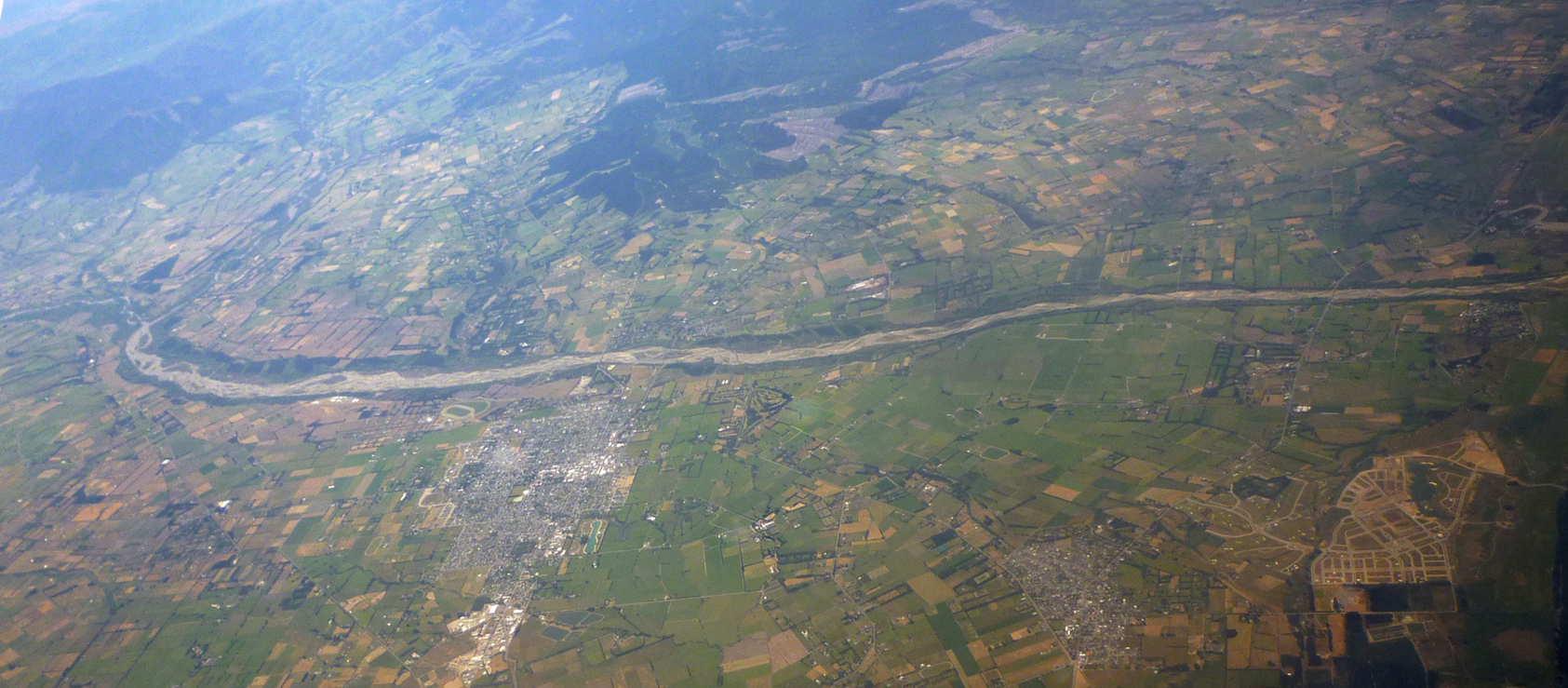
- Aerial photograph of Ashley River / Rakahuri

- Location within South Island
- Interactive map of Ashley Rakahuri Regional Park
- Location: New Zealand
- Coordinates: 43.2816°S 172.5806°E
- Area: 417 hectares (1,030 acres)
- Created: 2012

Ashley Rakahuri Regional Park is a regional park in the Canterbury Region of New Zealand's South Island. It covers 417 hectares (1,030 acres) on the banks of Ashley River / Rakahuri and Okuku River, and is operated by Environment Canterbury. The park is used for fishing, walking, swimming, cycling and family picnics.

== Geography and ecology ==
The regional park an area Ashley River / Rakahuri and Okuku River, including pine forest blocks and mixed stands of exotic trees like willows and poplar. Pockets of native vegetation are gradually being restored.

Ashley River is steeper than other braided rivers in New Zealand, moving large amounts of sediment.

== History ==
Ashley River has a history of flooding. It breached its stopbanks in 1953 next to the Rangiora Traffic Bridge, causing flooding in Rangiora, Kaiapoi, Woodend and Waikuku causing large amounts of damage. River engineering and protection work has been carried out since then to prevent similar flooding events. The land of the Ashley Rakahuri Regional Park was vested in Environment Canterbury to protect that work.

The first areas of the regional park were formally opened on 14 October 2012.

In July 2020, Environment Canterbury felled 500 trees in the reserve without community consultation.

In January 2021, a group of motorcyclists and four-wheel-drivers rode through a colony of nesting black-billed gulls in the park, killing several rare birds.

In June 2021, parts of the park were closed due to flooding.

== Recreation ==
The park has a range of places of fishing, swimming, game-bird hunting, walking, cycling and picnicking.

Dogs are allowed but must be kept under control at all times.

Gas barbecues are allowed away from vegetation, but there are no on-site barbecues and there is a complete ban on fires.

The Mike Kean Walkway connects the State Highway 1 road bridge and the rail bridge.

The Rakahuri Trail, a shared mountain biking and walking track, follows the river downstream from Groyne 1, with shorter single-track mountain bike tracks branch off. The main track is a two-way shared path with loose compact shingle. In October 2017, Rakahuri Trail was extended to Waikuku Beach, doubling its length.

The North Canterbury BMX Club has tracks that can be accessed off Milton Ave.

The most popular access points for the regional park are at the Rangiora/Ashley traffic bridge and State Highway 1 bridge. There are carparks on River Road, the Ashley picnic site, Break Bank, the rail bridge, and the Rakahuri picnic area.
