= Results of the 2022 New Zealand regional council elections =

2022 New Zealand regional council elections
- 8 October 2022
- Turnout: 844,405 (43.09% ▼2.06 pp)
- 11 regional councils
Party	Councils	+/–
No majority	11	0
This lists parties that won seats. See the complete results below.
- 131 regional councillors
Party	Seats	+/–
Independent	120	+2
Green	7	+4
The People's Choice	2	−2
Te Pāti Māori	1	+1
Labour	1	−1
This lists parties that won seats. See the complete results below.

Elections for the regional councils of New Zealand were held on 11 October 2022 as part of that year's nation-wide local elections. 131 regional councillors were elected across all 11 regions.

== Summary ==
=== Councillors and council control ===
Party	Seats	+/-	Councils	+/-
No majority			11	0
Independent	120	▲2		
Green (Note: Includes Green-endorsed Independent)	7	▲4	0	0
The People's Choice	2	▼2	0	0
Te Pāti Māori	1	▲1	0	0
Labour	1	0	0	0
The Common Good	0	▼1	0	0
The Wellington Party	0	▼1	0	0

== Northland Regional Council ==
2022 Northland Regional Council election
- 8 October 2022
- Turnout: 49,181 (42.46%)
- 9 seats on the governing body of Northland Regional Council; 5 seats needed for a majority
Party	Seats	+/–
Independent	8	−1
Independent Green	1	+1
This lists parties that won seats. See the complete results below.
Control before	Control after
No majority	No majority

Chair election
- 25 October 2022

5 of 9 votes needed for majority
	Ind
Candidate	Tui Shortland
Party	Independent Green
Electoral vote	Unopposed
Chair before election
Penny Smart
Independent
Elected Chair
Tui Shortland
Independent Green

=== Far North general constituency ===
2022 Far North general constituency election
Party	Candidate	Votes	%	±%
Independent	Joe Carr	2,585	36.58	(new)
Independent	Marty Yuretich	1,662	23.52	(new)
Independent	Justin Blaikie	1,649	23.33	(new)
Independent	Clyde Samson	475	6.72	(new)
Informal votes		336	4.75	n/a
Blank votes		360	5.09	n/a
Turnout		7,067	45.29	n/a
Registered electors		15,605		
Independent win (new seat)				

=== Bay of Islands-Whangaroa general constituency ===
2022 Bay of Islands-Whangaroa general constituency election
Party	Candidate	Votes	%	±%
Independent	Marty Robinson	2,390	32.64	(new)
Independent	Tania McInnes	2,322	31.71	(new)
Sovereign NZ	Phil Gentry	1,023	13.97	(new)
Independent	Peter Gill	869	11.87	(new)
Informal votes		344	4.70	n/a
Blank votes		375	5.12	n/a
Turnout		7,323	46.20	n/a
Registered electors		15,850		
Independent win (new seat)				

=== Kaipara general constituency ===
2022 Kaipara general constituency election
Party	Candidate	Votes	%	±%
Independent	John Blackwell	3,198	48.43	(new)
Independent	Penny Smart^{†}	2,969	44.96	n/a
Informal votes		53	0.80	n/a
Blank votes		384	5.81	n/a
Turnout		6,604	47.20	n/a
Registered electors		13,991		
Independent gain from Independent				
^{†} incumbent

=== Mid North general constituency ===
2022 Mid North general constituency election
Party	Candidate	Votes	%	±%
Independent	Geoff Crawford	3,087	47.15	(new)
Independent	Lesley Adcock	1,180	18.02	(new)
Independent	William Sullivan	881	13.46	(new)
Independent	John McCaw	766	11.70	(new)
Informal votes		53	0.81	n/a
Blank votes		580	8.86	n/a
Turnout		6,547	45.99	n/a
Registered electors		14,236		
Independent win (new seat)				

=== Coastal Central general constituency ===
2022 Coastal Central general constituency election
Party	Candidate	Votes	%	±%
Independent	Amy Macdonald	4,384	55.55	(new)
Independent	Paul Anthony Dimery	2,352	29.80	(new)
Independent	Christine Woods	662	8.39	(new)
Informal votes		15	0.19	n/a
Blank votes		479	6.07	n/a
Turnout		7,892	51.23	n/a
Registered electors		15,404		
Independent win (new seat)				

=== Coastal South general constituency ===
2022 Coastal South general constituency election
Party	Candidate	Votes	%	±%
Independent	Rick Stolwerk^{†}	elected unopposed		
Registered electors		15,831		
Independent hold				
^{†} incumbent

=== Whangārei Central general constituency ===
2022 Whangārei Central general constituency election
Party	Candidate	Votes	%	±%
Independent	Jack Craw^{†}	4,062	62.14	+8.51
Independent	Tony Savage	1,661	25.41	(new)
Informal votes		6	0.09	−0.04
Blank votes		808	12.36	+4.65
Turnout		6,537	42.02	+2.94
Registered electors		15,556		
Independent hold				
^{†} incumbent

=== Te Raki Māori constituency ===
2022 Te Raki Māori constituency election
Party	Candidate	Votes	%	±%
Independent Green	Tui Shortland	4,922	68.26	(new)
Independent	Peter-Lucas Jones	3,597	49.88	(new)
Independent	Lance Bryers	2,029	28.14	(new)
Independent	Robin Grieve	423	5.87	(new)
Informal votes		127	1.76	n/a
Blank votes		289	4.01	n/a
Turnout		7,211	28.64	n/a
Registered electors		25,174		
Independent Green win (new seat)				
Independent win (new seat)				

=== Chair selection ===
Tui Shortland (Independent Green) was appointed chair unopposed.

== Waikato Regional Council ==
2022 Waikato Regional Council election
- 8 October 2022
- Turnout: 103,420 (38.67%)
- 14 seats on the Waikato Regional Council; 8 seats needed for a majority
Party	Seats	+/–
Independent	14	0
This lists parties that won seats. See the complete results below.

Fourteen councillors were elected to the Waikato Regional Council across six general constituencies and two Māori constituencies.

=== Hamilton general constituency ===
Hamilton general constituency
Affiliation	Candidate	Votes	%
Independent	Angela Strange	18,155	59.71
Independent	Bruce Clarkson	14,864	48.89
Independent	Jennifer Nickel	13,937	45.84
Independent	Chris Hughes	13,282	43.68
Independent	Russ Rimmington	12,716	41.82
Independent	Meshweyla MacDonald	11,054	36.35
Informal		205	0.67
Blank		1,528	5.03
Turnout		30,406	31.37
Registered		96,936	
Independent hold			
Independent gain from Independent			
Independent hold			
Independent gain from Independent			

=== Taupō‐Rotorua general constituency ===
Taupō‐Rotorua general constituency
Affiliation	Candidate	Votes	%
Independent	Mich'eal Downard	6,319	49.67
Independent	Simone Stevenson	4,079	32.06
Independent	Peter Kidd	584	4.59
Informal		13	0.10
Blank		1,728	13.58
Turnout		12,723	50.40
Registered		25,242	
Independent gain from Independent			

=== Thames‐Coromandel general constituency ===
Thames-Coromandel general constituency
Affiliation	Candidate	Votes	%
Independent	Warren Maher	6,979	45.87
Independent	Denis Tegg	6,542	43.00
Informal		5	0.03
Blank		1,689	11.10
Turnout		15,215	50.24
Registered		30,284	
Independent gain from Independent			

=== Waihou general constituency ===
Waihou general constituency
Affiliation	Candidate	Votes	%
Independent	Ben Dunbar-Smith	7,957	85.04
Independent	Robert Cookson	6,596	70.49
Independent	Philip Sherwood	5,943	63.51
Independent	Anita Goodman	3,532	37.75
Independent	Anaru Adams	2,585	27.63
Independent	Chris van der Aa	2,303	24.61
Independent	David Waine	2,303	24.61
Independent	Justus Katzur	1,082	11.56
Informal		166	1.77
Blank		2,008	21.46
Turnout		9,357	44.60
Registered		20,979	
Independent gain from Independent			
Independent gain from Independent			

=== Waikato general constituency ===
Waikato general constituency
Affiliation	Candidate	Votes	%
Independent	Noel Smith	7,389	47.34
Independent	Pamela Storey	7,315	46.86
Independent	Fred Lichtwark	5,994	38.40
Independent	Jennifer Hayman	4,272	27.37
Informal		7	0.04
Blank		1,053	6.75
Turnout		15,610	33.24
Registered		46,968	
Independent gain from Independent			
Independent hold			

=== Waipa-King Country general constituency ===
Waipa-King Country general constituency
Affiliation	Candidate	Votes	%
Independent	Stu Kneebone	10,332	51.60
Independent	Clyde Graf	8,467	42.28
Independent	Judy Sherriff	7,438	37.15
Independent	Barry Quayle	5,905	29.49
Informal		82	0.41
Blank		1,280	6.39
Turnout		20,024	42.58
Registered		47,031	
Independent hold			
Independent gain from Independent			

=== Ngā Hau e Whā Māori constituency ===
Ngā Hau e Whā Māori constituency
Affiliation	Candidate	Votes
Independent	Tipa Mahuta	Unopposed
Registered		20,621
Independent hold		

=== Ngā Tai ki Uta Māori constituency ===
Ngā Tai ki Uta Māori constituency
Affiliation	Candidate	Votes
Independent	Kataraina Hodge	Unopposed
Registered		14,843
Independent hold		

=== Chair selection ===
Pamela Storey and Stu Kneebone were deadlocked for the position of chair 7-to-7; a coin toss decided in Storey's favour.

== Bay of Plenty Regional Council ==
2022 Bay of Plenty Regional Council election
- 8 October 2022
- Turnout: 77,924 (36.63%)
- 14 seats on the Bay of Plenty Regional Council; 8 seats needed for a majority
Party	Seats	+/–
Independent	12	−2
Te Pāti Māori	1	+1
Independent Green	1	+1
This lists parties that won seats. See the complete results below.

Fourteen councillors were elected to the Bay of Plenty Regional Council across four general constituencies and three Māori constituencies.

=== Eastern Bay of Plenty general constituency ===
Eastern Bay of Plenty general constituency
Affiliation	Candidate	Votes	%
Independent	Malcolm Campbell	7,651	63.87
Independent	Doug Leeder	5,716	47.72
Independent	Sarah Jane van der Boom	4,358	36.38
Independent	Russell Orr	2,961	24.72
Independent	Mawera Karetai	2,382	19.88
Informal		18	0.15
Blank		569	4.75
Turnout		11,979	53.91
Registered		22,219	
Independent win (new constituency)			
Independent win (new constituency)			

=== Rotorua general constituency ===
Rotorua general constituency
Affiliation	Candidate	Votes	%
Independent	Kevin Winters	7,102	38.35
Independent	Lyall Thurston	6,612	35.70
Independent	Tim Smith	5,286	28.54
Residents & Ratepayers	Mark Gould	5,190	28.03
Independent	Katie Priscilla Paul	3,719	20.08
Independent Green	Radhika Dahya	2,817	15.21
Informal		27	0.15
Blank		1,139	6.15
Turnout		18,519	52.78
Registered		35,085	
Independent hold			
Independent hold			

=== Tauranga general constituency ===
Tauranga general constituency
Affiliation	Candidate	Votes	%
Independent	Stuart Crosby	12,316	44.97
Independent	Ron Scott	10,983	40.11
Independent	Paula Thompson	10,029	36.62
Independent	Andrew von Dadelszen	9,050	33.05
Independent Green	Kat MacMillan	8,834	32.26
Independent	Mark Wassung	8,539	31.18
Independent	David Love	7,848	28.66
Independent	Murray Guy	7,342	26.81
Independent	Matt Cooney	6,825	24.92
Independent	Jason Nicholls-Faitele	6,198	22.63
Independent	Phil Ross	6,022	21.99
Independent	Jos Nagels	5,465	19.96
Independent	Larry Baldock	4,628	16.90
Independent	Murray White	4,529	16.54
Independent	Mark Fogerty	3,567	13.03
Independent	Stephen Wheeler	1,734	6.33
Independent	Bryan Deuchar	1,718	6.27
Informal		60	0.22
Blank		37	0.14
Turnout		27,385	28.45
Registered		96,244	
Independent hold			
Independent gain from Independent			
Independent hold			
Independent hold			
Independent Green gain from Independent			

=== Western Bay of Plenty general constituency ===
Western Bay of Plenty general constituency
Affiliation	Candidate	Votes	%
Independent	Jane Nees	8,264	59.93
Independent	Ken Shirley	6,380	46.27
Independent	Sean Newland	4,217	30.58
Independent	Julian Fitter	3,290	23.86
Informal		18	0.13
Blank		1,087	7.88
Turnout		13,789	38.75
Registered		35,586	
Independent hold			
Independent gain from Independent			

=== Māuao Māori constituency ===
Māuao Māori constituency
Affiliation	Candidate	Votes	%
Independent	Matemoana McDonald	1,281	56.71
Independent	Buddy Mikaere	901	39.88
Informal		5	0.22
Blank		64	2.83
Turnout		2,259	19.54
Registered		11,560	
Independent hold			

=== Ōkurei Māori constituency ===
Ōkurei Māori constituency
Affiliation	Candidate	Votes	%
Independent	Te Taru White	1,809	45.30
Independent	Raina M Meha	1,791	44.85
Informal		1	0.03
Blank		362	9.07
Turnout		3,993	33.13
Registered		12,051	
Independent hold			

=== Kohi Māori constituency ===
Kohi Māori constituency
Affiliation	Candidate	Votes
Te Pāti Māori	Toi Kai Rākau Iti	Unopposed
Registered		9,980
Te Pāti Māori gain from Independent (incumbent changed affiliation)		

=== Chair selection ===
Two candidates for chair were nominated Doug Leeder and Te Taru White. Leeder was elected by majority of a show of hands.

== Hawke's Bay Regional Council ==
2022 Hawke's Bay Regional Council election
- 8 October 2022
- Turnout: 34,137 (39.16% ▼9.38)
- 11 seats on the Hawke's Bay Regional Council; 6 seats needed for a majority
Party	Seats	+/–
Independent	11	0
This lists parties that won seats. See the complete results below.
Control before	Control after
No majority	No majority

Chair election
- 26 October 2022

6 of 11 votes needed for majority
	Ind
Candidate	Hinewai Orsmby
Party	Independent
Electoral vote	Unopposed
Chair before election
?
Elected Chair
Hinewai Ormsby
Independent

=== Wairoa general constituency ===
2022 Wairoa general constituency election
Party	Candidate	Votes	%	±%
Independent	Di Roadley	1,182	63.82	(new)
Independent	Apiata Tapine	534	28.83	(new)
Informal votes		0	0.00	−0.04
Blank votes		183	9.88	+6.47
Turnout		1,852	57.86	+6.42
Registered electors		3,201		
Independent gain from Independent				

=== Ahuriri/Napier general constituency ===
2022 Ahuriri/Napier general constituency election
Party	Candidate	Votes	%	±%
Independent	Neil Kirton^{†}	12,261	69.46	+17.79
Independent	Martin Williams^{†}	11,446	64.84	+18.81
Independent	Hinewai Ormsby^{†}	9,323	52.82	−0.02
Independent	Mark Barham	6,362	36.04	(new)
Informal votes		5	0.03	−0.76
Blank votes		651	3.69	−1.57
Turnout		17,652	42.70	−8.06
Registered electors		41,344		
Independent hold				
Independent hold				
Independent hold				
^{†} incumbent

=== Heretaunga/Hastings general constituency ===
2022 Heretaunga/Hastings general constituency election
Party	Candidate	Votes	%	±%
Independent	Jock Mackintosh	7,604	59.74	(new)
Independent	Sophie Siers	7,132	56.03	(new)
Independent	Xan Harding	5,921	46.52	(new)
Independent	Craig Foss^{†}	5,491	43.14	+5.56
Independent	Steve Gibson	4,381	34.42	(new)
Informal votes		18	0.14	−0.18
Blank votes		487	3.83	−0.83
Turnout		12,729	36.21	−6.90
Registered electors		35,149		
Independent gain from Independent				
Independent gain from Independent				
Independent gain from Independent				
^{†} incumbent

=== Ngaruroro general constituency ===
2022 Ngaruroro general constituency election
Party	Candidate	Votes	%	±%
Independent	Jerf van Beek^{†}	elected unopposed		
Registered electors		14,505		
Independent hold				
^{†} incumbent

=== Tamatea/Central Hawke's Bay general constituency ===
2022 Tamatea/Central Hawke's Bay general constituency election
Party	Candidate	Votes	%	±%
Independent	Will Foley^{†}	elected unopposed		
Registered electors		10,695		
Independent hold				
^{†} incumbent

=== Māui ki te Raki Māori constituency ===
2022 Māui ki te Raki Māori constituency election
Party	Candidate	Votes	%	±%
Independent	Charles Lambert	988	51.89	(new)
Independent	Michelle McIlroy	789	41.44	(new)
Informal votes		2	0.11	n/a
Blank votes		162	8.51	n/a
Turnout		1,904	25.43	n/a
Registered electors		7,486		
Independent win (new seat)				

=== Māui ki te Tonga Māori constituency ===
2022 Māui ki te Tonga Māori constitutency election
Party	Candidate	Votes	%	±%
Independent	Thompson Hokianga	elected unopposed		
Registered electors		9,060		
Independent win (new seat)				

=== Chair selection ===
Hinewai Ormsby was the sole nominee and was thus elected unopposed to the chair position.

== Taranaki Regional Council ==
2022 Taranaki Regional Council election
- 8 October 2022
- Turnout: 35,564 (44.55%)
- 11 seats on the Taranaki Regional Council; 6 seats needed for a majority
Party	Seats	+/–
Independent	11	0
This lists parties that won seats. See the complete results below.

Eleven councillors were elected to the Taranaki Regional Council across four general constituencies and one Māori constituency.

=== New Plymouth general constituency ===
New Plymouth general constituency
Affiliation	Candidate	Votes	%
Independent	Susan Hughes	10,537	52.63
Independent	Charlotte Littlewood	10,239	51.14
Independent	Tom Cloke	10,012	50.00
Independent	Craig Williamson	8,188	40.90
Independent	David Lloyd Lean	8,121	40.56
Independent	Elvisa van der Leden	6,025	30.09
Independent	Allen Juffermans	5,619	28.06
Independent	Rusty Kane	3,403	17.00
Independent	Chris Wilkes	3,194	15.95
Independent	Lyall James Field	2,848	14.22
Independent	Darrel Nicholas	2,402	12.00
Informal		265	1.32
Blank		1,450	7.24
Turnout		20,022	46.79
Registered		42,794	
Independent gain from Independent			
Independent hold			
Independent hold			
Independent hold			
Independent hold			

=== North Taranaki general constituency ===
North Taranaki general constituency
Affiliation	Candidate	Votes	%
Independent	Mike Davey	4,137	65.69
Independent	Donald Hugh McIntyre	3,422	54.33
Independent	Tama Blackburn	2,166	34.39
Informal		125	1.98
Blank		418	6.64
Turnout		6,298	44.86
Registered		14,038	
Independent hold			
Independent hold			

=== Stratford general constituency ===
Stratford general constituency
Affiliation	Candidate	Votes	%
Independent	Alan Jamieson	741	30.02
Independent	Mary Bourke	623	25.24
Independent	Matthew McDonald	582	23.58
Independent	Andrew Wood	463	18.76
Informal		9	0.36
Blank		50	2.03
Turnout		2,468	38.2
Registered		6,461	
Independent gain from Independent			

=== South Taranaki general constituency ===
South Taranaki general constituency
Affiliation	Candidate	Votes	%
Independent	Neil William Walker	3,354	49.50
Independent	Donna Cram	2,873	42.40
Independent	Alan Murray	2,476	36.54
Independent	Deborah Clough	1,944	28.69
Independent	Urs Signer	1,030	15.20
Informal		40	0.59
Blank		287	4.24
Turnout		6,776	40.97
Registered		16,540	
Independent hold			
Independent gain from Independent			

=== Taranaki Māori constituency ===
Taranaki Māori general constituency
Affiliation	Candidate	Votes
Independent	Bonita Bigham	Unopposed
Registered		7,097
Independent win (new constituency)		

=== Chair selection ===
Charlotte Littlewood was the sole nominee and was thus elected unopposed to the chair position.

== Horizons Regional Council ==
2022 Horizons Regional Council election
- 8 October 2022
- Turnout: 66,541 (43.47%)
- 14 seats on the Horizons Regional Council; 8 seats needed for a majority
Party	Seats	+/–
Independent	13	+2
Independent Green	1	0
This lists parties that won seats. See the complete results below.

Fourteen councillors were elected to the Horizons Regional Council (also known as Manawatū-Whanganui Regional Council) across six general constituencies and two Māori constituencies.

=== Horowhenua general constituency ===
Horowhenua general constituency
Affiliation	Candidate	Votes	%
Independent	Emma Clarke	6,853	62.46
Independent Green	Sam Ferguson	6,261	57.06
Independent	Donald Hayes	4,071	37.10
Informal		2	0.02
Blank		754	6.87
Turnout		10,972	48.10
Registered		22,811	
Independent hold			
Independent Green hold			

=== Manawatū-Rangitīkei general constituency ===
Manawatū-Rangitīkei general constituency
Affiliation	Candidate	Votes	%
Independent	Bruce Gordon	6,154	42.94
Independent	Gordon McKellar	6,114	42.66
Independent	Peter Wells	5,414	37.78
Independent	Paul Bayly	3,795	26.48
Independent	Don Ravine	2,273	15.86
Informal		110	0.77
Blank		1,095	7.64
Turnout		14,331	47.33
Registered		30,276	
Independent hold			
Independent gain from Independent			

=== Palmerston North general constituency ===
Palmerston North general constituency
Affiliation	Candidate	Votes	%
Independent	Jono Naylor	13,345	62.56
Independent	Rachel Keedwell	13,148	61.64
Independent	Fiona Gordon	10,844	50.83
Independent	Wiremu Kingi Te Awe Awe	9,606	45.03
Independent	Bal Ghimire	5,300	24.85
Informal		264	1.24
Blank		1,209	1.24
Turnout		21,332	38.56
Registered		55,327	
Independent hold			
Independent hold			
Independent hold			
Independent hold			

=== Ruapehu general constituency ===
Ruapehu general constituency
Affiliation	Candidate	Votes	%
Independent	Nikki Riley	1,707	48.60
Independent	Gail Gray	1,206	34.34
Informal		60	1.71
Blank		515	14.66
Turnout		3,512	53.10
Registered		6,614	
Independent gain from Independent			

=== Whanganui general constituency ===
Whanganui general constituency
Affiliation	Candidate	Votes	%
Independent	David Cotton	8,613	57.84
Independent	Alan Taylor	7,416	49.80
Independent	Allan Wrigglesworth	6,457	43.36
Informal		10	0.08
Blank		1,360	9.07
Turnout		14,892	50.95
Registered		29,228	
Independent hold			
Independent gain from Independent			

=== Tararua general constituency ===
Tararua general constituency
Affiliation	Candidate	Votes
Independent	Allan Benbow	Unopposed
Registered		11,569
Independent hold		

=== Raki Māori constituency ===
Raki Māori constituency
Affiliation	Candidate	Votes
Independent	Turuhia (Jim) Edmonds	Unopposed
Registered		9,694
Independent win (new constituency)		

=== Tonga Māori constituency ===
Tonga Māori constituency
Affiliation	Candidate	Votes	%
Independent	Te Kenehi Teira	1,310	87.22
Independent	Warwick Gernhoefer	400	26.63
Informal		12	0.8
Blank		227	15.11
Turnout		1,502	17.19
Registered		8,739	
Independent win (new constituency)			

=== Chair selection ===
The council was divided between support for Rachel Keedwell and Bruce Gordon for the position of chair. Keedwell won the vote of members 8-to-6.

Council vote on chair selection
Keedwell	Gordon
Rachel Keedwell	Bruce Gordon
Sam Ferguson	Fiona Gordon
Jim Edmonds	David Cotton
Jono Naylor	Allan Benbow
Alan Taylor	Gordon McKellar
Emma Clarke	Nikki Riley
Wiremu Te Awe Awe	
Te Kenei Teira	
8	6

== Greater Wellington Regional Council ==
2022 Greater Wellington Regional Council election
- 8 October 2022
- Turnout: 154,290 (43.41%)
- 13 seats on the Greater Wellington Regional Council; 7 seats needed for a majority
Party	Seats	+/–
Independent	9	0
Green	3	+1
Labour	1	0
This lists parties that won seats. See the complete results below.

Thirteen councillors were elected to the Greater Wellington Regional Council (also known as Wellington Regional Council) across six general constituencies.

=== Poneke/Wellington constituency ===
2022 Greater Wellington Regional Council election: Poneke/Wellington constituency
Affiliation	Candidate	Primary vote	%	Final vote (Note: Rounded to whole number.)
Independent	Simon Woolfe	10,061	14.67	9,804
Green	Yadana Saw	9,734	14.19	9,807
Green	Thomas Nash	9,396	13.70	9,808
Labour	Daran Ponter	7,373	10.75	9,806
Independent	David Lee	5,458	7.96	9,804
Independent	Roger Blakeley	6,375	9.3	9,782
Independent	Glenda Hughes	4,206	6.13	0
Independent	Jake Arthur	4,206	6.13	0
Independent	Chris Calvi-Freeman	3,611	5.27	0
Independent	Chris Montgomerie	1,428	2.08	0
Independent	Thomas Bryan	1,320	1.92	0
Independent	Leigh Catley	1,270	1.85	0
Informal		358	0.52	
Blank		3,888	5.67	
Turnout		68,575	45.89	
Registered		149,422		
Independent gain from The Wellington Party				
Green gain from Independent				
Green hold				
Labour hold				
Independent hold				

=== Te Awa Kairangi ki Tai/Lower Hutt constituency ===
2022 Greater Wellington Regional Council election: Te Awa Kairangi ki Tai/Lower Hutt constituency
Affiliation	Candidate	Primary vote	%	Final vote
Independent	David Bassett	7,119	22.26	7,405
Independent	Ken Laban	7,086	22.16	7,327
Green	Quentin Duthie	6,477	20.26	7,282
Labour	Alex Voutratzis	3,259	10.19	3,639
Independent	Michael Stevenson	2,736	8.56	3,313
Independent	Peggy Luke-Ngaheke	1,514	4.74	0
Independent	Tracey Buick	1,241	3.88	0
Informal		895	2.8	
Blank		1,637	5.12	
Turnout		31,974	40.98	
Registered		78,030		
Independent gain from Independent				
Independent hold				
Green hold				

=== Porirua-Tawa constituency ===
2022 Greater Wellington Regional Council election: Porirua-Tawa constituency
Affiliation	Candidate	Primary vote	%	Final vote
Independent	Chris Kirk-Burnnand	5,527	27.65	5,867
Independent	Hikitia Ropata	3,903	19.53	5,925
Independent	Roger Watkin	4,215	21.09	5,575
Green	Robyn Smith	3,852	19.27	0
Independent	Lynette Itani	1,092	5.46	0
Informal		187	0.94	
Blank		2,204	11.03	
Turnout		19,986	37.89	
Registered		52,749		
Independent gain from Independent				
Independent gain from Independent				

=== Kāpiti Coast constituency ===
2022 Greater Wellington Regional Council election: Kāpiti Coast constituency
Affiliation	Candidate	Vote	%
Independent	Penny Gaylor	10,216	52.46
Independent Green	Asher Wilson-Goldman	7,824	40.18
Informal		12	0.06
Blank		1,366	7.01
Turnout		19,474	45.58
Registered		42,721	
Independent hold			

=== Wairarapa constituency ===
2022 Greater Wellington Regional Council election: Wairarapa constituency
Affiliation	Candidate	Vote
Independent	Adrienne Staples	Unopposed
Registered		42,721
Independent hold		

=== Te Awa Kairangi ki Uta/Upper Hutt constituency ===
2022 Greater Wellington Regional Council election: Te Awa Kairangi ki Uta/Upper Hutt constituency
Affiliation	Candidate	Vote	%
Independent	Ros Connelly	7,376	51.65
Independent	Steve Taylor	4,321	30.26
Independent	Peter Hayes	1,453.	10.17
Informal		23	0.16
Blank		1,072	7.51
Turnout		14,281	43.93
Registered		32,510	
Independent hold			

=== Chair selection ===
Daran Ponter, a Labour councillor, was elected as chair unopposed.

== West Coast Regional Council ==
2022 West Coast Regional Council election
- 8 October 2022
- Turnout: 12,601 (52.18%)
- 7 seats on the West Coast Regional Council; 4 seats needed for a majority
Party	Seats	+/–
Independent	7	0
This lists parties that won seats. See the complete results below.

Seven councillors were elected to the West Coast Regional Council across three general constituencies.

=== Buller constituency ===
Buller constituency
Affiliation	Candidate	Vote	%
Independent	Frank Dooley	1,769	46.30
Independent	Mark McIntyre	849	22.22
Independent	Dave Hawes	794	20.78
Independent	Paul Reynolds	732	19.16
Independent	Rosco Moore	687	17.98
Independent	Stephen Griffin	678	17.74
Independent	Graham Howard-Mills	489	12.80
Independent	Charlie Bruning	309	8.09
Independent	Kair Lippiatt	285	7.46
Independent	Paul Finlay	173	4.53
Independent	Matt Ambler	89	2.33
Informal		36	0.94
Blank		106	2.77
Turnout		3,821	49.20
Registered		7,767	
Independent gain from Independent			
Independent gain from Independent			

=== Grey constituency ===
Grey constituency
Affiliation	Candidate	Vote	%
Independent	Peter Ewen	3,225	65.14
Independent	Allan John Birchfield	3,168	63.99
Independent	Brett Cummings	3,047	61.54
Independent	Mel Sutherland	1,908	38.54
Informal		1	0.02
Blank		257	5.19
Turnout		4,951	49.32
Registered		10,039	
Independent hold			
Independent hold			
Independent hold			

=== Westland constituency ===
Westland constituency
Affiliation	Candidate	Vote	%
Independent	Andy Campbell	1,603	41.86
Independent	Peter Haddock	1,501	39.20
Independent	Stuart Challenger	1,382	36.09
Independent	Debra Magner	1,315	34.34
Independent	Fritha Templeton	491	12.82
Informal		11	0.29
Blank		167	4.36
Turnout		3,829	60.38
Registered		6,342	
Independent gain from Independent			
Independent gain from Independent			

=== Chair selection ===
Allan Birchfield was elected to the position of chair.

== Environment Canterbury ==
2022 Environment Canterbury election
- 8 October 2022
- Turnout: 202,264 (45.37%)
- 14 seats of Environment Canterbury; 8 seats needed for a majority
Party	Seats	+/–
Independent	12	+3
The People's Choice	2	−2
This lists parties that won seats. See the complete results below.

Fourteen councillors were elected to Environment Canterbury (also known as Canterbury Regional Council) across seven general constituencies.

=== North Canterbury/Ōpukepuke constituency ===
North Canterbury/Ōpukepuke constituency
Affiliation	Candidate	Vote	%
Independent	Claire McKay	13,453	49.28
Independent	Grant Edge	11,577	42.41
Independent	Shaun Lissington	9,222	33.78
Independent	Rachel Vaughan	9,152	33.53
Informal		22	0.08
Blank		3,157	11.57
Turnout		27,297	46.06
Registered		59,265	
Independent hold			
Independent hold			

=== Christchurch West/Ōpuna constituency ===
Christchurch West/Ōpuna constituency
Affiliation	Candidate	Vote	%
The People's Choice	Craig Pauling	13,534	40.55
Independent	Deon Swiggs	11,132	33.36
Independent	John Stringer	10,485	31.42
Independent	Paul Franicevic	8,543	25.6
Independent	Andrea Davis (Murray)	7,456	22.34
Informal		7	0.02
Blank		3,221	9.65
Turnout		33,374	45.74
Registered		72,971	
The People's Choice hold			
Independent gain from Independent			

=== Mid-Canterbury/Ōpakihi constituency ===
Mid-Canterbury/Ōpakihi constituency
Affiliation	Candidate	Vote	%
Independent	Ian MacKenzie	18,760	57.55
Independent	John Sunckell	16,557	50.79
Independent	Peter Trolove	11,624	35.66
Independent	Matt Coffey	6,546	20.08
Informal		117	0.36
Blank		2,171	6.66
Turnout		32,600	45.68
Registered		71,362	
Independent hold			
Independent hold			

=== South Canterbury/Ōtuhituhi constituency ===
South Canterbury/Ōtuhituhi constituency
Affiliation	Candidate	Vote	%
Independent	Nick Ward	10,985	49.20
Independent	Peter Scott	10,574	47.36
Independent	Elizabeth McKenzie	10,166	45.53
Independent	Roy Teweringa Snow	3,805	17.04
Informal		25	0.11
Blank		2,364	10.59
Turnout		22,326	50.32
Registered		44,372	
Independent gain from Independent			
Independent hold			

=== Christchurch North East/Ōrei constituency ===
Christchurch North East/Ōrei constituency
Affiliation	Candidate	Vote	%
Independent	David East	15,512	49.57
The People's Choice – Labour	Joe Davies	9,963	31.84
Independent	Ashley Campbell	8,011	25.60
Independent	Tane Apanui	7,622	24.36
Independent	John Knox	6,515	20.82
Informal		5	0.02
Blank		2,648	8.46
Turnout		31,295	44.36
Registered		70,555	
Independent gain from Independent			
The People's Choice – Labour hold			

=== Christchurch Central/Ōhoko constituency ===
Christchurch Central/Ōhoko constituency
Affiliation	Candidate	Vote	%
Independent	Greg Byrnes	10,871	43.24
Independent	Genevieve Robinson	10,693	42.53
The People's Choice	Brynlea Stocks	9,556	38.01
Independent	Murray Wiig	5,840	23.23
Independent	Lindon Boyce	1,771	7.04
Informal		8	0.03
Blank		2,537	10.09
Turnout		25,142	37.99
Registered		66,188	
Independent gain from The Common Good			
Independent gain from The People's Choice – Labour			

=== Christchurch South/Ōwhanga constituency ===
Christchurch South/Ōwhanga constituency
Affiliation	Candidate	Vote	%
Independent	Vicky Southworth	17,844	59.03
Independent	Paul Dietsche	10,612	35.10
The People's Choice	Chrys Horn	9,535	31.54
Independent	James Macbeth Dann	7,973	26.37
Informal		8	0.03
Blank		2,948	9.75
Turnout		30,230	49.50
Registered		61,070	
Independent hold			
Independent gain from The People's Choice – Labour			

=== Chair selection ===
Councillors Peter Scott and Craig Pauling were nominated for the position. The votes being 7-to-7, a coin toss was held which Scott won and he was thus elected chair.

== Otago Regional Council ==
2022 Otago Regional Council election
- 8 October 2022
- Turnout: 75,251 (48.82%)
- 12 seats of Otago Regional Council; 7 seats needed for a majority
Party	Seats	+/–
Independent	11	0
Green	1	+1
Labour	0	−1
This lists parties that won seats. See the complete results below.

Twelve councillors were elected to the Otago Regional Council across four general constituencies.

=== Dunstan constituency ===
Dunstan constituency
Affiliation	Candidate	Vote	%
Independent	Gary Kelliher	9,885	48.22
Independent	Alexa Forbes	9,874	48.17
Independent	Michael Laws	9,517	46.43
Independent	Tony Lepper	9,496	46.33
Independent	Mike Barker	6,283	30.65
Informal		102	0.5
Blank		1,439	7.02
Turnout		20,498	45.43
Registered		45,116	
Independent hold			
Independent hold			
Independent hold			

=== Moeraki constituency ===
Moeraki constituency
Affiliation	Candidate	Vote
Independent	Kevin Malcolm	Unopposed
Registered		15,220
Independent hold		

=== Molyneux constituency ===
Molyneux constituency
Affiliation	Candidate	Vote	%
Independent	Lloyd McCall	8,487	55.91
Independent	Kate Wilson	6,763	44.55
Independent	Carmen Hope	6,460	42.55
Informal		123	0.81
Blank		2,025	13.34
Turnout		15,181	55.53
Registered		27,339	
Independent gain from Independent			
Independent hold			

=== Dunedin constituency ===
Dunedin constituency
Affiliation	Candidate	Vote	%
Independent	Gretchen Robertson	17,401	43.97
Independent	Bryan Scott	15,172	38.34
Independent	Andrew Noone	15,106	38.17
Independent	Elliot Weir	12,517	31.63
Ōtepoti Green	Alan Somerville	11,235	28.39
Independent	Tim Mepham	11,114	28.09
Independent	Richard Anderson	9,559	24.16
Independent	Malcolm Budd	8,917	22.53
Labour	Bill Southworth	8,722	22.04
Independent	Ross Davies	8,654	21.87
Independent	James Cockle	6,401	16.18
Independent	Mathew Kiore	6,175	15.60
Independent	Watson Pita	5,115	12.93
Independent	Jenn Shulzitski	3,367	8.51
Informal		354	0.89
Blank		4,085	10.32
Turnout		39,572	48.48
Registered		81,628	
Independent hold			
Independent hold			
Independent hold			
Independent gain from Labour			
Ōtepoti Green gain from Independent			
Independent gain from Independent			

=== Chair selection ===
Gretchen Robertson and Kevin Malcolm were nominated for the position of chair. Robertson won the vote of councillors 7-to-5.

== Environment Southland ==
2022 Environment Southland election
- 8 October 2022
- Turnout: 33,232 (51.93%)
- 12 seats of Environment Southland; 7 seats needed for a majority
Party	Seats	+/–
Independent	12	0
This lists parties that won seats. See the complete results below.

Twelve councillors were elected to Environment Southland (also known as Southland Regional Council) across six general constituencies.

=== Fiordland constituency ===
Fiordland constituency
Affiliation	Candidate	Vote	%
Independent	Paul Evans	821	51.03
Independent	Allan Baird	430	26.72
Informal		0	0.00
Blank		125	7.77
Turnout		1,609	56.54
Registered		2,846	
Independent hold			

=== Eastern-Dome constituency ===
Eastern-Dome constituency
Affiliation	Candidate	Vote	%
Independent	Jeremy McPhail	3,856	63.35
Independent	Alastair Gibson	2,554	41.96
Independent	Danny Mitchell	2,180	35.81
Informal		3	0.05
Blank		472	7.75
Turnout		6,087	52.64
Registered		11,564	
Independent hold			
Independent gain from Independent			

=== Hokonui constituency ===
Hokonui constituency
Affiliation	Candidate	Vote	%
Independent	Peter McDonald	1,244	47.79
Independent	Russell Gordon MacPherson	928	35.65
Informal		1	0.04
Blank		195	7.49
Turnout		2,603	47.10
Registered		5,527	
Independent gain from Independent			

=== Southern constituency ===
Southern constituency
Affiliation	Candidate	Vote	%
Independent	Jon Pemberton	1,004	54.59
Independent	Lloyd James McCallum	563	30.61
Informal		0	0.00
Blank		150	8.16
Turnout		1,839	41.29
Registered		4,454	
Independent gain from Independent			

=== Invercargill-Rakiura constituency ===
Invercargill-Rakiura constituency
Affiliation	Candidate	Vote	%
Independent	Eric Roy	10,191	48.31
Independent	Lyndal Ludlow	8,632	40.92
Independent	Maurice Rodway	8,620	40.86
Independent	Neville Cook	8,242	39.07
Independent	Phil Morrison	7,291	34.56
Independent	Robert Guyton	7,054	33.44
Independent	Bruce Pagan	6,995	33.16
Independent	Gemma McGrath	5,489	26.02
Informal		11	0.05
Blank		1,582	7.5
Turnout		21,094	53.26
Registered		39,602	
Independent hold			
Independent hold			
Independent gain from Independent			
Independent hold			
Independent gain from Independent			
Independent hold			

=== Western constituency ===
Western constituency
Affiliation	Candidate	Vote
Independent	Nicol Horrell	Unopposed
Registered		5,297
Independent hold		

=== Chair selection ===
Nicol Horrell was re-elected chair for his third term in the position unopposed.
