= Northern Pegasus Bay =

Regional park in New Zealand

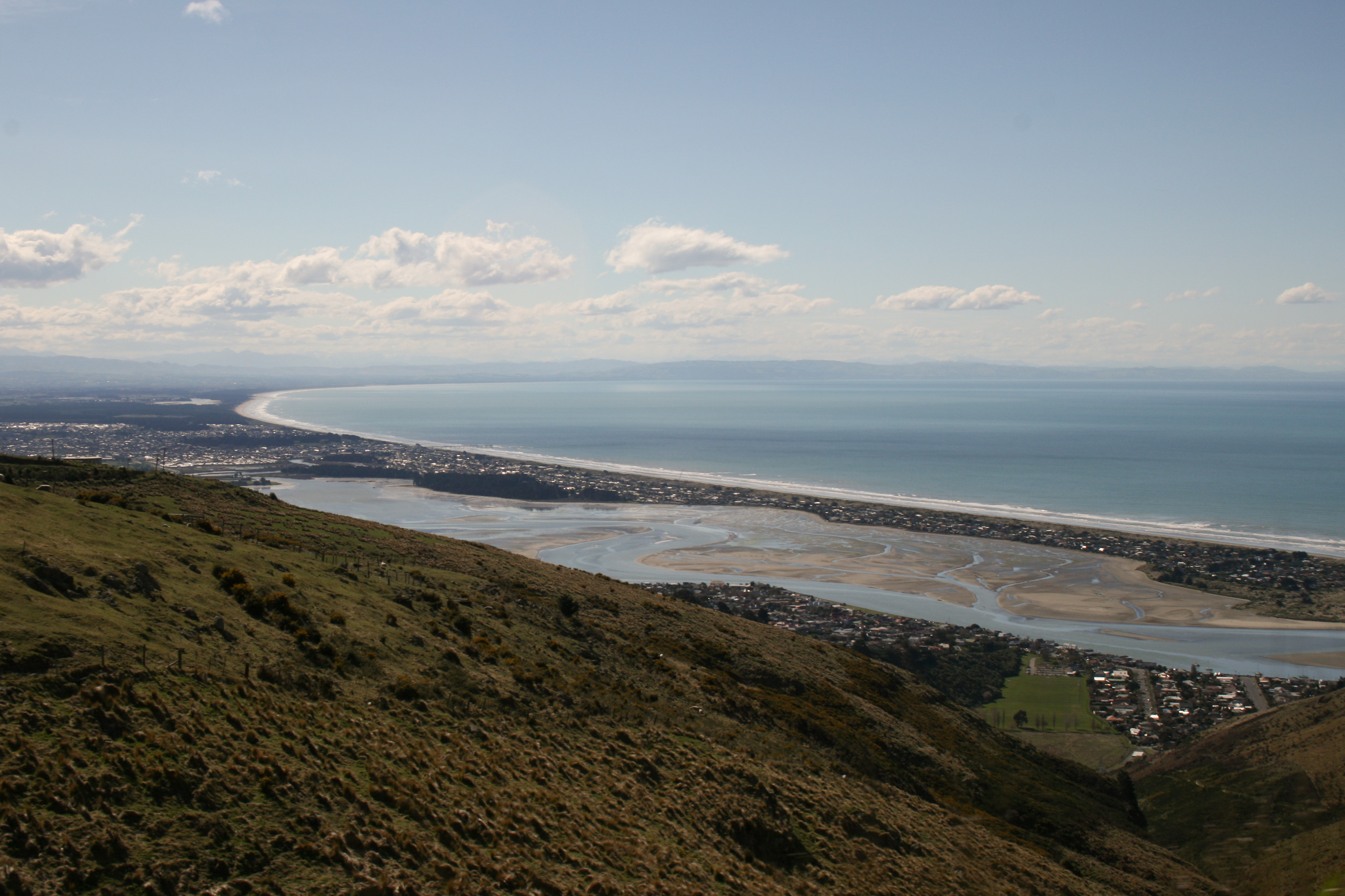
- Pegasus Bay, with Northern Pegasus Bay in the distance

- Location within South Island
- Location: New Zealand
- Coordinates: 43.3259565°S 172.6956407°E

Northern Pegasus Bay is a regional park in the northern part of Canterbury's Pegasus Bay in New Zealand's South Island. It is operated by Environment Canterbury.

The regional park covers an area north of Waimakariri River, including the beaches in Kairaki, The Pines Beach, Woodend, Waikuku, Leithfield, Amberley and Ashley River / Rakahuri estuary.

== Geography and ecology ==
The sandy and pebbly beaches, river mouths, estuaries and dunes provide a range of important habitats.

The Ashley Rakahuri Estuary is major site for birds on the South Island east coast, with colonies of spotted shags / pārekareka and white-fronted terns / kahawai regularly sighted. Other rate native bird species in the reserve include banded dotterels, pied stilts, the endangered wrybill, black billed gulls / tarāpuka and black fronted terns / tarapiroe. There are also seasonal migrations of grey tailed tattlers, whimbrels, eastern curlews, bar tailed godwits and red knots.

== History ==
The mixed sand and gravel beaches of Northern Pegasus Bay have been eroding since the 1980s. This, combined with heavy rainfall, has been affecting tuatua in the bay.

The Waimakariri District Council bylaw governing the park was changed in 2016 to restrict vehicles, horse riders, vehicles and dogs. The changes were aimed at improving public safety, reducing public nuisance and protecting the environment.

The bylaw was further amended the following year to restrict drone usage.

In November 2018, extra enforcement patrols were introduced after four-wheel drivers caused destruction to the beach.

University of Canterbury research, published in November 2020, found vehicles on Northern Pegasus Bay beaches had a significant impact on the environment and other beach users. Dune health had improved after vehicle permits were required.

In January 2021 Environment Canterbury dealt with three breaches of the park bylaw. It also warned people to stop recreational driving on the beach after a vehicle was seen driving at speech down the beachfront at The Pines Beach.

== Recreation ==
=== Beach activities ===
Swimming and surfing are safe at all beaches, except at Kairaki Beach close to the Waimakariri River mouth. A surf club patrols Waikuku, Pegasus Town and Woodend during summer months.

Land sailing is allowed on sea beaches and the Ashley Rakahuri estuary, with some rules in place.

Gas barbecues and picnics are allowed in areas free of vegetation, but fires are not allowed and there are no on-site barbecues.

Use of drones and microlights is restricted to protect sea and marine birds. This includes a ban on using a drone or model aircraft, or taking off or landing a microlight or helicopter, in the Ashley / Rakahuri and Saltwater Creek estauarine areas.

=== Vehicle access ===
Two-wheel motorbikes and recreational driving is banned. Vehicles are only allowed on the beach to transport recreational equipment such as boats, surf boards and fishing gear, and can get caught in changing tides.

=== Fishing ===
Fishing is allowed in a range of places around the reserve. Surfcasting is allowed along beach fronts. Whitebaiting is permitted during the season at river mouths, but a permit is required at the Ashley River mouth. Salmon fishing is possible at several places, particularly at Kairaki Beach.

Offshore kayak fishing and boat fishing is safer in the bay than in the Canterbury Bight due to the lack of strong undertows and longshore rips. The bay is suitable for drag netting of flounder and other fish, particularly just north of Kairaki at the Waimakariri River mouth.

=== Cycling ===
There are several cycling tracks within the reserve. A short track from Amberley Beach to the Waipara River mouth, where a four-wheel-drive track continues on to the Amberley Rocks. Kowai Track runs from the Leithfield Hotel to Leithfield Beach. Tutaepatu Trail connects Waikuku Beach to Woodend Beach, connecting to the Pegasus Trail to Kairaki Beach.

=== Dogs and horses ===
Dogs must be controlled at all times, and are prohibited in the Ashley-Rakahuri estuary area.

Horse riding is permitted along sections of the bay below the high tide line. However, horses are prohibited from the Ashley Rakahuri Estuary, Kowai River mouth, Waipara River mouth, and between the Waikuku Beach horse-float car-park and the north side of the Ashley Rakahuri estuary.

=== Camping ===
There are campgrounds at Kairaki, Woodend, Waikuku, Leithfield and Amberley Beaches, but freedom camping is not permitted on the beaches or shore.
