= Diana Shand =

New Zealand conservationist and local politician

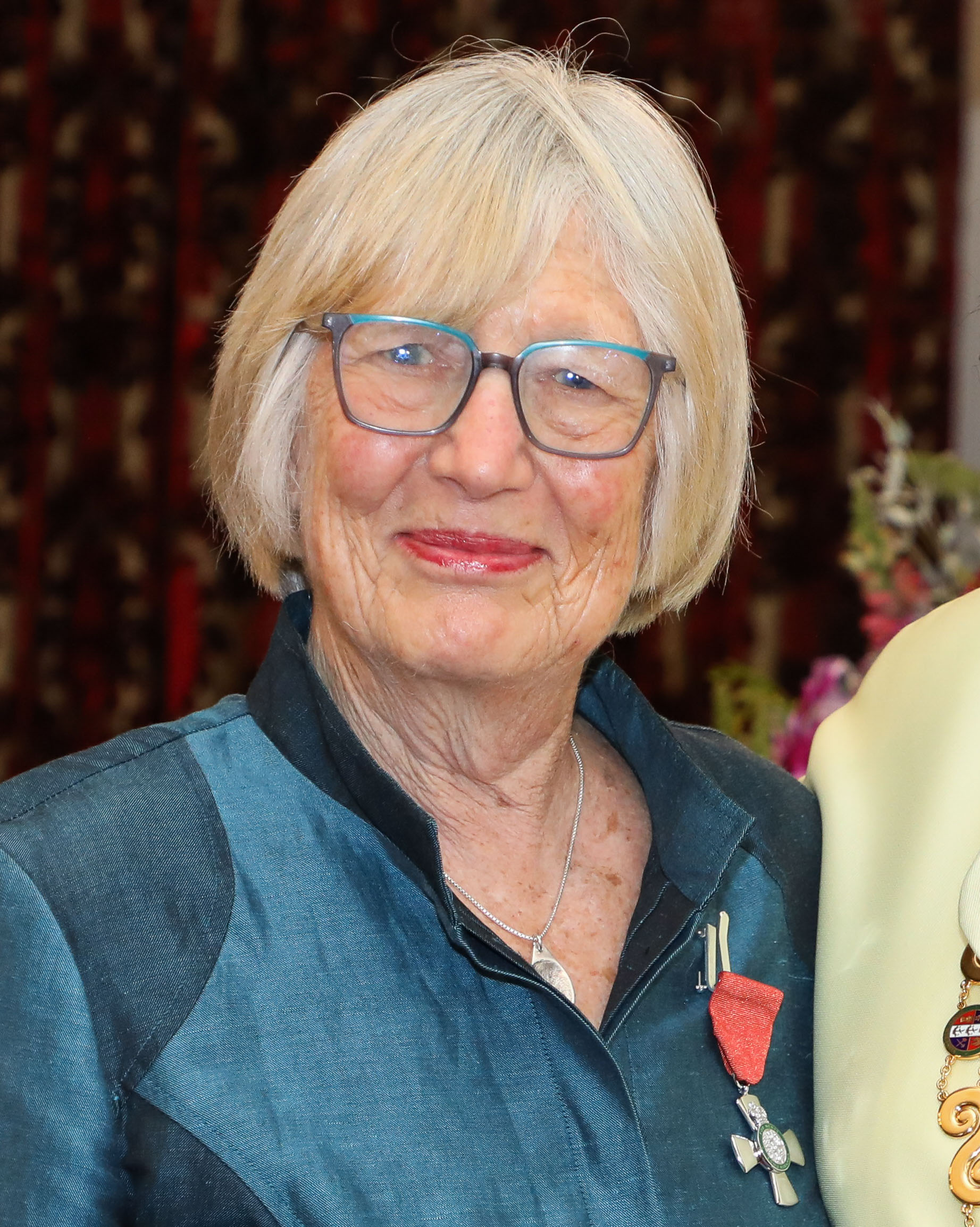
Shand in 2025

Diana Rosemary Shand MNZM is a New Zealand environmentalist. She served five terms on the Canterbury Regional Council, retiring in 2004. She was a Human Rights Commissioner, was regional councillor for Oceania for the International Union for Conservation of Nature (IUCN), and is chair of the North Canterbury branch of Forest & Bird.

== Early life and education ==
Shand's parents Olga and Arthur Shand were North Canterbury farmers, and ran the high-country sheep station "Island Hills", which is on the Dove River. She had an older sister and a brother. The children received their education via The Correspondence School, with the girls later attending the boarding school Woodford House in Havelock North.

== Career ==
In the late 1980s Shand served on the Human Rights Commission. She has also served five terms on the Canterbury Regional Council, from its inauguration in the 1989 local elections until the 2004 local elections, when she retired. She was National Programme Manager for the New Zealand office of the non-profit organisation ICLEI – Local Governments for Sustainability, which delivered a Communities for Climate Protection Programme in 2008.

Shand lived with her sister Lesley, also an environmental activist, on Montreal Street in Christchurch from the early 1980s. Their house became known for political and environmental meetings, covering causes such as the 1981 Springbok Tour protests, and tenant protection and local resident issues. Flatmates at the house included politician Lianne Dalziel and landscape architect Di Lucas.

Shand was the regional councillor for Oceania for the international NGO International Union for Conservation of Nature (IUCN), until 2016. She is also a member of the executive of Environment and Conservation Organisations of Aotearoa New Zealand. Shand attended the 1992 Earth Summit in Rio as a community member of the New Zealand delegation.

Shand is Chair of the North Canterbury branch of Forest & Bird. She has spoken out against the Fast-track Approvals Act 2024. Shand has lobbied that World Heritage Sites in New Zealand be added to Schedule 4 of the Crown Minerals Act 1991, which would protect the land from mining.

Shand lectured in marketing and business studies at both Christchurch Polytechnic Institute of Technology and the University of Canterbury.

== Honours and awards ==
In the 2025 King’s Birthday Honours, Shand was appointed a Member of the New Zealand Order of Merit, for services to the environment and the community.
