= Dove River, New Zealand =

In New Zealand, Dove River may refer to

- Dove River (Canterbury) in the Hurunui catchment
- Dove River (Tasman) a tributary of the Motueka River

== See also ==
- Dove River (disambiguation) for rivers in other countries
