= River Dove =

River Dove or Dove River may refer to:

In England

- River Dove, Central England
- River Dove, Suffolk
- River Dove, North Yorkshire
- River Dove, Barnsley

In Australia

- Dove River, Tasmania

In New Zealand

- Dove River, New Zealand (disambiguation)
