= Bryan Jenkins =

Australian environmental planner

Dr Bryan Jenkins is an Australian environmental planner. He has a Ph.D. in environmental planning from Stanford University, a master's degree in civil engineering from Adelaide University and a Master of Administration from Monash University.

Jenkins was director of environment, economics and planning for Kinhill Engineers, Adelaide, from 1989 to 1994, undertaking projects involving the Steel Authority of India, the Australian Nuclear Science and Technology Organisation, water and wastewater treatment plants in China, and the third runway at Sydney Airport.

He spent seven years (1994–2001) as chief executive of the former Western Australian Department of Environmental Protection, involved in preparation of an Air Quality Management Plan for Perth, as well as an Environmental Protection Policy and Environmental Management Plan for Cockburn Sound, Western Australia's most polluted marine water body. From 2001 to 2003, he was director of Murdoch Environment, the environmental consulting and education unit at Murdoch University. He was appointed CEO of Canterbury Regional Council in June 2003, was reappointed in March 2008, and finished as CEO February 2011. He has prepared over 200 professional and conference papers and keynote addresses, including being a keynote speaker at the New Zealand Planning Institute Conference, 2007. In November 2010 he was appointed the inaugural professorial fellow in strategic water studies (commencing March 2011) at the Waterways Centre for Freshwater Management, a joint centre of the University of Canterbury and Lincoln University.
