= Waikuku =

Town in Canterbury, New Zealand

- Rural settlement
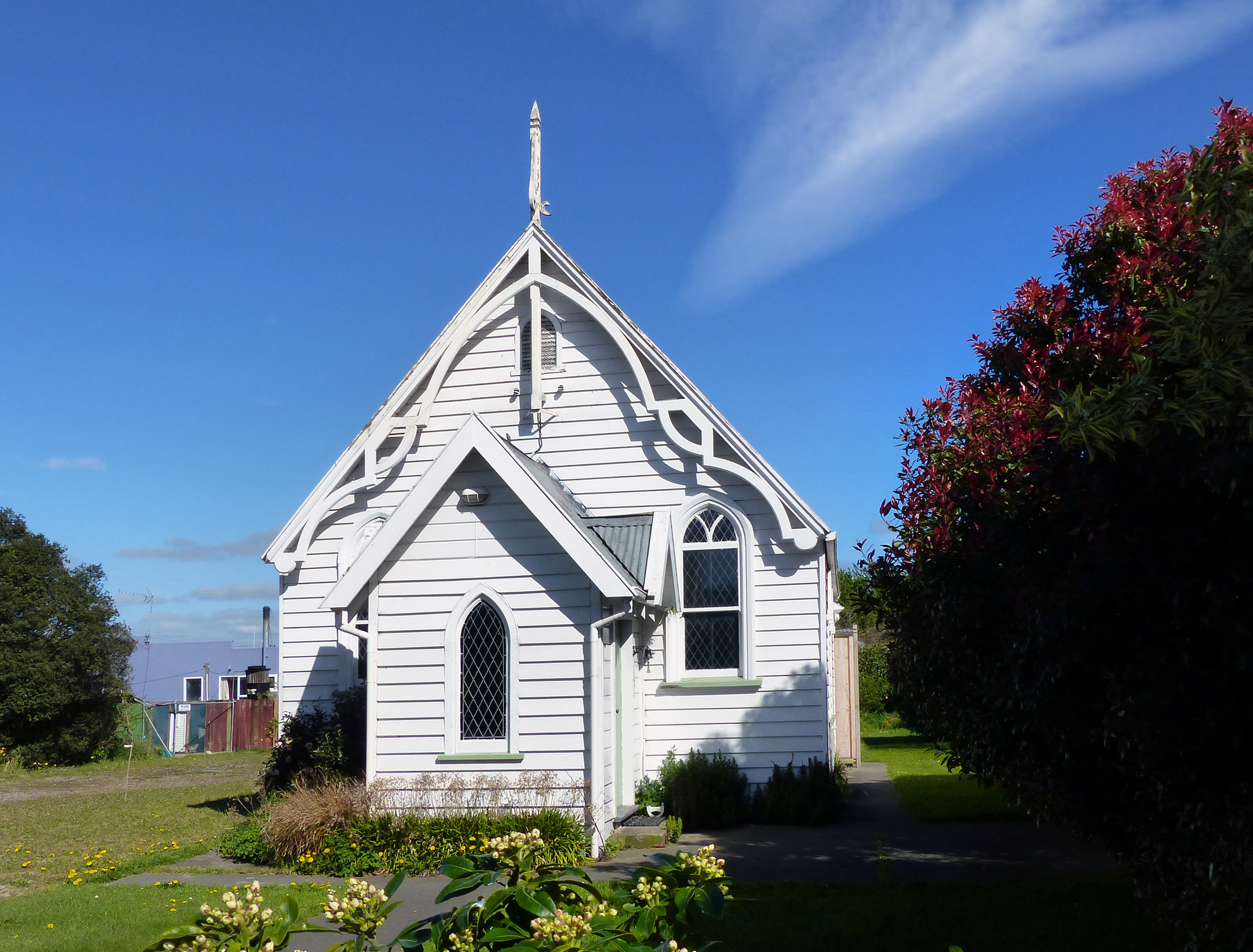
- Waikuku Methodist Church
- Interactive map of Waikuku
- Coordinates: 43.292°S 172.685°E
- Country: New Zealand
- Region: Canterbury
- Territorial authority: Waimakariri District
- Ward: Kaiapoi-Woodend Ward
- Community: Woodend-Sefton Community
- Electorates: Waimakariri; Te Tai Tonga (Māori)

Government
  - Territorial Authority: Waimakariri District Council
  - Regional council: Environment Canterbury
  - Mayor of Waimakariri: Dan Gordon
  - Waimakariri MP: Matt Doocey
  - Te Tai Tonga MP: Tākuta Ferris

Area
  - Total: 1.60 km^{2} (0.62 sq mi)

Population (June 2025)
  - Total: 160
  - Density: 100/km^{2} (260/sq mi)
- Time zone: UTC+12 (NZST)
  - Summer (DST): UTC+13 (NZDT)
- Postcode: 7473
- Area code: 03

Waikuku is a small town in the Canterbury region of New Zealand, which sits 28 km north of central Christchurch. Waikuku lies 11.8 km (7.3 mi) south of Leithfield on state highway 1 and 3 km (1.9 mi) north of Woodend. In 1901 there were 86 people resident in Waikuku according to that year's census. Waikuku settlement had a population of 156 people at the time of the 2018 Census. It is popular with both those that commute into work in Christchurch each day and with owners of holiday houses. Waikuku was home to rope and twine works. This business started off using flax from local swamps. It closed in 1987. The nearby sandy beach and pine forests are popular with surfers, swimmers, campers and horse-riders, and the large estuary of the Ashley River hosts many species of birds.

Just south of Waikuku, on Preeces Road, are the remains of the Kaiapoi Pa, an important trading centre for Ngāi Tahu in the 18th century.

== Road safety ==
The section of State Highway 1 that runs through the middle of Waikuku has been described as "one of the most notorious roads in Canterbury" by Waka Kotahi NZ Transport Agency noting that "In the ten years from 2009 to 2018, six people were killed and 33 were seriously injured in crashes" on State Highway in North Canterbury. As a result, the speed limit through the Waikuku township is being reduced from between 80 km/h and 100 km/h to 60 km/h from December 2020. This has led to frustration as the North Canterbury community have been requesting the road to be upgraded to the proposed but unfunded extension of the Christchurch Northern motorway (including the Woodend Bypass).

== Demographics ==
Waikuku is described by Stats NZ as a rural settlement and covers 1.60 km^{2} (0.62 sq mi). It had an estimated population of 160 as of June 2025, with a population density of 100 people per km^{2}. Waikuku is part of the larger Waikuku statistical area.

Historical population for Waikuku settlement
Year	Pop.	±% p.a.
2006	105	—
2013	120	+1.93%
2018	156	+5.39%
2023	150	−0.78%

Waikuku had a population of 150 in the 2023 New Zealand census, a decrease of 6 people (−3.8%) since the 2018 census, and an increase of 30 people (25.0%) since the 2013 census. There were 75 males, 69 females, and 3 people of other genders in 54 dwellings. 2.0% of people identified as LGBTIQ+. The median age was 51.6 years (compared with 38.1 years nationally). There were 21 people (14.0%) aged under 15 years, 24 (16.0%) aged 15 to 29, 78 (52.0%) aged 30 to 64, and 27 (18.0%) aged 65 or older.

People could identify as more than one ethnicity. The results were 94.0% European (Pākehā), 8.0% Māori, 4.0% Pasifika, 4.0% Asian, and 4.0% other, which includes people giving their ethnicity as "New Zealander". English was spoken by 98.0%, Māori by 2.0%, and other languages by 4.0%. No language could be spoken by 2.0% (e.g. too young to talk). The percentage of people born overseas was 16.0, compared with 28.8% nationally.

Religious affiliations were 32.0% Christian, 2.0% Buddhist, 4.0% New Age, and 2.0% other religions. People who answered that they had no religion were 54.0%, and 6.0% of people did not answer the census question.

Of those at least 15 years old, 21 (16.3%) people had a bachelor's or higher degree, 78 (60.5%) had a post-high school certificate or diploma, and 30 (23.3%) people exclusively held high school qualifications. The median income was $43,700, compared with $41,500 nationally. 15 people (11.6%) earned over $100,000 compared to 12.1% nationally. The employment status of those at least 15 was 66 (51.2%) full-time, 21 (16.3%) part-time, and 3 (2.3%) unemployed.

=== Waikuku statistical area ===
Waikuku statistical areas, which also include Waikuku Beach and Ravenswood, covers 28.74 km^{2} (11.10 sq mi). It had an estimated population of 3,660 as of June 2025, with a population density of 127.3 people per km^{2}.

Historical populations for Waikuku statistical areas
Year	Pop.	±% p.a.
2006	1,413	—
2013	1,455	+0.42%
2018	1,632	+2.32%
2023	2,847	+11.77%

The statistical areas had a population of 2,847 in the 2023 New Zealand census, an increase of 1,215 people (74.4%) since the 2018 census, and an increase of 1,392 people (95.7%) since the 2013 census. There were 1,410 males, 1,422 females, and 15 people of other genders in 1,077 dwellings. 3.7% of people identified as LGBTIQ+. There were 588 people (20.7%) aged under 15 years, 522 (18.3%) aged 15 to 29, 1,365 (47.9%) aged 30 to 64, and 378 (13.3%) aged 65 or older.

People could identify as more than one ethnicity. The results were 88.2% European (Pākehā); 11.7% Māori; 2.0% Pasifika; 7.4% Asian; 1.2% Middle Eastern, Latin American and African New Zealanders (MELAA); and 2.1% other, which includes people giving their ethnicity as "New Zealander". English was spoken by 96.6%, Māori by 2.2%, Samoan by 0.1%, and other languages by 10.7%. No language could be spoken by 2.7% (e.g. too young to talk). New Zealand Sign Language was known by 0.3%. The percentage of people born overseas was 22.6, compared with 28.8% nationally.

Religious affiliations were 27.6% Christian, 0.8% Hindu, 0.3% Islam, 0.4% Māori religious beliefs, 0.6% Buddhist, 0.9% New Age, and 2.4% other religions. People who answered that they had no religion were 59.3%, and 7.5% of people did not answer the census question.

Of those at least 15 years old, 504 (22.3%) people had a bachelor's or higher degree, 1,317 (58.3%) had a post-high school certificate or diploma, and 438 (19.4%) people exclusively held high school qualifications. 219 people (9.7%) earned over $100,000 compared to 12.1% nationally. The employment status of those at least 15 was 1,278 (56.6%) full-time, 321 (14.2%) part-time, and 57 (2.5%) unemployed.

Individual statistical areas
Name	Area (km^{2})	Population	Density (per km^{2})	Dwellings	Median age	Median income
Waikuku	25.47	624	24	234	45.4 years	$41,300
Ravenswood	1.75	1,152	658	435	31.0 years	$54,100
Waikuku Beach	1.52	1,071	705	408	44.4 years	$41,600
New Zealand					38.1 years	$41,500

== Education ==
Waikuku presently has no schools. The town previously had one full primary (Year 1–8) school, Waikuku School, which opened in 1873. The school outgrew its site in the late 2000s and early 2010s, and in April 2014 was relocated to a new site in Pegasus, New Zealand and renamed Pegasus Bay School. The site is now used as an outdoor shopping mall called Old School Collective.

Primary school students today are zoned for Pegasus Bay School; secondary school students are zoned for Kaiapoi High School in Kaiapoi.

== Bibliography ==
- "Waikuku and Waikuku Beach, Canterbury, New Zealand – Information". Archived from the original on 19 August 2007.
