= Lake Tekapo Regional Park =

Regional park in New Zealand

- Takapō Regional Park
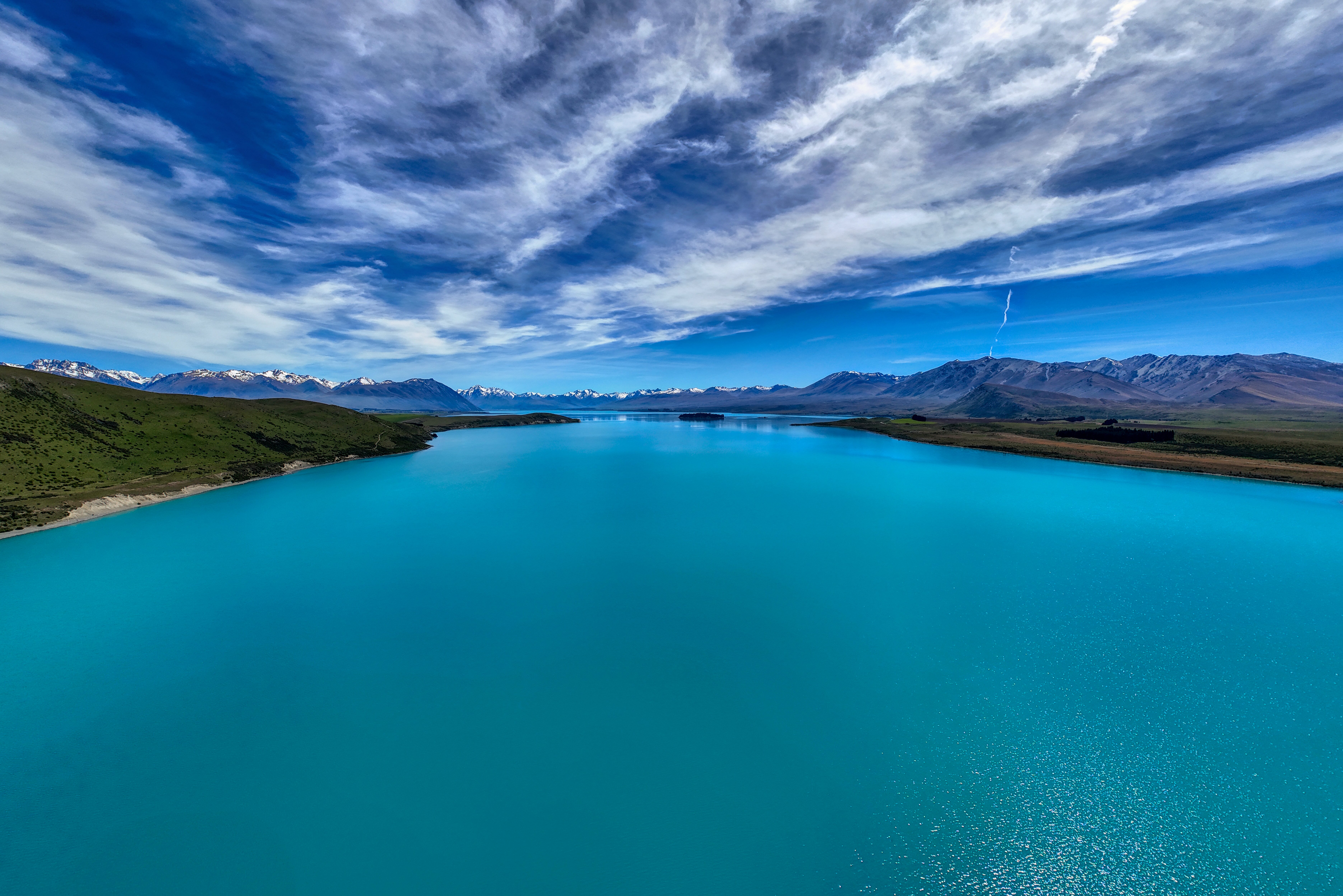
- View across Lake Tekapo

- Location within South Island
- Location: New Zealand
- Coordinates: 44°00′30″S 170°30′00″E
- Area: 165 hectares (410 acres)
- Created: 1989
- Operator: Environment Canterbury

Lake Tekapo Regional Park (also known as Takapō Regional Park), is a regional park in the Canterbury Region of New Zealand's South Island. It covers 165 hectares (410 acres) at the eastern side of the southern end of Lake Tekapo, east of the Lake Tekapo township. It is the newest of the four Canterbury regional parks managed by Environment Canterbury.

== History ==
=== Pre-European history ===
Local Māori call the lake "Takapo" meaning "leave by night". According to oral history, the lake has a taniwha (monster), and the tohunga (spiritual leader) Hipa Te Maiharoa is the only person to have swum the lake and escaped it.

Ngāi Tahu used the lake as a source for a source of waterfowl and a species of eel they call tuna.

=== European settlement ===
Europeans settled the Mackenzie Basin in the mid-1850s, establishing part of Tekapo Station at the site of the current regional park. The station was divided between Mt Hay Station and Sawdwon Stations in 1948.

In 1951, the completion of Lake Tekapo Dam submerged a homestead on the site. In 1957, fencing and tree planting of the area began to control soil erosion and drifting sands; the plantings were mostly Corsican, Lodgepole and Ponderosa pine with some European larch. In 1963, the area was vested as a Soil Conservation Reserve.

=== Regional park ===
Environment Canterbury took over stewardship of the site in 1989.

The Lake Tekapo Recreational Park Society was established in August 2008. It provides support the council in developing the park and coordinate volunteer activities, with funding from local businesses and organisations.

In 2011, the society proposed the development of an area in the park for a caravan park.

In 2019, the society called for a reduction to the main access road to the park due to a "rapid rise" in the number of people using the park.

=== Naming ===
"Tekapo" is a misspelling of Takapō, the name of the lake in the Māori language. Takapō means "to leave in haste at night". In 2021, the Mackenzie District Council announced that it will start using the dual names of Tekapo and Takapō when referring to Lake Tekapo. Environment Canterbury refers to the park as Takapō Regional Park.

== Recreation ==
The park has 24 kilometres of mountain biking, cycling, walking and running tracks, graded for difficulty. There are extensive conifers, views of the lake and Two Thumb Range. There is an orienteering course, and cross-country skiing is also possible in winter.

The park also features a 2 hectares (4.9 acres) fully fenced dog park, shallow swimming beaches, picnic tables and picnic spots, disc golf facilities, and a public toilet. There are no on-site barbecues and fires are banned, but people can bring their own enclosed barbecue and gas to use near the beach.

Boats are allowed in the lake, but there is a 5 knot speed limit for paddle, sail and power craft in a designated area near the park.

Stuff listed the park as one of the best dog-friendly destinations in New Zealand, while the New Zealand Herald listed it as one of the best autumn destinations. The Vancouver Sun recommended a hike of the regional park as part of a New Zealand holiday.

The park can be accessed via Lilybank Road, or on tracks from the Lake Tekapo township and Cowans Hill.
