= Catharine Squires =

Church leader in New Zealand

Catharine Squires (née Dewes, known as Kate, 1843–1912) was a notable New Zealand church leader. She was born in Leamington, Warwickshire, England in 1843. She preached the Plymouth Brethren faith in Woodend, Pyramid Creek near Gore, and at Bluff in Southland.
