= Craig Pauling =

New Zealand politician

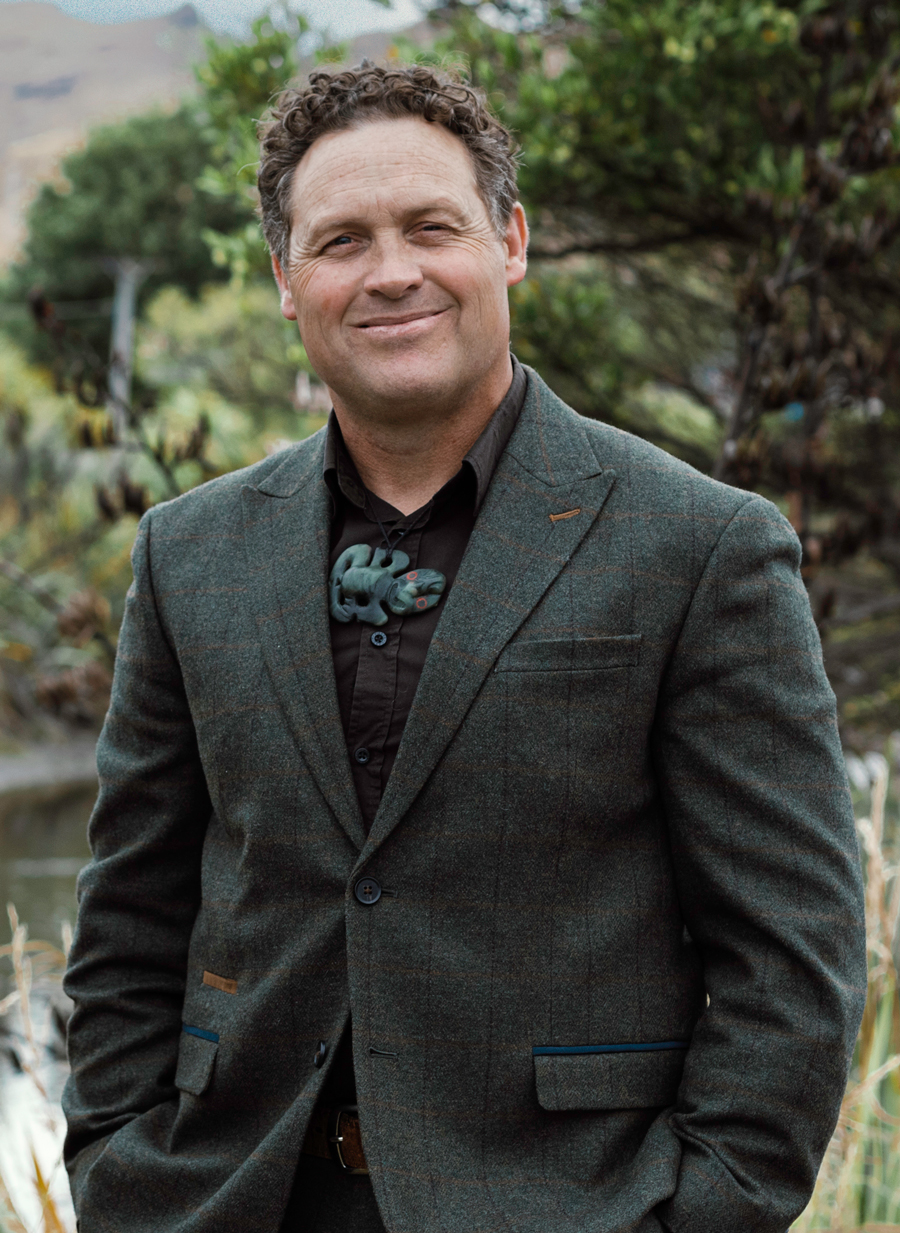
- Pauling in 2026

Chair of Environment Canterbury
- In office 16 October 2024 – 17 October 2025
- Preceded by: Peter Scott

Deputy Chair of Environment Canterbury
- In office October 2019 – October 2024

Personal details
- Party: Green
- Children: 3
- Website: https://craigpauling.nz/

Craig Aaron Pauling is a New Zealand politician and environmental scientist. He was chairperson of Canterbury Regional Council (Environment Canterbury) from October 2024 to October 2025 and a member of the council for six years from 2019. A member of the Green Party, Pauling is the party's candidate for Banks Peninsula at the 2026 general election.

== Early life and education ==
Pauling is of Ngāi Tahu, Ngāti Mutunga and European descent. He attended high school at Aranui High School and graduated from Lincoln University with a degree in environmental management. He later completed postgraduate qualifications in social science and ecology, and worked at Manaaki Whenua Landcare Research.

== Political career ==
New Zealand Parliament
Years	Term	Electorate	List	Party
2026–present	55th	List	14	Green

Pauling was first elected to the Canterbury Regional Council (Environment Canterbury) in the Christchurch West/Ōpuna constituency in 2019. He was elected for a second term in 2022.

After the 2022 local elections, Pauling was one of two candidates nominated to be the regional council chair. The incumbent chair, Peter Scott, was the other candidate. The vote was tied and the tie was broken by randomly drawing a name from a container. Scott retained the chair and Pauling was unanimously appointed deputy chair.

In 2024, Scott twice stepped down as chair temporarily due to controversies following his admission he was undertaking illegal practices on his farm and repeatedly speeding in a council-owned car. Pauling acted as chair during these periods and was elected to the chair in October 2024 when Scott resigned. Deon Swiggs, the other councillor in the Christchurch West/Ōpuna constituency, was elected as Pauling's deputy.

It was announced on 1 August 2025 that Pauling would not contest the 2025 local elections. In January 2026, Pauling was confirmed as the Green Party's candidate for the Banks Peninsula electorate in the 2026 general election. He is ranked 14th on the Green Party's party list for the election. On 7 November, Pauling came third place in the Banks Peninsula based on preliminary results. He was elected into the New Zealand Parliament on the Green Party list.

== Personal life ==
Pauling is the father of three children. He has won national and international waka ama (outrigger sea canoe) titles, and can speak te reo Māori.
