= Deon Swiggs =

New Zealand activist and politician

Chair of Canterbury Regional Council Deon Swiggs
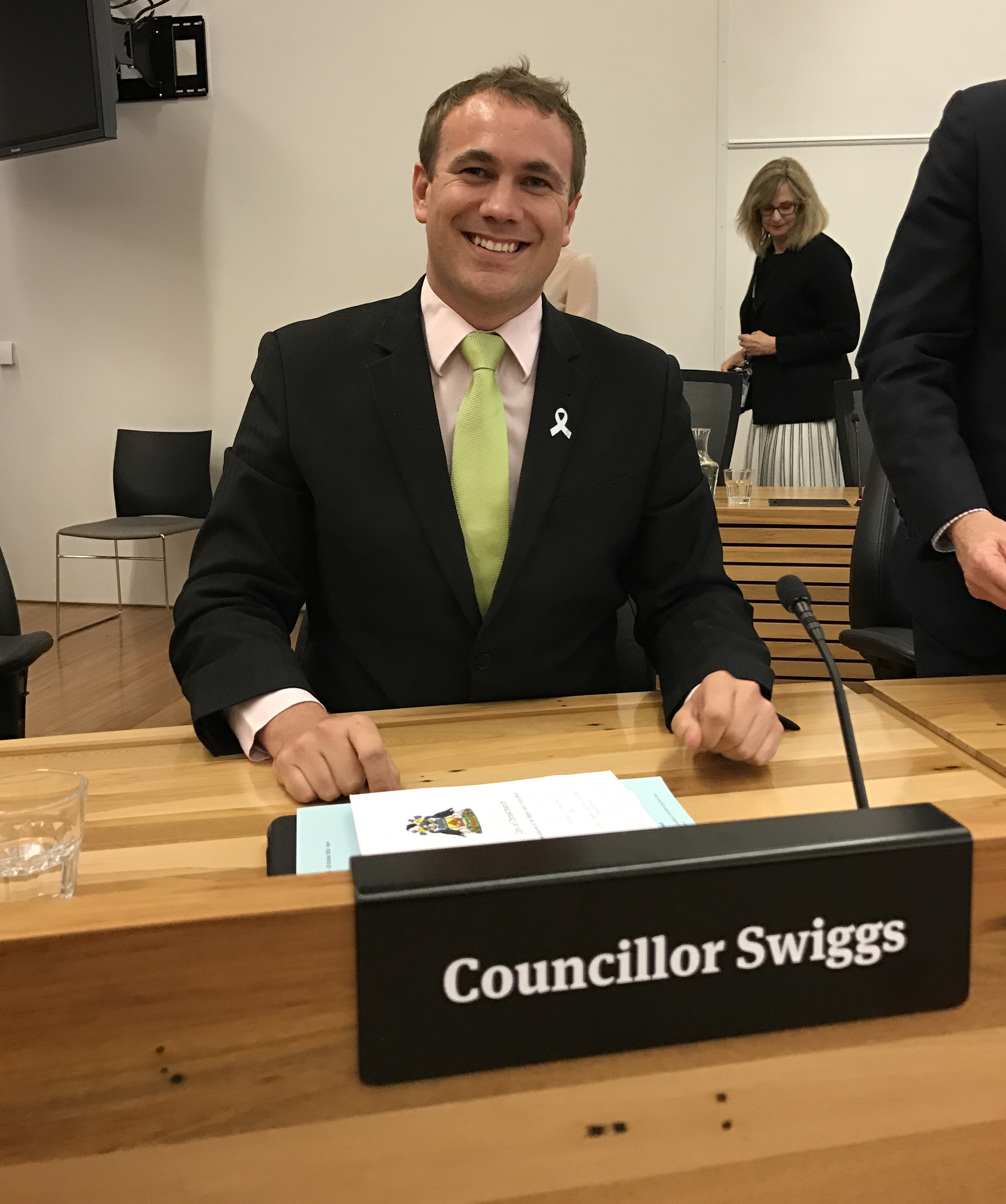
- Swiggs in the Christchurch City Council chamber

Christchurch City Councillor
- In office 8 October 2016 – October 2019
- Succeeded by: Jake McLellan
- Constituency: Central Ward

Environment Canterbury Councillor
- Incumbent
- Assumed office 8 October 2022 Serving with Sara Gerard
- Preceded by: Megan Hands
- Constituency: Christchurch West/Ōpuna

Personal details
- Born: 6 September 1986 (age 40) Nelson, New Zealand
- Party: Labour Party (until 2016)
- Website: https://deonswiggs.com

Deon William Swiggs (born 6 September 1986) is a New Zealand politician and community leader. He serves as chair of the Canterbury Regional Council and serves as councillor representing the Christchurch West/Ōpuna regional constituency. He previously served from 2016 to 2019 on Christchurch City Council representing the Central ward. Before entering elected office, he founded the civic initiative Rebuild Christchurch following the 2010 Canterbury earthquake.

== Early life and education ==
Swiggs was born in Nelson, New Zealand, and is the eldest of three siblings. Until Swiggs was 5, he was raised at Parihaka Pa as a Christian. Swiggs was educated at Marlborough Boys' College where he was a sixth form prefect. After graduating in 2004, Swiggs joined the Royal New Zealand Navy in 2005 as a navigation officer. Swiggs left the Navy in 2008 to pursue a career in the business sector. In 2008, Swiggs worked as a real estate agent for Harcourts in New Plymouth before transferring to Christchurch in 2009. He left the company in 2010 to form Swiggs Consulting Limited. Later in 2010, Swiggs was offered the position of South Island Accounts Manager at AdzUp.

Two days after the onset of the 2010 Canterbury earthquake, Swiggs founded Rebuild Christchurch, an organisation which dedicated to collating recovery information from a variety of sources and disseminating the material in an easy-to-understand format for residents affected by the shock. Swiggs has been called one of the innovating new entrepreneurs born out of the Christchurch earthquakes. On 22 February 2011, Swiggs was in the AdzUp office located in the Christchurch CBD when the 2011 Christchurch earthquake struck.

In April 2011, Swiggs was made redundant from AdzUp due to the earthquakes. From this time, Swiggs worked full-time on RebuildChristchurch.co.nz and studied on the side. In 2012, Swiggs was nominated for Young New Zealander of the Year. and was named alongside Roger Sutton and Bob Parker as a leader in the Canterbury Rebuild.

Swiggs was accepted into a placement at the Christchurch Polytechnic Institute of Technology (CPIT) in February 2013 into a Bachelor of Applied Management. In March 2013, Swiggs graduated from CPIT with a bachelor's degree in Applied Management majoring in Sales and Marketing as well as a graduate diploma in Innovation and Entrepreneurship. In 2025, Swiggs was also awarded a Doctor of Business Administration from GlobalNxt University.

== Political career ==
=== Christchurch City Council (2016–2019) ===
The Press reported on 27 April 2013 that Swiggs was contemplating running for Councillor of the Christchurch City Council. On 26 August 2013, Swiggs announced he had put his nomination forward for the Christchurch East by-election. On 22 September 2013, Swiggs found his nomination was unsuccessful. Poto Williams was selected and elected Member of Parliament in that year.

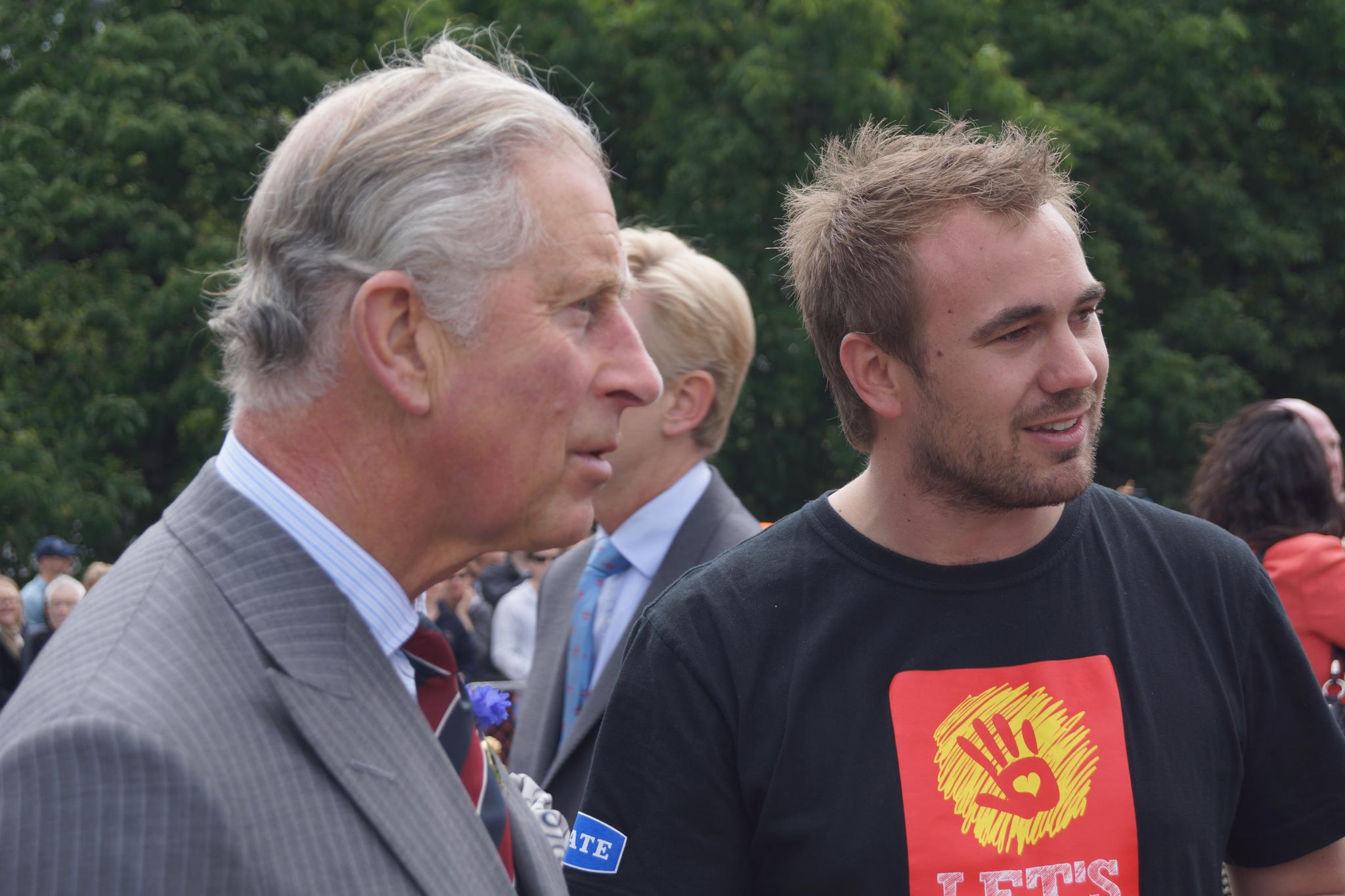
Deon Swiggs meets Prince Charles in Christchurch (2013)

In July 2015, Swiggs and Christchurch broadcaster Chris Lynch along with award-winning filmmaker Gerard Smyth spent a week interviewing various citizens of Christchurch about their views on the Christchurch Earthquake Recovery Act draft transition recovery plan, which expired in April 2016. The resulting video, When a City Falls, was watched more than 30,000 times in the first day of being published.

On 31 May 2016, Swiggs announced that he would stand for Christchurch City Council as an independent in the newly created Christchurch Central ward in the 2016 local body elections. On 8 October 2016, he was elected to the council.

Swiggs was a founding trustee on the Canterbury Insurance Advocacy Service funded by council to advocate for people with insurance issues. Swiggs resigned as a trustee on 23 December 2016.

During his term, Swiggs focused on central-city rebuilding, infrastructure renewal (including underground services and transport), social issues such as homelessness, and community engagement. He served on committees for housing and community development and engaged actively with residents’ associations within his ward. He sought re-election in the 2019 local elections but was defeated by Jake McLellan and ceased being a city councillor in October 2019.

=== Environment Canterbury (2022–present) ===
Swiggs returned to the local government in October 2022 when he was elected to Environment Canterbury for the Christchurch West/Ōpuna constituency. In this role, he has emphasised issues such as freshwater and water-quality management, climate change adaptation, transport connectivity, and regional planning collaboration.

In October 2024 he was appointed Deputy Chair of the Council.

In the 2025 local elections he was re-elected. According to final results published 17 October 2025, in the Christchurch West/Ōpuna constituency he polled 14,806 votes, he is joined by Sara Gerard (14,453) replacing Craig Pauling. Deon outpolled Michael Bennett (8,629) and Colin Meurk (8,115).

He has publicly announced his intention to contest the chairpersonship of the council at the first meeting of the new term.

Canterbury Regional Council (Environment Canterbury)
Years	Constituency	Affiliation
2022–2025	Christchurch West/Ōpuna	Independent
2025–Present	Christchurch West/Ōpuna	Independent

== Community and civic involvement ==
Swiggs has maintained a longstanding involvement in the Christchurch community. The Rebuild Christchurch Foundation, which he founded in 2010, has undertaken work supporting quake-affected suburbs, delivering resources and information, coordinating community events, and amplifying resident voices in the rebuilding process.

He was a founding trustee of the Canterbury Insurance Advocacy Service (a council-funded trust assisting homeowners with earthquake-related insurance claims) and has engaged in youth-government and community-leadership networks to promote civic participation.

== Allegations and complaints ==
In September 2019, Swiggs publicly disclosed that he was the Christchurch City Councillor under investigation by the city council for complaints alleging inappropriate messaging and behaviour at youth-oriented events. He denied any wrongdoing. The council’s code-of-conduct investigation did not proceed to full conclusion after his term ended.

Screenshots released by Swiggs on 3 October 2019 reveal some of the messages related to the complaint made by the Canterbury Youth Workers Collective. A preliminary investigation revealed that two of the complaints warranted further investigation, while a third complaint was referred to another agency, presumed to be the police.

== Personal life and recognition ==
Swiggs holds a Doctor of Business Administration and describes himself as a small-business owner and entrepreneur. At the time of his 2016 election he became the first openly gay Christchurch City Councillor and remains a supporter of LGBTQ+ community causes.

Swiggs was nominated for Young New Zealander of the Year in 2012 in recognition of his leadership in the post-earthquake recovery phase. He has also been recognized for his community service at the Volunteering Canterbury Volunteer Recognition Awards in 2013 and is the recipient of the Christchurch City Council Service Youth Award.

== Projects ==
Swiggs has worked on several projects, including:

- Project Christmas
- Lets Get It Done
- Football in the Gap
- The Canterbury Insurance Assistance Service
- Buck Brings Back Marmite
- A Beautiful Struggle
- Christchurch Panoramas
- Eyes East
