= Woodend, New Zealand =

Town in Canterbury, New Zealand

Woodend
- Minor urban area
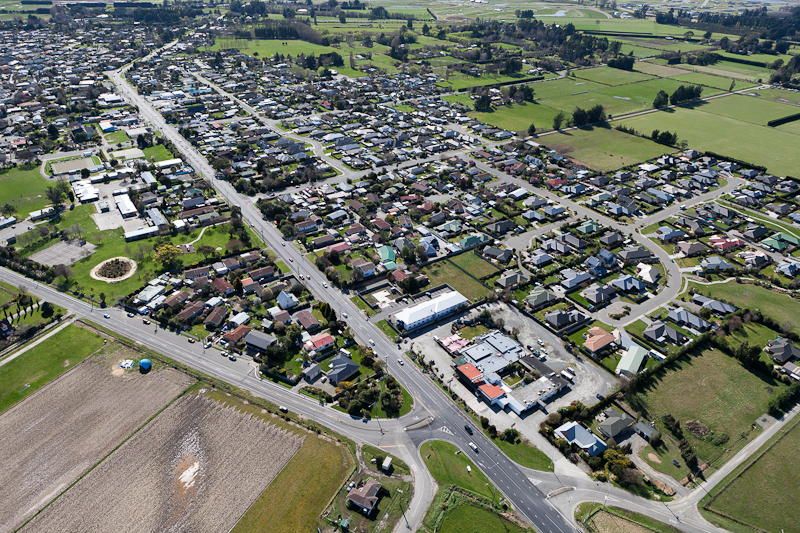
- Woodend in 2010
- Interactive map of Woodend
- Coordinates: 43°19′S 172°40′E
- Country: New Zealand
- Region: Canterbury
- Territorial authority: Waimakariri District
- Ward: Kaiapoi-Woodend Ward
- Community: Rangiora-Ashley Community; Kaiapoi-Woodend Community
- Electorates: Waimakariri; Te Tai Tonga (Māori)

Government
  - Territorial Authority: Waimakariri District Council
  - Regional council: Environment Canterbury
  - Mayor of Waimakariri: Dan Gordon
  - Waimakariri MP: Matt Doocey
  - Te Tai Tonga MP: Mananui Ramsden

Area
  - Total: 5.99 km^{2} (2.31 sq mi)
- Elevation: 14 m (46 ft)

Population (June 2025)
  - Total: 5,470
  - Density: 913/km^{2} (2,370/sq mi)
- Postcode: 7610

Woodend is a town in the Waimakariri District, in the Canterbury Region of the South Island of New Zealand. It may have been named because it was on the edge of what was then called the Maori Bush, or after an early settler, Thomas Wooding. It is situated with both the Waimakariri and Ashley / Rakahuri Rivers running either side. Woodend is 6.6 kilometres north of Kaiapoi and 6.3 kilometres to the east of Rangiora. Woodend is within walking distance of the town of Pegasus.

The town has a population of 5,470 (June 2025). It is 25 kilometres (16 mi) north of central Christchurch, and is part of the city's metropolitan area. Woodend is located near Woodend Beach. It is possible to go swimming, surfing, walking, running and horse riding there. The Tūhaitara Coastal Park is known for its walking and mountain biking trails. The Tutaepatu Trail links Woodend Beach, Pegasus Town and Waikuku Beach.

== Climate ==
The warmest months of the year are January and February, with an average high temperature of 23°C. The coldest month of the year occurs in July, when the average high temperature is 11°C. Monthly rainfall ranges between an average of 34mm in January and April to 63mm in July.

== Education ==
Woodend School is Woodend's only school. It is a state co-educational full primary school with a decile rating of 8 and a roll of 585 students (as of July 2026). It opened in 1874. There were earlier Methodist and Anglican schools at Woodend.

== Demographics ==
Woodend and Ravenswood are described by Stats NZ as a small urban area and covers 5.99 km^{2} (2.31 sq mi). The area had an estimated population of 5,470 as of June 2025, with a population density of 913 people per km^{2}.

Historical population for Woodend and Ravenswood
Year	Pop.	±% p.a.
2006	2,661	—
2013	2,769	+0.57%
2018	2,829	+0.43%
2023	4,542	+9.93%
The 2006 population is for a smaller area of 3.49 km^{2}. Source:

Woodend and Ravenswood had a population of 4,542 in the 2023 New Zealand census, an increase of 1,713 people (60.6%) since the 2018 census, and an increase of 1,773 people (64.0%) since the 2013 census. There were 2,229 males, 2,298 females, and 15 people of other genders in 1,623 dwellings. 3.0% of people identified as LGBTIQ+. The median age was 35.5 years (compared with 38.1 years nationally). There were 966 people (21.3%) aged under 15 years, 819 (18.0%) aged 15 to 29, 2,100 (46.2%) aged 30 to 64, and 660 (14.5%) aged 65 or older.

People could identify as more than one ethnicity. The results were 89.6% European (Pākehā); 12.8% Māori; 2.2% Pasifika; 5.4% Asian; 1.2% Middle Eastern, Latin American and African New Zealanders (MELAA); and 3.2% other, which includes people giving their ethnicity as "New Zealander". English was spoken by 96.4%, Māori by 2.4%, Samoan by 0.2%, and other languages by 8.1%. No language could be spoken by 3.0% (e.g. too young to talk). New Zealand Sign Language was known by 0.5%. The percentage of people born overseas was 18.8, compared with 28.8% nationally.

Religious affiliations were 26.6% Christian, 0.8% Hindu, 0.3% Islam, 0.4% Māori religious beliefs, 0.5% Buddhist, 0.5% New Age, and 2.0% other religions. People who answered that they had no religion were 61.6%, and 7.3% of people did not answer the census question.

Of those at least 15 years old, 648 (18.1%) people had a bachelor's or higher degree, 2,127 (59.5%) had a post-high school certificate or diploma, and 804 (22.5%) people exclusively held high school qualifications. The median income was $47,200, compared with $41,500 nationally. 318 people (8.9%) earned over $100,000 compared to 12.1% nationally. The employment status of those at least 15 was 2,034 (56.9%) full-time, 498 (13.9%) part-time, and 69 (1.9%) unemployed.

Individual statistical areas
Name	Area (km^{2})	Population	Density (per km^{2})	Dwellings	Median age	Median income
Ravenswood	1.75	1,152	658	435	31.0 years	$54,100
Woodend	4.25	3,390	798	1,188	38.3 years	$44,200
New Zealand					38.1 years	$41,500

== Ravenswood ==
A large subdivision called Ravenswood is being built on the northern edge of Woodend. The first residents moved in during 2019. It is expected to eventually have 1500 homes built on it, significantly enlarging the town of Woodend. The subdivision will include 13 hectares of commercial buildings including a petrol station, fast food restaurant and a supermarket. The subdivision was first launched in 2014 but was delayed after the death of the developer Bob Robertson.

== Government ==
The Waimakariri District Council provides local government services to Woodend. Woodend is part of the Waimakariri electorate.

== Notable buildings ==
=== Saint Barnabas Church ===
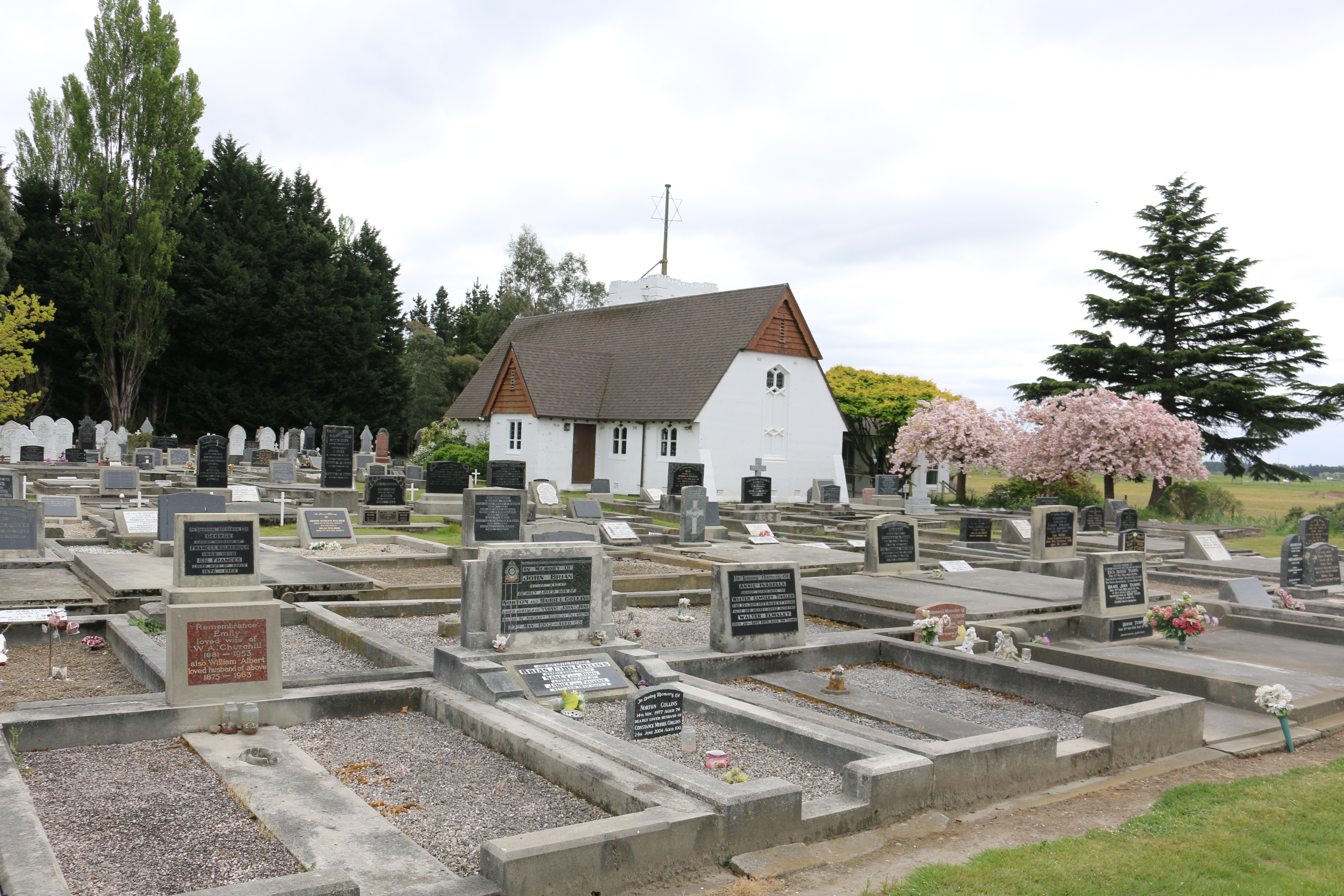
Saint Barnabas Anglican Church, Woodend

Saint Barnabas is the Woodend – Pegasus Anglican Parish Church. It replaced a previous church built on the site which was built in 1859–60. The previous church was condemned due to dry rot. The current church was designed by architect Cecil Wood in 1930 and opened in June 1933. In 1993 an extension containing meeting rooms and kitchen facilities was completed. This was designed by architect Don Donnithorne.

=== Woodend Methodist Church ===
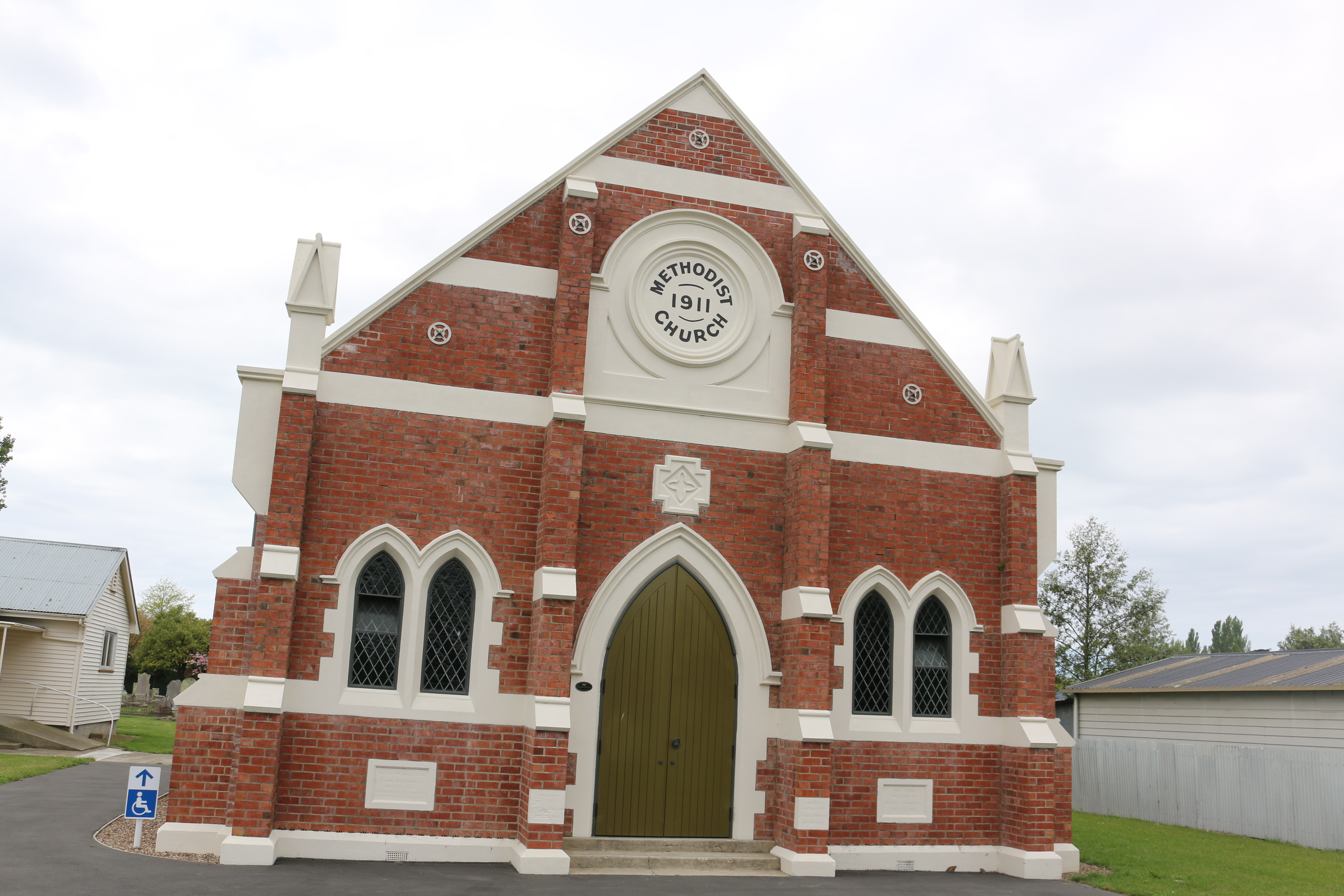
Woodend Methodist Church, Built 1911.

The Woodend Methodist Church was built in 1911. It was damaged in the 2010–2011 Christchurch Earthquakes and has subsequently been repaired.

== Transport ==
State Highway 1 runs through the middle of Woodend. Traffic volumes have been increasing every year and reached 20,000 cars per day in 2019. Frustrated local residents blocked State Highway 1 in February 2020 in protest. In September 2020, the traffic lights which had been promised by the New Zealand Transport Authority (NZTA) in 2020 to make crossing State Highway One had been delayed. The NZTA expects traffic volumes to double over the next 30 years. Its preferred solution is to build a new four-lane bypass which will join the current motorway at Lineside Road and run through to the entrance to Pegasus town. This proposed bypass has yet to be funded by the New Zealand government, In March 2021, it was listed as an "on the horizon" project only in Canterbury’s draft Regional Land Transport Plan.

== Notable residents ==
- Anton Cooper (born 1994), cross-country cyclist and World Under 23 Cross-country champion
- Catharine Squires, known as Kate, was a Plymouth Brethren preacher
