= Waikuku Beach =

Town in Canterbury, New Zealand

- Rural settlement
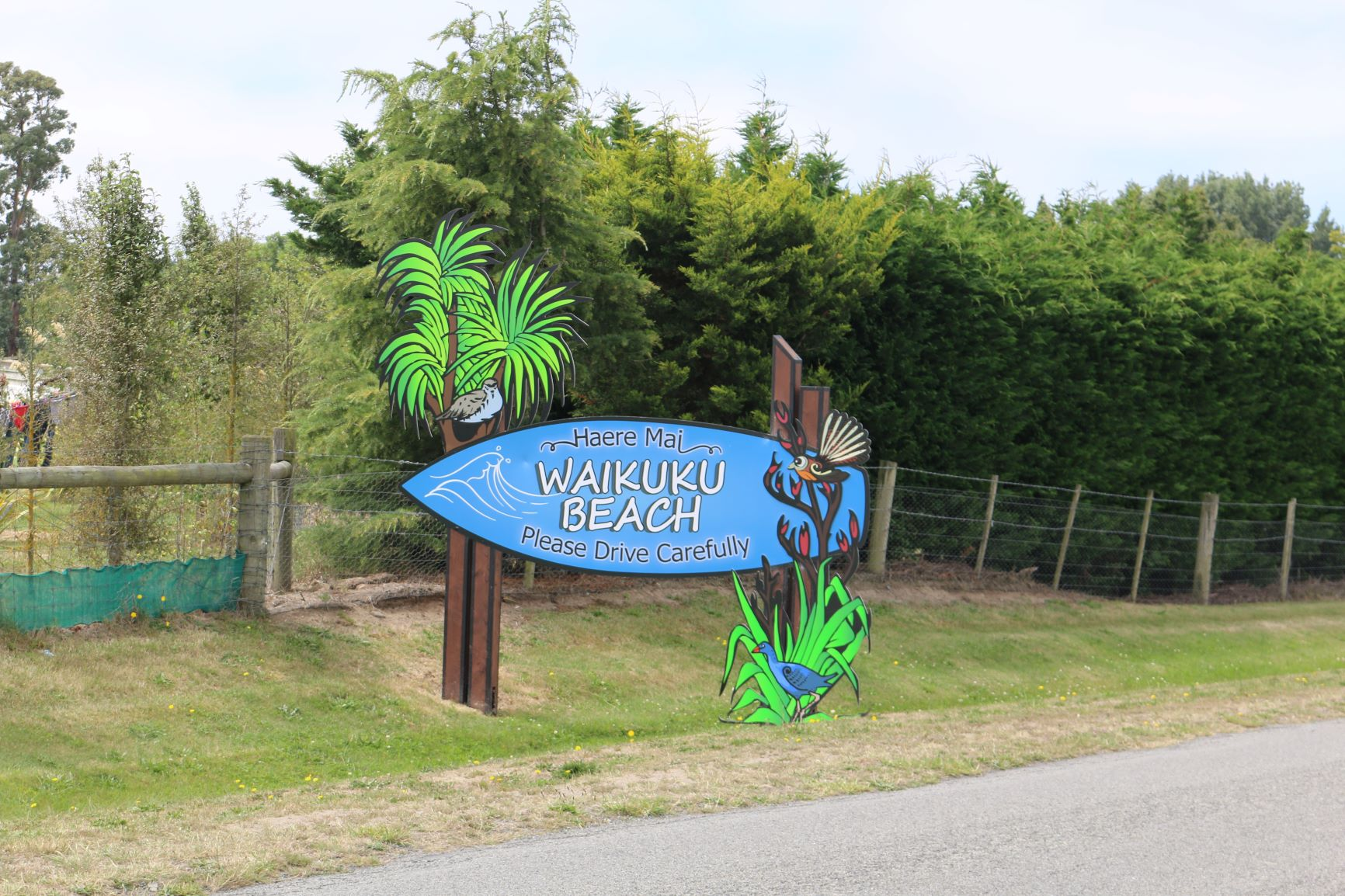
- Waikuku beach sign
- Interactive map of Waikuku Beach
- Coordinates: 43.287°S 172.716°E
- Country: New Zealand
- Region: Canterbury
- Territorial authority: Waimakariri District
- Ward: Kaiapoi-Woodend Ward
- Community: Woodend-Sefton Community
- Electorates: Waimakariri; Te Tai Tonga (Māori)

Government
  - Territorial Authority: Waimakariri District Council
  - Regional council: Environment Canterbury
  - Mayor of Waimakariri: Dan Gordon
  - Waimakariri MP: Matt Doocey
  - Te Tai Tonga MP: Tākuta Ferris

Area
  - Total: 1.52 km^{2} (0.59 sq mi)

Population (June 2025)
  - Total: 1,090
  - Density: 717/km^{2} (1,860/sq mi)
- Time zone: UTC+12 (NZST)
  - Summer (DST): UTC+13 (NZDT)
- Postcode: 7402
- Area code: 03

Waikuku Beach is a small settlement on the coast of the Canterbury region of New Zealand, about 3 km (1.9 mi) east of the settlement of Waikuku.

The sandy beach is popular with surfers and swimmers, and the large estuary of the Ashley River hosts many species of birds. The Waikuku beach has been rated as one of the ten best to learn to surf at.

== Demographics ==
Waikuku Beach is described by Stats NZ as a small urban area and covers 1.52 km^{2} (0.59 sq mi). It had an estimated population of 1,090 as of June 2025, with a population density of 717 people per km^{2}. Waikuku Beach is part of the larger Waikuku statistical area.

Historical population
| Year | Pop. | ±% p.a. |
|---|---|---|
| 2006 | 858 | — |
| 2013 | 900 | +0.69% |
| 2018 | 1,023 | +2.60% |
| 2023 | 1,071 | +0.92% |
The 2006 population is for a smaller area of 1.30 km^{2}. Source:

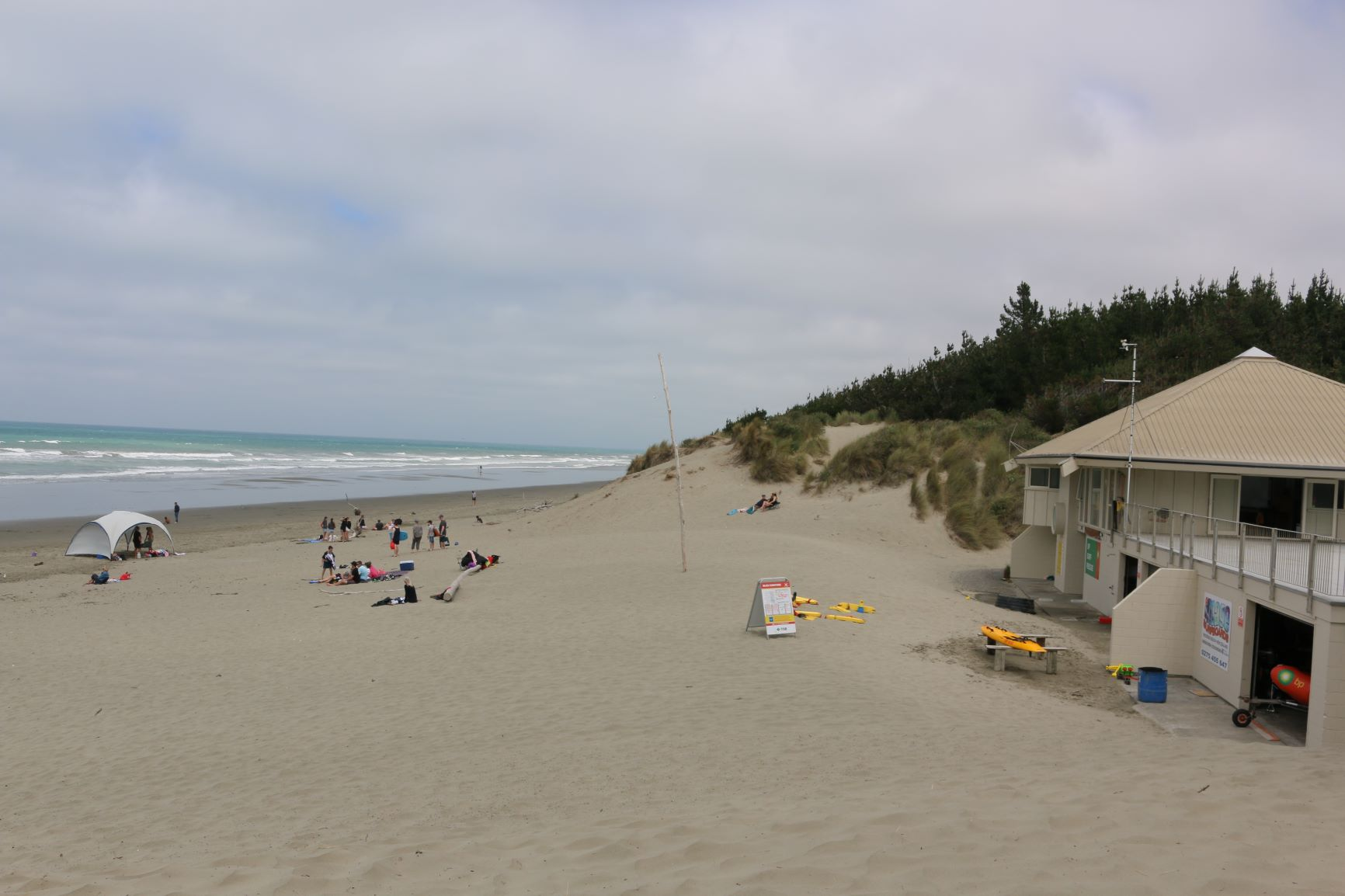
Waikuku Beach Surf Club (2021)

Waikuku Beach had a population of 1,071 in the 2023 New Zealand census, an increase of 48 people (4.7%) since the 2018 census, and an increase of 171 people (19.0%) since the 2013 census. There were 537 males, 531 females, and 3 people of other genders in 408 dwellings. 3.4% of people identified as LGBTIQ+. The median age was 44.4 years (compared with 38.1 years nationally). There were 210 people (19.6%) aged under 15 years, 156 (14.6%) aged 15 to 29, 537 (50.1%) aged 30 to 64, and 168 (15.7%) aged 65 or older.

People could identify as more than one ethnicity. The results were 94.7% European (Pākehā); 14.0% Māori; 1.1% Pasifika; 0.8% Asian; 0.3% Middle Eastern, Latin American and African New Zealanders (MELAA); and 2.2% other, which includes people giving their ethnicity as "New Zealander". English was spoken by 98.9%, Māori by 2.8%, and other languages by 6.7%. No language could be spoken by 1.4% (e.g. too young to talk). The percentage of people born overseas was 18.8, compared with 28.8% nationally.

Religious affiliations were 23.2% Christian, 0.6% Māori religious beliefs, 0.3% Buddhist, 0.8% New Age, and 0.8% other religions. People who answered that they had no religion were 65.3%, and 9.0% of people did not answer the census question.

Of those at least 15 years old, 195 (22.6%) people had a bachelor's or higher degree, 507 (58.9%) had a post-high school certificate or diploma, and 159 (18.5%) people exclusively held high school qualifications. The median income was $41,600, compared with $41,500 nationally. 90 people (10.5%) earned over $100,000 compared to 12.1% nationally. The employment status of those at least 15 was 429 (49.8%) full-time, 150 (17.4%) part-time, and 27 (3.1%) unemployed.
