= Dove River (Canterbury) =

Coordinates: 42°45′55″S 172°33′27″E

Location
- Country: New Zealand

Physical characteristics
- Source
  - elevation: 1,400 m (4,600 ft)
- Mouth
  - location: Mandamus River
  - elevation: 350 m (1,150 ft)

The Dove River is a river in the Canterbury region of New Zealand. It rises near Mount Te Kooti and runs southward, draining the Big Island Hills to its west and the Tekoa Range to the east.
