= Environment Canterbury =

Regional government in New Zealand

Environment Canterbury Kaunihera Taiao ki Waitaha

Type
- Type: Regional council of Canterbury

History
- Founded: 1989

Leadership
- Chair: Deon Swiggs
- Deputy Chair: Iaean Cranwell
- Chief Executive Officer: Stefanie Rixecker

Structure
- Seats: 14
- Political groups: Independent (11); The People's Choice (3)
- Length of term: 3 years, renewable

Elections
- Last election: 11 October 2025
- Next election: 2028

Meeting place
- 200 Tuam Street, Christchurch

Website
- Official website

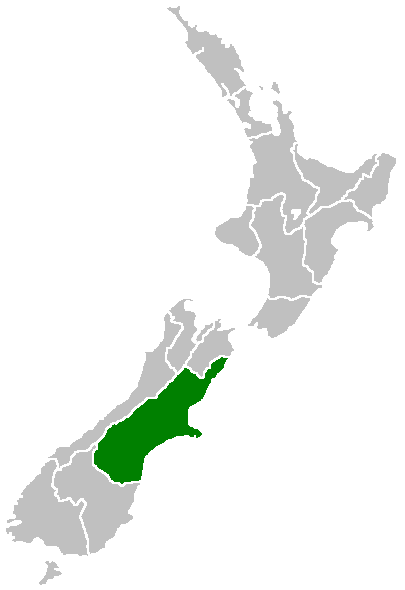
ECan is the regional council for the Canterbury region

Environment Canterbury, frequently abbreviated to ECan, is the promotional name for the Canterbury Regional Council. It is the regional council for Canterbury, the largest region in the South Island of New Zealand. It is part of New Zealand's structure of local government.

== Geographic coverage and responsibilities ==
The area of its jurisdiction consists of all the river catchments on the east coast of the South Island from the Clarence River, north of Kaikōura, to the southern catchment boundary of the Waitaki River, in South Canterbury. The region includes the Canterbury Plains, north and south Canterbury, the major braided rivers of the South Island, (the Waimakariri River, the Rakaia River and the Rangitata River) the Mackenzie Basin and the Waitaki River.

The Canterbury Regional Council is responsible for a wide variety of functions including public passenger transport, regional biosecurity, river engineering, environmental monitoring and investigations, regional policy and planning and for considering applications for certain resource consents – land use consents (including beds of waterbodies), coastal permits, water permits, and discharge permits. Canterbury Regional Council has strategic responsibilities for air, water and transport.

Christchurch often has temperature inversions which trap pollutants causing air quality issues. ECan set up the Clean Heat Project in 2002 and it ran until 2011 to assist with cleaner burning home heating and extra home insulation.

== History ==
The Canterbury Regional Council's predecessor was the Canterbury United Council that was formed in 1979, which was the first regional government body in New Zealand since the end of the provinces in 1876. However this united council was replaced by the current regional council in 1989 after local government reforms.

== Offices ==
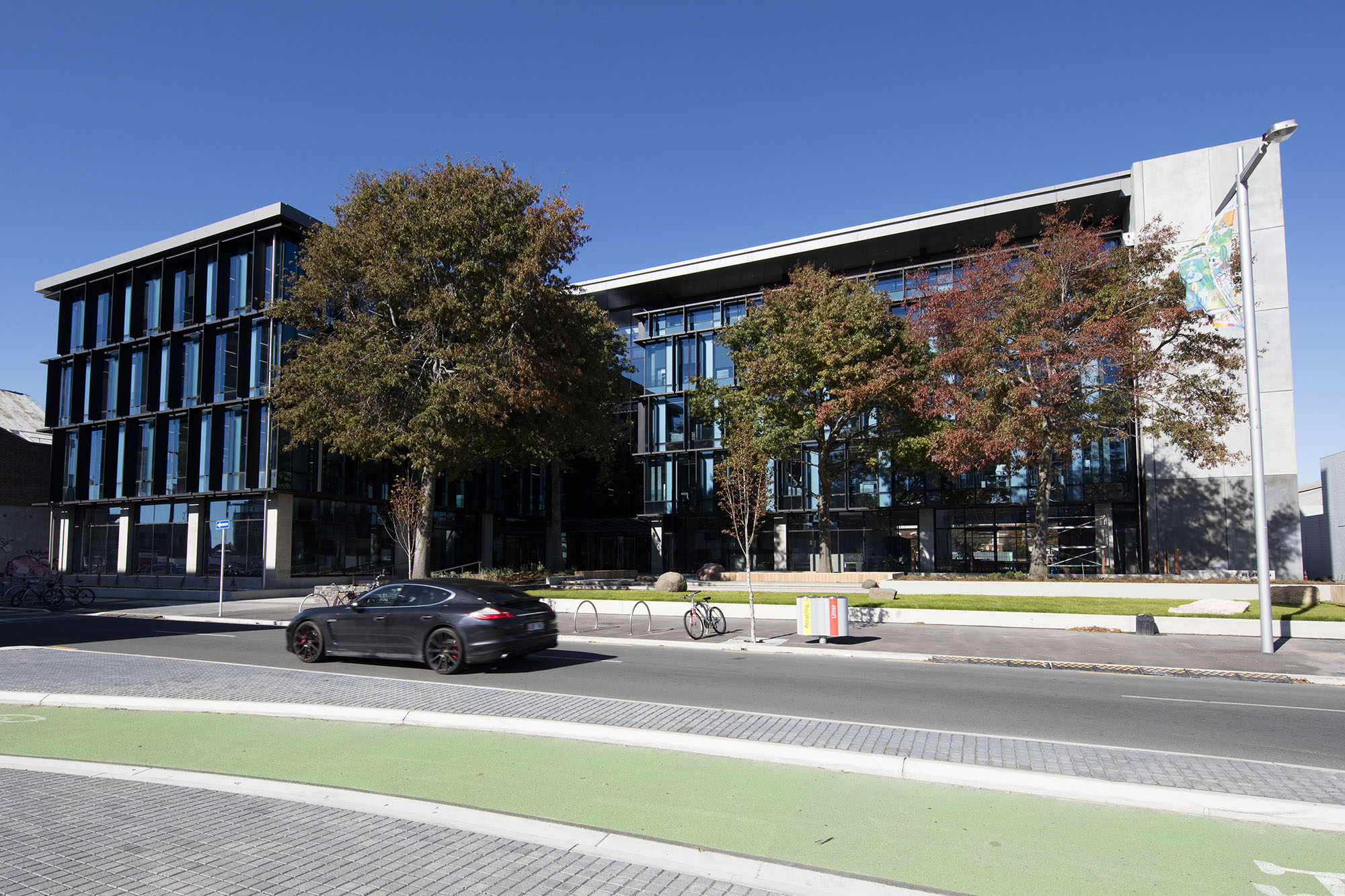
The main office of Environment Canterbury on Tuam Street in Christchurch

Environment Canterbury's main office is at 200 Tuam Street Christchurch in an environmentally friendly building designed and built to house the regional council's 500 Christchurch-based staff. The old building was demolished in 2011 after the Christchurch earthquake. All staff moved into the new building on 18 April 2016. ECan also has smaller offices in Timaru, Ashburton, and Kaikōura.

== Governance ==
From its creation until May 2010, Canterbury Regional Council was governed by 14 elected councillors who were elected on a first-past-the-post basis from eight regional constituencies. The inaugural chairperson was Richard Johnson, who led the councillors from November 1989 until he retired at the 2004 local elections.

=== Councillors (2001–2004) ===
In the 2001 local elections, nine constituencies were used: North Canterbury, Christchurch North, Christchurch East, Christchurch South, Christchurch West (all two members each), Selwyn-Banks Peninsula, Ashburton, South Canterbury, and Waitaki (all one member each). The candidates from the Ashburton and Waitaki constituencies were declared elected without opposition. The 14 council members were:

- Robert Johnston
- Ross Little
- Ian Robertson
- Judy Waters
- Richard Budd
- Valerie Campbell
- Kerry Burke
- Diana Shand
- Neil Cherry (Christchurch West; resigned late 2002 or early 2003)
- Peter Yeoman (Christchurch West; died October 2002)
- Richard Johnson
- Angus McKay
- Mark Oldfield
- Bill Penno
- Alec Neill (Christchurch West; won by-election in April 2003)
- Nicky Wagner (Christchurch West; won by-election in April 2003)

Yeoman died in October 2002. Cherry resigned during the term and died in May 2003. Both were from the Christchurch West constituency and the by-election caused by Yeoman's death was held over so that both positions could be filled at the same time. The by-election was won by Alec Neill and Nicky Wagner in April 2003.

=== Councillors (2004–2007) ===
In the 2004 local elections, nine constituencies were used: North Canterbury, Christchurch North, Christchurch East, Christchurch South, Christchurch West (all two members each), Banks Peninsula & Selwyn, Ashburton, South Canterbury, and Waitaki (all one member each).

- Kerry Burke (chair; Christchurch South)
- Robert Johnston (deputy chair, North Canterbury)
- Mark Oldfield (South Canterbury)
- Angus McKay (Ashburton)
- Bill Woods (Banks Peninsula and Selwyn)
- Elizabeth Cunningham (Christchurch East)
- Richard Budd (Christchurch East)
- Judy Waters (Christchurch North)
- Anne Carroll (Christchurch North)
- Bob Kirk (Christchurch South)
- Alec Neill (Christchurch West)
- Nicky Wagner (Christchurch West)
- Ross Little (North Canterbury)

=== Councillors (2007–2010) ===
In the 2007 local elections, eight constituencies were used: North Canterbury, Christchurch North, Christchurch East, Christchurch South, Christchurch West, South Canterbury (all two members each), Selwyn Banks Peninsula, and Rakaia (both one member each). In Rakaia, incumbent councillor Angus McKay was returned without opposition. Four new regional councillors were elected on platforms promoting better management of water resources and opposition to the Central Plains Water scheme. The four were: David Sutherland and Rik Tindall, who stood as "Save Our Water" candidates, and independent candidates Jane Demeter and Eugenie Sage. The following members made up the regional council:

- Kerry Burke (chairman until 24 September 2009; Christchurch South)
- Angus McKay (Rakaia)
- Mark Oldfield (South Canterbury)
- Bronwen Murray (South Canterbury)
- Eugenie Sage (Selwyn-Banks Peninsula)
- Ross Little (North Canterbury)
- Jo Kane (North Canterbury)
- Carole Evans (Christchurch North)
- Jane Demeter (Christchurch North)
- Pat Harrow (Christchurch West)
- Alec Neill (chairman from 24 September 2009; Christchurch West)
- David Sutherland (Christchurch East)
- Rik Tindall (Christchurch East)
- Bob Kirk (Christchurch South)

On 24 September 2009, Alec Neill became chairman after the previous chairman, Sir Kerry Burke, lost a motion of no confidence adopted eight votes for to six against from the other councillors. Burke remained a regional councillor Burke had been re-elected chairperson in October 2007. The councillors' vote was initially tied between Burke and Alec Neill. Burke had been an elected councillor since 1998 and was chairman from 2004.

=== Commissioners (2010–2016) ===
In March 2010, following an investigation and report by Wyatt Creech, the National Government sacked the Environment Canterbury councillors and replaced them with commissioners:

- Margaret Bazley (Chair)
- Hon. David Caygill (Deputy Chair)
- David Bedford
- Donald Couch (until 2014), replaced by Elizabeth Cunningham
- Tom Lambie
- Professor Peter Skelton
- Rex Williams

The commissioners held their first public meeting on 6 May 2010. The National Government initially promised a return to elected councillors with the local elections in October 2013. In September 2012, this was revised for commissioners to stay until the October 2016 local elections. Donald Couch resigned in April 2015 as he was to move to Canada and in August 2015, he was replaced by Elizabeth Cunningham.

In March 2014, a statutory review in ECan was begun, and the National Government released a public discussion document in March 2015 outlining a proposal for the regional council's future, with a stated preference for a mixed model of seven elected members and six members appointed by the Government. Nick Smith, as Minister for the Environment, stated that "it may be appropriate to consider these options beyond 2019". Louise Upston, as Associate Minister for Local Government, justified the mixed model as it "could provide the necessary stability for Canterbury from 2016". Former district councillor and now member of parliament Sage criticised the government backdown as denying Cantabrians the right to make their own decisions. Artist Sam Mahon, who is a strong opponent of the sacking of the councillors, gave his opinion as the proposal presenting "just status quo, that gives the perception of democracy".

Smith confirmed the mixed model in July 2015, with seven councillors to be elected in 2016 alongside six appointed commissioners, with a return to a fully elected council in 2019.

=== Mixed governance body (2016–2019) ===
For the 2016 local elections, the government allowed seven members to be elected with six appointed commissioners. For the local elections, there were four constituencies: Christchurch (4 members), North Canterbury, Mid-Canterbury, and South Canterbury (1 member each). Peter Scott was declared elected unopposed for South Canterbury. Two of the existing commissioners retired (Bazley and Williams), with Bedford, Caygill, Cunningham, Lambie and Skelton reappointed. Iaean Cranwell was a new commissioner, with him and Cunningham appointed on the recommendation of Ngāi Tahu. Bedford became chairman but resigned in 2017 due to ill health. Steve Lowndes, who was initially deputy chairman, was elected as chairman in November 2017, with Peter Scott his deputy.

The councillors and commissioners for the 2016 to 2019 period were as follows:

- David Bedford (chair and commissioner, resigned September 2017)
- Steve Lowndes (deputy chair, Christchurch, elected chairman in November 2017)
- Peter Scott (South Canterbury, elected deputy chairman in November 2017)
- David Caygill (commissioner)
- Iaean Cranwell (commissioner)
- Rod Cullinane (Christchurch)
- Elizabeth Cunningham (commissioner)
- Thomas Lambie (commissioner)
- Claire McKay (North Canterbury)
- Lan Pham (Christchurch)
- Cynthia Roberts (Christchurch)
- Peter Skelton (commissioner)
- John Sunckell (Mid-Canterbury)

=== Councillors (2019–2022) ===
The composition of the board following the 2019 local elections was:

- Jenny Hughey (chair) – Christchurch North East, The People's Choice
- Peter Scott (deputy chair) – South Canterbury, Independent
- Ian Mackenzie – Mid-Canterbury, Independent
- John Sunckell – Mid-Canterbury, Independent
- Elizabeth McKenzie – South Canterbury, Independent
- Vicky Southworth – Christchurch South, Independent for Positive Change
- Phil Clearwater – Christchurch South, The People's Choice-Labour
- Claire McKay – North Canterbury, Independent
- Grant Edge – North Canterbury, Independent
- Megan Hands – Christchurch West, Independent
- Craig Pauling – Christchurch West, The People's Choice
- Tane Apanui – Christchurch North East, Rail and Water
- Lan Pham – Christchurch Central, The Common Good-Independent
- Nicole Marshall – Christchurch Central, Labour-The People's Choice

=== Councillors (2022–2025) ===
The current composition of the board following the 2022 local elections is:

Name	Affiliation (if any)	Regional constituency
Grant Edge	Independent	North Canterbury/Ōpukepuke
Claire McKay	Independent	North Canterbury/Ōpukepuke
Greg Byrnes	Independent	Christchurch Central/Ōhoko
Genevieve Robinson	Independent	Christchurch Central/Ōhoko
Joe Davies	The People's Choice – Labour	Christchurch North East/Ōrei
David East	Independent	Christchurch North East/Ōrei
Paul Dietsche	Get Things Done	Christchurch South/Ōwhanga
Vicky Southworth	Independent	Christchurch South/Ōwhanga
Craig Pauling	The People's Choice	Christchurch West/Ōpuna
Deon Swiggs	Independent	Christchurch West/Ōpuna
Ian Mackenzie	Independent	Mid Canterbury/Ōpākihi
John Sunckell	Independent	Mid Canterbury/Ōpākihi
Peter Scott	Independent	South Canterbury/Ōtuhituhi
Nick Ward	Independent	South Canterbury/Ōtuhituhi

On 3 May 2024, Cr Peter Scott stepped down from his position Environment Canterbury's chair after admitting he was illegally irrigating part of his South Canterbury farm during a Newstalk ZB radio interview. Environment Canterbury commissioned an independent investigation into Scott's activities. Cr Craig Pauling became acting chair following Scott's resignation. Scott resumed his role as chair in July, but stepped down again in September after it was revealed he had exceeded the speed limit 678 times in his council-provided car since January.

=== Chief executive ===
Stefanie Rixecker was appointed Chief Executive in August 2020, taking over from Bill Bayfield who took up the position in June 2011. Dr. Bryan Jenkins was the chief executive from June 2003.

== Regional parks ==
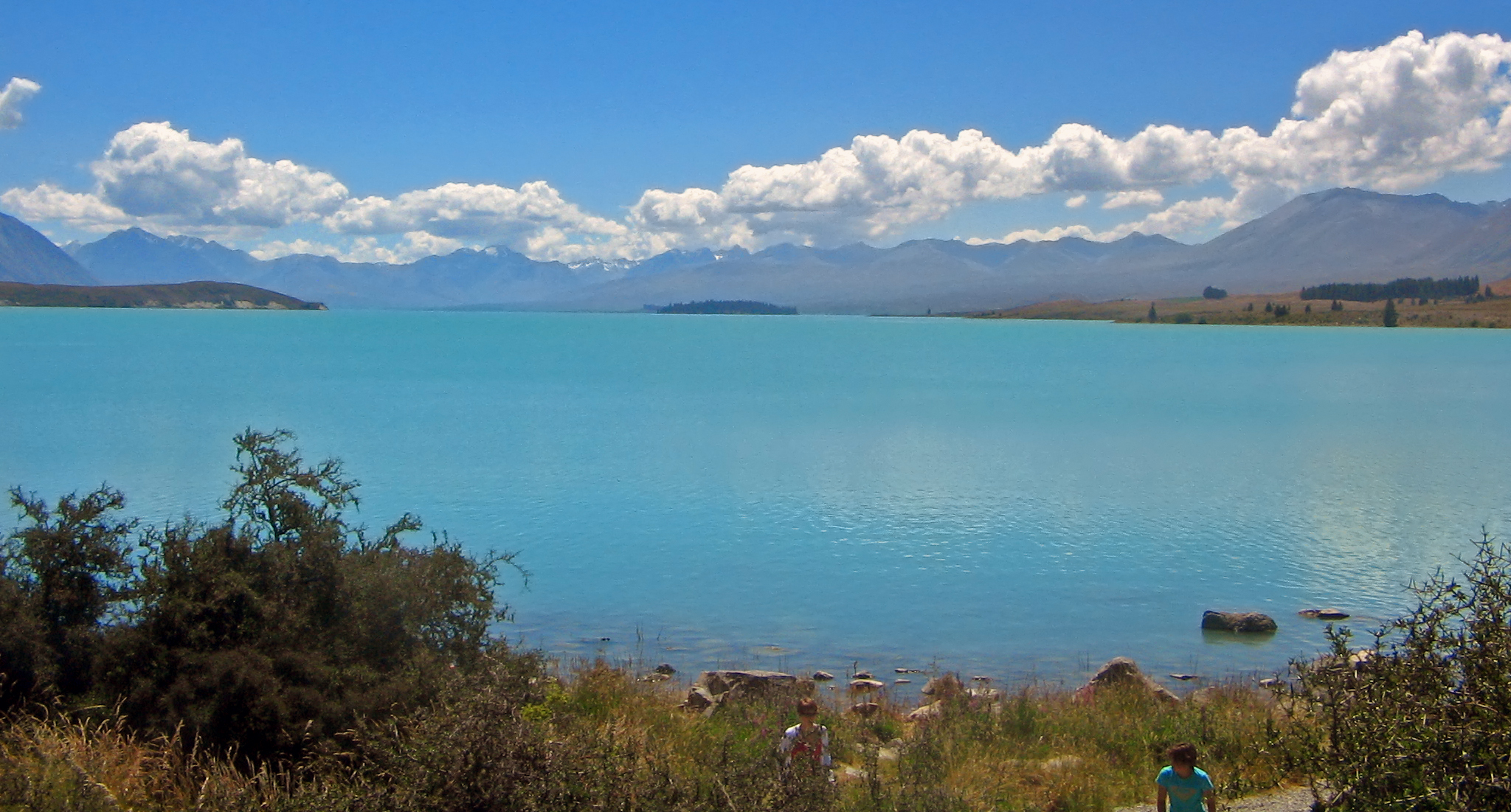
Lake Tekapo Regional Park

The council operates four regional parks.

- Ashley Rakahuri Regional Park
- Northern Pegasus Bay
- Lake Tekapo Regional Park
- Waimakariri River Regional Park

== Regional Policy Statement ==
The Canterbury Regional Policy Statement became operative in 1998.

In 2006, a mandatory 10-year review of the Regional Policy Statement commenced.

== Regional Plans and Water Conservation Orders ==
Canterbury has the following 'operative' regional plans.

- The Natural Resources Regional Plan (NRRP)
- Canterbury Regional Council Transitional Regional Plan, October 1991.
- Transitional Regional Plan for Nelson-Marlborough Region
- Waimakariri River Regional Plan
- Opihi River Regional Plan
- Waitaki Catchment Water Allocation Regional Plan

The Natural Resources Regional Plan (PNRRP) proceeded in two stages. Chapters 1 to 3 (Overview, Ngai Tahu and Air Quality) were publicly notified in June 2002. Chapters 4–8 were publicly notified in July 2004. Chapters 1 to 3 were decided on in September 2007 and some aspects of this large and detailed plan were appealed to the Environment Court. Hearings into Chapters 4–8 started in late 2007 and continued throughout 2008. The Canterbury Natural Resources Regional Plan chapters on Ngai Tahu and natural resources, air quality, water quality, water quantity, beds of lakes and rivers, wetlands and soil conservation were operative from 11 June 2011, replacing the older Canterbury Regional Council Transitional Regional Plan (October 1991), which was a collection of rules and bylaws predating the Resource Management Act 1991, and was the operative plan for most of the region, except the Waitaki catchment and the Kaikōura area.

There are also four Water Conservation Orders (WCOs) that apply in Canterbury: the Rakaia River WCO, the Lake Ellesmere (Te Waihora) WCO, the Rangitata WCO and the Ahuriri River WCO.

== Resource consents ==
Consents Backlog to 30 June 2011.

Canterbury Regional Council issues and supervises the most resource consents under the Resource Management Act 1991 of any of the 16 regional councils in New Zealand. In the year ended 30 June 2006, Environment Canterbury processed 3,381 applications, more than double the number processed by any other consent authority (Environment Waikato had the next highest number; 1,384 applications in 2006). By January 2005, Canterbury Regional Council had issued over 14,000 resource consents. The conditions of individual consents can be viewed on line by using the six-digit "CRC" number.

In October 2004, Canterbury Regional Council had a 'backlog' of unprocessed applications due largely to the notification of applications to take groundwater in highly allocated groundwater zones.

The 'backlog' or number of applications for consents being processed, is recorded daily on the Environment Canterbury web site. An upward trend appears to have ended in the middle of 2008, with numbers unprocessed slowly declining into 2009. The sharp increase in applications in June 2007 was due to the review of 400 existing resource consents in the Rakaia-Selwyn groundwater allocation zone.

== Criticism ==
Canterbury Regional Council received the lowest rating given by rural ratepayers in a Federated Farmers survey on local authorities. The grade took into account the council's level of approachability, degree of bias, provision of roads, value for money, and implementation of the RMA.

In October 2009 the Government announced a review of ECan under Section 24A of the Resource Management Act. The reason cited was that a delay in processing resource consents "is holding the Canterbury region back". In March 2010, after the release of the "Creech Report" the government chose to appoint a panel of commissioners to replace the elected Councillors, as described above.

== See also ==
- Provinces of New Zealand
- Territorial Authorities of New Zealand
- Water pollution in Canterbury
