= Canterbury Interior Main Line =

Proposed railway line in New Zealand

The Canterbury Interior Main Line was a proposed railway line that would have linked many of the branch lines in the Canterbury region of New Zealand's South Island. Although it was never built in full, its most northerly portion was constructed.

== The proposal ==
The proposal was created and developed in the 1870s and 1880s as branch lines began to fan out from the then under-construction Main North Line and Main South Line (which together form the South Island Main Trunk Railway). These lines ran from coastal centres inland and were intended to provide better communication and transport for young, fledgling communities and to open up parts of Canterbury for greater, more intensive economic activity – mainly agriculture. The Canterbury Interior Main Line proposal intended to link these branch lines together. It was to leave the Main North Line in Rangiora, head inland to Oxford and Sheffield and then link a number of branch lines at or near their termini before returning to the coast and joining the Main South Line in Temuka, just north of Timaru.

The lines linked would have been:

- Oxford Branch – the route inland from Rangiora
- Eyreton Branch – it was connected to the Oxford Branch
- Midland Line – then known as the Malvern Branch, it terminated in Malvern (now known as Sheffield)
- Whitecliffs Branch – to meet it in Homebush
- Methven Branch
- Mount Somers Branch

== The constructed portion ==
On 21 June 1875, the Oxford Branch was completed to Oxford, and construction soon began on a link across the Waimakariri Gorge to Sheffield. A Royal Commission of New Zealand's railways in 1880 recommended the early completion of this link to Sheffield, and despite the Long Depression, it was finished and opened on 28 July 1884. This was seen as the first portion of the Canterbury Interior Main Line, and although the 1880 Royal Commission disapproved of the proposal, it remained on the table for a number of years. However, increasing usage of road transport in the early 20th century began to impact the number of passengers and freight carried by rail and the economic viability of any interior main line sharply declined and the proposal disappeared. By 1930, it was clearly accepted that the proposal would never come to fruition, as evidenced by the closure of the Oxford to Sheffield link on 14 July 1930. The rest of the Oxford Branch closed on 19 April 1959.
