= Waddington, New Zealand =

Settlement in Canterbury, New Zealand

Waddington
- Village
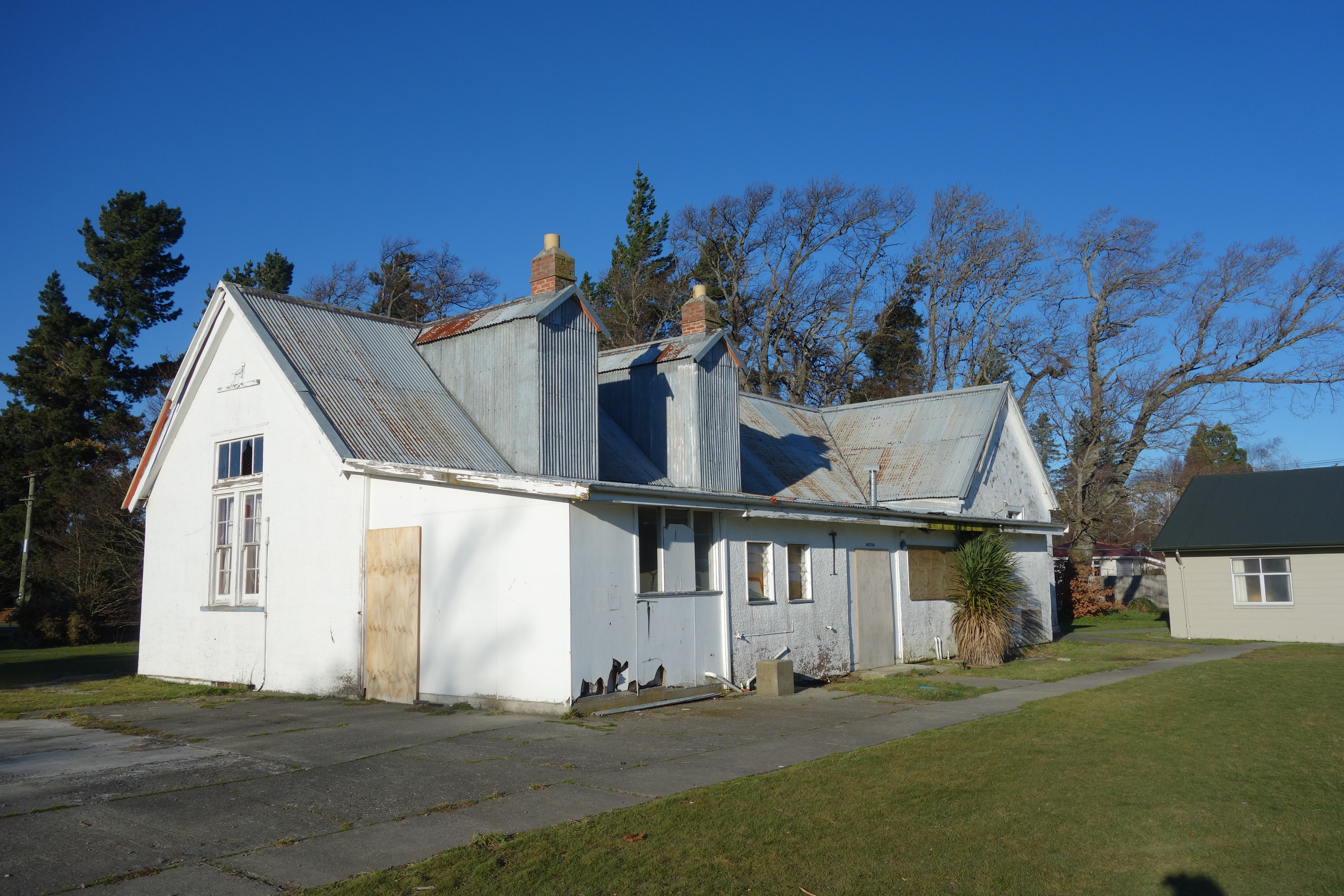
- The former Waddington School
- Interactive map of Waddington
- Coordinates: 43°23′50″S 172°2′0″E
- Country: New Zealand
- Region: Canterbury
- Territorial authority: Selwyn District
- Ward: Malvern
- Community: Malvern
- Electorates: Selwyn; Te Tai Tonga (Māori)

Government
  - Territorial Authority: Selwyn District Council
  - Regional council: Environment Canterbury
  - Mayor of Selwyn: Lydia Gliddon
  - Selwyn MP: Nicola Grigg
  - Te Tai Tonga MP: Tākuta Ferris

Area
  - Total: 1.08 km^{2} (0.42 sq mi)

Population (2023 Census)
  - Total: 141
  - Density: 131/km^{2} (338/sq mi)
- Time zone: UTC+12 (New Zealand Standard Time)
  - Summer (DST): UTC+13 (New Zealand Daylight Time)
- Postcode: 7500
- Area code: 03

Waddington is a small village located in the Selwyn District of the Canterbury region of New Zealand's South Island, near the Waimakariri Gorge.

== Description ==
Waddington was named by and for William Waddington, who purchased part of the Homebush run that had previously been held by John Deans, and laid out the township in 1873.

Waddington has a close association with its neighbouring village Sheffield, which is 1 kilometre (0.62 mi) further north-west along State Highway 73. The two villages share a community committee.

The two villages are located between Darfield and Springfield on both State Highway 73 and the Midland Line railway. The towns were settled in the 19th century by farmers attracted to the area because of its suitability for sheep grazing.

Waddington is situated at the intersection of three major roads (two of them popular tourist roads) that service the inland regions of Canterbury, including the Inland Scenic Route and the Great Alpine Highway / State Highway 73.

Waddington's cemetery was initially called the East Malvern Cemetery, but in 1880 the trust changed its name to Waddington Cemetery Trust. Its first burial was in 1882.

Waddington is also home to the St John Youth New Zealand South Island Training Camp.

== Demographics ==
Sheffield and Waddington are described by Statistics New Zealand as a rural settlement. They cover 1.63 km^{2} (0.63 sq mi) and had an estimated population of 350 as of June 2025, with a population density of 215 people per km^{2}. They are part of the statistical area of Torlesse. Waddington covers 1.08 km^{2} (0.42 sq mi).

Historical population
Year	Pop.	±% p.a.
2006	123	—
2013	144	+2.28%
2018	150	+0.82%
2023	141	−1.23%
The 2006 population is for a smaller area of 0.23 km^{2}. Source:

Waddington had a population of 141 in the 2023 New Zealand census, a decrease of 9 people (−6.0%) since the 2018 census, and a decrease of 3 people (−2.1%) since the 2013 census. There were 66 males and 78 females in 60 dwellings. 2.1% of people identified as LGBTIQ+. The median age was 48.4 years (compared with 38.1 years nationally). There were 24 people (17.0%) aged under 15 years, 12 (8.5%) aged 15 to 29, 81 (57.4%) aged 30 to 64, and 27 (19.1%) aged 65 or older.

People could identify as more than one ethnicity. The results were 95.7% European (Pākehā), 12.8% Māori, and 2.1% Asian. English was spoken by 97.9%, Māori by 2.1%, and other languages by 4.3%. No language could be spoken by 2.1% (e.g. too young to talk). The percentage of people born overseas was 14.9, compared with 28.8% nationally.

Religious affiliations were 31.9% Christian, and 2.1% other religions. People who answered that they had no religion were 61.7%, and 2.1% of people did not answer the census question.

Of those at least 15 years old, 21 (17.9%) people had a bachelor's or higher degree, 69 (59.0%) had a post-high school certificate or diploma, and 27 (23.1%) people exclusively held high school qualifications. The median income was $44,700, compared with $41,500 nationally. 12 people (10.3%) earned over $100,000 compared to 12.1% nationally. The employment status of those at least 15 was 63 (53.8%) full-time, 15 (12.8%) part-time, and 3 (2.6%) unemployed.
