= Oxford Branch (New Zealand) =

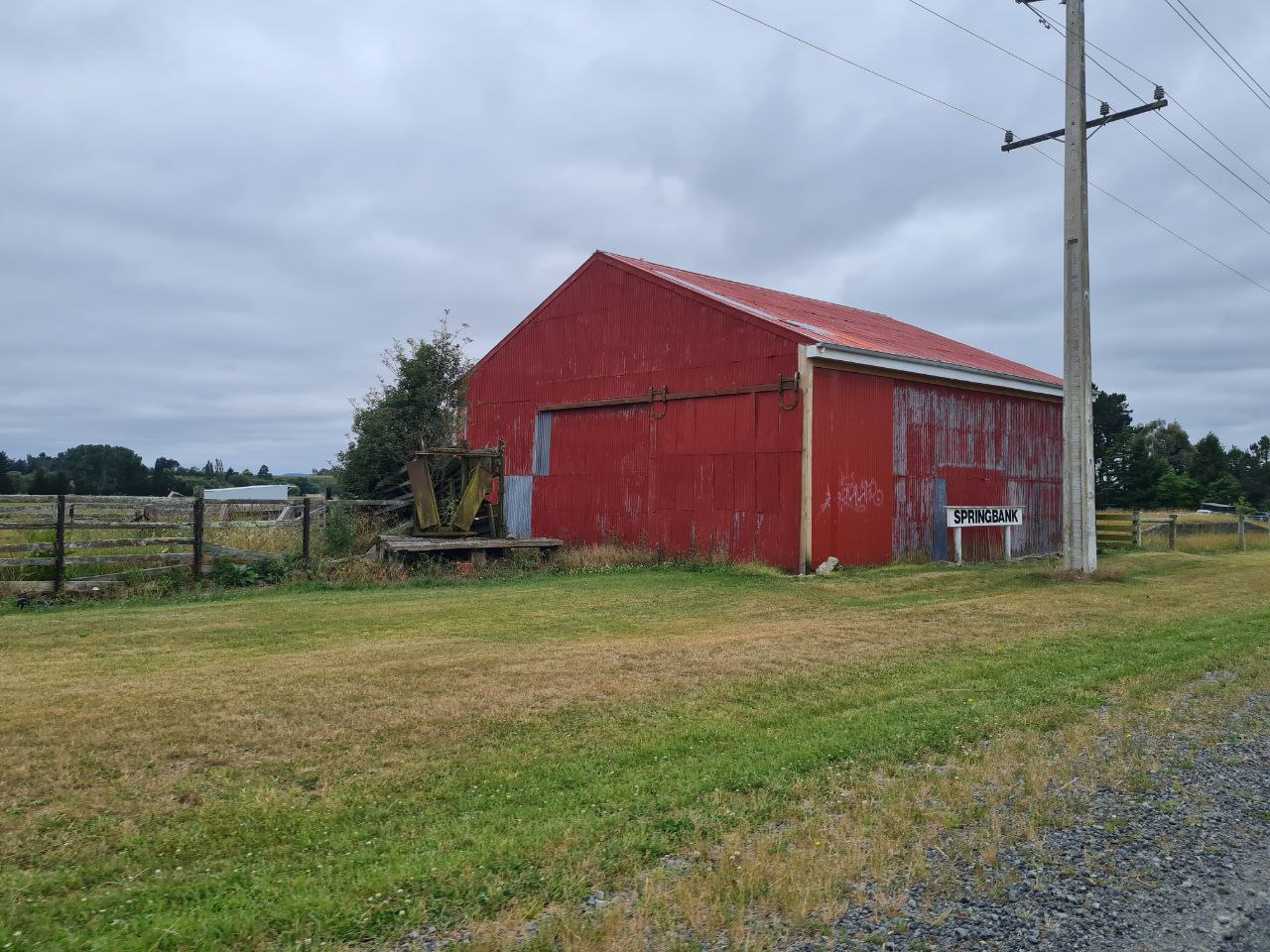
- Springbank engine shed and its station sign, December 2023

Overview
- Status: Closed
- Owner: Railways Department
- Locale: Canterbury, New Zealand
- Termini: Rangiora; Sheffield
- Stations: 13

Service
- Type: Heavy Rail
- System: New Zealand Government Railways (NZGR)
- Operator(s): Railways Department

History
- Opened: 28 July 1884
- Closed: 14 July 1930 (Sheffield – Oxford East); 19 April 1959 (Oxford East – Rangiora)

Technical
- Line length: 35.47 km (Rangiora – Oxford West)
- Number of tracks: Single
- Character: Rural
- Track gauge: 3 ft 6 in (1,067 mm)

Map

The Oxford Branch was a branch line railway that formed part of New Zealand's national rail network. It was located in the Canterbury region of the South Island, and ran roughly parallel with the Eyreton Branch that was located some ten kilometres south. It opened to Oxford in 1875 and survived until 1959.

It was unusual in that for much of its life it linked two main lines, the Main North Line and the Midland Line, the only portion of the proposed Canterbury Interior Main Line to be completed.

== Construction ==
In the late 1860s, the Oxford region had poor transport, and as it had one of Canterbury's two major stands of timber (the Little River Branch was built to the other) it was seen as economically important to build a branch line to transport the timber. The Main North Line up the east coast from Christchurch was under construction and a number of proposals were made of routes from the mainline to Oxford. Two proposals were accepted, from Rangiora to Oxford and from Kaiapoi to West Eyreton (the Eyreton Branch).

Construction was undertaken by central government even though the Canterbury Provincial Railways were building the Main North Line, and work began in mid-1872, four months before the mainline reached Rangiora. The mainline was being built to 1,600 mm (5 ft 3 in) while the branch was the newly nationally accepted 1,067 mm (3 ft 6 in) narrow gauge, and this created a break of gauge in Rangiora for a brief period until the Canterbury Provincial Railways were converted to narrow gauge.

On 1 December 1874, the branch was opened from Rangiora to Cust, and to Oxford on 21 June 1875 with two stations in Oxford, East and West: East Oxford was considered to be the main station. In early 1877, the Public Works Department decided to extend the Eyreton Branch to the Oxford Branch at Bennetts Junction, opened on 1 February 1878. An extension of the Oxford Branch soon followed, despite the Long Depression of the 1880s and the disapproval of a Royal Commission in 1880, to Sheffield, then known as Malvern and the terminus of a branch line that became the Midland Line. This opened on 28 July 1884 with its most notable engineering feat being a combined road/rail bridge over the Waimakariri Gorge. At this stage, the branch from Kaiapoi to Sheffield was seen as the most northerly portion of the proposed Canterbury Interior Main Line, but it was the only portion to be built.

== Operation ==
From its opening, the branch saw two mixed trains each way per day and a locomotive depot was established in Oxford. Once the connection with the Eyreton Branch was established, one daily train ran to Oxford from that line too. The trip from Christchurch to Oxford took three hours, including an hour and 40 minutes from Rangiora to the terminus. The extension from Oxford to Sheffield saw only light local traffic, and its sole moment of significant worth came during World War I. The war stimulated enough traffic to justify two trains daily, but with the coming of peace trains fell to a single weekly service. Had the Midland Line and Main North Line both been completed earlier, the route could have become a convenient shortcut and bypass of Christchurch from the West Coast to northern east coast destinations, but it mainly carried picnic trains and small quantities of local goods. Only one locomotive at a time was allowed on the bridge over the Waimakariri River despite its good condition, though it is doubtful this policy ever had to be enforced. Lacklustre traffic meant that the line was cut back to Oxford on 14 July 1930, reducing the branch's length to 35.5 kilometres.

Also in 1930, a Royal Commission determined that only one freight train daily from Christchurch to Oxford was required, and the New Zealand Railways Department acted upon this recommendations. West Oxford's locomotive depot was closed, and on 9 February 1931 the branch became goods only and the link from the Eyreton Branch was closed. Services remained daily until 1945, when they were cut to twice weekly. With financial losses increasing and traffic decreasing, the branch closed on 19 April 1959.

== Today ==
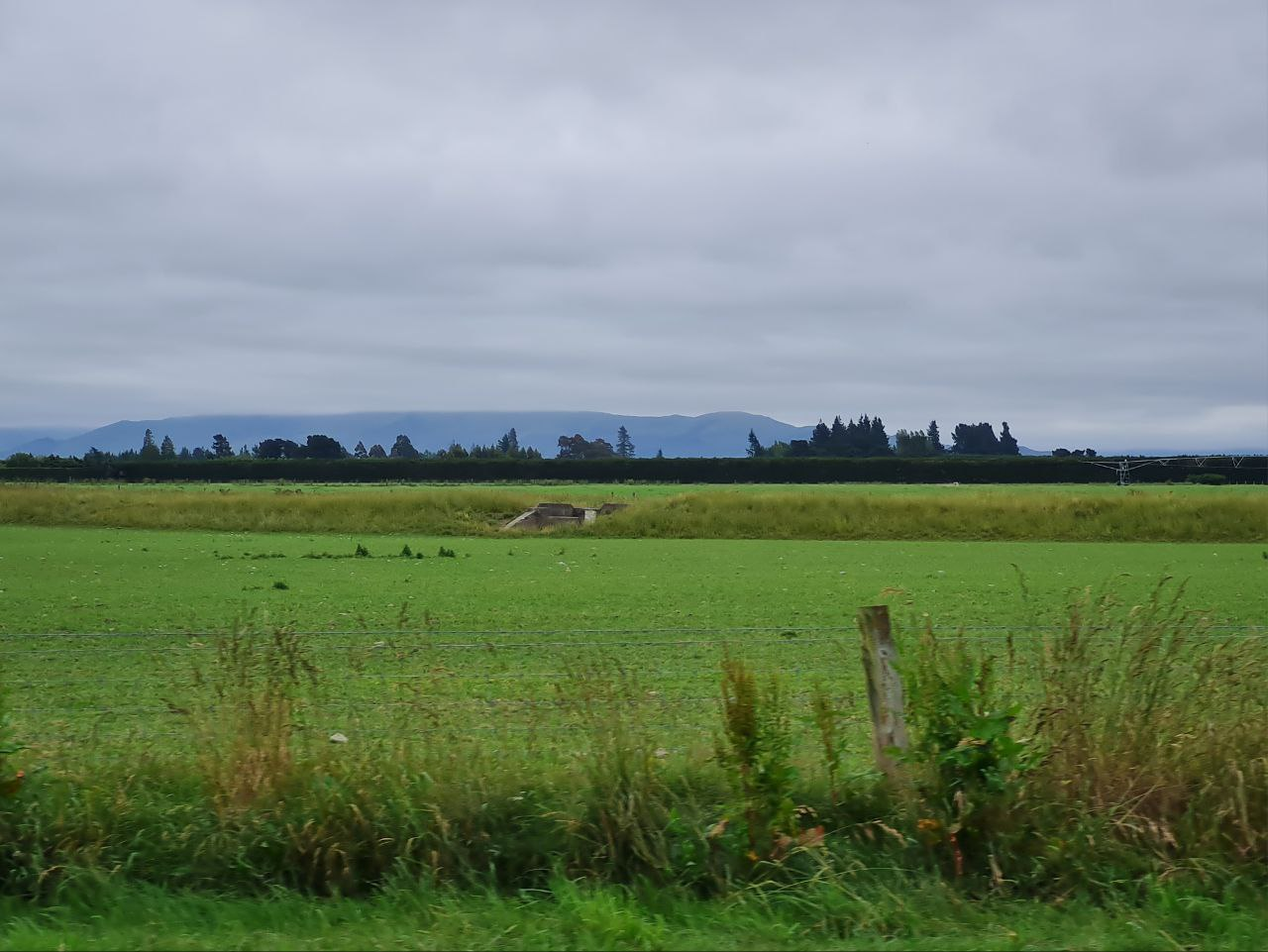
The embankment and an abutment of a bridge on the final section of track bed coming into Sheffield.

The bridge over the Waimakariri River still carries the road, performing half of its original function as a road/rail bridge. The road from Oxford approaches the bridge along the railway alignment as it took a much easier route than the original road; the old winding road route is visible from the current road. The railway's track bed is sometimes still visible, especially around the Waimakariri Gorge area, and in Rangiora the extra width of Blackett Street reveals the route. Loading banks still exist at the sites of Bennetts Junction and Carleton stations; Fernside and Springbank both still have their goods sheds, loading banks, and stockyards; replica station signs can be found at a few sites of old stations; and until 1997 East Oxford station stood behind the Oxford Working Men's Club. It was relatively large for a rural New Zealand station and was once well preserved, but it fell into such a severe state of disrepair that it was demolished and all that remains are the almost indestructible station safe and the platform.
