= Sheffield, New Zealand =

Settlement in Canterbury, New Zealand

Sheffield
- Village
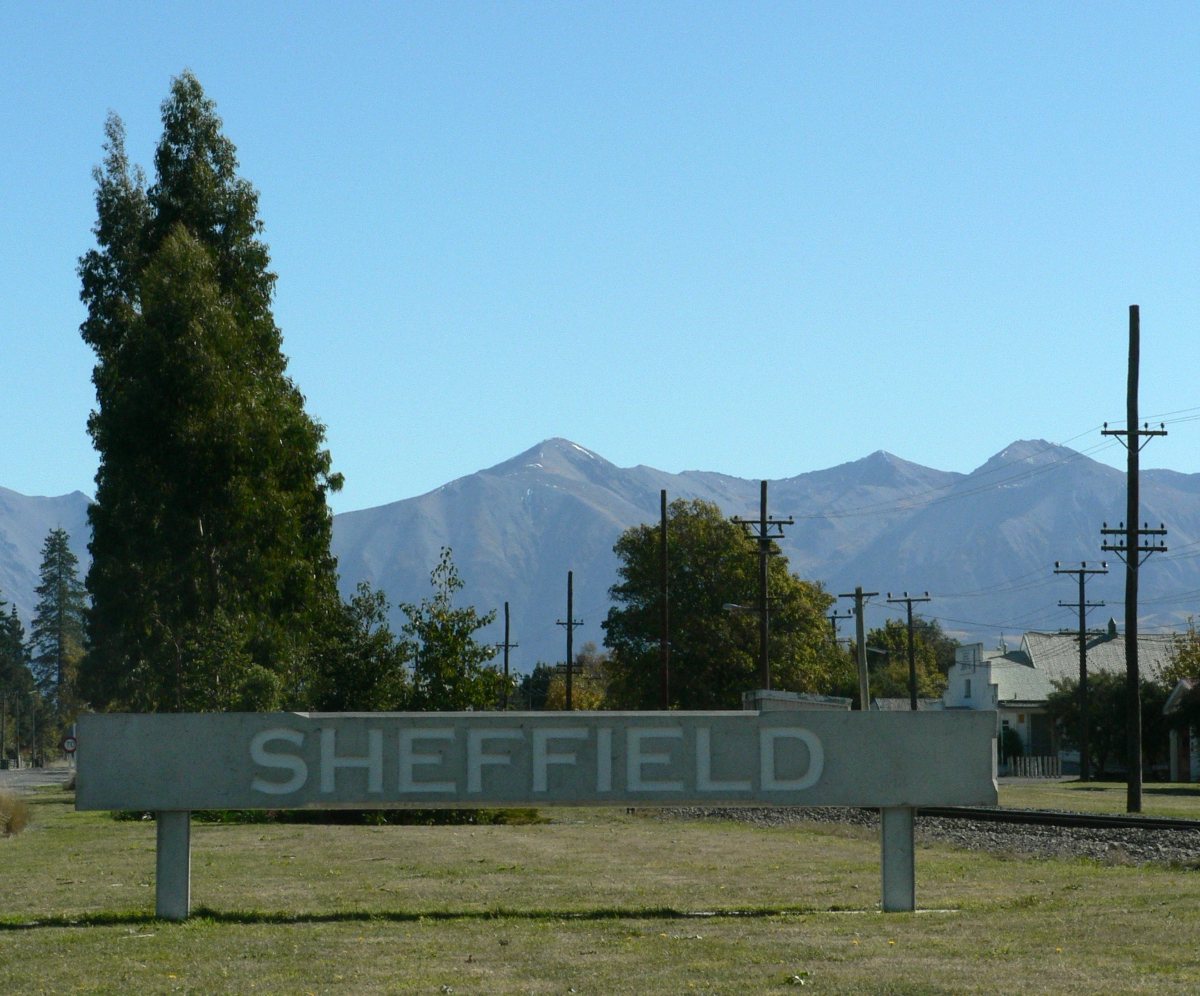
- Sign next to SH73 welcoming visitors to Sheffield
- Interactive map of Sheffield
- Coordinates: 43°23′S 172°1′E
- Country: New Zealand
- Region: Canterbury
- Territorial authority: Selwyn District
- Ward: Malvern
- Community: Malvern
- Electorates: Selwyn; Te Tai Tonga (Māori)

Government
  - Territorial Authority: Selwyn District Council
  - Regional council: Environment Canterbury
  - Mayor of Selwyn: Lydia Gliddon
  - Selwyn MP: Nicola Grigg
  - Te Tai Tonga MP: Tākuta Ferris

Area
  - Total: 0.55 km^{2} (0.21 sq mi)

Population (2023 Census)
  - Total: 198
  - Density: 360/km^{2} (930/sq mi)
- Time zone: UTC+12 (New Zealand Standard Time)
  - Summer (DST): UTC+13 (New Zealand Daylight Time)
- Postcode: 7500
- Area code: 03

Sheffield (formerly Malvern) is a small village located in the Selwyn District of the Canterbury region of New Zealand's South Island, near the Waimakariri Gorge.

Sheffield has a close association with its neighbouring village Waddington, which is 1 kilometre (0.62 mi) further south-east along State Highway 73. The two villages share a community committee.

The two villages are located between Darfield and Springfield on State Highway 73 and the Midland Line railway. The towns were settled in the 19th century by farmers attracted to the area for sheep grazing.

Sheffield was once a railway junction. The first railway line reached the town in the late 1870s from a junction in Darfield with the Whitecliffs Branch. This line, then known as the Malvern Branch line, grew to become the Midland Line between Christchurch and the West Coast. On 28 July 1884, the Oxford Branch was extended over the Waimakariri River to Sheffield, making the town a railway junction. Plans existed to continue this extension south from Sheffield as part of the proposed Canterbury Interior Main Line, but this never came to fruition and the rail link with Oxford closed on 14 July 1930. The railway station and goods shed are no longer present.

== Demographics ==
Sheffield and Waddington are described by Statistics New Zealand as a rural settlement. They cover 1.63 km^{2} (0.63 sq mi) and had an estimated population of 350 as of June 2025, with a population density of 215 people per km^{2}. They are part of the statistical area of Torlesse. Sheffield covers 0.55 km^{2} (0.21 sq mi).

Historical population
Year	Pop.	±% p.a.
2006	144	—
2013	150	+0.58%
2018	192	+5.06%
2023	198	+0.62%

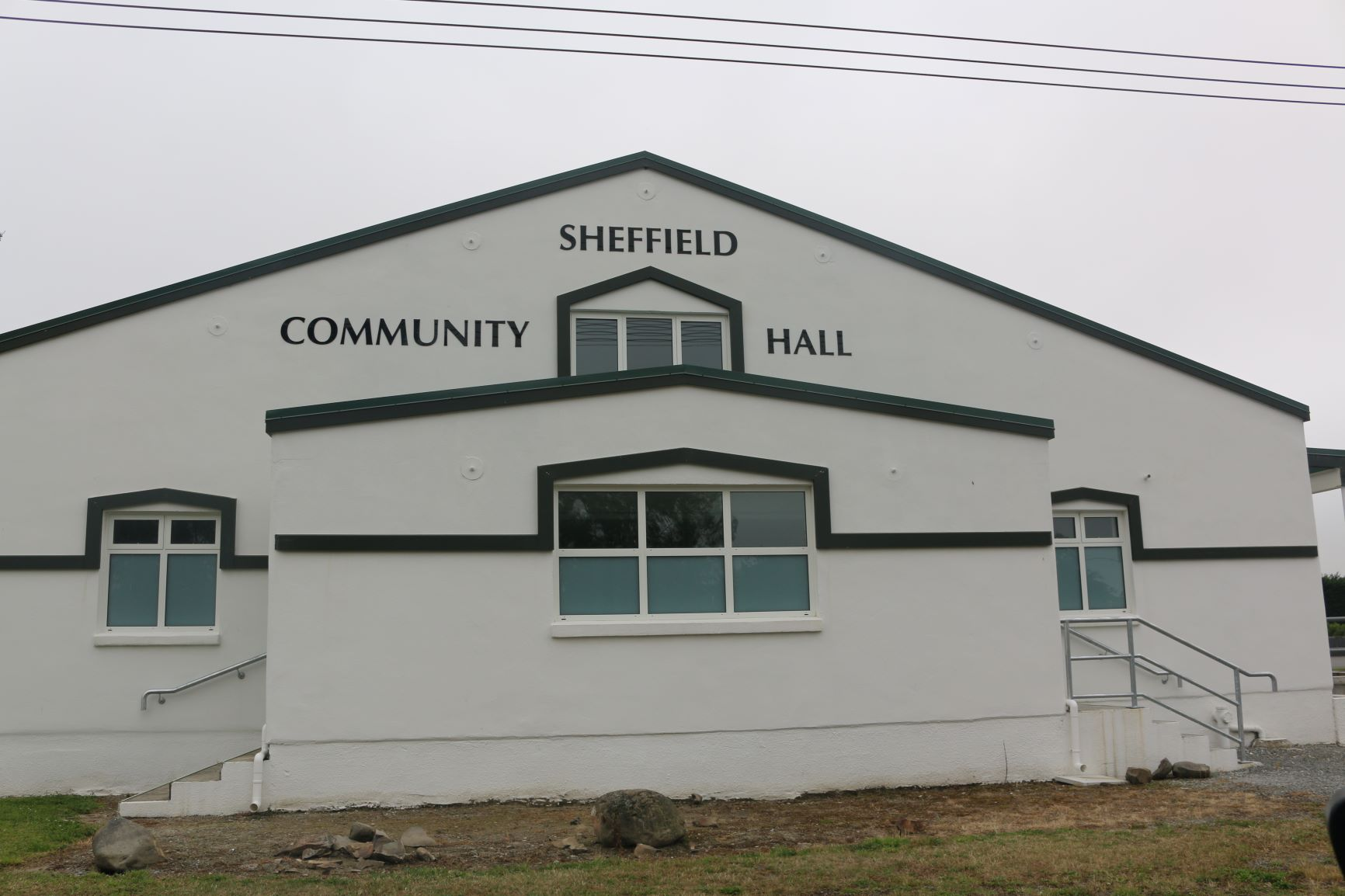
Sheffield Community Hall

Sheffield had a population of 198 in the 2023 New Zealand census, an increase of 6 people (3.1%) since the 2018 census, and an increase of 48 people (32.0%) since the 2013 census. There were 105 males and 93 females in 72 dwellings. 1.5% of people identified as LGBTIQ+. The median age was 39.4 years (compared with 38.1 years nationally). There were 42 people (21.2%) aged under 15 years, 27 (13.6%) aged 15 to 29, 99 (50.0%) aged 30 to 64, and 30 (15.2%) aged 65 or older.

People could identify as more than one ethnicity. The results were 92.4% European (Pākehā); 7.6% Māori; 3.0% Asian; 3.0% Middle Eastern, Latin American and African New Zealanders (MELAA); and 6.1% other, which includes people giving their ethnicity as "New Zealander". English was spoken by 98.5%, and other languages by 7.6%. No language could be spoken by 1.5% (e.g. too young to talk). New Zealand Sign Language was known by 1.5%. The percentage of people born overseas was 15.2, compared with 28.8% nationally.

Religious affiliations were 24.2% Christian, and 1.5% Hindu. People who answered that they had no religion were 63.6%, and 10.6% of people did not answer the census question.

Of those at least 15 years old, 33 (21.2%) people had a bachelor's or higher degree, 90 (57.7%) had a post-high school certificate or diploma, and 33 (21.2%) people exclusively held high school qualifications. The median income was $41,600, compared with $41,500 nationally. 9 people (5.8%) earned over $100,000 compared to 12.1% nationally. The employment status of those at least 15 was 96 (61.5%) full-time, 15 (9.6%) part-time, and 3 (1.9%) unemployed.

== Government ==
Sheffield is part of the Selwyn electorate. The Selwyn District Council provides local government services for Sheffield.

== Sheffield War Memorial ==
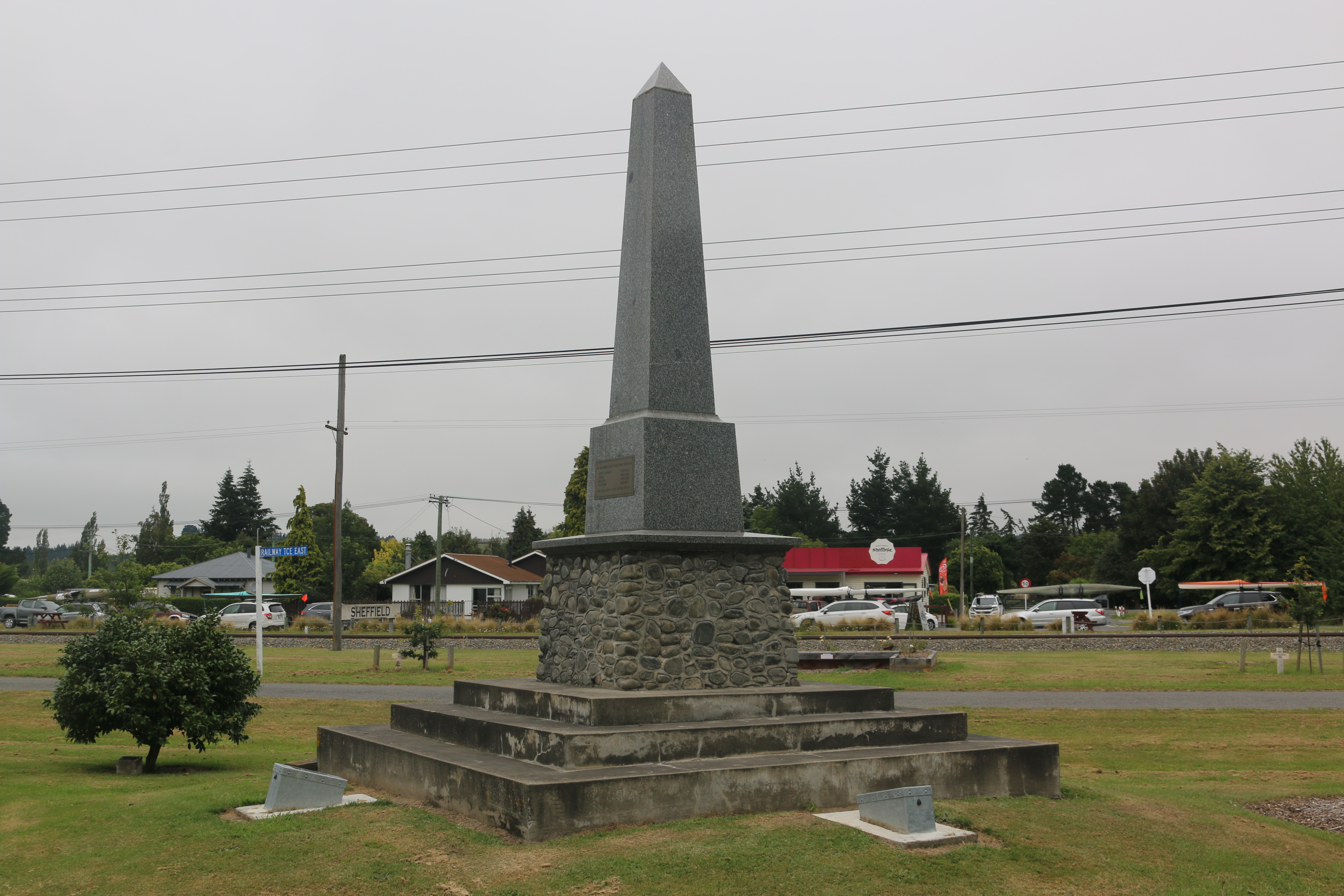
Sheffield War Memorial (2021)

The Sheffield community marked 100 years since the end of World War One by planting an oak tree for each of the 20 soldiers from the Sheffield area who lost their lives. The oaks were grown from acorns collected from the Gallipoli Oak which is next to the Bridge of Remembrance in Christchurch.

== Saint Ambrose's Anglican Church ==
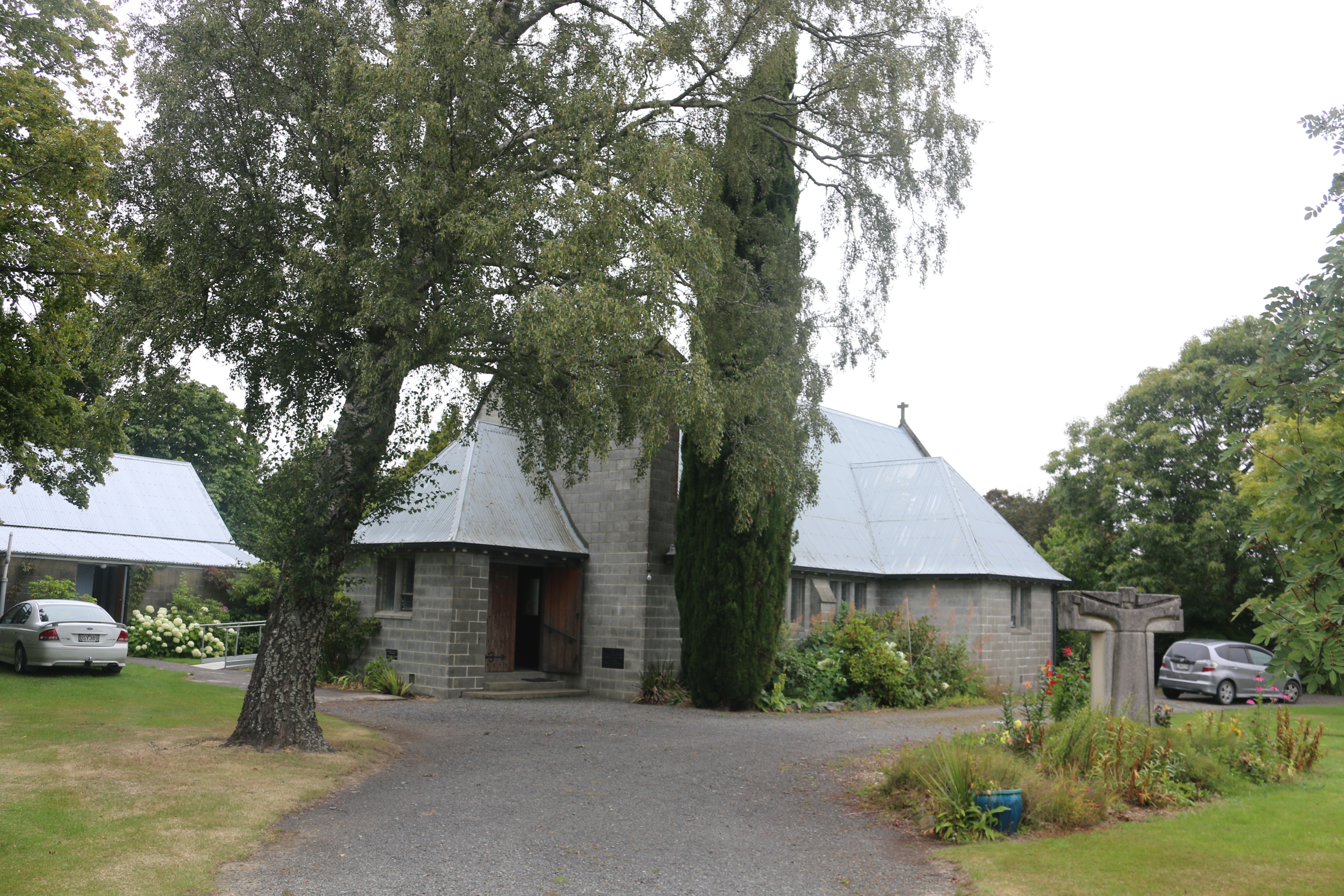
Saint Ambrose's Anglican Church (2021)

The original church was built in 1878. A decision to replace it occurred in 1939 and work started in 1955, but it was not until 26 August 1962 that it was finally consecrated.

== Sheffield Hotel ==
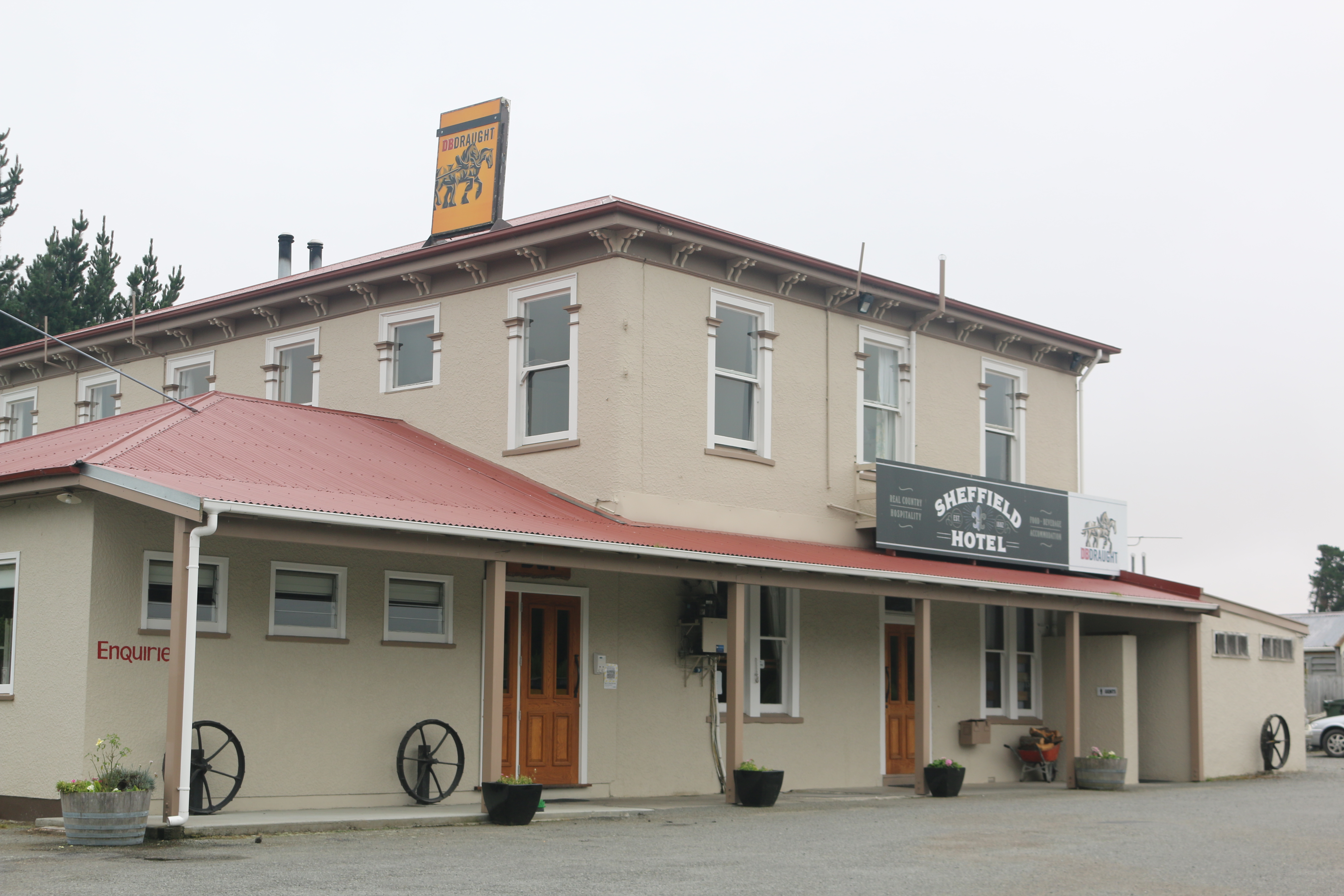
Sheffield Hotel (2021)

Originally built in 1882. In poor shape, the Sheffield Hotel was taken over by new owners in 2014 who revitalised it. The Sheffield Hotel was destroyed by a fire in September 2021. The sole occupant of the hotel was awoken in the middle of the night by smoke alarms and escaped safely.

== Education ==
Sheffield School is a contributing primary school catering for years 1 to 6. It had a roll of 89 as of July 2026. The school opened in 1949 as a consolidation of schools in Waddington, Russells Flat and Annat.
