= Sladden =

Sladden may also refer to:

== People ==
- Bernard Sladden (1879–1961), New Zealand farmer, wildlife ranger, historian and naturalist
- Eric Sladden (1936–2016), Australian rugby league player
- William Sladden (1882–1961), South Australian rower

== Other uses ==
- Sladden Wood, nature reserve in England
