= Eyreton Branch =

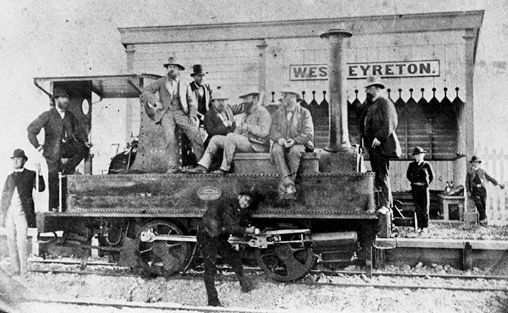
- West Eyreton railway station on opening day

Overview
- Other name: Wetheral Branch
- Status: Closed
- Owner: Railways Department
- Locale: Canterbury, New Zealand
- Termini: Kaiapoi; Bennetts Junction
- Stations: 10

Service
- Type: Heavy Rail
- System: New Zealand Government Railways (NZGR)
- Operator(s): Railways Department

History
- Opened: 17 December 1875
- Extended to Bennetts Junction: 1 February 1878
- Closed beyond Horrelville: 3 February 1931
- Closed beyond Wetheral: 26 May 1954
- Closed: April 1965

Technical
- Line length: 32.41 km (20.14 mi)
- Number of tracks: Single
- Character: Rural
- Track gauge: 3 ft 6 in (1,067 mm)

Map

The Eyreton Branch was a branch line railway that formed part of New Zealand's national rail network. Located in the Canterbury region of the South Island, it left the Main North Line in Kaiapoi and was built a mere ten kilometres south of the Oxford Branch. It opened in 1875 and operated until 1954, except for the first portion, which remained open until 1965.

Despite the implication of the branch's name, it passed north of Eyreton, though its original terminus was located in West Eyreton.

== Construction ==
At the start of the 1870s, a number of plans were made for a branch line from the Main North Line, then under construction, to Oxford. This was in response to the realities of the appalling communication and slow transport of the time. One plan, made in 1871, called for a line from Kaiapoi to Oxford, but this was seen as a threat to the interests of a proposed line from Rangiora to Oxford. Intense campaigning from groups in support of either line led to the government's decision to build two branches, one from Rangiora to Oxford and another from Kaiapoi to West Eyreton.

Despite warnings the line to West Eyreton would never be profitable, contracts for construction were let in 1873, and by 1875, construction was proceeding well, with the line opened to West Eyreton on 17 December 1875. This was intended to be the terminus of the branch, but in an attempt to make it profitable, work began the next year to link it with the Oxford Branch. This was completed on 1 February 1878 and linked West Eyreton with Bennetts Junction.

=== Break of Gauge ===
For a while, a break-of-gauge existed at the junction with the Main North Line in Kaiapoi. The Main North Line had been built with the Canterbury Provincial Railways' broad gauge of 1,600 mm (5 ft 3 in), while the Eyreton Branch was built to the then newly accepted national standard of 1,067 mm (3 ft 6 in) (internationally, a narrow gauge).

In 1876 provincial governments were abolished and Canterbury Provincial Railways were absorbed by the central government. By 1877 the Main North Line was converted to a gauge of 1,067 mm (3 ft 6 in) and the break-of-gauge was eliminated.

== Operation ==
For many years, the line was serviced by one service each way per day. These initially ran to West Eyreton, but with the opening of the link through to Bennetts Junction they ran right through to Oxford. From this time, much traffic carried on the Eyreton Branch was actually freight from Oxford using the Eyreton route as a shortcut to the Main North Line.

However, concerns that the line would not be profitable were fulfilled by low traffic volumes even before the era of widespread competition from the road. As road transport increased in competitiveness, freight dwindled. By 1927, only four services ran per week, and in 1930, a Royal Commission suggested that the line be closed unless locals wished to fund the line.

Nonetheless, the Railways Department kept operating the line, though on 9 February 1931 the link with Bennetts Junction on the Oxford Branch was closed. The Eyreton Branch did not revert to its previous terminus. Instead, five kilometres of the link with the Oxford Branch was retained, with the new terminus being Horrelville.

By 1950, only two trains a week ran, on Tuesdays and Thursdays. This in itself contributed to declining freight quantities, as wagons delivered on a Thursday would not be collected until the next week, an undesirably long delay for most businesses. The only real traffic along the line was generated by a flour mill in Wetheral. As traffic beyond it did not justify the line's existence, the line beyond Wetheral to Horrelville was closed on 26 May 1954 (operating more an industrial siding).

By April 1965, low traffic and deferred maintenance meant led to the closure of the remaining portion of the line from Wetheral back to Kaiapoi.

=== Passenger Services ===
Passenger traffic was catered for from the lines opening by way of mixed trains that carried both passengers and freight traffic. These continued until 9 February 1931 when passenger services were cancelled due to low patronage.

== Motive Power ==
The first train to West Eyreton was hauled by a diminutive A class tank steam locomotive. Later A class and A^{B} class tender engines became the usual motive power until the closure of the line.

== The branch today ==
Remnants of closed railways diminish and disappear over time due to natural and human activity, and little of note remains of the Eyreton Branch. Modern-day roads closely follow the route of the railway and its formation is often visible. Loading banks can be found at the former stations of:

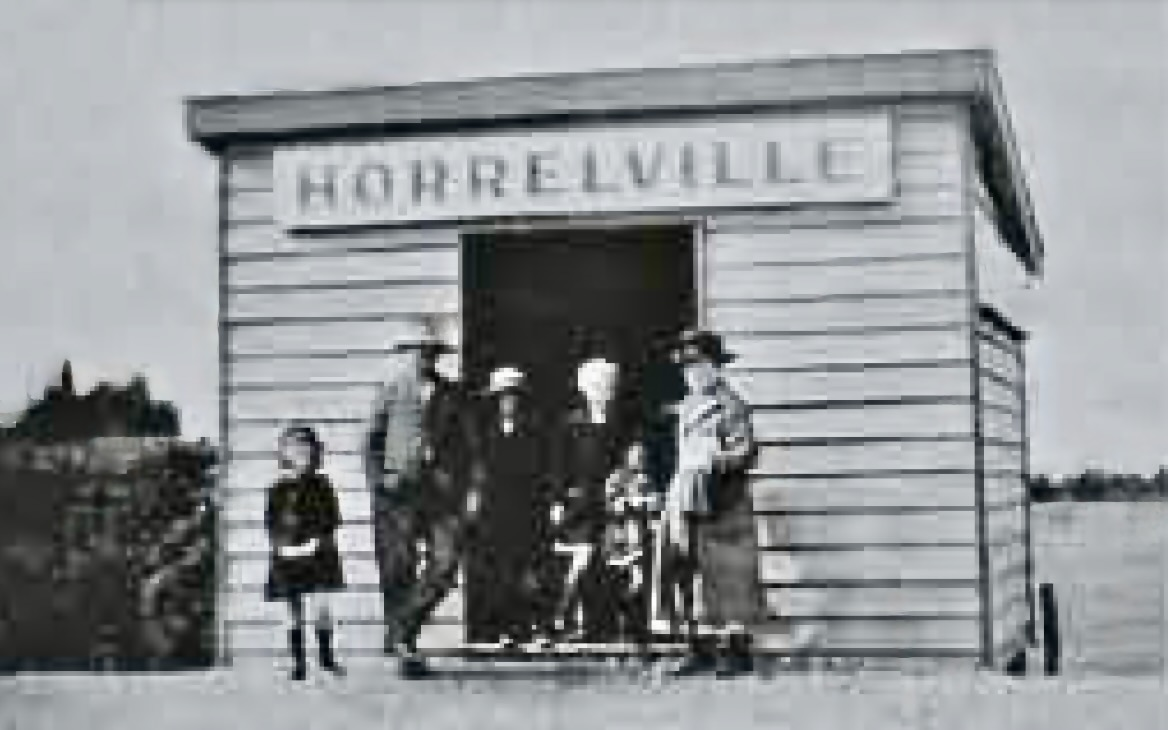
- Horrrelville railway station
  West Eyreton
- Mandeville North
- Swannanoa
- Bennetts Junction

A sign marks the location of Horrellville station.

A couple of bridge abutments and culverts survive, including near West Etyeton School where they have been repurposed as part of a new walking track.

Otherwise, little remains of one of New Zealand's more minor branch lines.
