= Eyreton =

- Locality
- Interactive map of Eyreton
- Coordinates: 43°24′54.3″S 172°32′39.3″E
- Country: New Zealand
- Island: South Island
- Region: Canterbury
- Ward: Oxford-Ohoka Ward

Area
  - Total: 14.33 km^{2} (5.53 sq mi)

Population (2023 census)
  - Total: 336
  - Density: 23.4/km^{2} (60.7/sq mi)
- Time zone: UTC+12 (NZST)
  - Summer (DST): UTC+13 (NZDT)

Eyreton, originally known as Eyretown, is a small village in the Canterbury region of New Zealand's South Island. It is named after Edward John Eyre, who at one time was the lieutenant governor of the South Island (then known as New Munster). It is a rural village located to the west of Kaiapoi, near the north bank of the Waimakariri River.

Although a branch line railway called the Eyreton Branch existed, it never actually ran through Eyreton; its route from Kaiapoi to West Eyreton passed north of the village.

== Demographics ==
Eyreton locality covers 14.33 km^{2} (5.53 sq mi) It is part of the larger Swannanoa-Eyreton statistical area.

Historical population
Year	Pop.	±% p.a.
2006	237	—
2013	333	+4.98%
2018	330	−0.18%
2023	336	+0.36%

Eyreton had a population of 336 in the 2023 New Zealand census, an increase of 6 people (1.8%) since the 2018 census, and an increase of 3 people (0.9%) since the 2013 census. There were 162 males and 168 females in 123 dwellings. 0.9% of people identified as LGBTIQ+. There were 54 people (16.1%) aged under 15 years, 48 (14.3%) aged 15 to 29, 171 (50.9%) aged 30 to 64, and 60 (17.9%) aged 65 or older.

People could identify as more than one ethnicity. The results were 94.6% European (Pākehā), 6.2% Māori, 2.7% Pasifika, 1.8% Asian, and 3.6% other, which includes people giving their ethnicity as "New Zealander". English was spoken by 98.2%, Māori by 1.8%, Samoan by 0.9%, and other languages by 6.2%. No language could be spoken by 0.9% (e.g. too young to talk). The percentage of people born overseas was 12.5, compared with 28.8% nationally.

Religious affiliations were 29.5% Christian, and 2.7% other religions. People who answered that they had no religion were 59.8%, and 7.1% of people did not answer the census question.

Of those at least 15 years old, 63 (22.3%) people had a bachelor's or higher degree, 171 (60.6%) had a post-high school certificate or diploma, and 39 (13.8%) people exclusively held high school qualifications. 54 people (19.1%) earned over $100,000 compared to 12.1% nationally. The employment status of those at least 15 was 150 (53.2%) full-time, 51 (18.1%) part-time, and 3 (1.1%) unemployed.
