= West Eyreton =

Settlement in Canterbury, New Zealand

- Rural Area
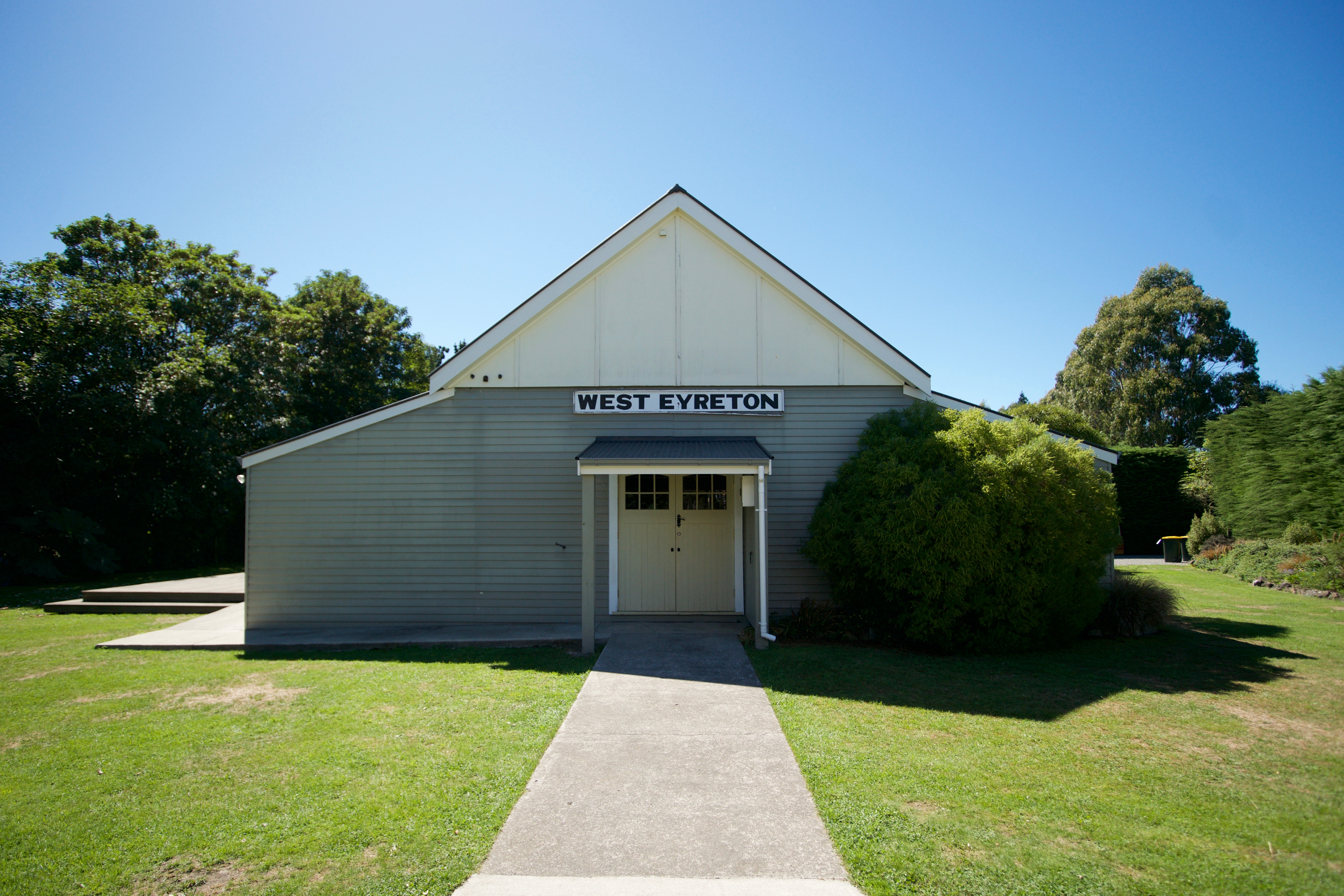
- Community hall at West Eyreton
- Interactive map of West Eyreton
- Coordinates: 43°21′S 172°23′E
- Country: New Zealand
- Region: Canterbury
- Territorial authority: Waimakariri District
- Ward: Oxford-Ohoka Ward
- Community: Oxford-Ohoka Community
- Electorates: Waimakariri; Te Tai Tonga (Māori)

Government
  - Territorial Authority: Waimakariri District Council
  - Regional council: Environment Canterbury
  - Mayor of Waimakariri: Dan Gordon
  - Waimakariri MP: Matt Doocey
  - Te Tai Tonga MP: Tākuta Ferris

Area
  - Total: 114.89 km^{2} (44.36 sq mi)

Population (June 2025)
  - Total: 1,610
  - Density: 14.0/km^{2} (36.3/sq mi)
- Time zone: UTC+12 (NZST)
  - Summer (DST): UTC+13 (NZDT)
- Postcode: 7475
- Area code: 03

West Eyreton is a small rural village in the Canterbury region of New Zealand's South Island. It is west of Kaiapoi and north-west of Eyreton and is named after Edward John Eyre, a 19th-century lieutenant governor of the South Island, then known as New Munster. In the 2001 New Zealand census the population was 1,146 (573 males and 573 females), an increase of 306 or 36.4% since the 1996 census.

In the 1870s, poor transport led to the construction of the Eyreton Branch railway line, which opened on 17 December 1875. Despite its name it ran to the north of Eyreton and originally terminated in West Eyreton, extended to Bennetts Junction on the Oxford Branch on 1 February 1878. Beyond Horrelville closed on 9 February 1931, and on 26 May 1954 low traffic led to the closure of the branch. Little remains besides some of the formation and a loading bank at the site of station.

== Demographics ==
The West Eyreton statistical area covers 114.89 km^{2} (44.36 sq mi). It had an estimated population of 1,610 as of June 2025, with a population density of 14.0 people per km^{2}.

Historical population
| Year | Pop. | ±% p.a. |
|---|---|---|
| 2006 | 1,101 | — |
| 2013 | 1,374 | +3.21% |
| 2018 | 1,464 | +1.28% |
| 2023 | 1,530 | +0.89% |

West Eyreton had a population of 1,530 in the 2023 New Zealand census, an increase of 66 people (4.5%) since the 2018 census, and an increase of 156 people (11.4%) since the 2013 census. There were 801 males, 723 females, and 6 people of other genders in 528 dwellings. 2.2% of people identified as LGBTIQ+. The median age was 44.8 years (compared with 38.1 years nationally). There were 282 people (18.4%) aged under 15 years, 243 (15.9%) aged 15 to 29, 756 (49.4%) aged 30 to 64, and 249 (16.3%) aged 65 or older.

People could identify as more than one ethnicity. The results were 93.7% European (Pākehā); 6.5% Māori; 1.6% Pasifika; 3.1% Asian; 0.4% Middle Eastern, Latin American and African New Zealanders (MELAA); and 3.5% other, which includes people giving their ethnicity as "New Zealander". English was spoken by 98.6%, Māori by 1.0%, and other languages by 7.1%. No language could be spoken by 1.4% (e.g. too young to talk). New Zealand Sign Language was known by 1.0%. The percentage of people born overseas was 18.2, compared with 28.8% nationally.

Religious affiliations were 31.0% Christian, 0.2% Hindu, 0.2% Māori religious beliefs, 0.6% Buddhist, 0.6% New Age, and 0.8% other religions. People who answered that they had no religion were 57.8%, and 9.2% of people did not answer the census question.

Of those at least 15 years old, 255 (20.4%) people had a bachelor's or higher degree, 738 (59.1%) had a post-high school certificate or diploma, and 258 (20.7%) people exclusively held high school qualifications. The median income was $43,800, compared with $41,500 nationally. 192 people (15.4%) earned over $100,000 compared to 12.1% nationally. The employment status of those at least 15 was 666 (53.4%) full-time, 225 (18.0%) part-time, and 24 (1.9%) unemployed.

== Education ==
West Eyreton School is West Eyreton's only school. It is a state coeducational full primary school with a decile rating of 10 and a roll of 185 students (as of July 2026). It opened in 1872 as West Eyreton School, but later was called Eyreton West School until 1967.

== Climate ==
Climate data for West Eyreton (1991–2020)
| Month | Jan | Feb | Mar | Apr | May | Jun | Jul | Aug | Sep | Oct | Nov | Dec | Year |
|---|---|---|---|---|---|---|---|---|---|---|---|---|---|
| Mean daily maximum °C (°F) | 21.3 (70.3) | 21.2 (70.2) | 19.2 (66.6) | 16.7 (62.1) | 14.3 (57.7) | 11.3 (52.3) | 11.0 (51.8) | 12.2 (54.0) | 14.3 (57.7) | 16.5 (61.7) | 17.9 (64.2) | 19.7 (67.5) | 16.3 (61.3) |
| Daily mean °C (°F) | 16.1 (61.0) | 15.9 (60.6) | 13.9 (57.0) | 11.2 (52.2) | 8.9 (48.0) | 6.0 (42.8) | 5.5 (41.9) | 6.8 (44.2) | 8.8 (47.8) | 10.8 (51.4) | 12.6 (54.7) | 14.7 (58.5) | 10.9 (51.7) |
| Mean daily minimum °C (°F) | 10.9 (51.6) | 10.6 (51.1) | 8.5 (47.3) | 5.8 (42.4) | 3.4 (38.1) | 0.7 (33.3) | 0.1 (32.2) | 1.4 (34.5) | 3.4 (38.1) | 5.1 (41.2) | 7.3 (45.1) | 9.8 (49.6) | 5.6 (42.0) |
Source: NIWA
