= Joseph Pawelka =

New Zealand criminal, prison escaper

Joseph John Thomas Pawelka (1887–?) was a New Zealand criminal and prison escaper. He was born in West Oxford, Canterbury, New Zealand in 1887. His parents, Josef Pawelka and Louise Konig, were Moravian immigrants to New Zealand. In 1900, thirteen-year-old Joseph was apprenticed to an uncle as a butcher. By 1908, he had made his way to the North Island city of Palmerston North, where he contracted typhoid fever and was hospitalised for five months.

On 29 September 1909, he married Hannah Wilson, but made a suicide attempt in December 1909. Thereafter, Hannah made out a separation order against her husband. A daughter, Iris, was born in July 1910 to the estranged couple.

== Imprisonment and escapes ==
On February 25, 1910, Pawelka and Hannah turned up at Palmerston North police station, where Hannah accused her estranged husband of breaching their separation order. Hannah sought police protection and during the police search of his house, Pawelka was found to have an unregistered firearm and stolen goods from several hitherto unsolved burglaries. Consequently, Pawelka was then arrested and charged with theft. He appeared in the Palmerston North Magistrates Court on March 7, 1910, but escaped from custody five days later, on 12 March 1910. He was apprehended at the neighbouring community of Awahuri on 14 March 1910 and transferred to Wellington's Terrace Gaol.

On 23 March, Pawelka took advantage of a negligently unlocked door after a constable had transferred a cellmate out of his cell, and promptly escaped from custody again, making his way north. On April 2, he robbed a Palmerston North couple, Mr and Mrs. Kendall, and on April 5, 1910, Palmerston North High School and a shop were burnt down through arson. On April 9, 1910, Pawleka appeared at his wife and mother-in-law's residence and threatened both On April 10, 1910, he made a burglary attempt on the home of a local butcher, and in the melee that resulted, Police Sergeant John McGuire was wounded by gunfire. He died of the injury on 14 April 1910

On April 20, 1910, constables James Thompson and John Gallagher finally recaptured Pawelka at a cowshed in Ashhurst, an outlying Palmerston North suburb. Over the next month, there were several Supreme Court cases, in which he was acquitted of the shooting of Constable McGuire and the robbery, but convicted of theft, arson and escape from police custody. On June 8, 1910, Justice Theophilus Cooper sentenced Pawelka to twenty one years imprisonment, provoking a public outcry given the relative severity of the sentence. Subsequently, Pawelka made three more prison escape attempts, on 11, 14 and 17 August 1911. In the latter case, he remained free for an hour. Finally, on 27 August 1911, he removed a grille above his cell and was last seen absconding toward Wellington's Botanical Gardens Pawelka was never recaptured, and his ultimate fate remains a mystery, although his escapades have earned him occasional inclusion in New Zealand criminal history accounts
