= Bernard Sladden =

Bernard Sladden (1879–1961) was a notable New Zealand farmer, wildlife ranger, historian and naturalist. He was born in Oxford, North Canterbury, New Zealand in 1879.
