= Waimakariri Gorge =

Gorge in New Zealand

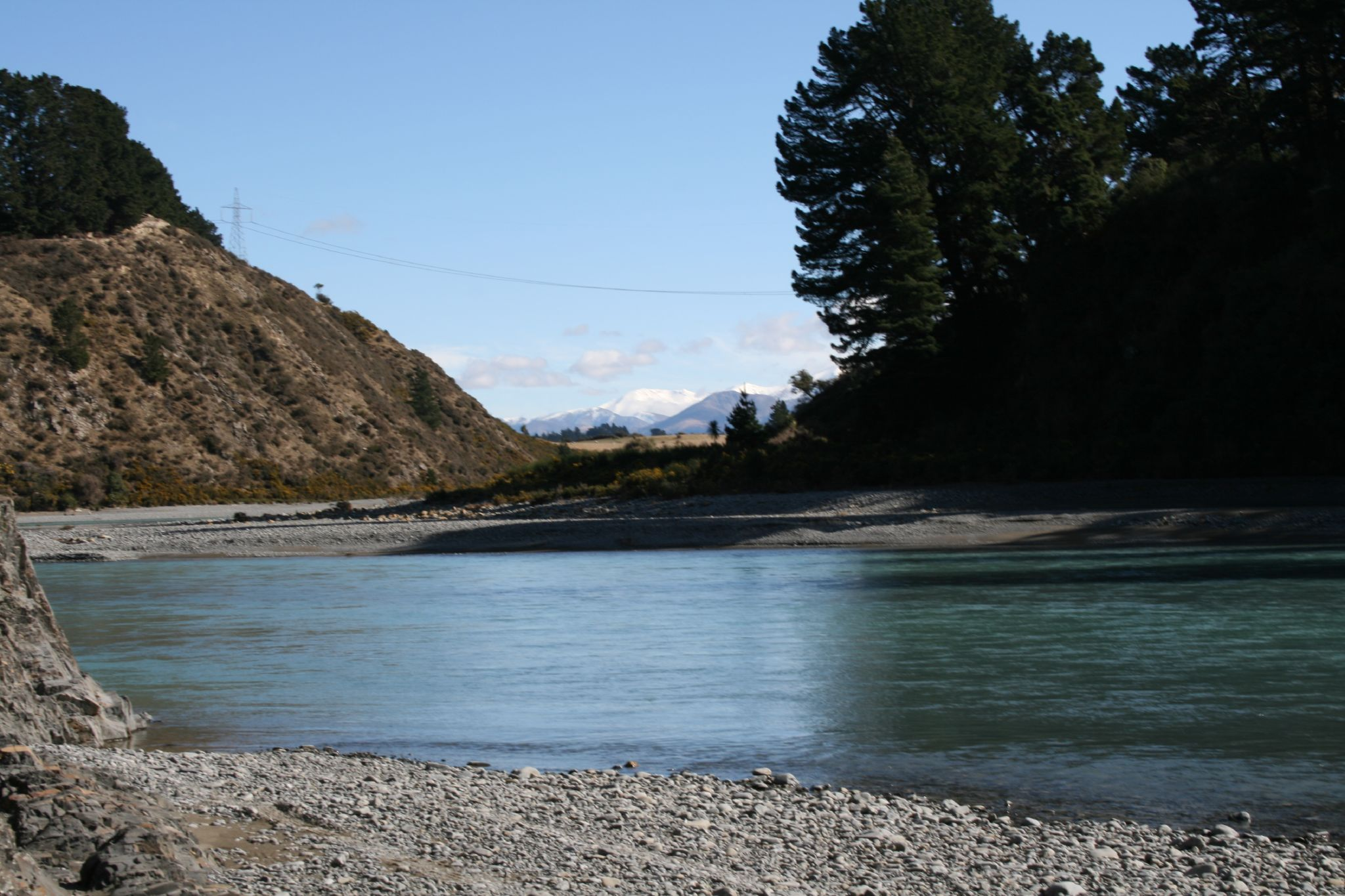
- Looking down the Waimakariri Gorge towards the Southern Alps

- Location within New Zealand

Geography
- Coordinates: 43°13′41″S 171°56′53″E
- Interactive map of Waimakariri Gorge

The Waimakariri Gorge is located on the Waimakariri River in inland Canterbury in the South Island of New Zealand.

The height of the Waimakariri gorge bridge is 30m.

Like its neighbour, the Rakaia River, the Waimakariri runs through wide shingle beds for much of its length, but is forced through a narrow canyon as it approaches the Canterbury Plains.

Much of the gorge is followed by the Midland line. The Waimakariri Gorge Bridge was built in 1876 by William Stocks. Until the early 1930s, it carried the Oxford Branch railway line connecting Oxford and Sheffield.
