= Oxford, New Zealand =

Town in Canterbury, New Zealand

Oxford Tawera (Māori)
- Minor urban area
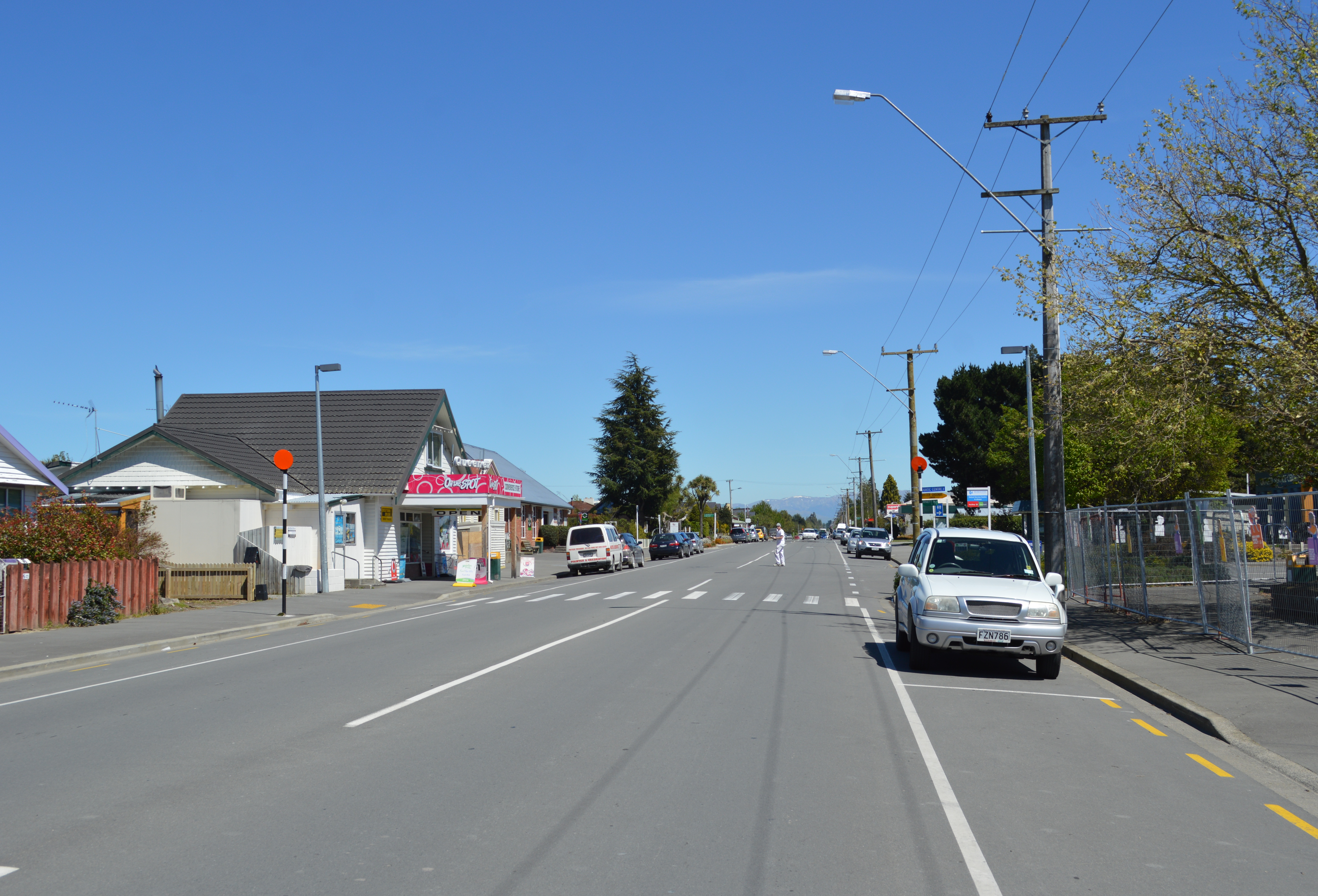
- The main street (Inland Scenic Route) of Oxford
- Interactive map of Oxford
- Coordinates: 43°18′46″S 172°11′26″E
- Country: New Zealand
- Region: Canterbury
- Territorial authority: Waimakariri District
- Ward: Oxford-Ohoka Ward
- Community: Oxford-Ohoka Community
- Electorates: Waimakariri; Te Tai Tonga (Māori)

Government
  - Territorial Authority: Waimakariri District Council
  - Regional council: Environment Canterbury
  - Mayor of Waimakariri: Dan Gordon
  - Waimakariri MP: Matt Doocey
  - Te Tai Tonga MP: Tākuta Ferris

Area
  - Total: 11.82 km^{2} (4.56 sq mi)
- Elevation: 235 m (771 ft)

Population (June 2025)
  - Total: 2,250
  - Density: 190/km^{2} (493/sq mi)
- Time zone: UTC+12 (NZST)
  - Summer (DST): UTC+13 (NZDT)
- Postcode(s): 7430
- Area code: 03
- Website: www.oxfordnewzealand.co.nz

Oxford (Māori: Tawera) is a small town serving the farming community of North Canterbury, New Zealand. It is part of the Waimakariri District and is a linear town, approximately 2 kilometres (1.2 mi) long. Oxford has won awards for the most beautiful village and the most beautiful toilet.

== Toponymy ==
It is unclear whether the town is named after Oxford in England or after its university, but it is more probable that it was named after Samuel Wilberforce, who was the Bishop of Oxford from 1845 to 1870. It was named by the chief surveyor of the Canterbury Association, Joseph Thomas, in 1849.

The town of Tīrau in the North Island was originally also named Oxford, in a name pairing with Cambridge 30 km to the west. Owing to confusion between the two towns, the North Island town was later renamed Oxford North before adopting its current name in 1895.

== History ==
It was originally a logging town: trees were felled from forests in the area, and hauled by beast to Christchurch. A mural depicting life from that era is painted on the side wall of the butchers shop.

=== Transport ===
Originally, it was served by the Oxford Branch railway, and had two stations, East Oxford and West Oxford. The line closed in 1959 and was dismantled. Some railway signs and the remnants of railway platforms can still be seen along Oxford Road on the way to Rangiora.

Oxford was linked to Christchurch in 1878 by the narrow-gauge Oxford Branch from Oxford West to Rangiora to meet the broad gauge from Christchurch. With the gauge conversion of 1878, it became easier to transfer passengers and freight from the branch line to Christchurch, though passengers still had to change at Rangiora from the Waipara train to the branch train. The branch stretched from Rangiora through Bennetts Junction (where the Eyreton Branch joined), Oxford and Sheffield. This necessitated a high road-rail bridge across the Waimakariri Gorge.

From Oxford to Sheffield closed in 1931 along with the Eyreton Branch, leaving the Oxford branch as a rural branch line. It lost its passenger service in the 1940s. Due to declining revenue, the branch closed on 31 May 1959 and the track was sold to Scotts Engineering of Christchurch, which used the rails from several branch lines to build farm sheds.

The line was latterly worked by the A and A^{B} class 4-6-2 and C class 2-6-2 tender locomotives. No diesel locomotives or railcars are known to have used the branch, although thought was given in the 1940s to running a small railcar.

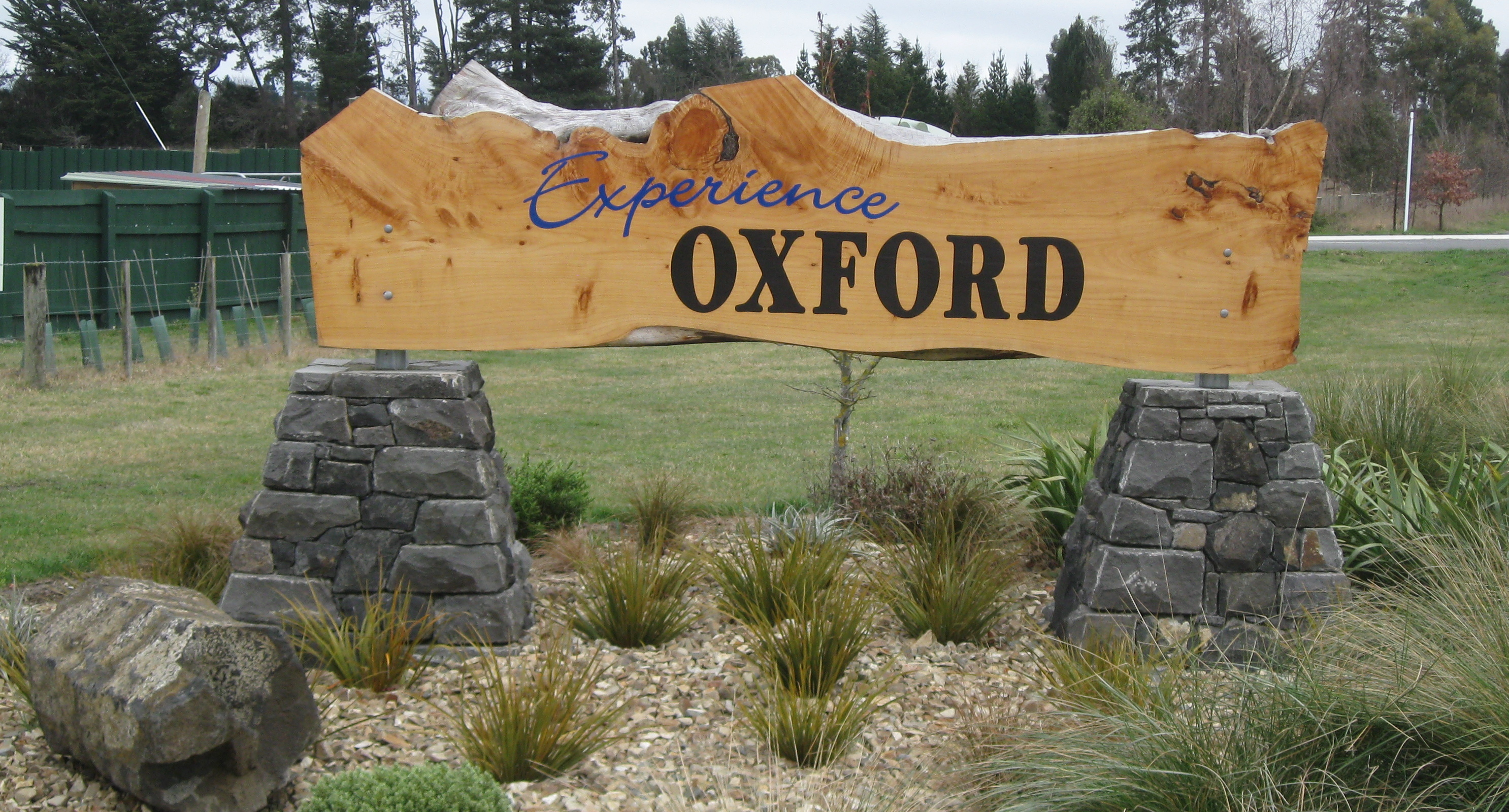
New Township Entry Sign

=== Renovation of Main Street ===
During 2009, Main Street underwent a major renovation with the road resurfaced, pedestrian refuges in strategic locations and new footpaths with garden beds. The old welcome signs were replaced with new "Experience Oxford" signs at east and west entries. This project was a joint undertaking by the Waimakariri District Council and the Oxford Promotions and Action Committee (OPAC), but they ran out of money and did not finish both sides of the street.

== Geography ==
Oxford is located at the inland edge of the Canterbury Plains, approximately 50 km northwest of Christchurch. The township is about 30 km from Rangiora to the East, and the townships of Sheffield and Darfield to the west.

The climate of Oxford is warm and temperate. Snowfalls are rare, but surrounding hills get snowfall on an annual basis.

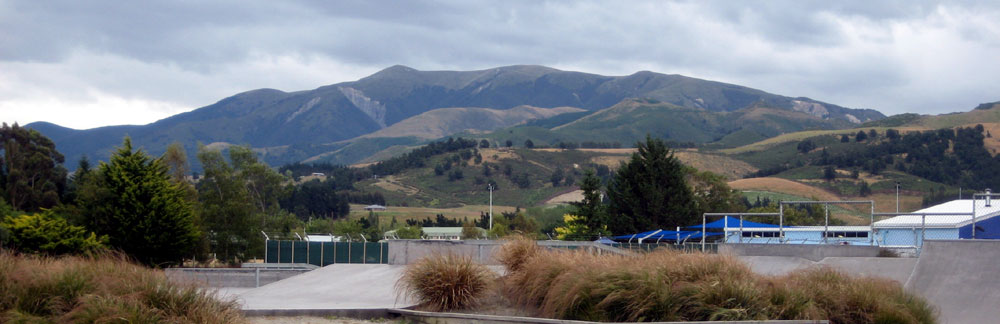
Mt Oxford behind park

=== Oxford Forest Conservation Area ===
The Oxford Forest Conservation Area is a protected forest area of 11,350 ha (28,000 acres) located in foothills near the township. The forest is a remnant of extensive beech and podocarp forests that previously covered inland parts of North Canterbury. It includes walking and mountain biking tracks and is a recreational hunting area. In 2024, the conservation area was designated by DarkSky International as New Zealand’s second International Dark Sky Park.

== Demographics ==
Oxford is described as a small urban area by Stats NZ, and covers 11.82 km^{2} (4.56 sq mi). It had an estimated population of 2,250 as of June 2025, with a population density of 190 people per km^{2}.

Historical population
Year	Pop.	±% p.a.
2006	1,728	—
2013	1,929	+1.58%
2018	2,214	+2.79%
2023	2,235	+0.19%

Oxford had a population of 2,235 in the 2023 New Zealand census, an increase of 21 people (0.9%) since the 2018 census, and an increase of 306 people (15.9%) since the 2013 census. There were 1,086 males, 1,146 females, and 6 people of other genders in 915 dwellings. 2.7% of people identified as LGBTIQ+. The median age was 49.7 years (compared with 38.1 years nationally). There were 393 people (17.6%) aged under 15 years, 267 (11.9%) aged 15 to 29, 918 (41.1%) aged 30 to 64, and 654 (29.3%) aged 65 or older.

People could identify as more than one ethnicity. The results were 96.0% European (Pākehā); 6.6% Māori; 1.1% Pasifika; 2.0% Asian; 0.7% Middle Eastern, Latin American and African New Zealanders (MELAA); and 2.7% other, which includes people giving their ethnicity as "New Zealander". English was spoken by 97.9%, Māori by 1.3%, Samoan by 0.1%, and other languages by 5.2%. No language could be spoken by 1.9% (e.g. too young to talk). New Zealand Sign Language was known by 0.4%. The percentage of people born overseas was 19.7, compared with 28.8% nationally.

Religious affiliations were 30.5% Christian, 0.1% Hindu, 0.4% Islam, 0.1% Māori religious beliefs, 0.3% Buddhist, 0.8% New Age, 0.1% Jewish, and 0.9% other religions. People who answered that they had no religion were 57.9%, and 9.4% of people did not answer the census question.

Of those at least 15 years old, 270 (14.7%) people had a bachelor's or higher degree, 1,107 (60.1%) had a post-high school certificate or diploma, and 468 (25.4%) people exclusively held high school qualifications. The median income was $32,100, compared with $41,500 nationally. 120 people (6.5%) earned over $100,000 compared to 12.1% nationally. The employment status of those at least 15 was 786 (42.7%) full-time, 285 (15.5%) part-time, and 21 (1.1%) unemployed.

== Community and culture ==
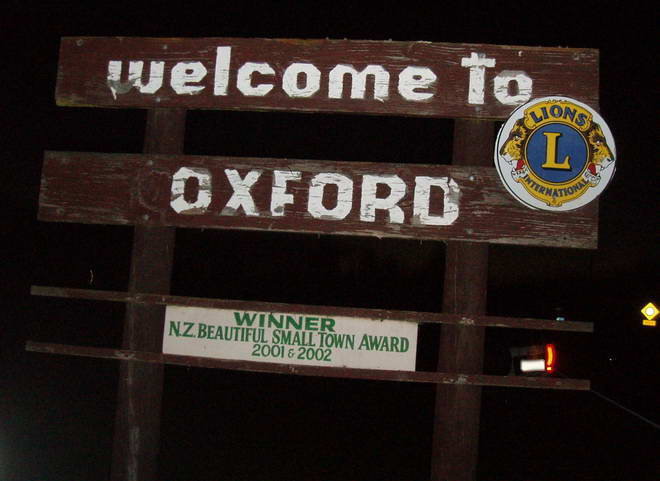
"Welcome to Oxford" sign, with "NZ Beautiful Small Town" claim

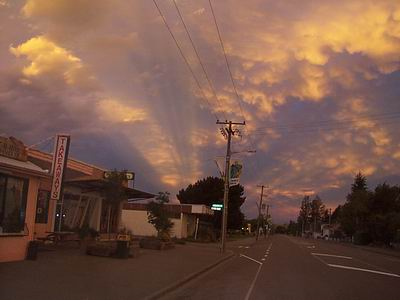
Looking east

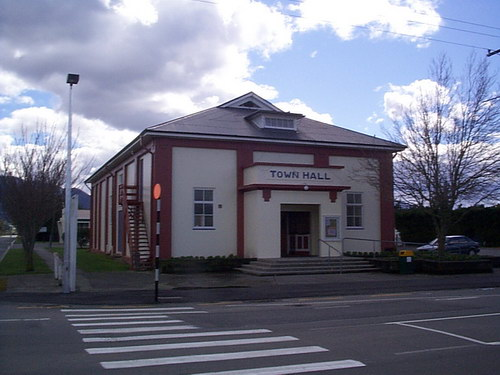
The Town Hall before earthquake renovations

The community saved hard during 2005 and 2006 to raise funds for projects such as the Oxford Community Pool, a community-based swimming pool in Burnett Street, and a first-response ambulance. The town prides itself on its ability to self-fund community projects through organisations such as the Lions.

=== Organisations ===
Oxford has several Churches and community organisations:

- Waimak Bible Chapel (Brethren Assembly)
- Oxford Union Church (Presbyterian)
- Oxford Baptist Church
- Sacred Heart Catholic Church
- Seventh Day Adventist Church
- Anglican Church
- Tawera Masonic Lodge
- Oxford Working Men’s Club
- West Oxford Hotel (Public House - The West)

=== Oxford Benevolent and Improvement League ===
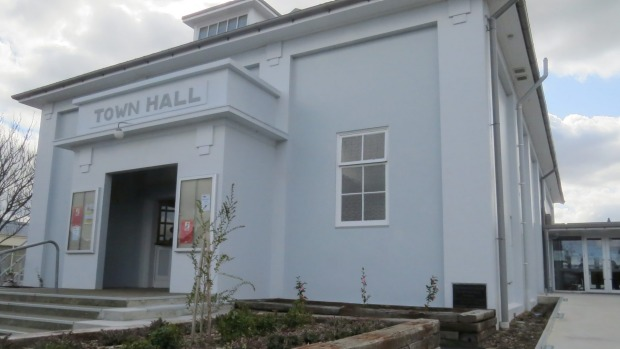
Oxford town hall after earthquake renovations

The OB&I was formed during World War I to provide charitable support to war widows. To raise money, it showed films in the old Oxford Town Hall. It provides charitable support to the citizens of Oxford. Movies are screened in the Town Hall approximately every other Saturday during the winter. The heyday of the OB&I movies was the middle of the 20th century, when three or four films would be shown every week and queues often extended around the building. This was before private car ownership became popular, as the nearest cinema was in Christchurch, some 50 km distant.

In late 2011, the Oxford Town Hall where movies had been shown was closed, along with several other Council operated buildings, as the building was determined to be earthquake prone. The Oxford Town hall was reopened on 19 February 2015.

=== Books about Oxford ===
There are a number of books about Oxford. Littledene: a New Zealand rural community published in 1938 is perhaps the most comprehensive; the book is a "sociological study of a typical New Zealand small town", with the fictional name of Littledene, but the research and details of the book all relate to Oxford.

== Education ==
The town has one school, Oxford Area School. It is a state composite (Year 1–13) school with a role of 468 students (as of July 2026). East Oxford School opened in 1872, and added secondary schooling in 1913. It merged with West Oxford, Ashley Gorge, Carleton and Cooper's Creek schools on the present site in the 1920s. It became Oxford District High School, and merged with other local primary schools in 1978 to form Oxford Area School.

== Notable people ==
- Joseph Pawelka (1887–?), New Zealand criminal and prison escaper
- Bernard Sladden (1879–1961), farmer, wildlife ranger, historian and naturalist
- Jo Seagar, chef
