= Midland line (New Zealand) =

Railway line in New Zealand

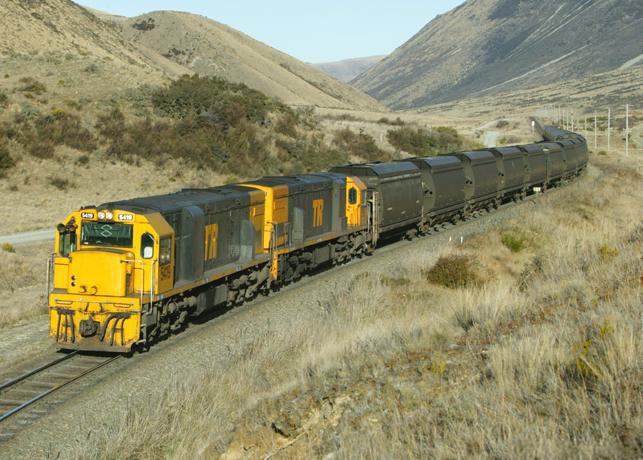
- Two DX class locomotives in Tranz Rail Bumble-bee livery hauling a 1,800 tonne coal train on the Midland line in 2006.

Overview
- Status: Open to passengers and freight
- Owner: KiwiRail
- Locale: South Island, New Zealand
- Termini: Rolleston, Canterbury; Greymouth, West Coast

Service
- Type: Heavy Rail
- System: New Zealand railway network
- Operator(s): KiwiRail; The Great Journeys of New Zealand

History
- Opened: 4 August 1923 (complete line)

Technical
- Line length: 212 km (132 mi)
- Character: Main line
- Track gauge: 3 ft 6 in (1,067 mm)
- Electrification: 1500V DC (Arthurs Pass to Otira, 4 August 1923 – 1 November 1997)
- Maximum incline: 3% (1 in 33) in Otira Tunnel

Map

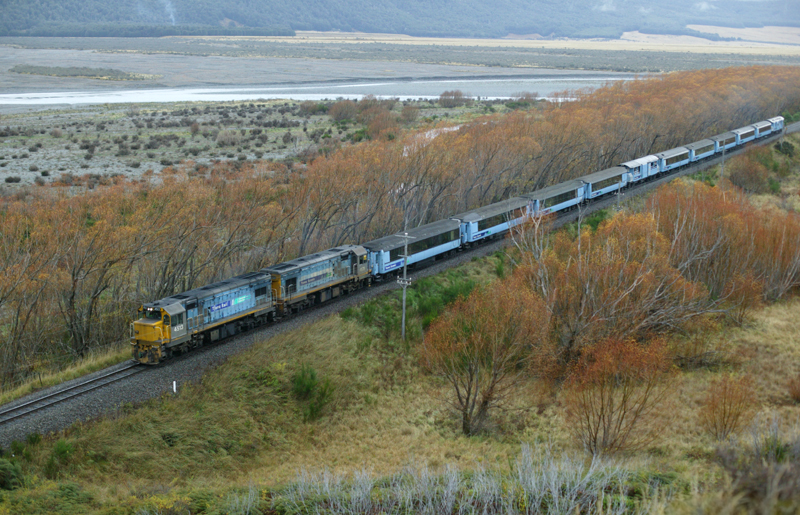
The TranzAlpine, hauled by two DC class locomotives.

The Midland line is a 212 km section of railway between Rolleston and Greymouth in the South Island of New Zealand. The line features five major bridges, five viaducts and 17 tunnels, the longest of which is the Otira tunnel. It is the route of the popular TranzAlpine passenger train.

== History ==
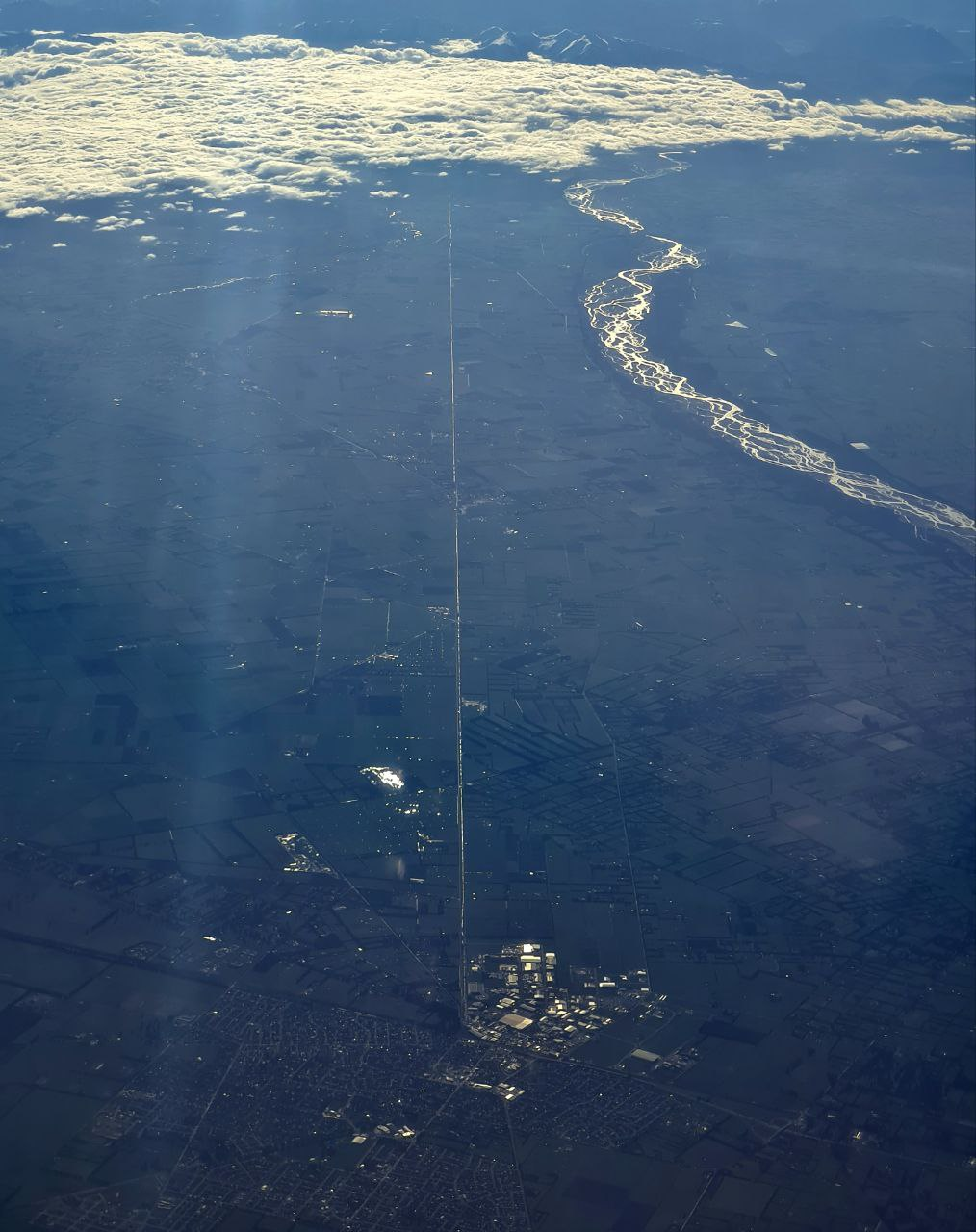
Aerial view of the straight run from Rolleston to Kirwee gleaming from the afternoon Sun, August 2022

Railway development in the South Island in the 1870s was concentrated on a main line linking the established centres of Christchurch, Timaru, Dunedin and Invercargill and light, easily constructed branch lines serving the arable plains; (see Vogel Era). These later included a branch to Springfield which was reached by January 1880.

In 1882 the East and West Coast Railway League was formed and in 1884 a Royal Commission, although fully aware of the construction difficulties of the Waimakariri Valley-Arthurs Pass route, as compared with the somewhat easier but longer Hurunui Valley-Harpers Pass route, chose the more direct route.

The construction of the line was rejected in 1883 by a Royal Commission, who argued that despite the significant timber and coal resources of the West Coast of the South Island, the line would not be economic, in the face of limited resources during the Premiership of Sir Julius Vogel, although Parliament did pass the East and West Coast and Nelson Railway Act to enable private interests to construct a line. The major obstacle to engineers and politicians was the Southern Alps. In 1886 the New Zealand Midland Railway Company was formed by Nelson and Canterbury business interests to construct the line, and the line from Westport to Nelson, and capital was raised in London by the firm to meet this end. The Company entered into a contract with the Government the same year.

For various reasons, the company managed to complete only 120 km of the line, and the Government exercised its right to take possession of the line in 1895, although protracted legal battles meant that full control was not achieved until 1900, with the line complete as far as Otira on the western side and Broken River on the eastern (Canterbury) side.

The major obstacle to the route lay immediately ahead: the forcing of the Waimakariri and Broken River gorges, some 8.5 miles (13 km) of the route surveyed by C. Napier Bell in 1883 and described to the Royal Commission by District Engineer W.N. Blair as "very rough, the mountain slope rises from the riverbed while the river runs in a fearful gorge all the way".

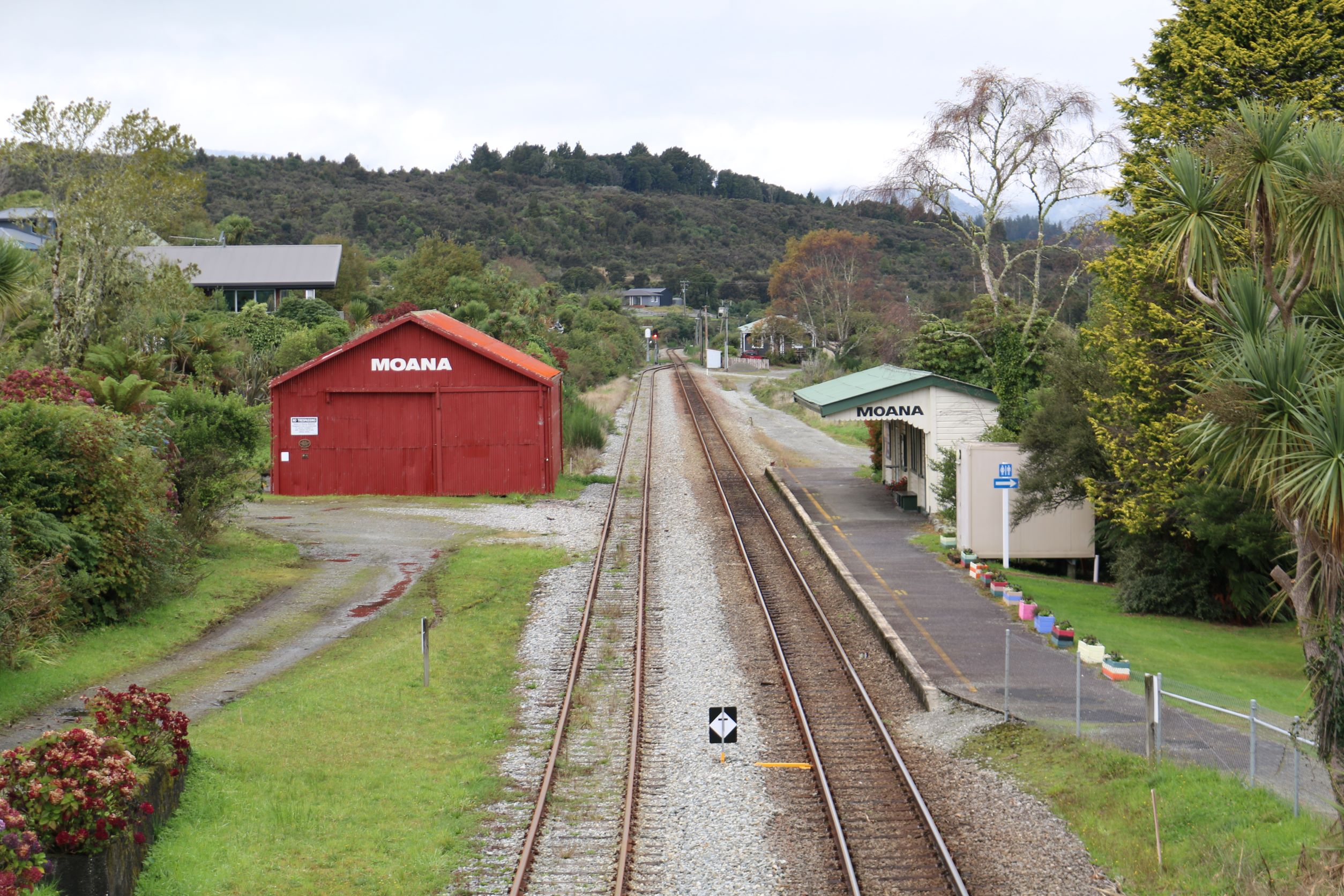
Moana railway station and goods shed (2021)

The section would include 16 tunnels and four major viaducts not including the Kowai already constructed. The viaducts were built under Treasury contracts by both New Zealand and British bridging firms. The most spectacular of these, the Staircase Viaduct carries the rails 75 metres above the bed of the stream.

It was slow laborious work with men, horses, picks, shovels and very little machinery. It was not until 1906 that trains were running to a temporary terminus at Broken River – in time for the Christchurch Exhibition and at last enabling the journey, by rail and coach, from Greymouth to Christchurch to be completed in one day. Progress slowed after that although the country to be traversed became much easier. Cass was not reached until 1910 and Arthur's Pass township in 1914 – the Westland section meantime having advanced to Otira – to meet the other major obstacle.

Construction of Otira Tunnel began in 1907, but progress was very slow. By 1912 only 2.9 km of the projected 9 km length of tunnel was complete and in 1913 the initial contractor walked off the job. In the interim the eastern railhead reached Arthur's Pass in 1914. Cobb & Co coaches were used to transport passengers between the two railheads while the tunnel was under construction. Undeterred the government continued with construction, despite spiralling costs and labour shortages due to World War I. The tunnel was finally completed in 1923.

== Passenger services ==
The Great Journeys of New Zealand train, the TranzAlpine, travels this line. The service operates 7 days as Trains 803 and 804 using DX class locomotives and AK class passenger carriages.

== Freight services ==
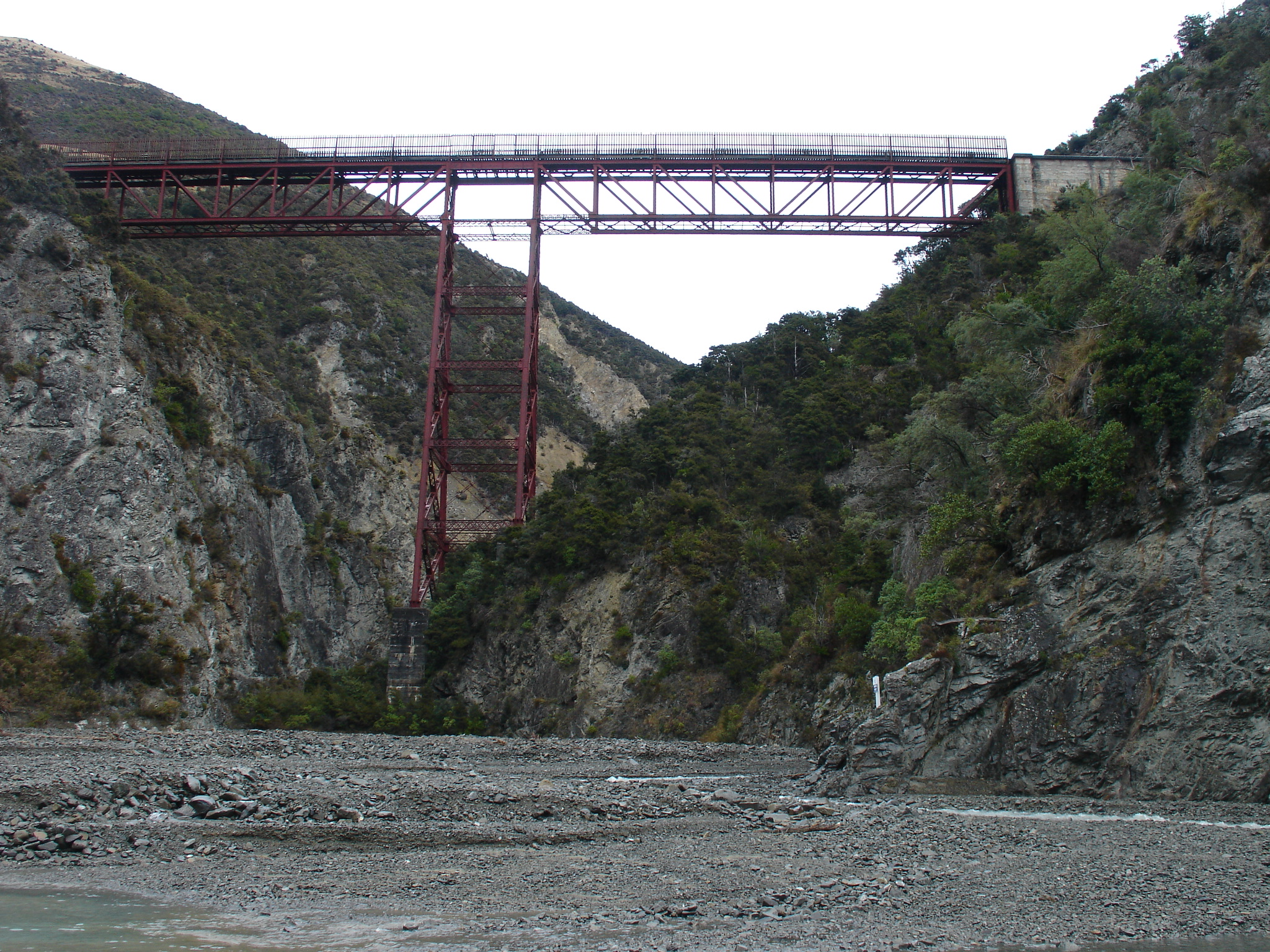
Stair Case Viaduct

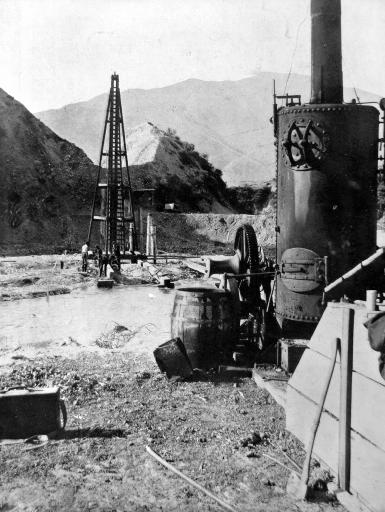
Driving piles for the Cass River bridge in 1911

Freight on the line depends largely on coal traffic, with other general freight being restricted to products from the Westland Milk Products factory at Hokitika. In 2003, Tranz Rail carried a total of 2.1 million tonnes of coal over the line.

Usually, coal services are headed by two class DX locomotives, and consist of 30 coal hopper wagons, with a total capacity of 1,800 tonnes.

On 27 November 2007, it was announced that coking coal from the Pike River Coal mine would be transported to Lyttelton for export. Pike River Coal had reserved under contract with Toll Rail 1.3 million tonnes of capacity for their coal on the line, which since upgrading has a total capacity of 4 million tonnes. However coal from the Pike River facility at Rapahoe stopped since the Pike River Mine disaster in November 2010.

The other primary source of coal traffic is from the Stockton Mine at Ngakawau, north of Westport. Trains to and from Ngakawau use the Midland line as far as the junction with the Stillwater - Westport Line.

== Motive power ==
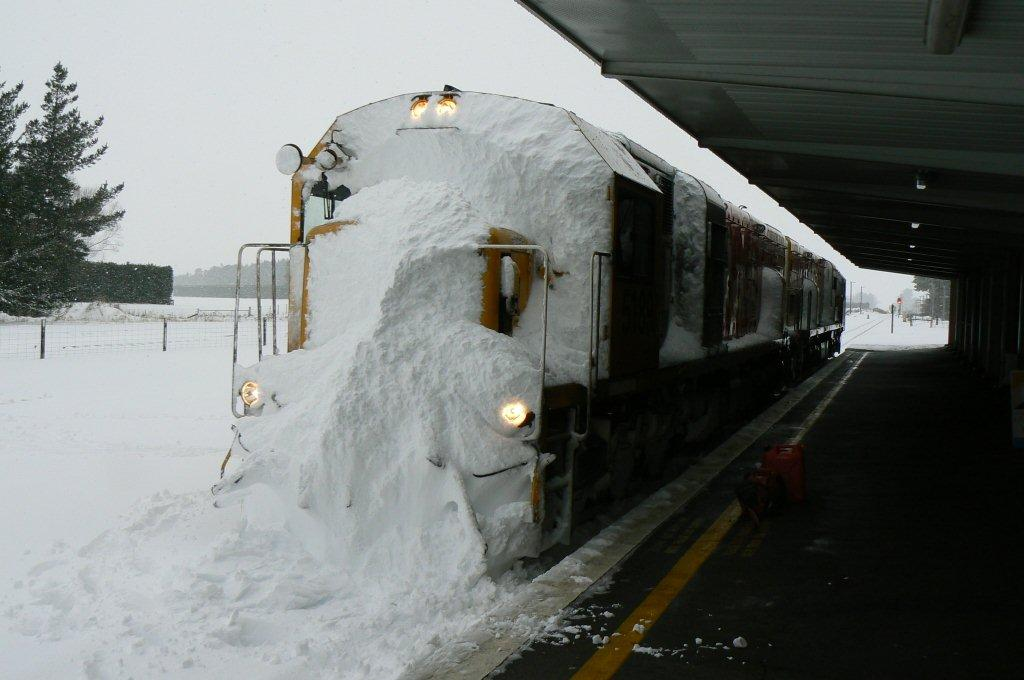
Two DX class locomotives on the Midland line, being used as a snow plough in 2011.

The line was unique in New Zealand for its captive use of many different types of locomotives. These locomotives include the K^{B} class locomotives between Arthur's Pass and Springfield, once the second most powerful steam locomotives in New Zealand (after the short-lived Garratt G class). The class were made famous by a documentary named "K^{B} country", a term that has entered into New Zealand railfan jargon. The Garratt G class, by then rebuilt as 'Pacific' type locomotives were also used on this route.

To house the larger and more numerous locomotives, Elmer Lane shed opened at Greymouth in 1928. Then the largest roundhouse in the country, its 70 ft (21 m) turntable replaced an earlier 50 ft (15 m) turntable.

The Otira tunnel was electrified 1923–1997, and two classes of electric locomotives were used – the English Electric EO class and then the New Zealand EA class locomotive. Some members of the EW class and ED class electric locomotives were also used.

Diesel traction was introduced to the line in 1968 with the arrival of the DJ class, which until the transfer of DC class locomotives in the early 1980s from the North Island was the dominant motive power on the line. Increasing volumes of coal traffic led to the introduction of the DX class, a number specially modified for use in the Otira Tunnel.

== Infrastructure ==
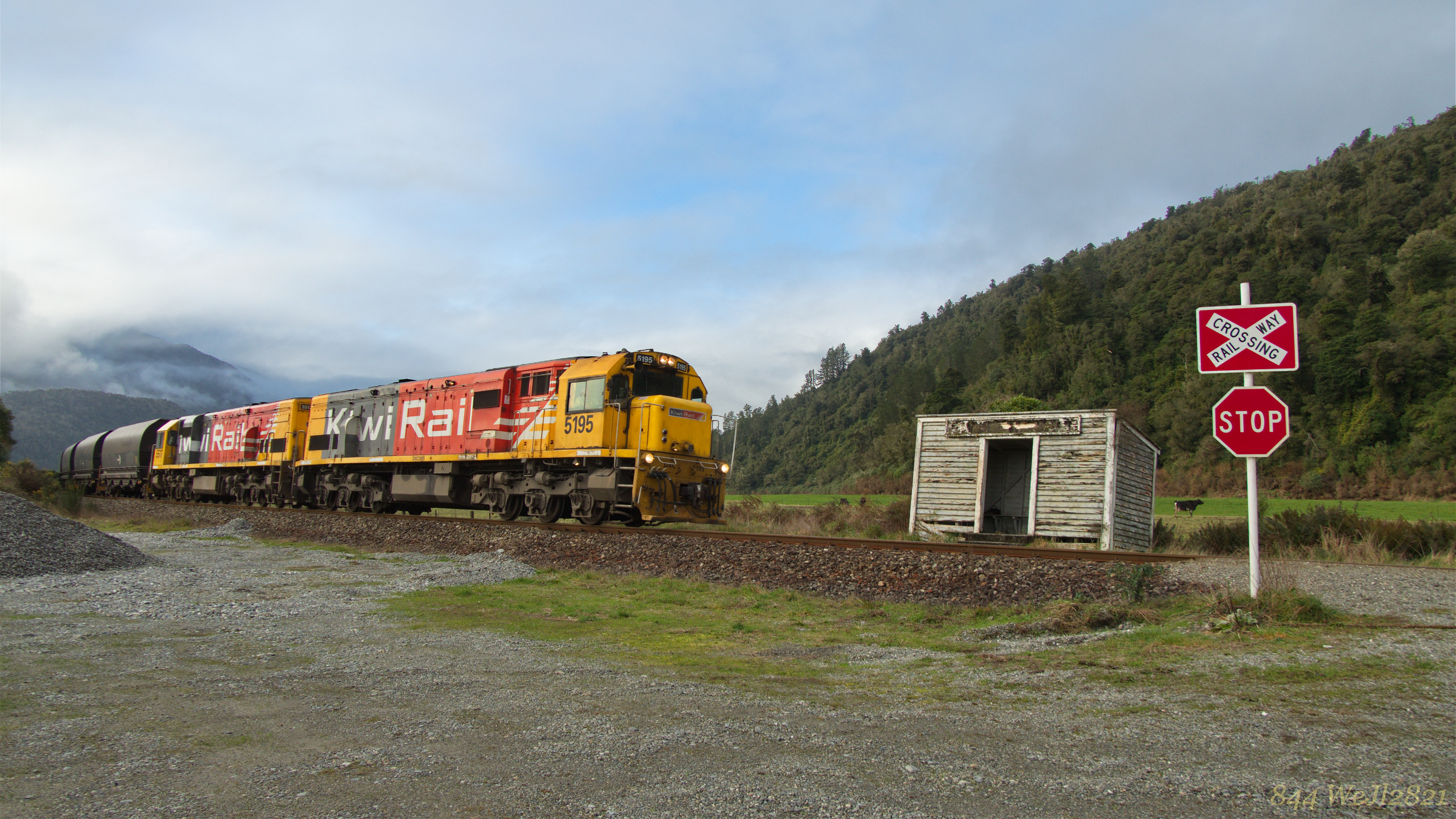
A coal train passing Inchbonnie's disused passenger shelter shed in 2021.

The line has 16 tunnels including the 8,554m Otira Tunnel and four major viaducts.

The heights and lengths of the viaducts are:

Name	Height	Length	Opened	Remarks
Staircase	72 m or 236 ft	149 m or 489 ft	1906	
Broken River	55 m or 180 ft	133 m or 436 ft	1906	
Slovens Creek	39 m or 128 ft	162 m or 531 ft	1910	
Pattersons Creek	37 m or 121 ft	186 m or 610 ft	1906	
