= Norman Kirk Park =

Recreational space in Kaiapoi, New Zealand

Norman Kirk Park, Kaiapoi
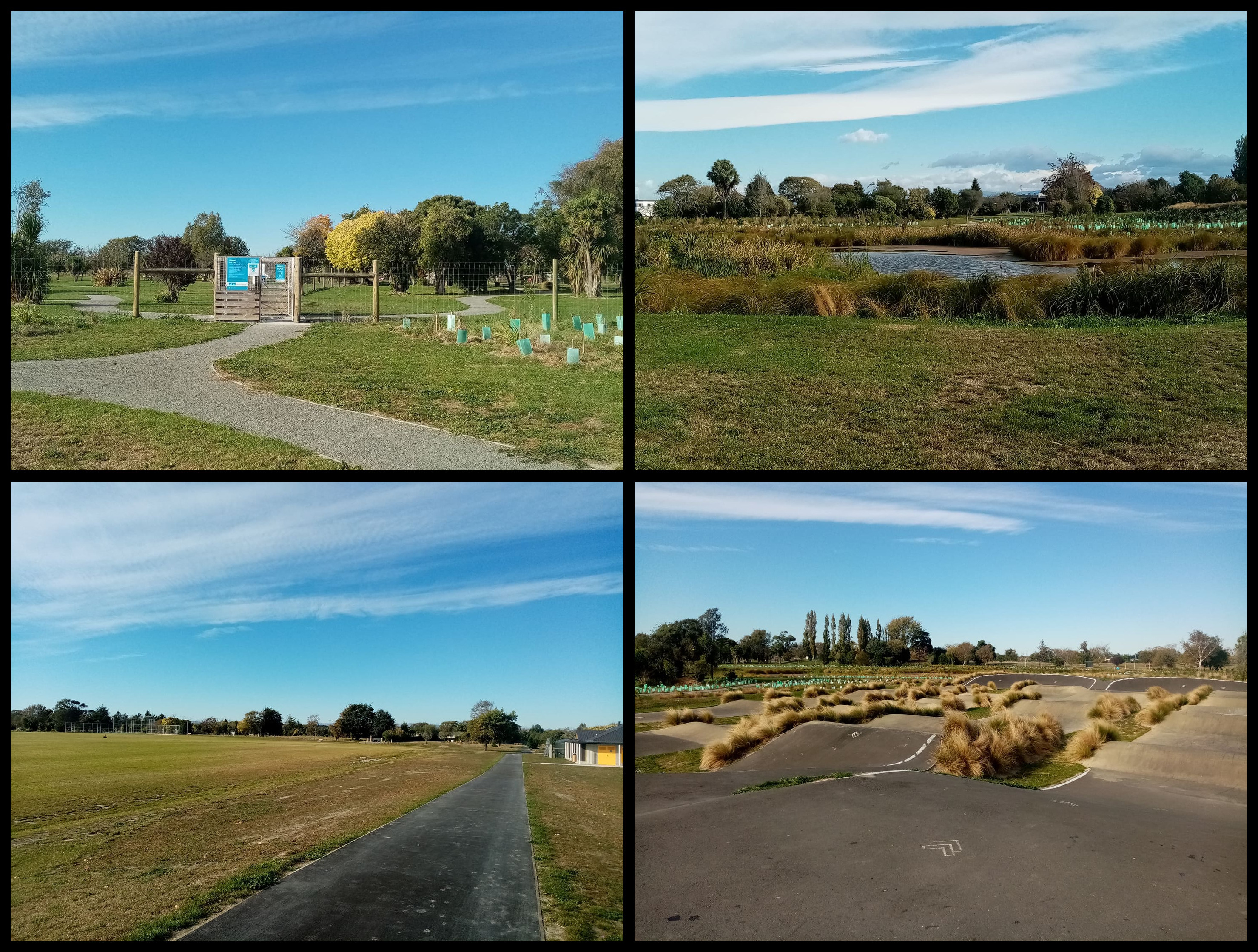
- Areas of Norman Kirk Park – Clockwise from upper left: Kaiapoi Dog Park, Beswick Stormwater Area & The Honda Forest, Sports Fields, and Kaiapoi Community BMX Track
- Interactive map showing location of Norman Kirk Park
- Type: Public park
- Location: Kaiapoi
- Coordinates: 43.38394°S 172.66578°E
- Opened: In stages from May 2019 to September 2020
- Operator: Waimakariri District Council
- Status: Open all year

Norman Kirk Park is a recreational space on the east side of Kaiapoi which is a town in the Waimakariri District of Canterbury, New Zealand. Norman Kirk Park was built on former red zone land that was a residential neighbourhood prior to the Canterbury earthquakes of 2010 and 2011. Norman Kirk Park consists of a dog park, a nature reserve, sports fields, and a BMX track.

== Name ==
Norman Kirk Park is named after Norman Kirk who was the mayor of Kaiapoi from 1953 until 1957. Kirk was elected to the New Zealand Parliament in 1957 and became Leader of the New Zealand Labour Party in 1964. Kirk was elected as the Prime Minister of New Zealand in 1972, a title which he held until his sudden death in 1974.

Norman Kirk Park inherits its name from Kirk Street Reserve which was located east of where Norman Kirk Park is today. Kirk Street Reserve was a small playground and recreational area in a neighbourhood that became a residential red zone. Kirk Street Reserve has since has had its reserve status removed and the land has been received by the Waimakariri District Council.

== Location ==
Norman Kirk Park is less than one kilometre from the centre of Kaiapoi.

The boundaries of Norman Kirk Park are defined by Feldwick Drive to the north, former residential red zone land (now termed a “regeneration area”), Feldwick Drive, Cass Street, and Jollie Street to the east, Charles Street to the south, and Charles Street, former residential red zone land (now termed a “regeneration area”), Cass Street, and Feldwick Drive to the west.

Norman Kirk Park is located on land that was a residential neighbourhood prior to the Canterbury earthquakes of 2010/2011. The entirety of Day Place, Cherry Vale Lane, Cookson Lane, and Beswick Street have been removed to provide land for Norman Kirk Park, along with parts of Gray Crescent, Feldwick Drive, Cass Street, Oram Place, Sewell Street, and Blackwell Crescent (which is no longer a crescent). Nandina Place, Kirk Street, and Jollie Street have minimal overlap with the new Norman Kirk Park but have also been entirely removed.

== History ==
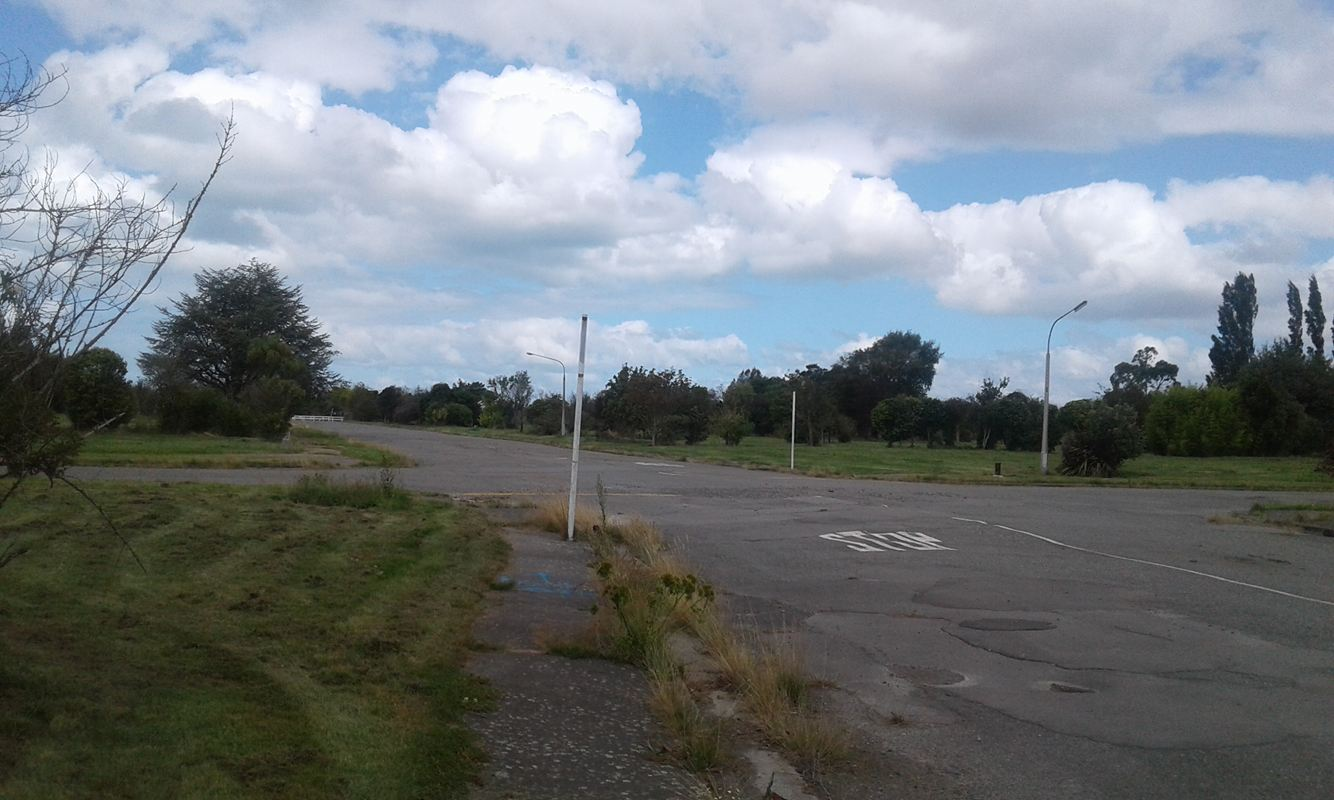
Photo taken on Sewell Street facing east towards Beswick Street within the former Kaiapoi east residential red zone in March 2018

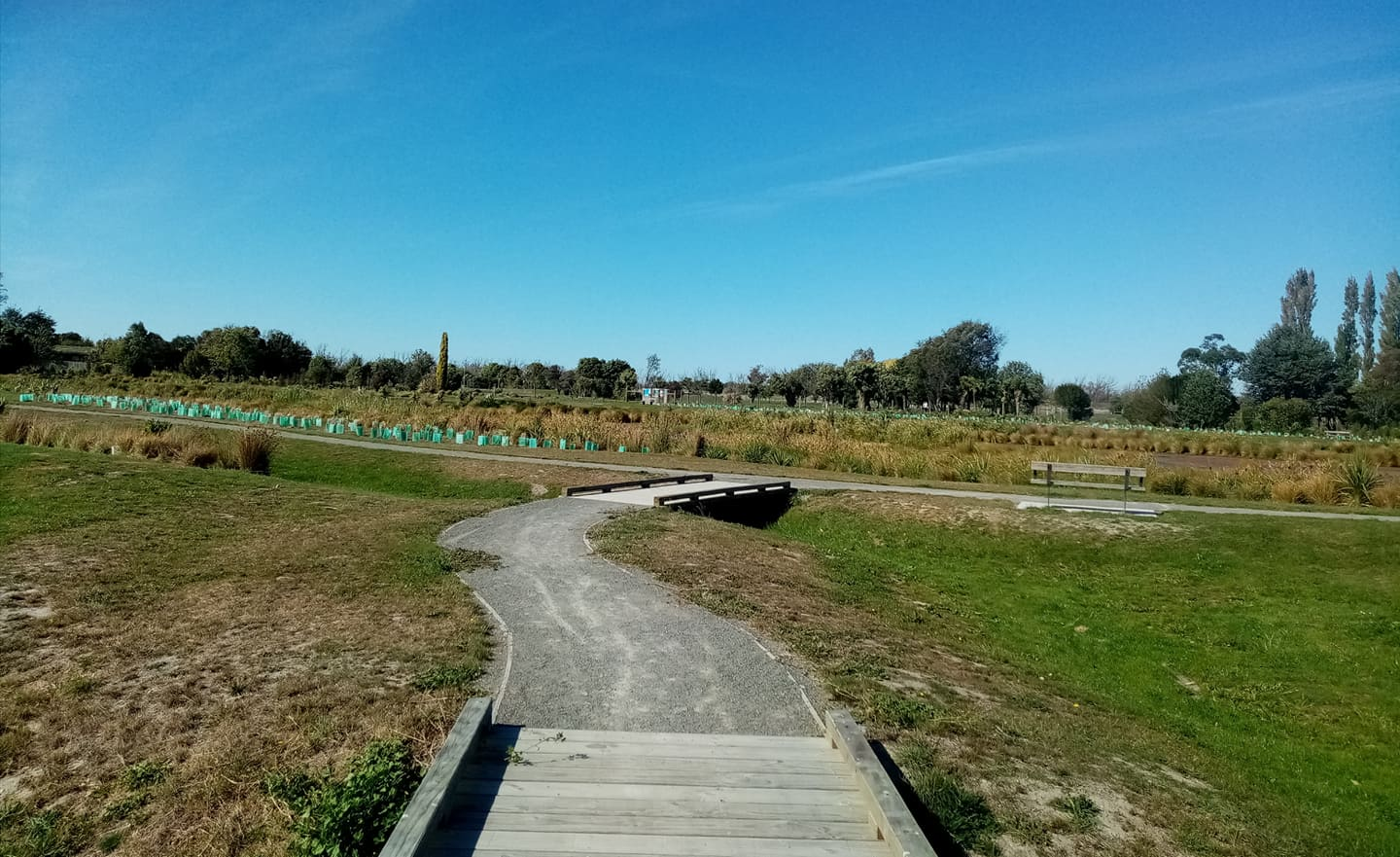
Photo taken in the Honda Forest facing east towards Beswick Stormwater Area in April 2021

Photos were taken in the same place three years apart

Prior to the 2010 Canterbury earthquake and the 2011 Christchurch earthquake the land now occupied by Norman Kirk Park was a residential neighbourhood of Kaiapoi. Earthquake damage was sufficiently severe for Canterbury Earthquake Recovery Authority (CERA) to deem the land unsuitable for rebuilding and therefore classified the area as a residential red zone. Almost all land owners agreed to voluntary buyouts amid considerable controversy, allowing the Crown to take ownership of most of the land. Housing was gradually demolished, rubble cleared away, and the land smoothed with topsoil encourage grass to grow. The majority of preexisting trees remained along with unmaintained infrastructure including earthquake-damaged roads and disconnected streetlights making the land an involuntary park until October 2018.

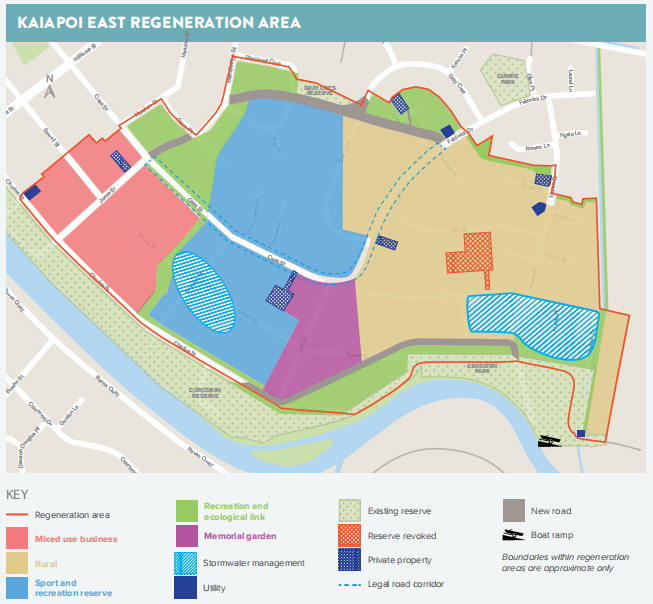
Early plan for Norman Kirk Park outlined in 'Waimakariri Residential Red Zone Recovery Plan/He Mahere Whakarauora i teWhenua Rāhui o Waimakariri' in December 2016

Initial plans for what eventually became Norman Kirk Park were developed from a public engagement process entitled ‘Canvas: your thinking for the red zones’, also known as ‘Canvas’. Canvas ran from 30 July until 12 September 2016. Canvas was led by CERA and supported by the Waimakariri District Council, Ngāi Tahu, the Canterbury Regional Council, the Christchurch City Council, and the Selwyn District Council. Canvas asked locals for ideas about how the Crown could convert the residential red zone land within the Waimakariri District into public recreational, environmental, and cultural facilities. Community suggestions for land use in Kaiapoi included parks, a dog park, playgrounds, a skate park, walking and cycling tracks, sports grounds, a BMX track, community gardens, fruit forests, nature reserves with native plants, signage commemorating the streets that previously occupied the land, and for existing trees and shrubs to remain when possible. The specific design of what would later become Norman Kirk Park was gradually developed through a series of discussion documents, public engagement processes, and public hearings between October 2015 and April 2016. On 1 August 2016 the Waimakariri District Council submitted a ‘Draft Waimakariri Residential Red Zone Recovery Plan/Te Mahere Whakarauora mō te Whenua Rāhui o Waimakariri’ to the Greater Christchurch Group which presented the document for further public feedback in August 2016. In December 2016, the Greater Christchurch Group approved the Waimakariri Residential Red Zone Recovery Plan/He Mahere Whakarauora i teWhenua Rāhui o Waimakariri.

The next major development in the genesis of Norman Kirk Park took place on 15 June 2018 when the Crown officially returned the Waimakariri District residential red zone to local control by selling the land to the Waimakariri District Council for $1 and an agreement that any future profits from the land must be shared with the Crown. The Waimakariri District Council released a document entitled ‘Draft Reserves Master Plan: Kaiapoi Regeneration Areas’ in September 2018 which mapped out the sports fields, stormwater area, dog park, and BMX track that later formed Norman Kirk Park. This document explained that the Waimakariri District residential red zones would no longer be referred to as ‘red zones’ as they were now ‘regeneration areas’. Old roads and other infrastructure were removed from the further Norman Kirk Park site in October 2018 and construction began for the creation of the sports fields and Beswick stormwater area.

Norman Kirk Park received its name on 20 September 2019 with approval from the Kaiapoi-Tuahiwi Community Board.

On 9 November 2019 the Waimakariri District Council was announced to be the overall winner in the 2019 Commonwealth Association of Planners (CAP) Awards for the body of work that went into producing the ‘Draft Reserves Master Plan: Kaiapoi Regeneration Areas’ document and similar work addressing the nearby The Pines Beach and Kairaki residential red zones. Judges described the project as being a model example of disaster recovery and community resilience.

All areas of Norman Kirk Park were open to the public by September 2020.

As of 11 April 2021, Google Street View shows how the land that became Norman Kirk Park appeared in August 2012 when the area was still an earthquake-damaged residential neighbourhood earmarked for demolition.

== Future plans ==
The Waimakariri District Council has plans to install fitness equipment around the outside of the sports fields with distance markers along the pathway.
