= George Maber =

- Born: 2 November 1869 Kaiapoi, New Zealand
- Died: 17 December 1894 (aged 25) Coolgardie, Australia
- Weight: 78 kg (172 lb)

Rugby union career
- Position: Forward
Amateur team(s)
Years	Team	Apps	(Points)
1893—94	Petone		
Provincial / State sides
Years	Team	Apps	(Points)
1893—94	Wellington		
International career
Years	Team	Apps	(Points)
1894	New Zealand		

George Maber (2 November 1869 – 17 December 1894) was a New Zealand rugby union player who represented the All Blacks in 1894. His position of choice was forward. Maber did not play in any test matches as New Zealand did not play their first until 1903.

== Career ==
Maber was described as "wiry built".

He played only two seasons of 1st-class rugby.

Although born in Kaiapoi, Maber played all of his club rugby for the Petone club in Wellington.

He was in the Wellington provincial side between 1893 and 1894.

After playing for his province against the touring New South Wales side in 1894, Maber was selected for the All Blacks to play in the unofficial "test" match which was also played on the tour. The match was lost 8-6.

This would be his only All Black appearance.

Because of his excellent showing in 1894 Maber received a trophy from the Petone club.

== Personal and death ==
Surprisingly Maber left for Australia. He then became severely ill after developing typhoid. He died in Coolgardie, Western Australia at the age of just 25.

Coolgardie, at the time was a major mining site for gold. Although it was more than likely he left because of the gold digging no evidence has ever been found to indicate this was the reason for the sudden move, which ultimately ended his promising career.

He was buried at Coolgardie Cemetery, in the Wesleyan section.

Maber may have changed his name to John, and is suggested to have died on 18 December.
