= Cust River =

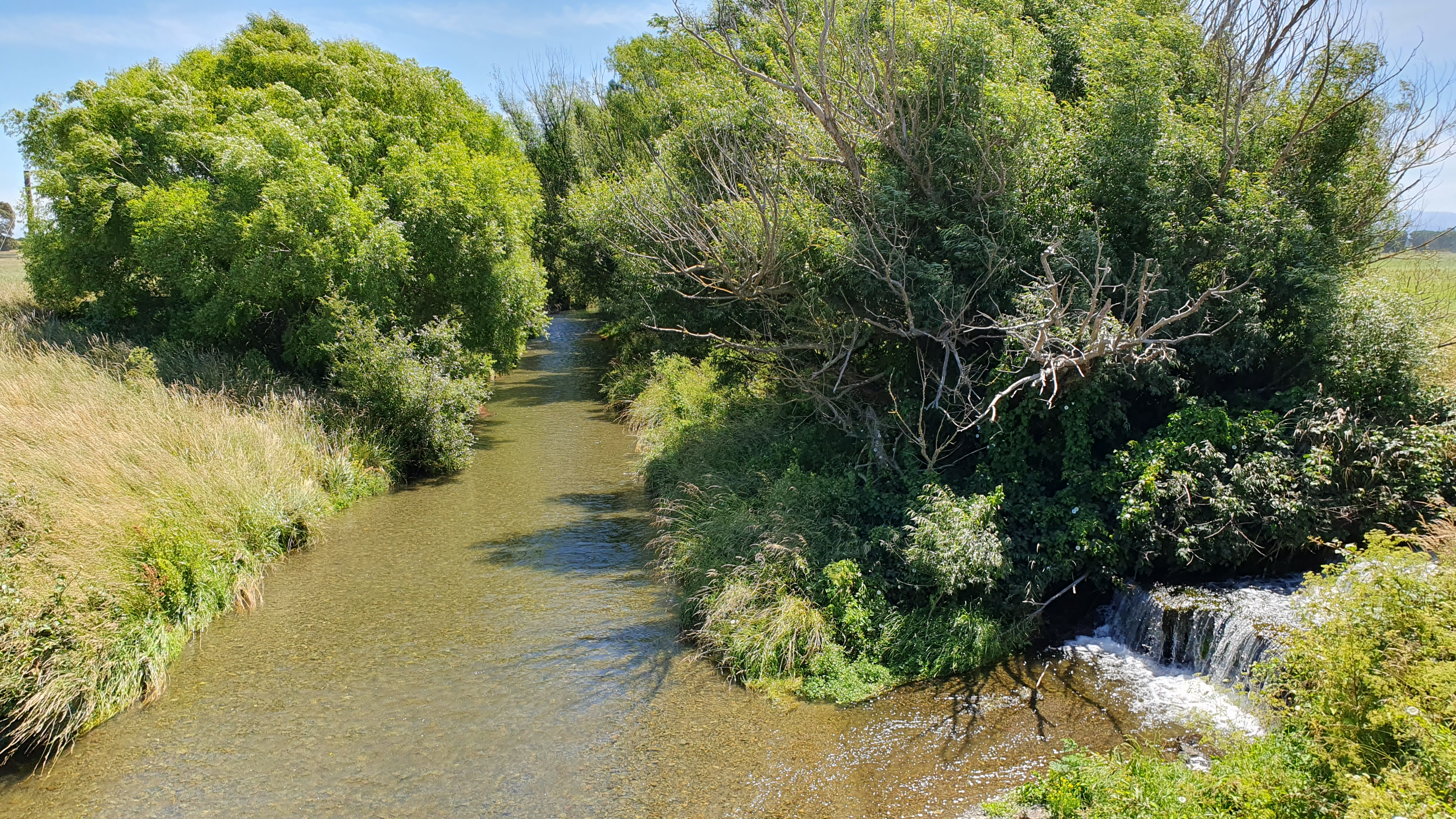

Location
- Country: New Zealand

Physical characteristics
- Source
  - location: Canterbury Plains
- Mouth
  - location: Cam River / Ruataniwha
  - coordinates: 43°22′26″S 172°38′04″E
- Length: 51 km (32 mi)

The Cust River is a river in the Canterbury region of New Zealand. It flows east across the upper Canterbury Plains from its source north of the town of Oxford, New Zealand, flowing into the Cam River / Ruataniwha close to the town of Rangiora. The small town of Cust lies on the banks of the river. The lower part of the river, to the south-west of Rangiora, is diverted into a channel and called the "Main Drain". The channel was built in 1862 to drain the swampy land between Rangiora and the Waimakariri River, and when it was enlarged in 1868 it accidentally captured the Cust.

The river was named in 1849 after Sir Edward Cust, a member of the Canterbury Association.

Brown trout spawn in the river and are suitable for fishing in spring.

== See also ==
- List of rivers of New Zealand
