= William Balch =

New Zealand rugby union player and school principal (1871–1949)

- Born: 17 October 1871 Kaiapoi, New Zealand
- Died: 4 April 1949 (aged 77) Christchurch, New Zealand
- University: Canterbury University College
- Occupation(s): Schoolteacher, school inspector

Rugby union career
- Position: Wing three-quarter
Amateur team(s)
Years	Team	Apps	(Points)
1890–92	University		
1894–99	Kaiapoi		
Provincial / State sides
Years	Team	Apps	(Points)
1890–94, 98–99	Canterbury		
International career
Years	Team	Apps	(Points)
1894	New Zealand	0	(0)

William Balch (17 October 1871 – 4 April 1949) was a New Zealand teacher who lived and taught in Christchurch and the surrounding Canterbury province. Balch played rugby union, including for the national team in 1894, his position of choice was wing three-quarter.

== Early life, family and teaching career ==
Born in Kaiapoi on 17 October 1871, Balch was the son of Enoch and Maria Balch. He was educated in Kaiapoi and served as a pupil-teacher there for five years. After two years' training at Christchurch Normal School, he did relief teaching for a few months, and then was an assistant teacher at Warwick House in Christchurch. He then worked for 18 months as assistant master at Papanui and then became headmaster at McKenzie Public School at Cheviot in January 1895.

Balch married Janet Campbell Simson in December 1899. He later graduated from Canterbury University College with a Bachelor of Arts in 1912. He went on to become headmaster of Shirley School, and later was a school inspector. He also wrote an English textbook, Sentence structure and hints on composition, that was used in New Zealand primary schools.

== Rugby union ==
A wing three-quarter, Balch represented the University club in Christchurch between 1890 and 1892. He then transferred to the Kaiapoi club in 1894. Balch represented Canterbury between 1890 and 1899, although he did not make any provincial appearances in the 1895, 1896 or 1897 seasons.

Balch played one game for the New Zealand national team, a match against the touring New South Wales team at Lancaster Park, Christchurch, in 1894. Balch, known as an excellent goal-kicker, was assigned the kicking duties in this game, but he was unable to convert either of New Zealand's two tries, which was a factor in the 8–6 loss, and he was never selected for the national side again. Balch also turned out for Canterbury side that defeated New South Wales by 11 points to 3, scoring a try and conversion. Balch did not play in any test matches as New Zealand did not play their first full international until 1903.

Also well known as an athlete Balch was described as "a great three-quarter, a flyer on both the track and field". He was also a noted authority on growing daffodils.

== Death ==
Balch died in Christchurch on 4 April 1949.
