= Waimakariri =

Waimakariri may refer to:

- Waimakariri District
- Waimakariri District Council
- Waimakariri Gorge
- Waimakariri United AFC
- Waimakariri (New Zealand electorate)
- Waimakariri River
- Waimakariri River Regional Park
