= Cam River (Canterbury) =

Cam River / Ruataniwha
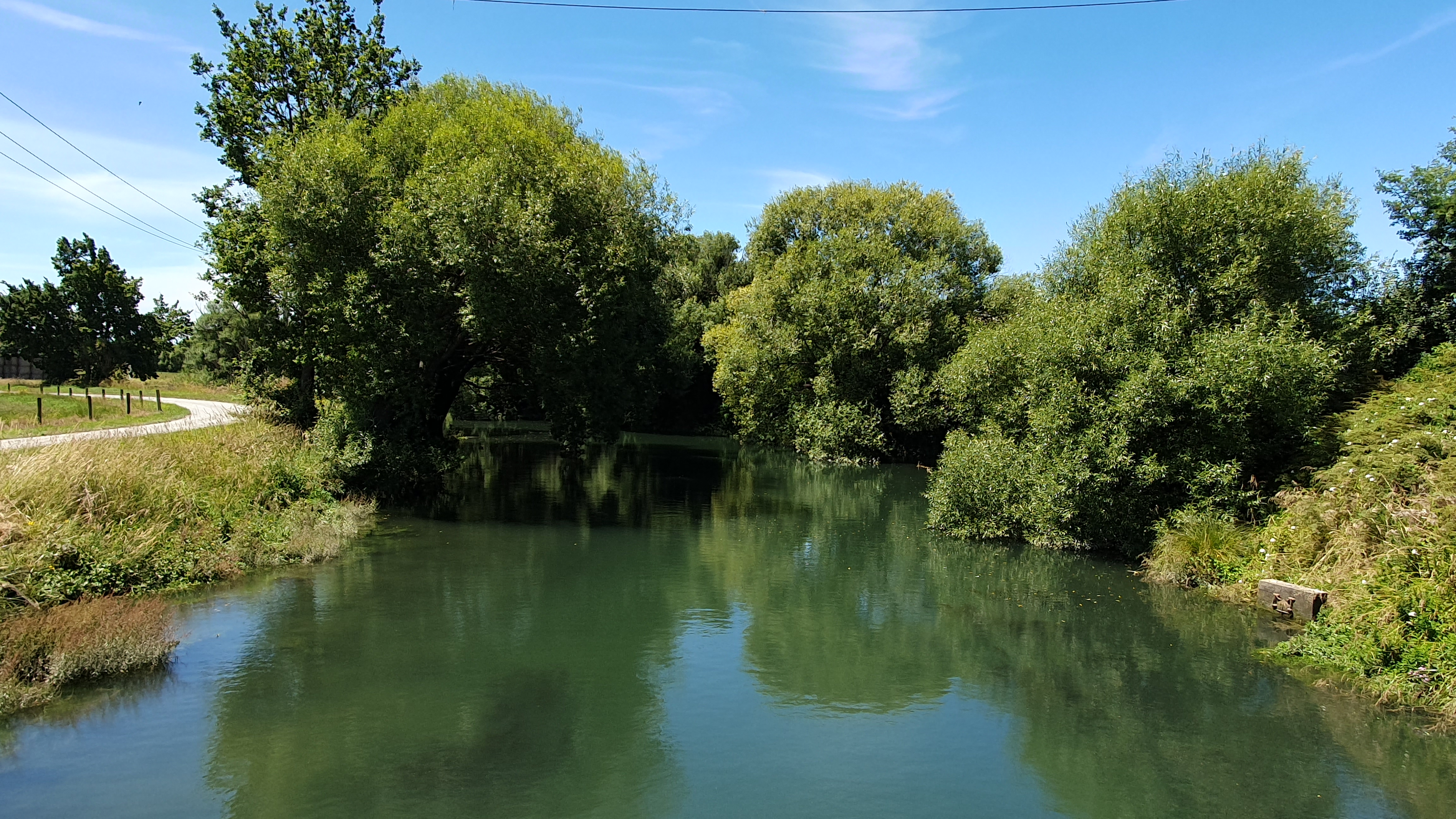
- Native name: Ruataniwha (Māori)

Location
- Country: New Zealand
- Region: Canterbury
- District: Waimakariri District

Physical characteristics
- Source
  - location: Rangiora
  - coordinates: 43.3000°S 172.608°E
- Mouth: Kaiapoi River
  - location: Kaiapoi
  - coordinates: 43°22′34.77″S 172°39′8.25″E

Basin features
- River system: Waimakariri River

The Cam River / Ruataniwha is a small river in Canterbury in the South Island of New Zealand. It is a tributary of the Kaiapoi River, itself a tributary of the Waimakariri River.

The Cam / Ruataniwha rises just to the east of the town of Rangiora and flows south across the Canterbury Plains towards Kaiapoi. It has two named tributaries, North Brook and South Brook, both of which rise in Rangiora, plus several unnamed streams and drainage canals.

The river's official name was changed from Cam River to the dual name Cam River / Ruataniwha by the Ngai Tahu Claims Settlement Act 1998. The Cam river holds a small population of Brown trout and Chinook salmon, with its tributaries spawning grounds for the trout and salmon mostly in the North Brook and South Brook stream, Middle Brook is silted so any trout in the stream do not spawn.
