= Waimakariri River Regional Park =

Regional park in Canterbury, New Zealand

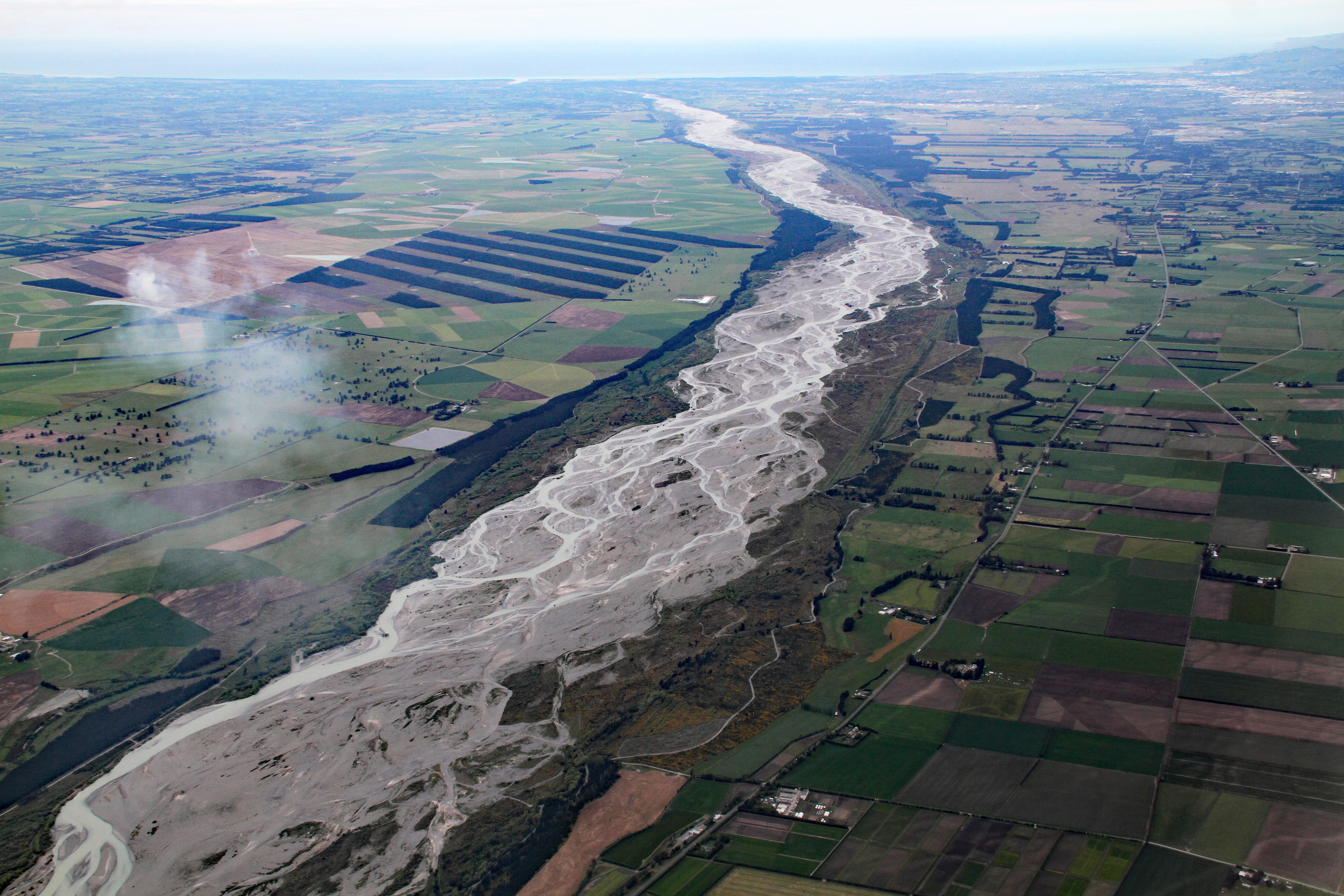
- Aerial photograph of Waimakariri River

- Location within South Island
- Location: New Zealand
- Coordinates: 43.436°S 172.574°E
- Area: 15,000 hectares (37,000 acres)

Waimakariri River Regional Park is a regional park in the Canterbury Region of New Zealand's South Island. It covers 15,000 hectares (37,000 acres) on the banks of the Waimakariri River, and is operated by Environment Canterbury.

== History ==
Waimakariri was once a vast and unconstrained braided river that overflowed surrounding land, but has been contained by European settlement. The park was created as a way of managing Environment Canterbury's river protection land along the length of the entire river.

In July 2013, two decapitated dogs and household rubbish was dumped in the regional park between McLeans and Coutts Islands. In October of that year, a group broke into the Baynons Brake section of the park, dumping litter and causing damage.

Parts of the park were closed due to flooding in June 2021.

== Park sections ==
The park is divided into different sections for different uses

- McLeans Forest is a forest with four loops for mountain biking, walking and running totally 17 kilometres in length.
- West Melton Forest is a 350 hectares (860 acres) forest suitable recreational horse-riding, horse-carriage driving, walking and running. It consists of alternating flood protection forestry blocks alternating with open grassland. The forest is mostly exotic trees, there are scattered willow and poplar trees, some sold remnant kōwhai and kānuka, and several bird orchids and other ground orchids. Firefighting waterholes and burrow pits provide a habitat for some native plats and animals, and the Waimakariri river bed is an important breeding area for threatened river birds, such as the black-fronted tern and wrybill.
- Kaiapoi Island is ab area for motocross, whitebaiting, fishing, mountain biking, picnicking, swimming, kayaking and jet boating. It is accessible via Kaiapoi and is closed overnight. The site includes saltmarsh, relict saltmarsh and freshwater wetland, and is situated alongside the Kainga, Stewart's Gully and Brooklands communities.
- Te Rauakaaka is an area including the Waimakariri River saltmarsh and Styx rivermouth, suitable for walking and bird-watching.
- Baynons Brake is a recreation area suitable for horse riding, walking, picnicking and fishing. It covers about five kilometres of riverside land between the Eyre Diversion River and Kaiapoi Island. There is regenerating native plants like lemonwood, titoki, wineberry, New Zealand fuchsia, five finger and several Coprosma species. They provide a habitat for bird species like fantail / powakawaka, bellbird / korimako, grey warbler / Riroriro and kingfisher / kotare. There is occasional tomtit / miromiro, pipit / pihoihoi visit in spring, and marsh crake / koitareke can sometimes be heard at night. The riverbed birds include wrybill / ngutuparore, Black-billed Gull, black-fronted tern / tarapirohe, white-fronted tern / tara and the banded dotterel.
- McIntoshs is an area for picnicking, fishing and whitebaiting, with wheelchair access and a blind anglers' fishing platform.
- Templars Island is a large freshwater swamp with regenerating native plants, bird life, and a walking and cycling track.
- The Willows is an area for walking, cycling and fishing.
- Weedons Forest is an area for trail bikers and other non-motorised recreation.
