= Matiaha Tiramōrehu =

Matiaha Tiramōrehu (?–1881) was a New Zealand tribal leader, teacher, land protester and assessor. Of Māori descent, he identified with the Ngāi Tahu iwi. He was born in Kaiapoi, North Canterbury, New Zealand. In 1849 only one year after Ngāi Tahu and Henry Kemp made the Canterbury land deal Tiramorehu started pursuing a formal grievance to the Crown (the New Zealand Government) not upholding their end of the deal. This was continued by almost every Ngāi Tahu leader until the 1990s.
