= Woodend Beach =

Rural settlement in Canterbury, New Zealand

- Rural settlement
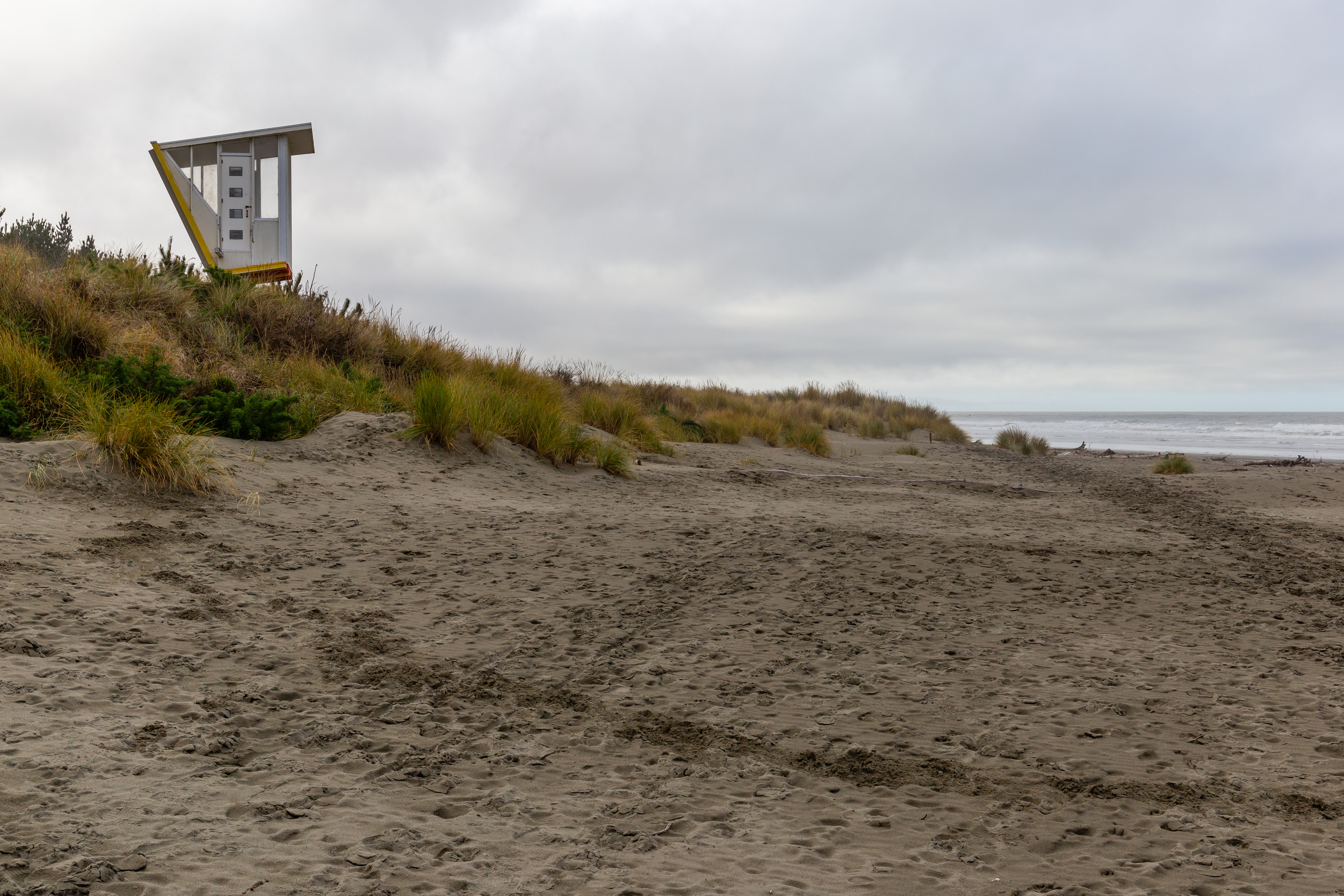
- Woodend Beach - Tūhaitara Coastal Park
- Interactive map of Woodend Beach
- Coordinates: 43°20′13.41″S 172°42′10.43″E
- Country: New Zealand
- Region: Canterbury
- Territorial authority: Waimakariri District
- Ward: Kaiapoi-Woodend Ward
- Community: Woodend-Sefton Community
- Electorates: Waimakariri; Te Tai Tonga (Māori)

Government
  - Territorial Authority: Waimakariri District Council
  - Regional council: Environment Canterbury
  - Mayor of Waimakariri: Dan Gordon
  - Waimakariri MP: Matt Doocey
  - Te Tai Tonga MP: Tākuta Ferris

Area
  - Total: 2.62 km^{2} (1.01 sq mi)

Population (June 2025)
  - Total: 230
  - Density: 88/km^{2} (230/sq mi)
- Time zone: UTC+12 (NZST)
  - Summer (DST): UTC+13 (NZDT)
- Postcode: 7691
- Area code: 03

Woodend Beach is a small rural community in the Waimakariri District, New Zealand. The beach is part of Pegasus Bay.

== Demographics ==
Woodend Beach is described by Stats NZ as a rural settlement, which covers 2.62 km^{2} (1.01 sq mi). It had an estimated population of 230 as of June 2025, with a population density of 88 people per km^{2}. It is part of the larger Pegasus Bay statistical area.

Historical population
Year	Pop.	±% p.a.
2006	204	—
2013	243	+2.53%
2018	264	+1.67%
2023	225	−3.15%

Woodend Beach had a population of 225 in the 2023 New Zealand census, a decrease of 39 people (−14.8%) since the 2018 census, and a decrease of 18 people (−7.4%) since the 2013 census. There were 123 males and 102 females in 102 dwellings. 2.7% of people identified as LGBTIQ+. The median age was 44.4 years (compared with 38.1 years nationally). There were 42 people (18.7%) aged under 15 years, 24 (10.7%) aged 15 to 29, 114 (50.7%) aged 30 to 64, and 42 (18.7%) aged 65 or older.

People could identify as more than one ethnicity. The results were 93.3% European (Pākehā), 8.0% Māori, 2.7% Asian, and 8.0% other, which includes people giving their ethnicity as "New Zealander". English was spoken by 97.3%, Māori by 1.3%, and other languages by 5.3%. No language could be spoken by 2.7% (e.g. too young to talk). New Zealand Sign Language was known by 1.3%. The percentage of people born overseas was 13.3, compared with 28.8% nationally.

Religious affiliations were 28.0% Christian, 2.7% New Age, and 1.3% other religions. People who answered that they had no religion were 60.0%, and 8.0% of people did not answer the census question.

Of those at least 15 years old, 33 (18.0%) people had a bachelor's or higher degree, 108 (59.0%) had a post-high school certificate or diploma, and 42 (23.0%) people exclusively held high school qualifications. The median income was $43,800, compared with $41,500 nationally. 12 people (6.6%) earned over $100,000 compared to 12.1% nationally. The employment status of those at least 15 was 96 (52.5%) full-time, 24 (13.1%) part-time, and 6 (3.3%) unemployed.
