= Frank Rapley =

New Zealand cricketer

Personal information
- Full name: Arthur Frank Rapley
- Born: 2 September 1937 (age 89); Kaiapoi, New Zealand
- Batting: Left-handed
- Bowling: Right-arm off-spin
- Relatives: Fraser Sheat (grandson)

Domestic team information
- Years: Team
- 1957/58–1959/60: Canterbury

Career statistics
Competition	FC
Matches	8
Runs scored	102
Batting average	25.50
100s/50s	0/0
Top score	40
Balls bowled	1425
Wickets	23
Bowling average	20.43
5 wickets in innings	1
10 wickets in match	0
Best bowling	6/73
Catches/stumpings	4/–
- Source: Cricinfo, 20 November 2018

Arthur Frank Rapley (born 2 September 1937) is a former New Zealand cricketer who played first-class cricket for Canterbury from 1958 to 1960.

== Cricket career ==
An off-spin bowler and useful lower-order batsman, Rapley played his first match for Canterbury at the age of 20 in the last round of the Plunket Shield in 1957–58 and took four wickets (match figures of 35–15–60–4). He was selected in the trial match for South Island a few days later and took two wickets cheaply.

He took only eight wickets in five matches in 1958–59. However, he made his highest first-class score of 40 in Canterbury's victory over Central Districts, when he and Graham Dowling added 85 for the last wicket, Dowling finishing on 103 not out.

Rapley did not play in Canterbury's first four Plunket Shield matches in 1959–60 but, restored to the team for their final match, he was the leading bowler in Canterbury's victory over Northern Districts, taking 3 for 54 and 6 for 73 (match figures of 78.1–30–127–9). This victory, achieved at the last possible moment of the match, gained Canterbury the 1959–60 Plunket Shield. But it was Rapley's last first-class match.

Rapley played for North Canterbury in the Hawke Cup from 1963 to 1983. In all he played 65 matches for North Canterbury, taking 209 wickets. In a two-day match for West Coast against Buller in 1960–61 he took 8 for 11 and 5 for 33.

== Later life ==
Rapley has spent most of his life in the North Canterbury region, where he was born. He was assistant town clerk for the Rangiora Borough Council in the 1970s, and was one of the first trustees of the North Canterbury Sport & Recreation Trust after it was established in 1982. He served as a justice of the peace in Rangiora until 2007.

His grandson Fraser Sheat has played for Canterbury since the 2017–18 season.
