= Isabel Button =

Horse driver and trainer, equestrian (1863–1921)

Isabel Button (9 October 1863 – 7 February 1921) was a New Zealand horse driver, trainer and equestrian. She was born in Kaiapoi, North Canterbury, New Zealand on 9 October 1863.
