= Kairaki =

Settlement in Canterbury, New Zealand

- Beach/rural area
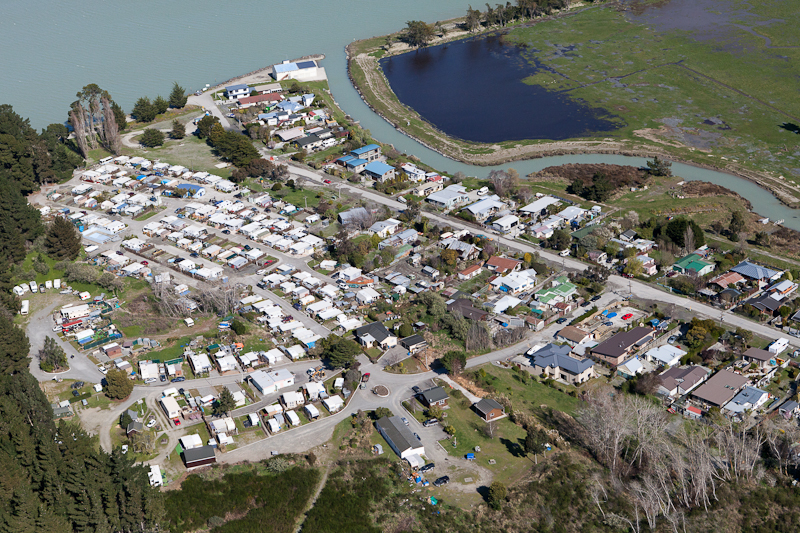
- Kairaki on the north bank of the Waimakariri River
- Interactive map of Kairaki
- Coordinates: 43.386°S 172.703°E
- Country: New Zealand
- Region: Canterbury
- Territorial authority: Waimakariri District
- Ward: Kaiapoi-Woodend Ward
- Community: Kaiapoi-Tuahiwi Community
- Electorates: Waimakariri; Te Tai Tonga (Māori)

Government
  - Territorial Authority: Waimakariri District Council
  - Regional council: Environment Canterbury
  - Mayor of Waimakariri: Dan Gordon
  - Waimakariri MP: Matt Doocey
  - Te Tai Tonga MP: Tākuta Ferris

Area
  - Total: 9.59 km^{2} (3.70 sq mi)

Population (2023 census)
  - Total: 159
  - Density: 16.6/km^{2} (42.9/sq mi)
- Time zone: UTC+12 (NZST)
  - Summer (DST): UTC+13 (NZDT)
- Postcode: 7630
- Area code: 03

Kairaki is a small rural community in the Waimakariri District, New Zealand. It is on Pegasus Bay and on the north bank of the Waimakariri River mouth.

The New Zealand Ministry for Culture and Heritage gives a translation of "sky eater" for Kairaki.

== Demographics ==
Kairaki locality covers 9.59 km^{2} (3.70 sq mi) and surrounds but does not include The Pines Beach. It is part of the larger Pegasus Bay statistical area.

Historical population
| Year | Pop. | ±% p.a. |
|---|---|---|
| 2006 | 225 | — |
| 2013 | 162 | −4.58% |
| 2018 | 153 | −1.14% |
| 2023 | 159 | +0.77% |
The 2006 population is for a smaller area of 0.88 km^{2}. Source:

Kairaki had a population of 159 in the 2023 New Zealand census, an increase of 6 people (3.9%) since the 2018 census, and a decrease of 3 people (−1.9%) since the 2013 census. There were 84 males and 75 females in 114 dwellings. 5.7% of people identified as LGBTIQ+. The median age was 61.9 years (compared with 38.1 years nationally). There were 6 people (3.8%) aged under 15 years, 15 (9.4%) aged 15 to 29, 75 (47.2%) aged 30 to 64, and 63 (39.6%) aged 65 or older.

People could identify as more than one ethnicity. The results were 92.5% European (Pākehā), and 7.5% Māori. English was spoken by 100.0%, Māori by 1.9%, and other languages by 5.7%. No language could be spoken by 1.9% (e.g. too young to talk). The percentage of people born overseas was 13.2, compared with 28.8% nationally.

Religious affiliations were 22.6% Christian, 1.9% Māori religious beliefs, 1.9% New Age, and 1.9% other religions. People who answered that they had no religion were 66.0%, and 7.5% of people did not answer the census question.

Of those at least 15 years old, 12 (7.8%) people had a bachelor's or higher degree, 69 (45.1%) had a post-high school certificate or diploma, and 69 (45.1%) people exclusively held high school qualifications. The median income was $28,200, compared with $41,500 nationally. 6 people (3.9%) earned over $100,000 compared to 12.1% nationally. The employment status of those at least 15 was 51 (33.3%) full-time and 27 (17.6%) part-time.

== Climate ==
The average temperature in summer is 16.2 °C, and in winter is 6.4 °C.

| Month | Normal temperature |
|---|---|
| January | 16.7 °C |
| February | 16.3 °C |
| March | 15.0 °C |
| April | 12.1 °C |
| May | 8.8 °C |
| June | 6.3 °C |
| July | 5.8 °C |
| August | 7.1 °C |
| September | 9.4 °C |
| October | 11.4 °C |
| November | 13.5 °C |
| December | 15.5 °C |
