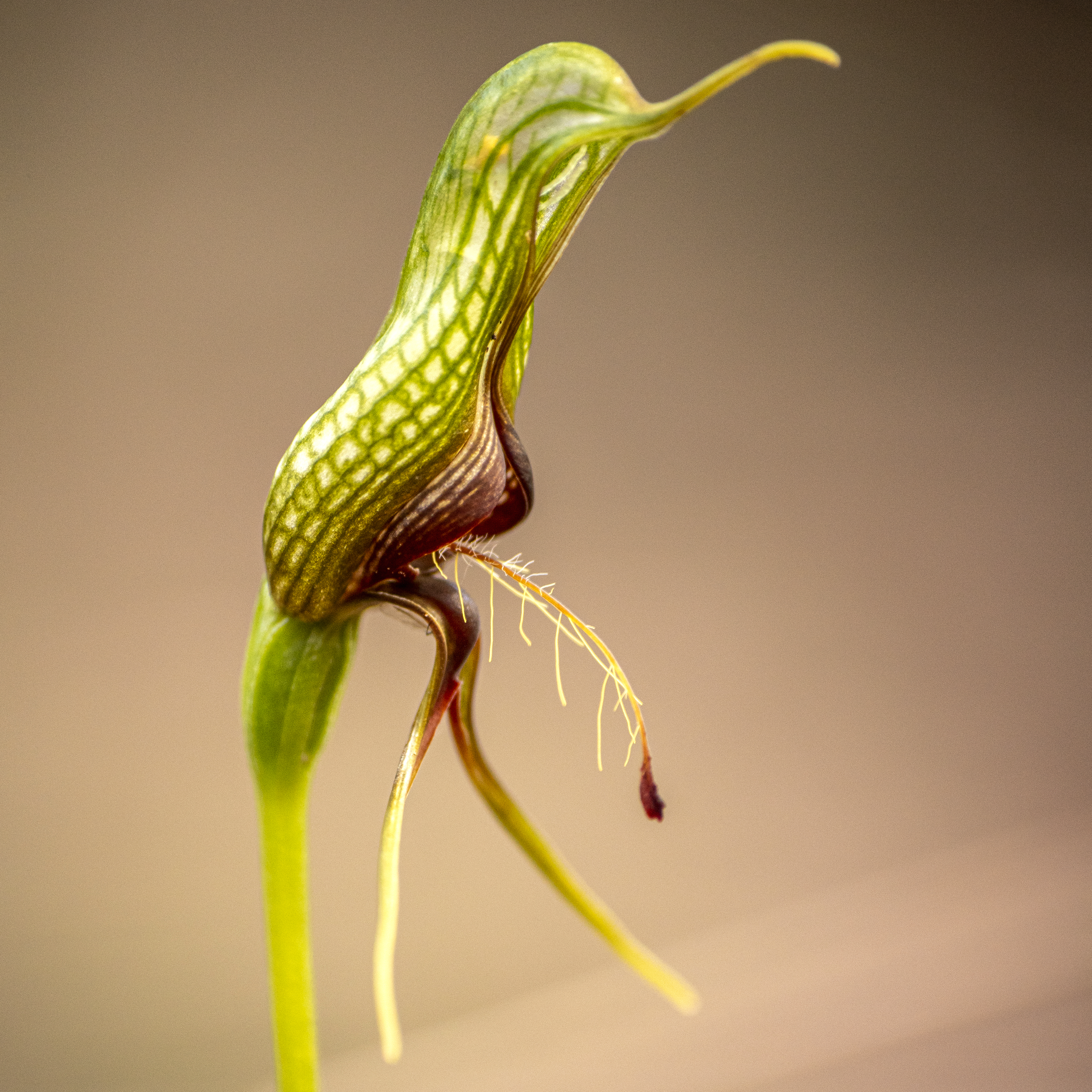

Scientific classification
- Kingdom: Plantae
- Clade: Tracheophytes
- Clade: Angiosperms
- Clade: Monocots
- Order: Asparagales
- Family: Orchidaceae
- Subfamily: Orchidoideae
- Tribe: Cranichideae
- Genus: Pterostylis
- Species: P. barbata

Binomial name
- Pterostylis barbata Lindl.

Synonyms
- Plumatichilos barbata Szlach. orth. var.; Plumatichilos barbatus (Lindl.) Szlach.

= Pterostylis barbata =

Western bearded greenhood

Species of orchid

Pterostylis barbata, commonly known as western bearded greenhood or bird orchid is a species of orchid endemic to the south-west of Western Australia. Flowering plants have a rosette of leaves at the base of the plant and a single translucent white flower with dark green veins on a flowering stem with up to 20 stem leaves. It is one of a number of bearded orchids, some of which have yet to be formally described, all of which have a distinctive feather-like labellum.

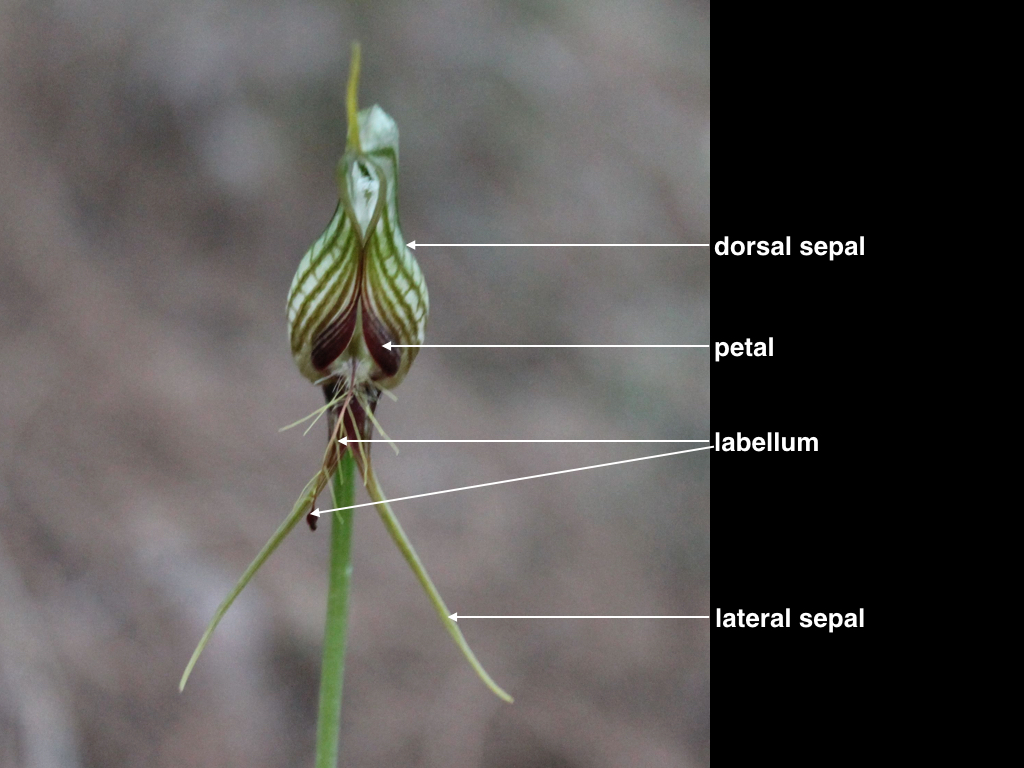
Labelled image of Pterostylis barbata

== Description ==
Pterostylis barbata is a terrestrial, perennial, deciduous, herb with an underground tuber and when not flowering, a rosette of stalkless, pointed leaves. Flowering plants have a similar rosette and between ten and twenty stem leaves. The leaves are 15–45 mm (0.6–2 in) long, 10–12 mm (0.4–0.5 in) wide and dark green with pale areas. There is usually only a single flower 55–65 mm (2–3 in) long and 12–14 mm (0.5–0.6 in) wide on a flowering stem 200–350 mm (8–10 in) tall. The flower leans slightly forward and is shiny, pale translucent green with darker green veins and purple-brown markings at the front. The dorsal sepal and petals are fused, forming a hood or "galea" over the column and the dorsal sepal has a thin point 10–15 mm (0.4–0.6 in) long. The lateral sepals are joined at their bases which are dark reddish and the free part is narrow, green and 25–30 mm (0.98–1.2 in) long. The labellum is 22–25 mm (0.9–1 in) long and feather-like with a few pale yellow, thread-like branches and a dark brown knob on the end. Flowering occurs from July to September.

== Taxonomy and naming ==
Pterostylis barbata was first formally described in 1840 by John Lindley and the description was published in A Sketch of the Vegetation of the Swan River Colony. The specific epithet (barbata) is a Latin word meaning "bearded".

== Distribution and habitat ==
Western bearded orchid grows in shrubby woodland and forest, often in thick Casuarina leaf litter and often in small clumps. It occurs between Bindoon and Albany and is common in the Darling Range near Perth. Its range includes the Avon Wheatbelt, Esperance Plains, Jarrah Forest, Mallee, Swan Coastal Plain and Warren biogeographic regions.

There are twelve undescribed species of Pterostylis in Western Australia and the range of this species may be redefined when those descriptions are published.

== Conservation ==
Pterostylis barbata is classified as "not threatened" by the Western Australian Government Department of Parks and Wildlife.
