= Kaiapoi River =

Coordinates: 43.390004°S 172.678217°E

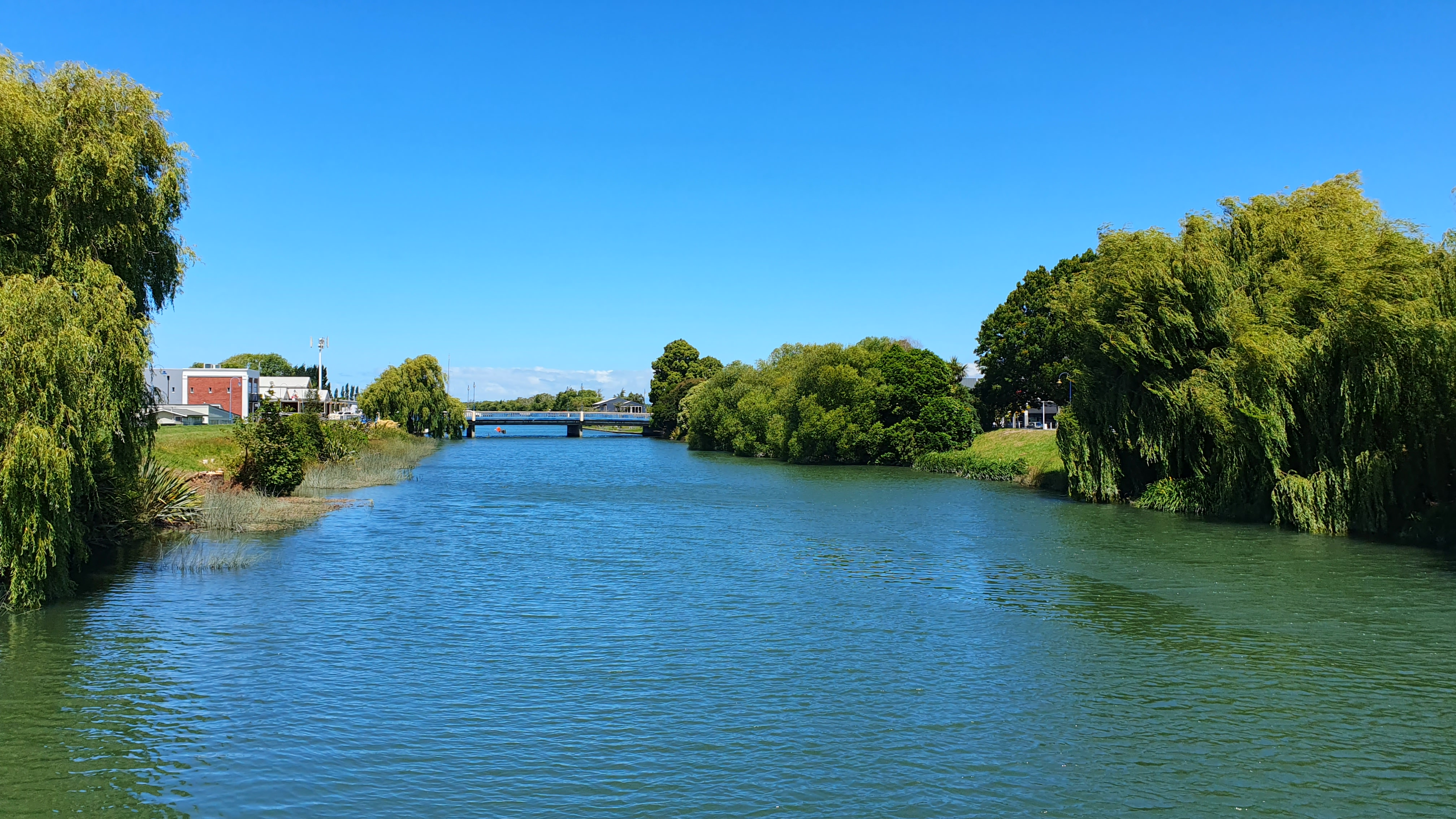
- Looking downstream on the Kaiapoi River

- Location of the mouth within New Zealand

Location
- Country: New Zealand

Physical characteristics
- Mouth
  - location: Waimakariri River
- Length: 16 km (9.9 mi)
- Basin size: 430 km^{2} (170 mi^{2})

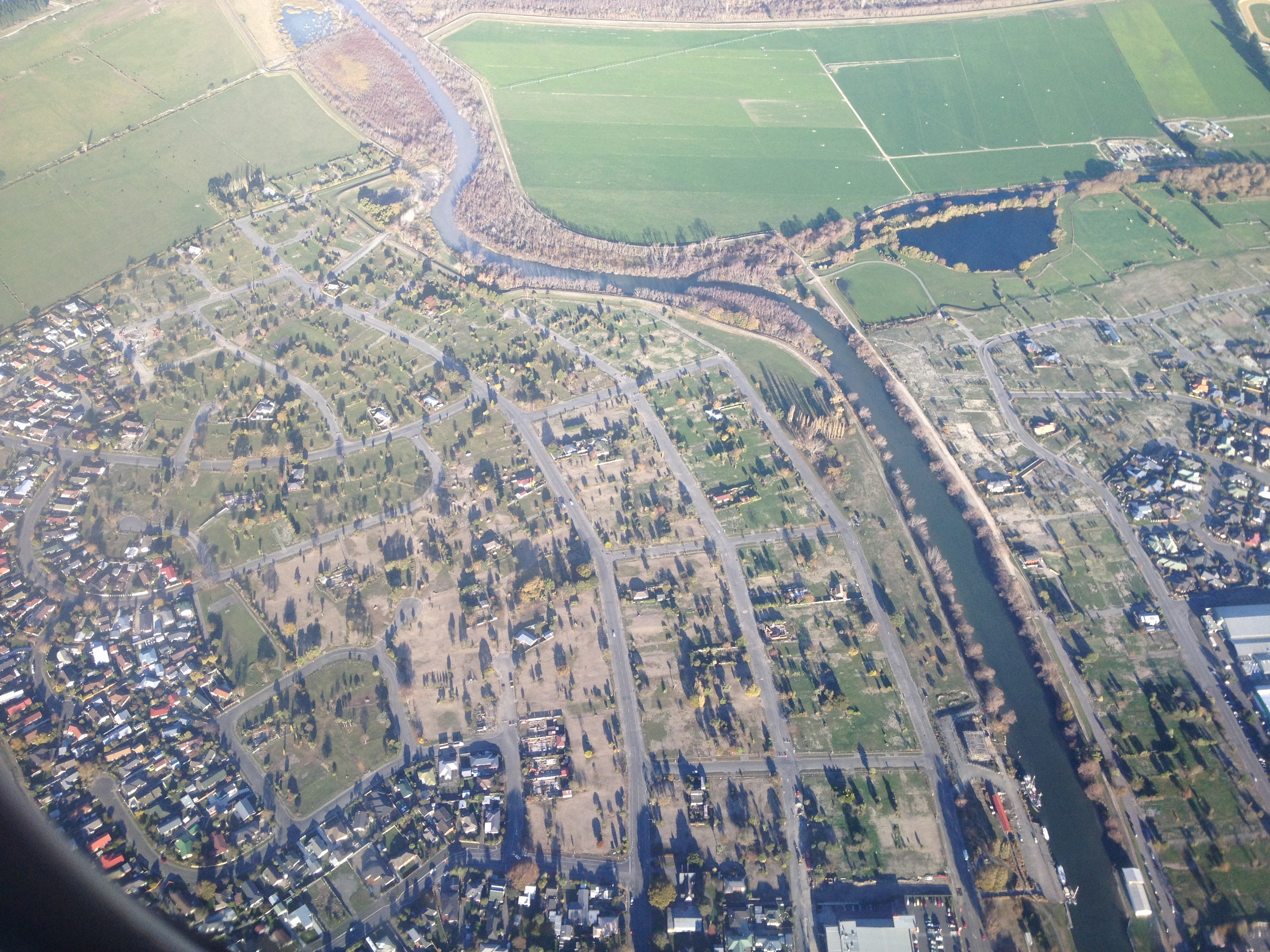
Kaiapoi River through Kaiapoi, with the Courtenay Stream on the top right

The Kaiapoi River is a minor river of north Canterbury, in New Zealand's South Island. Originally called the Cam River, it is a tributary of the Waimakariri River, which it joins at the larger river's estuary. The river is 16 kilometres (10 mi) long, and its drainage area is about 430 square kilometres (170 mi^{2}).

The towns of Rangiora, Kaiapoi and Woodend are situated on the banks of the river.

The Kaiapoi River has several tributaries, including the Cam River, used for carting logs and wool in the 1890s and 1900s. There are also several streams that join the Kaiapoi River. Some hold a large population of salmon and trout—the Cam River was a fishing spot in the 1940s and still holds a large population of trout today.

In 2018, dieback of aquatic plants, shellfish and salmon in the river was attributed to high salinity of the water by Environment Canterbury. This was thought to be due to a change in the profile of the riverbed after the 2011 Christchurch earthquake allowing seawater to progress further upstream. In 2024, some local residents further attributed the dieback to herbicides.
