= The Pines Beach =

Human settlement in Waimakariri District, Canterbury Region, New Zealand

- Rural settlement
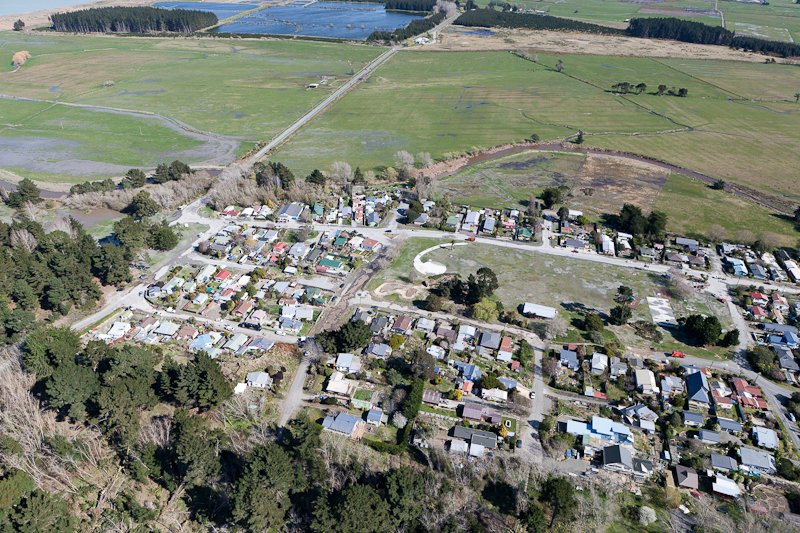
- Pines Beach after the 2010 Canterbury earthquake
- Interactive map of The Pines Beach
- Coordinates: 43°22′48″S 172°42′06″E
- Country: New Zealand
- Region: Canterbury
- Territorial authority: Waimakariri District
- Ward: Kaiapoi-Woodend Ward
- Community: Kaiapoi-Tuahiwi Community
- Electorates: Waimakariri; Te Tai Tonga (Māori)

Government
  - Territorial Authority: Waimakariri District Council
  - Regional council: Environment Canterbury
  - Mayor of Waimakariri: Dan Gordon
  - Waimakariri MP: Matt Doocey
  - Te Tai Tonga MP: Tākuta Ferris

Area
  - Total: 0.60 km^{2} (0.23 sq mi)

Population (June 2025)
  - Total: 330
  - Density: 550/km^{2} (1,400/sq mi)
- Time zone: UTC+12 (NZST)
  - Summer (DST): UTC+13 (NZDT)
- Postcode: 7692
- Area code: 03
- Local iwi: Ngāi Tahu

The Pines Beach is a small town situated roughly 4 kilometres (2.5 miles) east of Kaiapoi in the Canterbury region of the South Island of New Zealand. It is 1 km (0.62 mi) north of the mouth of the Waimakariri River. It takes its name from its close proximity to both a pine forest and the beach.

The Pines Beach is a relatively small town. The majority of the area consists of residential housing and a park called "The Pines Beach Oval". The village store was demolished after the September 2010 Canterbury earthquake, along with a considerable number of the houses in the village, which were placed into a residential red zone by the Canterbury Earthquake Recovery Authority. Empty green spaces upon entering the village from Beach Road is all that remains of these earlier parts of the settlement.

The Oval is a small section of land in the centre of the town. It is in the shape of an oval and has a playground, basketball court, swings, a skate park and a BMX track. An annual gala is held on the Oval.

== Demographics ==
The Pines Beach is described by Stats NZ as a rural settlement, which covers 0.60 km^{2} (0.23 sq mi). It had an estimated population of 330 as of June 2025, with a population density of 550 people per km^{2}. The Pines Beach is part of the larger Pegasus Bay statistical area.

Historical population for The Pines Beach
Year	Pop.	±% p.a.
2006	486	—
2013	351	−4.54%
2018	324	−1.59%
2023	324	+0.00%

The Pines Beach had a population of 324 in the 2023 New Zealand census, unchanged since the 2018 census, and a decrease of 27 people (−7.7%) since the 2013 census. There were 156 males, 162 females, and 3 people of other genders in 138 dwellings. 4.6% of people identified as LGBTIQ+. The median age was 44.0 years (compared with 38.1 years nationally). There were 48 people (14.8%) aged under 15 years, 48 (14.8%) aged 15 to 29, 183 (56.5%) aged 30 to 64, and 45 (13.9%) aged 65 or older.

People could identify as more than one ethnicity. The results were 88.9% European (Pākehā), 14.8% Māori, 2.8% Pasifika, 0.9% Asian, and 1.9% other, which includes people giving their ethnicity as "New Zealander". English was spoken by 99.1%, Māori by 2.8%, and other languages by 3.7%. The percentage of people born overseas was 13.9, compared with 28.8% nationally.

Religious affiliations were 23.1% Christian, 0.9% Māori religious beliefs, 0.9% New Age, and 0.9% other religions. People who answered that they had no religion were 63.0%, and 12.0% of people did not answer the census question.

Of those at least 15 years old, 42 (15.2%) people had a bachelor's or higher degree, 168 (60.9%) had a post-high school certificate or diploma, and 63 (22.8%) people exclusively held high school qualifications. The median income was $41,100, compared with $41,500 nationally. 12 people (4.3%) earned over $100,000 compared to 12.1% nationally. The employment status of those at least 15 was 138 (50.0%) full-time, 30 (10.9%) part-time, and 9 (3.3%) unemployed.

=== Pegasus Bay statistical area ===
Pegasus Bay statistical area, which also includes Woodend Beach and Kairaki, covers 23.53 km^{2} (9.08 sq mi). It had an estimated population of 1,030 as of June 2025, with a population density of 44 people per km^{2}.

Historical population for Pegasus Bay
Year	Pop.	±% p.a.
2006	1,158	—
2013	1,035	−1.59%
2018	1,008	−0.53%
2023	990	−0.36%
The 2006 population is for a larger area of 24.57 km^{2}. Source:

Pegasus Bay had a population of 990 in the 2023 New Zealand census, a decrease of 18 people (−1.8%) since the 2018 census, and a decrease of 45 people (−4.3%) since the 2013 census. There were 525 males, 462 females, and 6 people of other genders in 468 dwellings. 3.3% of people identified as LGBTIQ+. The median age was 47.6 years (compared with 38.1 years nationally). There were 147 people (14.8%) aged under 15 years, 135 (13.6%) aged 15 to 29, 516 (52.1%) aged 30 to 64, and 189 (19.1%) aged 65 or older.

People could identify as more than one ethnicity. The results were 89.1% European (Pākehā); 14.5% Māori; 1.2% Pasifika; 1.2% Asian; 0.6% Middle Eastern, Latin American and African New Zealanders (MELAA); and 3.6% other, which includes people giving their ethnicity as "New Zealander". English was spoken by 98.5%, Māori by 3.6%, and other languages by 4.5%. No language could be spoken by 1.5% (e.g. too young to talk). New Zealand Sign Language was known by 0.3%. The percentage of people born overseas was 13.0, compared with 28.8% nationally.

Religious affiliations were 25.5% Christian, 0.6% Islam, 1.5% Māori religious beliefs, 0.9% New Age, 0.3% Jewish, and 0.9% other religions. People who answered that they had no religion were 60.6%, and 10.0% of people did not answer the census question.

Of those at least 15 years old, 108 (12.8%) people had a bachelor's or higher degree, 483 (57.3%) had a post-high school certificate or diploma, and 252 (29.9%) people exclusively held high school qualifications. The median income was $36,900, compared with $41,500 nationally. 48 people (5.7%) earned over $100,000 compared to 12.1% nationally. The employment status of those at least 15 was 396 (47.0%) full-time, 120 (14.2%) part-time, and 21 (2.5%) unemployed.
