= 1894 New South Wales rugby union tour of New Zealand =

Summary
P	W	D	L
Total
12	4	0	8
Test match
0	0	0	0

The 1894 New South Wales tour of New Zealand was a rugby union tour of New Zealand undertaken by the New South Wales (NSW) representative side. During the tour NSW played matches against provincial New Zealand sides, and one against a representative New Zealand team.

New South Wales won four of the matches, including the inter-colonial match against New Zealand, and lost the other eight.

== Summary ==
The New South Wales team, known as "Cornstalks", played their twelve tour matches in only one month. They lost all their matches against North Island sides, but in the South Island lost only one match—against Canterbury. Their wins in the South Island included the only match against New Zealand, which was an 8–6 victory in Christchurch. Reflecting on the tour after returning to Australia, members of the team claimed that the wet weather they experienced in the North Island accounted for their poor results there, with the New Zealander's displaying much better ball handling skills in such weather.

== Matches ==
Scores and results list New South Wales' points tally first:

Opposing team	For	Against	Date	Venue	Status
Auckland	11	14	25 August 1894	Auckland	Tour match
North Island	3	15	29 August 1894	Auckland	Tour match
Taranaki	6	21	1 September 1894	New Plymouth	Tour match
Wanganui - Manawatu	0	13	3 September 1894	Recreation Ground, Palmerston North	Tour match
Hawke's Bay	12	17	5 September 1894	Napier	Tour match
Wellington	5	9	8 September 1894	Newtown Park, Wellington	Tour match
South Canterbury	23	0	10 September 1894	Timaru	Tour match
Canterbury	3	11	13 September 1894	Lancaster Park, Christchurch	Tour match
New Zealand XV	8	6	15 September 1894	Lancaster Park, Christchurch	Tour match
West Coast	20	6	19 September 1894	Greymouth	Tour match
Nelson	13	4	22 September 1894	Nelson	Tour match
Wairarapa	3	21	25 September 1894	Wairarapa	Tour match

== Touring party ==
The New South Wales Rugby Union selected 25 players to represent the colony on tour. However, according to Sydney's Evening News, although "the names of some really first-class players are included in the team it cannot be called a thoroughly representative one" due to the absence of a number of players. The team were:

- Alcock (Wallaroo)
- Barry (Orange)
- Brand (Armidale)
- Bliss (Armidale)
- Clayton (Orange)
- Cupples (Pirates)
- Carson (Orange)
- Cobb (Newcastle)
- Dibbs (Wallaroo)
- Edwards (Newcastle)
- Galloway (Randwick)
- Henlen (Randwick)
- Hanna (Paddington)
- Lane (Wallaroo)
- Lohan (Orange)
- Lusk (Pirates)
- McMahon (Randwick)
- Parish (Randwick)
- Ranken (Bathurst)
- Riley (Randwick)
- Surman (Randwick)
- Sawyer (University)
- Scott (Wallaroo)
- Walsh (Pirates)
- Wyburd (Bathurst)
