= Kaiapoi =

Town in Canterbury, New Zealand

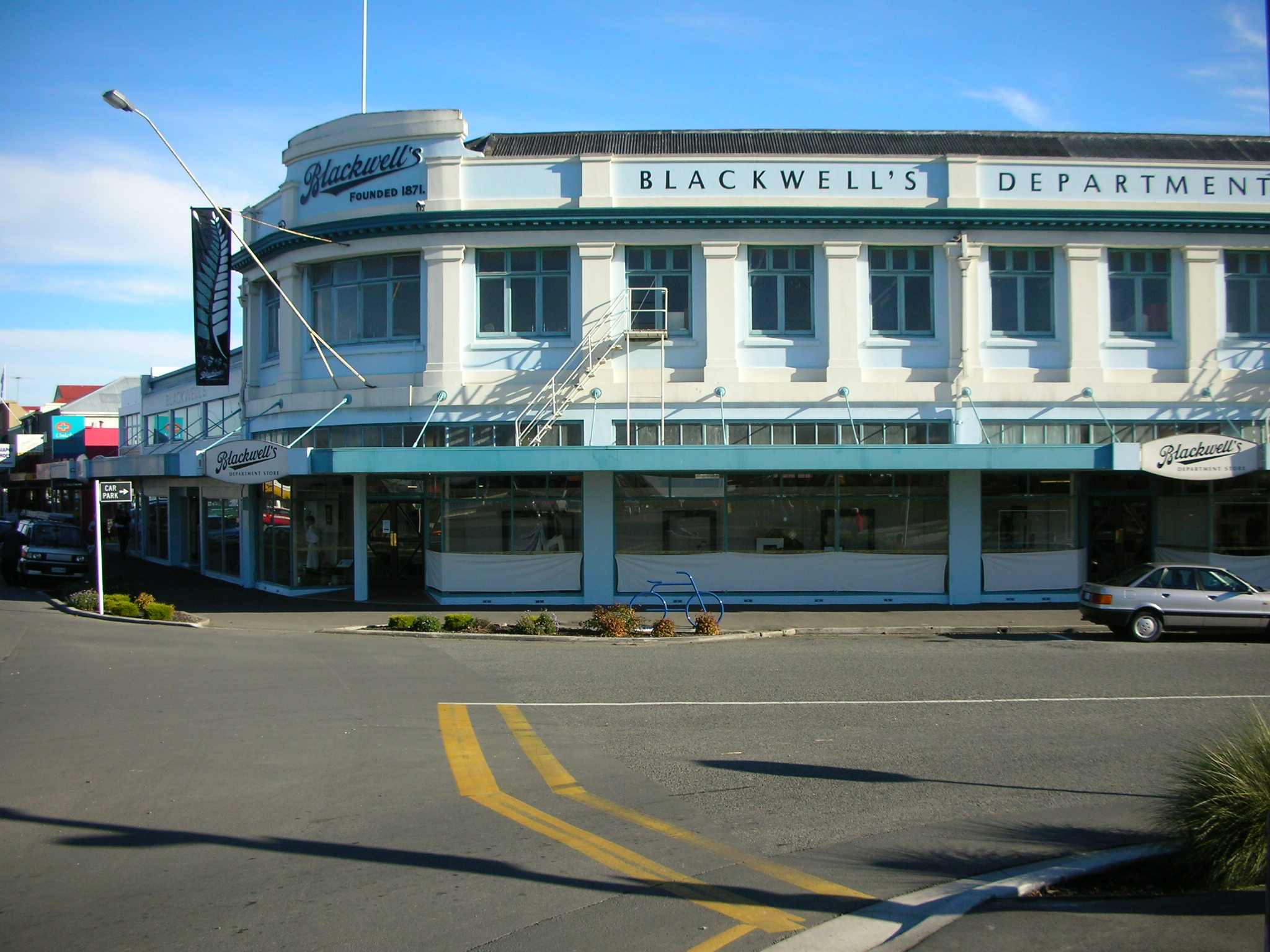
- Blackwells in Kaiapoi, demolished after the earthquakes
- Interactive map of Kaiapoi
- Coordinates: 43°22′54″S 172°39′26″E
- Country: New Zealand
- Region: Canterbury
- Territorial authority: Waimakariri District
- Ward: Kaiapoi-Woodend Ward
- Community: Kaiapoi-Tuahiwi Community
- Electorates: Waimakariri; Te Tai Tonga (Māori)

Government
  - Territorial Authority: Waimakariri District Council
  - Regional council: Environment Canterbury
  - Mayor of Waimakariri: Dan Gordon
  - Waimakariri MP: Matt Doocey
  - Te Tai Tonga MP: Mananui Ramsden

Area
  - Total: 14.65 km^{2} (5.66 sq mi)
- Elevation: 3 m (9.8 ft)

Population (June 2025)
  - Total: 13,700
  - Density: 935/km^{2} (2,420/sq mi)
- Local iwi: Ngāi Tahu

Kaiapoi is a town in the Waimakariri District of the Canterbury region, in the South Island of New Zealand. The town is located approximately 17 kilometres north of central Christchurch, close to the mouth of the Waimakariri River. It is considered a satellite town of Christchurch and is part of the Christchurch functional urban area. The town is named after the nearby Kaiapoi Pā.

Kaiapoi suffered extensive damage in the 2010 Canterbury and also the February 2011 Christchurch earthquakes, which rendered many homes uninhabitable and businesses inoperable. Large areas were condemned as part of a residential red zone covering uninhabitable areas.

== History ==
=== Pre-settlement ===
Kaiapoi is located on what was formally the south bank of the north branch of the Waimakariri River. This patch of land between the north and south branches of the Waimakariri was the largest island in the lower reaches of the river. "Kaiapoi Island" (as it was later called) was of spiritual and educational significance to Ngāi Tahu, who called it Te Rakai a Hewa (the adornment of the deluded one). A stream that ran through the island, Te Tupapaku (also known as Courtenay Stream), was an important location for the ritual burial process of local Māori.

=== Early settlement ===
When the Christchurch settlement was planned, a secondary market town named 'Mandeville' was proposed by Captain Joseph Thomas to support north-Canterbury farmers. Charles Torlesse surveyed the area in 1849 and on early maps it is marked to the south-west of modern-day Kaiapoi. The Canterbury Association ran out of money in 1850, and surveying work came to a stop before the town could be established. While the name of 'Mandeville' stuck for the surveyed region, the area of the future township remained 'Kaiapoi' due to the continued presence of Ngāi Tahu families in the area.

In 1851, Sir Thomas Tancred proposed a new settlement in Canterbury. He was concerned that the Canterbury Association had not made enough progress in establishing the promised Anglican model values in their new settlements. The name for this proposed settlement was to be 'Gladstone'. Tancred wrote to Henry Sewell, asking him to instruct John Robert Godley to set aside land for the Gladstone settlers. By this stage in 1852 the Canterbury Association was not performing well financially, and was soon to wind-up and hand control to the newly-formed provincial government. Sewell forwarded the message, but Godley took no action to advance the plan. Thus, when the Gladstone settlers began arriving in 1853 they discovered no land had been set aside for them. The mouth of the Waimakariri River was suggested as a possible place for their new town, as much of that land had been set aside for the use of the church. An inspection party of settlers were joined by Sewell and surveyor Thomas Cass to explore the area. The group agreed on a location at the confluence of the north and south branches, close to where the proposed North Road met the river.

However, tensions flared the following day at a meeting between the settlers, Sewell, and Charles Simeon. An offer of 50 acres (20 ha) of church land was made and agreed to, but the settlers had additional demands that could not be immediately met. After an argument, Sewell and Simeon decided to end the Gladstone scheme, as it was proving to be too much trouble. However, the suitability of the site was so great that Sewell began the work of establishing the town anyway, but rather under the direction of the Canterbury Association and not the Gladstone settlers. Soon 200 acres (81 ha) of church land was marked off, and in 1853 Henry Cridland had laid out a map of the new settlement. By early 1854 the road to Kaiapoi was well-trodden, and the small settlement had begun to form.

Despite the collapse of the Gladstone scheme, many of the Gladstone settlers became established at Kaiapoi. Notable figures included the Reverend John Raven, who commissioned the first church in the area. The wooden building of St Bartholomew's church was opened in 1856, to plans by Benjamin Mountfort. Today it is the oldest surviving church in Canterbury.

In 1857 Kaiapoi was declared a town by the provincial council.

=== Rural hub ===
Kaiapoi was an important hub for the early north Canterbury settlers, largely due to the river port that was established there. The mouth bar of the Waimakariri River posed a significant hazard to ships, and many ran aground. The river was also notorious for changing course and flooding unexpectedly. Despite this, the north branch of the river was navigable to Kaiapoi by small coastal shipping vessels. This port transported wool and wheat from the local farms to the major port at Lyttelton.

During the great storm of 1868 the Waimakariri flooded, destroying buildings, bridges, telegraph lines and port facilities. Later that same year, a tsunami triggered by an earthquake in Peru did further damage to the wharves.

The rail line from Christchurch to Kaiapoi opened in April 1872, beginning a decline in the use of Kaiapoi as a port. Coastal shipping did continue to be a major part of industrial transport in the area, however. Local businessman John Sims purchased coastal shipping vessels and expanded the wharf facilities at Kaiapoi during the 1870s and 80s. It was not until 1904 that the Kaiapoi Railway Station was opened.

The Kaiapoi Woollen Milling Company was established in the late 1870s. This business produced high-quality woollen blankets and clothing, and was successful during the 1880s in spite of the wider economic recession. It continued to be a major pillar of the local economy until its closure in the 1970s.

During World War I, a major slaughterhouse and freezing works was established in Kaiapoi. The facility processed sheep from across North Canterbury and remained an economic centre of the town until its closure in 1991. During the 1918 influenza pandemic seventeen people died of the disease, meaning that Kaiapoi had the second-highest death rate in North Canterbury, after Amberley.

The town was struck by two earthquakes in 1921 and 1922, and in 1923 the town experienced a major flood. This flood lead to a flurry of activity over the following decade to stabilise the course of the Waimakariri. Changes upstream of the town had the effect of reducing the flow of the North Branch of the river, and making it less prone to flooding. As it became effectively disconnected from the Waimakariri upstream of Kaiapoi, it was renamed to Kaiapoi River in 1959.

The 1920s saw a brief renewal of interest in the use of Kaiapoi as a port. This came in the context that both Kaiapoi and Lyttelton were at risk of losing port trade to Timaru. At one stage the Kaiapoi freezing works was sending frozen meat to Timaru for export. Despite local popular support for the port at Kaiapoi, several factors were working against it: the Waimakariri river bar still posed a significant hazard to ships; the course of the north branch of the river shifted so frequently that it was seen as unreliable for shipping vessels; the introduction of rail across the Southern Alps via the tunnel at Otira in 1923 made coastal shipping less necessary; and the river could not accommodate the trend towards larger more economical vessels for coastal shipping. All of these factors contributed to the decline of Kaiapoi as a trade port. Coastal shipping continued at Kaiapoi, with a brief increase after World War II. The port continued to bring in coal and dangerous goods even into the 1960s. In 1969 port activity was finally suspended.

The town's war memorial records 20 local men as having died during World War II. The memorial, designed by William Trethewey, was first unveiled on Anzac Day in 1922 to commemorate the first world war. It was later updated after the second world war.

=== 2010 earthquakes ===
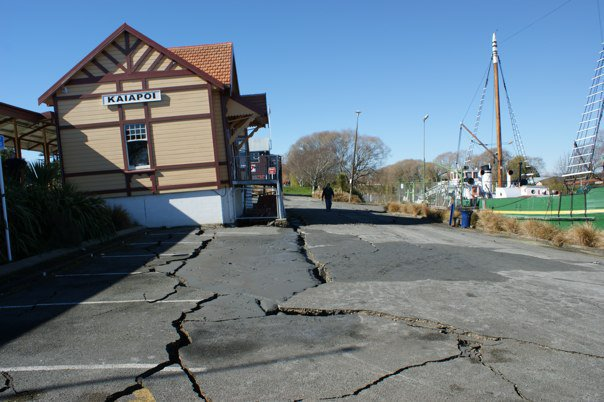
Kaiapoi railway station after the September 2010 Canterbury earthquake

The town suffered significant damage during the 2010 Canterbury earthquake. Ultimately, more than 900 homes in Kaiapoi and nearby The Pines Beach were ultimately abandoned due to the earthquake damage to the land. The earthquake caused enormous damage to infrastructure, interrupting the water supply and sewerage.

Many local buildings were damaged and demolished. The façade of the Blackwell's Department Store was significantly damaged. It was demolished the same afternoon as the first earthquake to mitigate the safety risk during the ongoing aftershocks. The Kaiapoi Railway Station building was largely undamaged, though its foundation tilted dramatically. Rather than be demolished, the heritage building was moved to a safer location and later restored.

== Demographics ==
Kaiapoi is described by Stats NZ as a medium urban area and covers 14.65 km^{2} (5.66 sq mi). It had an estimated population of 13,700 as of June 2025, with a population density of 935 people per km^{2}. The population experienced a large dip after the 2011 Christchurch earthquakes, but has been growing rapidly, and is expected to continue to grow.

Historical population
Year	Pop.	±% p.a.
2006	10,602	—
2013	9,477	−1.59%
2018	11,853	+4.58%
2023	13,017	+1.89%
The 2006 population is for a smaller area of 14.33 km^{2}. Source:

Kaiapoi had a population of 13,017 in the 2023 New Zealand census, an increase of 1,164 people (9.8%) since the 2018 census, and an increase of 3,540 people (37.4%) since the 2013 census. There were 6,354 males, 6,624 females, and 39 people of other genders in 5,259 dwellings. 2.8% of people identified as LGBTIQ+. The median age was 44.0 years (compared with 38.1 years nationally). There were 2,154 people (16.5%) aged under 15 years, 2,166 (16.6%) aged 15 to 29, 5,763 (44.3%) aged 30 to 64, and 2,937 (22.6%) aged 65 or older.

People could identify as more than one ethnicity. The results were 88.4% European (Pākehā); 13.5% Māori; 2.6% Pasifika; 5.5% Asian; 0.6% Middle Eastern, Latin American and African New Zealanders (MELAA); and 2.3% other, which includes people giving their ethnicity as "New Zealander". English was spoken by 97.2%, Māori by 2.4%, Samoan by 0.5%, and other languages by 6.6%. No language could be spoken by 2.1% (e.g. too young to talk). New Zealand Sign Language was known by 0.6%. The percentage of people born overseas was 16.7, compared with 28.8% nationally.

Religious affiliations were 28.6% Christian, 0.9% Hindu, 0.5% Islam, 0.4% Māori religious beliefs, 0.4% Buddhist, 0.4% New Age, and 1.5% other religions. People who answered that they had no religion were 58.7%, and 8.8% of people did not answer the census question.

Of those at least 15 years old, 1,470 (13.5%) people had a bachelor's or higher degree, 6,348 (58.4%) had a post-high school certificate or diploma, and 3,048 (28.1%) people exclusively held high school qualifications. The median income was $39,400, compared with $41,500 nationally. 789 people (7.3%) earned over $100,000 compared to 12.1% nationally. The employment status of those at least 15 was 5,415 (49.8%) full-time, 1,437 (13.2%) part-time, and 231 (2.1%) unemployed.

Individual statistical areas
Name	Area (km^{2})	Population	Density (per km^{2})	Dwellings	Median age	Median income
Kaiapoi Central	1.52	2,115	1,391	936	43.7 years	$37,600
Kaiapoi East	5.02	291	58	189	64.9 years	$24,500
Kaiapoi North West	3.51	2,040	581	846	43.8 years	$35,100
Kaiapoi South	0.88	1,899	2,158	714	46.3 years	$36,900
Kaiapoi West	0.51	1,257	2,465	465	37.6 years	$37,200
Silverstream (Waimakariri District)	1.01	1,584	1,568	702	42.6 years	$45,700
Sovereign Palms	2.20	3,831	1,741	1,407	43.6 years	$45,900
New Zealand					38.1 years	$41,500

== Commerce ==
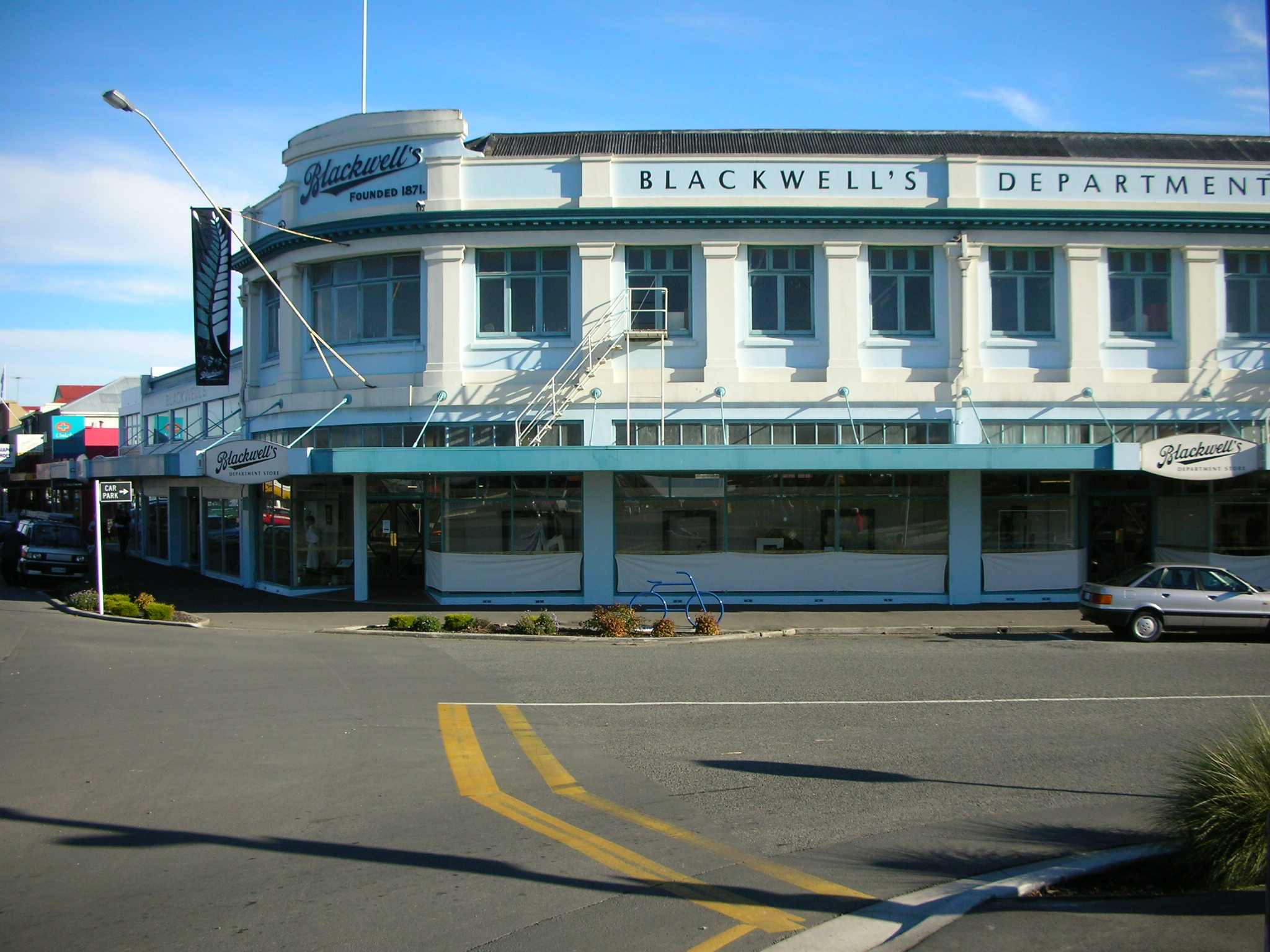
Blackwell's department store, shown in 2006, is an institution and landmark in Kaiapoi

Kaiapoi is also known as the 'River Town' after the Kaiapoi River, a tributary of the Waimakariri River that flows through the centre of the town. This was originally the main arm of the Waimakariri River, but extensive flooding led to a diversion so the majority of the water travelled down the South arm of the Waimakariri.

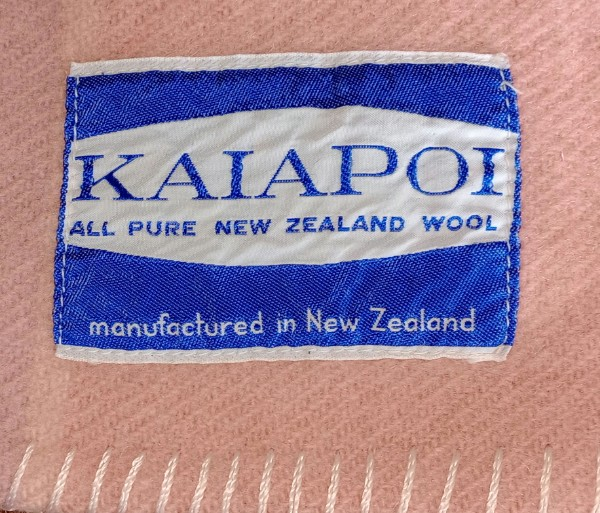
Corner of a blanket made by the Kaiapoi Woollen Manufacturing Company

Kaiapoi was well known for the woollen mill run by the Kaiapoi Woollen Manufacturing Company, and many woollen items produced at the mill can still be found throughout the world.

A freezing works (meat processing plant) was also a major employer in the town, and once this and the woollen mill had closed there was some economic turmoil in the town, and concern over its future. It, however, has survived and prospered, and although there is some local industry, a large percentage of the population works in the neighbouring city of Christchurch. One optimistic politician of the 1800s had even predicted that Kaiapoi would outsize its neighbour Christchurch. Kaiapoi is considered to be a satellite town of greater Christchurch, alongside Rolleston.

== Education ==
Kaiapoi has five schools: three primary schools, one high school, and a teen parent unit attached to the high school.

- Kaiapoi Borough School is a state co-educational full primary school, with 372 students (as of July 2026). The school opened in 1873, making it Kaiapoi's oldest school.
- Kaiapoi North School is a state co-educational full primary school, with 505 students (as of July 2026). The school opened in 1962.
- St Patrick's School is a state-integrated co-educational full primary Catholic school, with 196 students (as of July 2026). It opened in 1926.
- Kaiapoi High School is a state co-educational secondary school, with 1,059 students (as of July 2026). The school opened in 1972.
- Karanga Mai Young Parents College is the teen parent unit attached to Kaiapoi High School. It opened in 1992.

== Recreation ==
Outdoor recreation options include the Kaiapoi River which is deep enough for boating, with multiple accessible boat-ramps. There is a paddle-boat that offers pleasure cruises for tourists. The nearby Waimakariri River Regional Park is popular for kayaking, fishing, cycling and off-roading. Kaiapoi is also close to The Pines Beach.

Trousselot Park in Charles St on the banks of the Kaiapoi River has a skate park and play areas. The band rotunda is a Category 2 historic place. It was built in 1908 in Darnley Square but moved in 1913 to Raven Quay. After suffering from vandalism and lack of use it was moved to the park in 2003.

The Waimakariri District Council operates several public recreation facilities in Kaiapoi including a library, museum, and a swimming pool. The Darnley Club provides community recreational opportunities for the elderly and the Chris Ruth Centre provides community recreational opportunities for adults with severe disabilities.

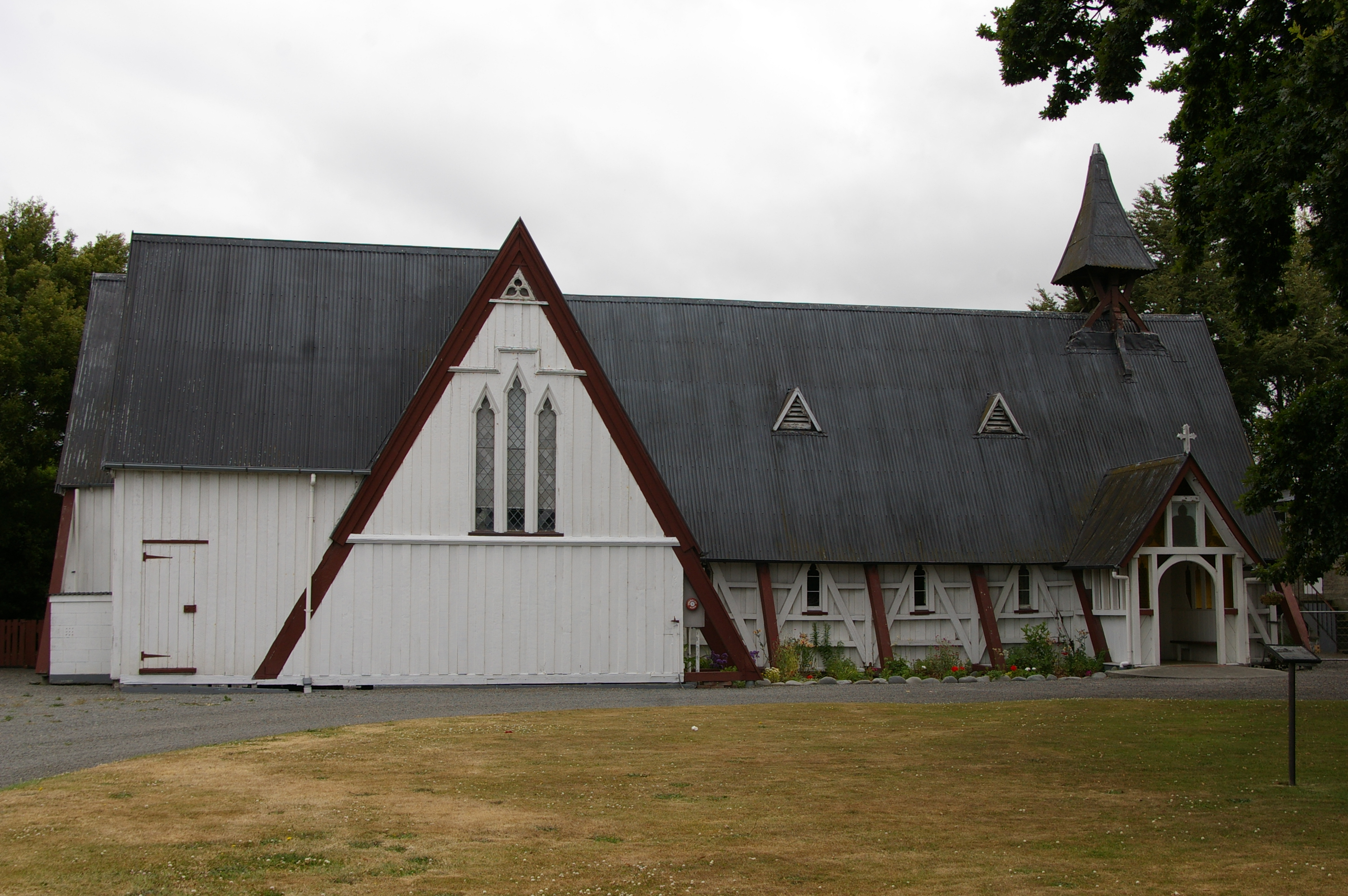
St Bartholomew's Church, Kaiapoi

Kaiapoi is represented by both rugby codes. The Kaiapoi Rugby Football Club was established in 1883 and has its home ground at Kaiapoi Park. It competes in the Canterbury Rugby Football Union. The Kaiapoi Rugby League Club (now playing as the Northern Bulldogs) began in 1957 and play in the local Canterbury Rugby League. The club has been based at Murphy Park since 1960. In 2007 — the club's jubilee 50th season — the Bulldogs won the Thacker Shield.

Kaiapoi is the location of St Bartholomew's Church, which is the oldest wooden church in the Anglican Diocese of Christchurch, built in 1855.

The dirt-surface Woodford Glen Speedway is only a short-distance south, between Kaiapoi and Kainga.

== Transport ==
State Highway 1 bypasses the town to the west via the Christchurch Northern Motorway. Prior to the completion of the motorway in December 1970, State Highway 1 ran down the main street of Kaiapoi. A bus runs nine times a day to or from central Christchurch.

The Main North Line railway runs through Kaiapoi, and the town once served as the junction for the Eyreton Branch, which provided rail access to communities west of Kaiapoi such as West Eyreton (though it ran to the north of Eyreton itself). This branch line opened in 1875 and closed fully by April 1965. The old station has a NZHPT Category II listing.

The river used to have a port before the construction of the Waimakariri River bridge, and was an important point for the transport of goods to and from Christchurch. Bucking the trend of river ports dying off in the middle of the 20th century, the port actually reopened for a decade between 1958 and 1967, to allow smaller ships to bypass the congested Lyttelton wharves.

== Notable people ==
- Matiaha Tiramōrehu (?–1881), Ngāi Tahu tribal leader
- Jane Thomson (1858–1944), mountaineer born in Kaiapoi
- Stella Henderson (1871–1962), feminist, university graduate and journalist
- Henry William F Trousselot (1860–1926). Born Channel Islands but later settled in Kaiapoi. Awarded the French Legion of Honour, Royal Freedom of London, and hero of the Ben Venue shipwreck (Timaru). Trousselot Park (Kaiapoi) is named after him. Councillor and prominent personage.
- Henry Boddington (1863–1938), cricketer who played for Nelson and Otago
- Isabel Button (1863–1921), horse driver, trainer and equestrian
- Henare Uru (1872–1929), Reform Party politician
- Thomas Bavin (1874–1941), Premier of New South Wales (born in Kaiapoi)
- Morgan Williams (1878–1970), Labour Party MP for and mayor of Kaiapoi
- Algy Whitehead (1885–1961), Anglican priest
- Bruce Young (1888–1952), baker, policeman, unionist and police commissioner
- Frank Smith (1893–1975), cricketer
- Richard Moore (1849–1936), MP for and mayor of Kaiapoi
- Norman Kirk (1923–1974), mayor of Kaiapoi and later prime minister of New Zealand
- Azalea Sinclair (born 1930), netballer
- Ian Shirley (1940–2019), academic
- Frank Rapley (born 1937), cricketer
- Sisters Erin Baker (born 1961) and Philippa Baker (born 1963), New Zealand athletes
- Brian Ford (born 28 August 1970), cricketer
- Bob Irvine (born 1940), rugby league player
- Matt Todd (born 1988), Rugby Player – Kaiapoi RFC, Canterbury (72 caps), Crusaders (140) and All Blacks (25)

There were at least six test match All Blacks who were born in Kaiapoi, including William Balch, New Zealand teacher; George Maber, who had played for Wellington; Duncan McGregor, who also played league, as well as John Ashworth (born 1949), who played for them, although he had been born in Waikari.
