= Malvern Hills, New Zealand =

Hills in Canterbury, New Zealand

Malvern Hills
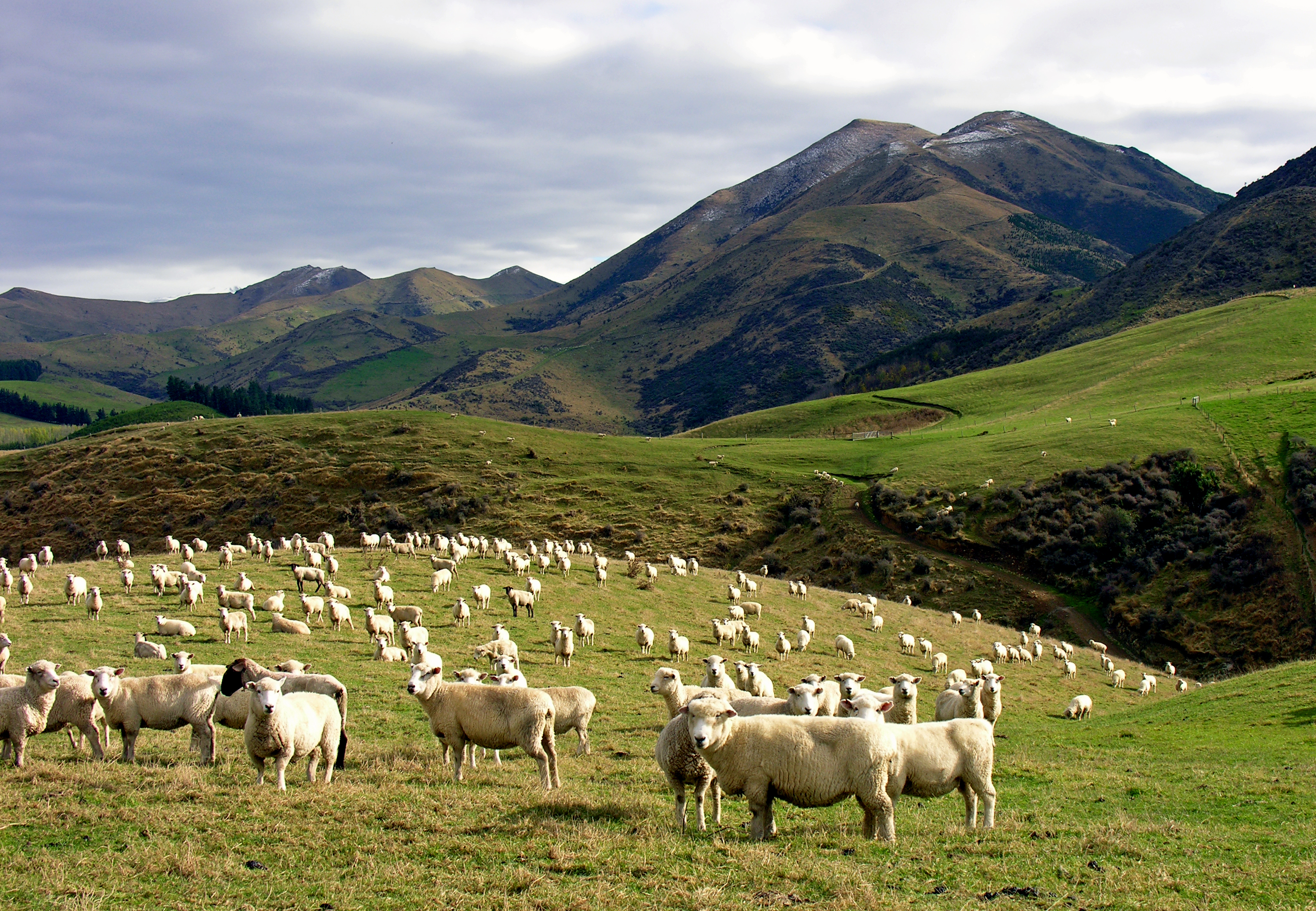
- A typical rural scene in the Malvern Hills near Whitecliffs. Flagpole Hill can be seen in the background (right)

Geography
- Country: New Zealand
- Region: Canterbury
- District: Selwyn District

Geology
- Volcanic zone: Mount Somers Volcanic Group

The Malvern Hills is a rural locality and hill range located in the western region of the Selwyn District, New Zealand. They form distinctive landscapes of rolling hills and valleys formed by rivers such as the Hawkins, Selwyn and Waianiwaniwa Rivers and glaciers during the glacial maximum in the Quaternary. It is notable for its agricultural scene and historic coal and sand mining.

== Geography and environment ==
The Malvern Hills occupy foothill country linking the Canterbury Plains to the Southern Alps, between Sheffield and Whitecliffs. The Rockwood Range sits to the west of the hills. Elevations are modest, with the average elevation being a few hundred metres above sea level. There are sparse native forests farther on from Whitecliffs, and patches of remnant native tussock around Wairiri Valley and Whitecliffs. The climate is temperate with moderate rainfall.

== Geology ==
The earliest geological survey was undertaken by Julius von Haast, who was then Provincial Geologist for Canterbury. Later in 1928, a more comprehensive geology survey was undertaken by Robert Speight, where he produced detailed geological surveys, mapping bedrock, stratigraphy, and structural features in the hills, specifically the coal, clay and sand fields. Homebush Sandstone of beach and marine origin can be seen in the Selwyn River, where flood waters have eroded away alluvial material from the river bed (pictured, left).

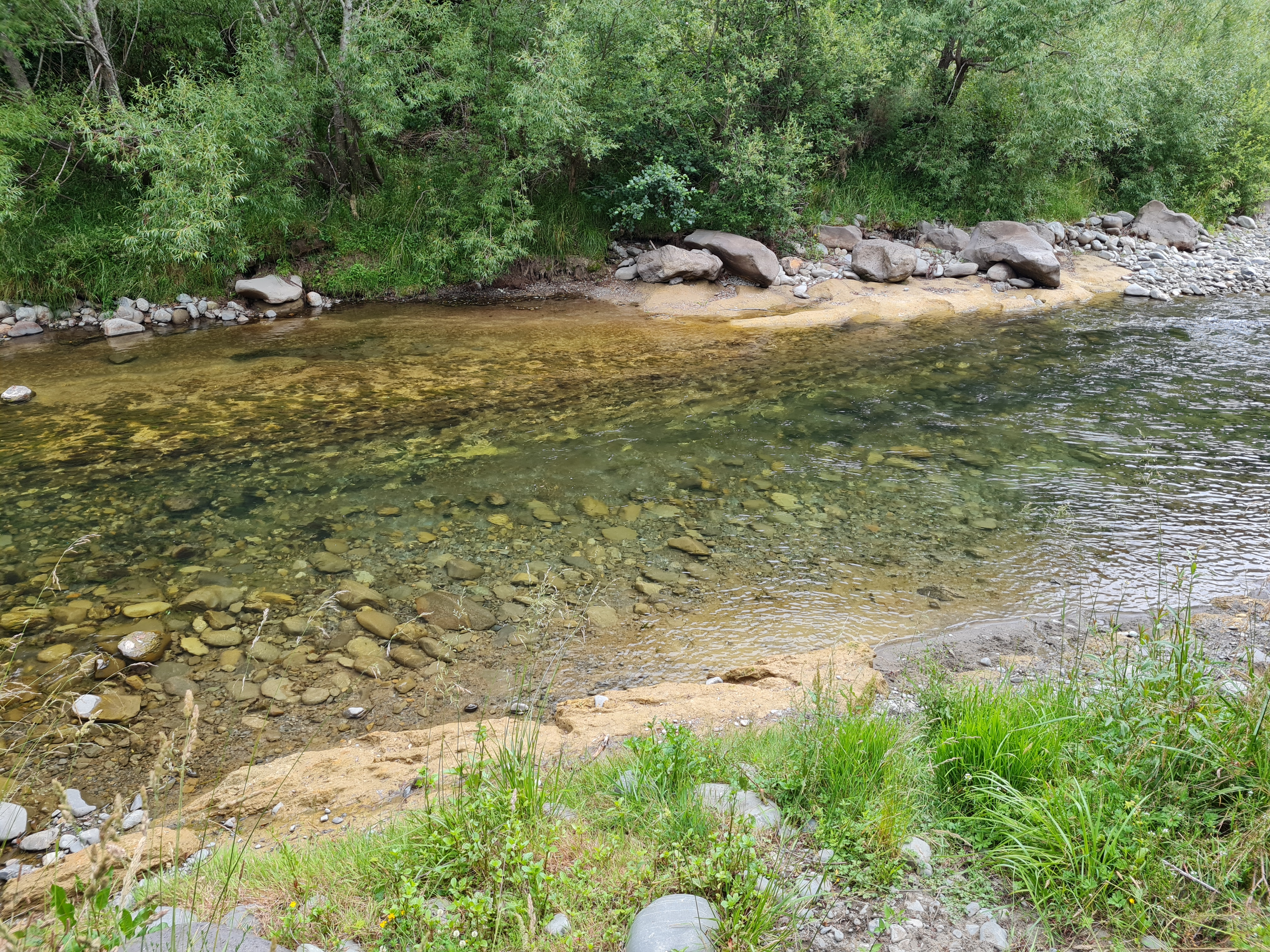
Homebush Sandstone (Eyre Group) exposed after a high-flow event in the Selwyn River, Glentunnel

In 2012, more recent work by Robert Holm and David Bell examines the Erye Group stratigraphy and sedimentology of the Malvern Hills Coal Mine. Their study finds the late-Cretaceous/early-Paleocene Broken River Formation, which consists of fining-upward cycles of flaser and lenticular-bedded quartz sandstones, carbonaceous mudstones, and coal seams, indicating a coastal swamp environment. Above the Broken River Formation is the Paleocene Conway Formation, which shows features of cross-bedded marine quartz sandstones and lenses of tidal sedimentation, indicating a lower intertidal–subtidal environment.

Other significant geological features that are found in the area are igneous basalts (Harper Hills), located immediately to the south of the Selwyn River and the Mount Somers Volcanic Group (MSVG), an upper-Cretaceous volcanic group of seven calc-alkaline volcanic formations. These are the Surrey Hills Tuff, Barrosa Andesite, Woolshed Creek Ignimbrite, Somers Rhyolite, Somers Ignimbrite, volcanic conglomerates and tuffs, and Hinds River Dacite. The formations present in the Malvern Hills are the northern-most landforms found in the MSVG.

=== Glaciation ===
Evidence of the Rakaia Glacier extending into the Malvern Hills is seen in the presence of truncated spurs, eskers, and aggradational terraces and fans in the Selwyn valley. The associated river (Selwyn) and its catchment are not large enough to produce the aggradational features here. It is inferred that glacial origins could have transported and deposited the additional volumes of sediment, with ice extending down to approximately Glentunnel.

Glacial Lake Glenroy formed in what is now the Wairiri Valley, with ice extending down to where the Glentunnel Ammunition Depot is. As the glacier retreated, the aggradational fan that formed at the toe of the glacier blocked meltwater from flowing and accumulated in the over-deepened basin valley.

=== Seismicity ===
The Malvern Hills were close to the epicentre of the 2010 Canterbury earthquake, which struck near Darfield on 4 September 2010. The quake caused widespread damage across Canterbury, particularly in Christchurch.

The Hororata Fault is a late-Cenozoic reverse fault that runs in a northeast-southwest direction for 15.5 km (9.6 mi). It tracks south of the Harper Hills, before traversing through Homebush and ending near Racecourse Hill.

== History ==
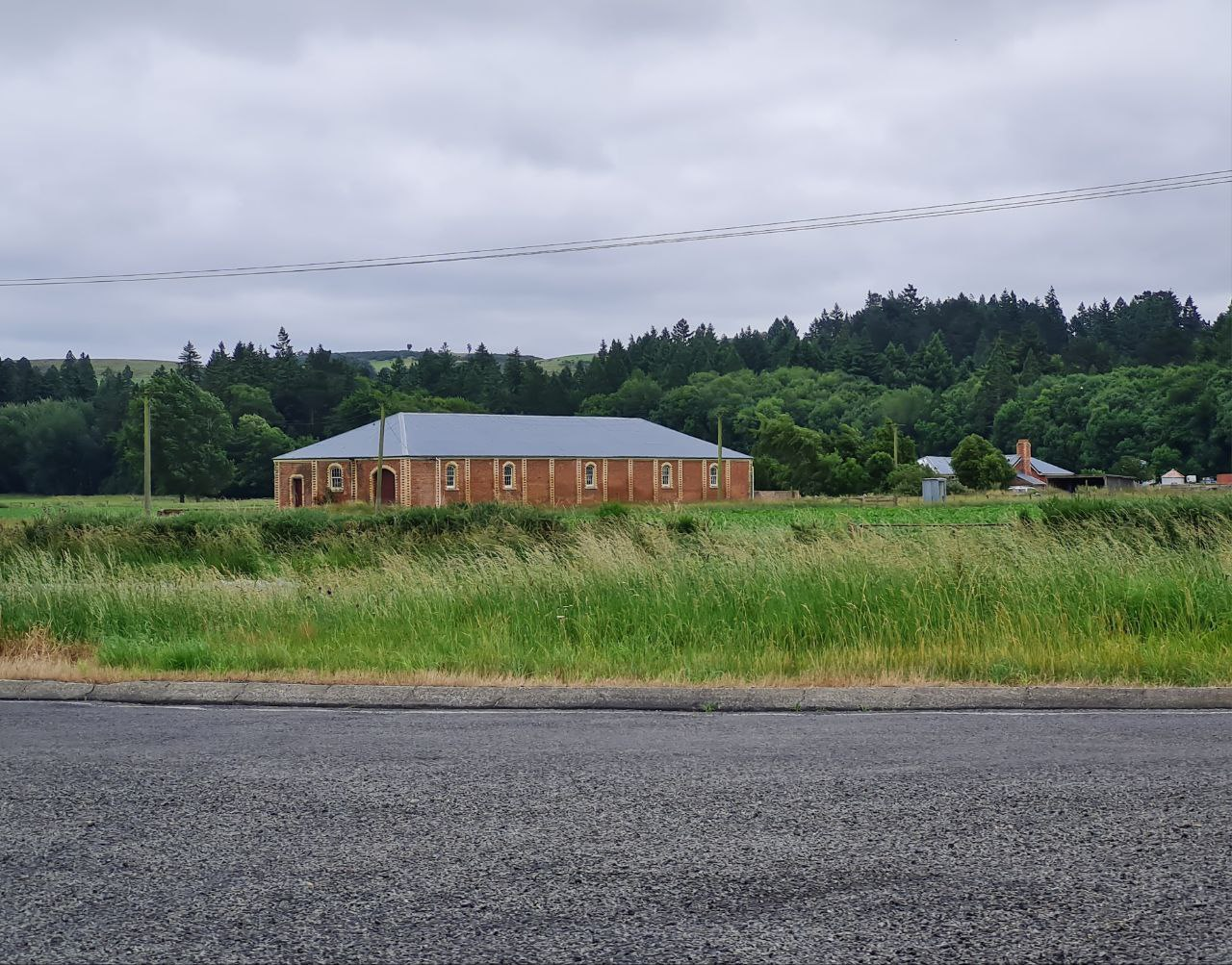
Agriculture and livestock farming lead to the construction of many farm buildings, in this instance, the Homebush Station Woolshed

The area was named by early European settlers after the Malvern Hills in Worcestershire and Herefordshire, England. Pastoral farming was established in the mid-19th century, with large sheep runs dominating the landscape. One of the most prominent families to farm was the Deans family. Agricultural development, including cropping and dairying, increased as the land was subdivided into smaller farms during the late 19th and early 20th centuries.

Owing to the rich clay deposits of the area, the Glentunnel Brickworks operated from 1875 until its closure on 31 October 1983. It manufactured bricks, tiles and pottery. Products from the brickworks were used to build the Homebush Homestead, as well as other farm buildings around the Deans' Homebush station.

== Economy ==
=== Agriculture ===
This remains the dominant land use in the Malvern Hills district today. Sheep, beef, and dairy farming are common, alongside arable cropping. Forestry and lifestyle farming have also developed in more recent decades. The area is known for its fertile soils and access to irrigation from Canterbury’s rivers.

=== Mining ===
Industrial activity such as lignite coal mining used to take place in the region. This was one reason as to why the Whitecliffs Branch and other private tramways were built (to Bush Gully and the mines north of Glentunnel), but industrial activity declined sharply in the 20th century and has been effectively non-existent since the 1980s. However, one open-pit coal mine is still operated by Bathurst Resources Limited.

Holm & Bell (2013) note that historic mines in the region, including Homebush (worked 1873–1938) and Klondyke (worked 1929–1972), together produced around 356,000 tonnes of coal from these early mines.

== See also ==
- Geology of the Canterbury Region
- Selwyn District
- Canterbury Region
