= Hawkins, New Zealand =

Hawkins
- Settlement
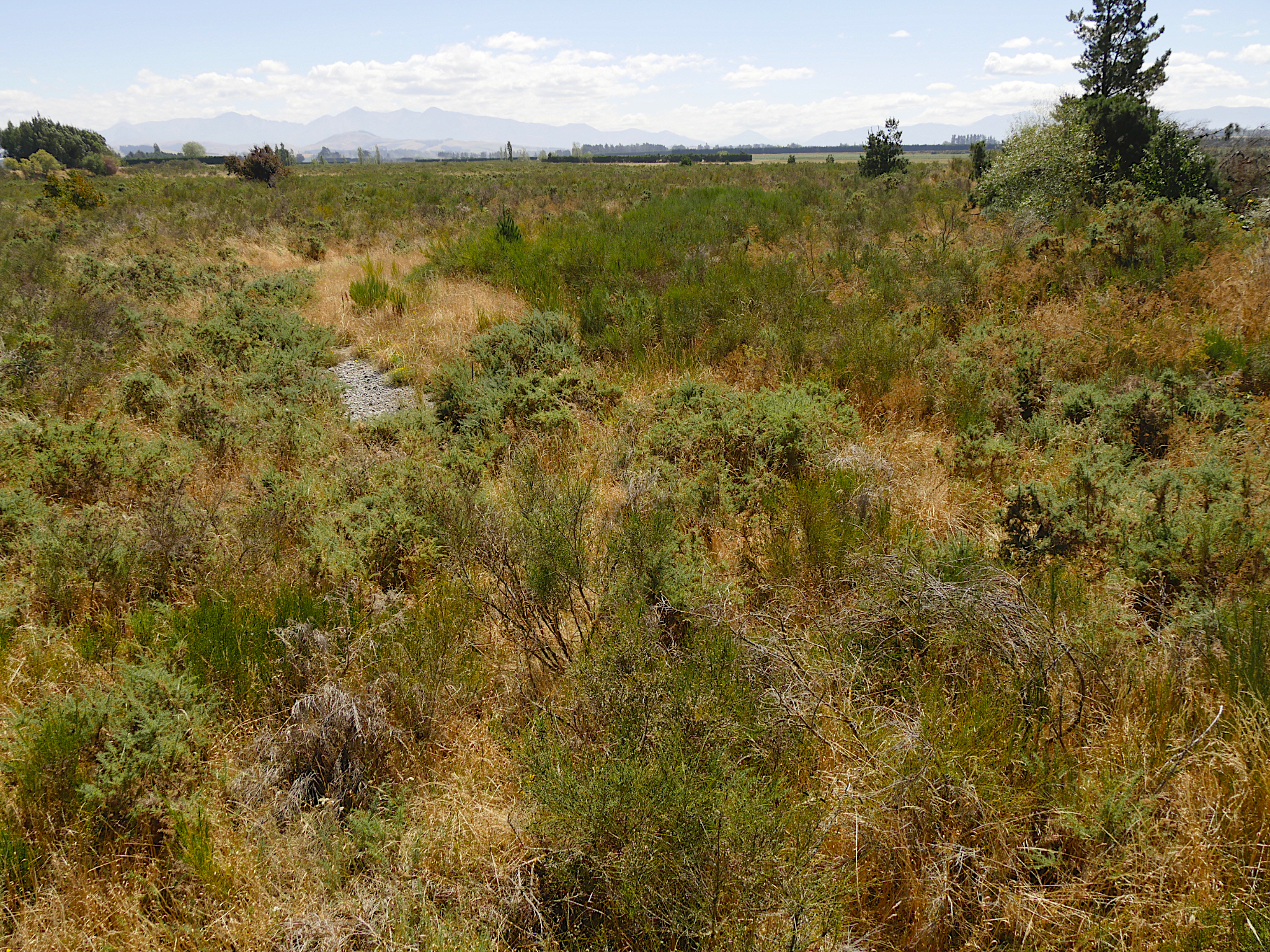
- Hawkins River, 2017. Torlesses Range in the background
- Interactive map of Hawkins
- Coordinates: 43.4830°S 172.05630°E
- Country: New Zealand
- Region: Canterbury
- Territorial authority: Selwyn District
- Ward: Malvern
- Electorates: Selwyn; Te Tai Tonga
- Elevation: 214 m (702 ft)
- Time zone: UTC+12 (New Zealand Standard Time)
  - Summer (DST): UTC+13 (New Zealand Daylight Time)
- Postcode: 7571
- Area code: 03

Hawkins is a rural settlement located in the Selwyn District of the Canterbury region of New Zealand's South Island. It is located on State Highway 77, and is 5 kilometres (3.1 mi) west from Darfield and 9 kilometres (5.6 mi) east of Glentunnel.

Rata Lovell-Smith's most famous painting, Hawkins, painted in 1933, was of the railway station here. The painting is now owned by the Christchurch Art Gallery, having purchased it in 1981.

The Hawkins River traverses through the western end of the settlement. However, the river does not flow here, only doing so during periods of heavy rain and flooding.

Hawkins is part of the Glentunnel statistical area.

== History ==
Hawkins was served by the Whitecliffs Branch, a branch line railway, from the line's opening on 3 November 1875 through to its closure on 31 March 1962. Apart from embankments around the Hawkins River, no evidence of the railway remains.

== Facilities ==
=== Bangor Estate ===
Named after Viscount Bangor, the estate was established in the 1850s. It now hosts a wedding venue and function centre in a separate building. The original wooden homestead is still occupied, having recently been renovated and modelled on Castle Ward. The estate also boasts large 160-year old oak forests.
