= Aylesbury, New Zealand =

Settlement in the Canterbury region of New Zealand

- Settlement
- Interactive map of Aylesbury, New Zealand
- Coordinates: 43.530349°S 172.268468°E
- Country: New Zealand
- Region: Canterbury
- Territorial authority: Selwyn District
- Ward: Malvern
- Electorates: Selwyn; Te Tai Tonga
- Elevation: 120 m (390 ft)
- Time zone: UTC+12 (New Zealand Standard Time)
  - Summer (DST): UTC+13 (New Zealand Daylight Time)
- Area code: 03

Aylesbury is a settlement in the Canterbury region of New Zealand. It can be found between the towns of Rolleston and Kirwee.

The epicentre of the 7.1 magnitude Canterbury earthquake on 4 September 2010, was very close to Aylesbury and the largest land surface fractures were in this locality.

Aylesbury had a station on the Midland line from 1 December 1874 to 18 February 1979. It was called Bealey Road, or Bealey's Road, until 7 April 1879, West Melton until 1 October that year and Lovat, until it was renamed Aylesbury from 1 February 1880. Aylesbury was the scene of a train crash on 30 March 1938, with the death of a fireman, who jumped from a train. There was no death or injury in another crash in 1942, but the goods shed and passenger shelter were in the background of a photo of it. The shelter had replaced the station buildings after they had been moved to Darfield, following a fire there in 1887.
