= Malvern Hills (disambiguation) =

Malvern Hills is a range of hills in England.

Malvern Hills may also refer to:

== New Zealand ==
- Malvern Hills, New Zealand, Canterbury

== United Kingdom ==
- Malvern Hills Conservators, a body set up to manage the Malvern Hills
- Malvern Hills District, a district of Worcestershire, England
- Malvern Hills AONB (Malvern Hills Area of Outstanding Natural Beauty), on the border of Herefordshire and Worcestershire, England

== See also ==
- Malvern Hill, Virginia, United States
