= Homebush, New Zealand =

Settlement in the Canterbury region of New Zealand

Homebush
- Settlement
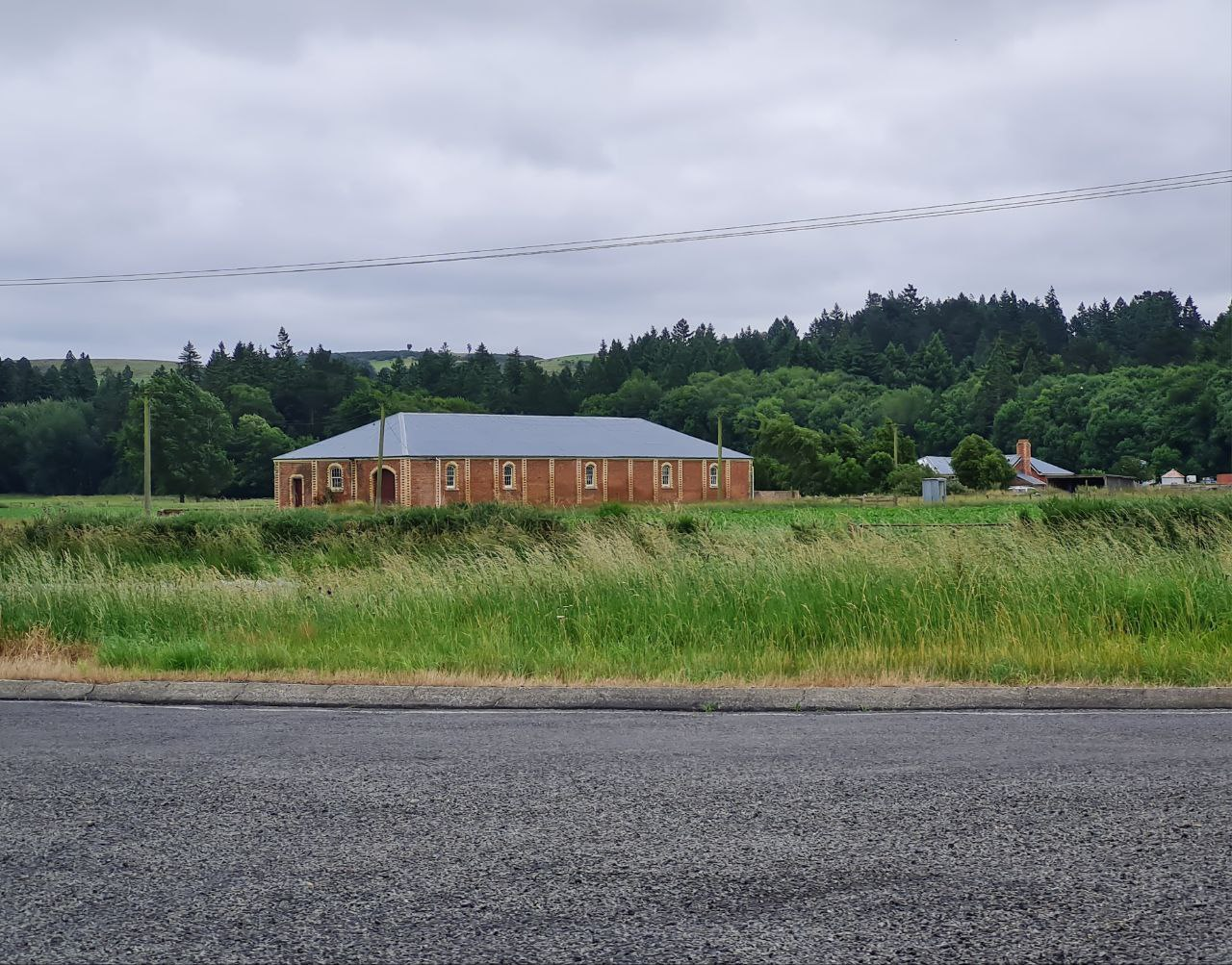
- The Homebush Station Woolshed and Shearer's Quarters, December 2023
- Interactive map of Homebush
- Coordinates: 43.4762°S 172.0106°E
- Country: New Zealand
- Region: Canterbury
- Territorial authority: Selwyn District
- Electorates: Selwyn; Te Tai Tonga

Population (2018)
  - Total: 1,191 (Note: Total population includes the urban areas of Coalgate, Glentunnel and Whitecliffs)
- Time zone: UTC+12 (New Zealand Standard Time)
  - Summer (DST): UTC+13 (New Zealand Daylight Time)
- Area code: 03

Homebush is a settlement in the Canterbury region of New Zealand. It has had a long association with the pioneering Deans family.

== History ==
Due to the area's surrounding industry, Homebush was connected to the Whitecliffs Branch, which operated from 1875 until 1962. The railway station (built in 1875) was located on Yeomans Road. The building is now located in Darfield at the branch's historical site.

=== 2010 Canterbury earthquake ===
The historic Homebush Homestead owned by the Deans family was destroyed during the earthquake. It was rebuilt four years later.

== Film ==
Homebush's forests (located in the homestead gardens) were used as a filming location for the 2005 Narnia film, The Lion, The Witch and the Wardrobe.

== Landmarks ==
A number of historic farms buildings are located around Homebush. These building were primarily used for use by the Homebush Station. These include:

- The water turbine, which was constructed in 1880 and incorporated into its own room in the stables, was used to drive farm machinery such as saw bench, chaff cutter, wheat mill, whetstone, and seed dresser. A 60 meters (200 feet) underground brick tunnel was built to bring water from the dammed up Waianiwaniwa River down to a circular brick well in which the turbine sits. Another tunnel was also built. This tunnel, approximately 150 meters (490 feet) in length, drained the water away. The turbine is thought to be the only one of its type in New Zealand and may be the only one in the world. A water tower was built outside the entrance to the turbine room and still stands.
- The stables are located south of the homestead.
- The brick woolshed, as well as the shearers' quarters (brick house to the north of the shed) can be seen from the main road at the intersection of Deans Road and Bangor/Homebush Road.
