= Whitecliffs Branch historical site =

Historical railway site in New Zealand

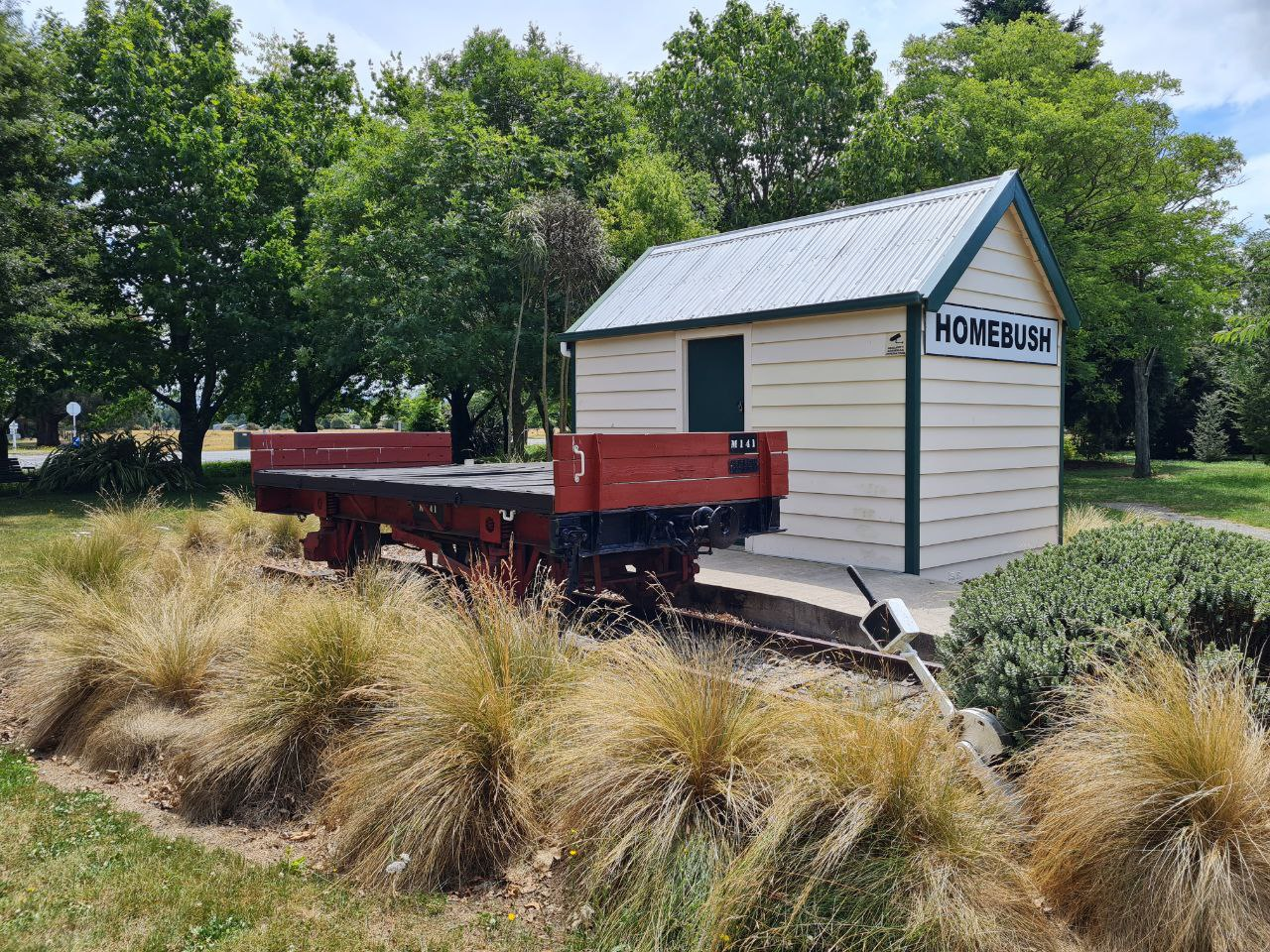
- The historical site, January 2024
- Interactive map of Whitecliffs Branch historical site
- 43°29′18″S 172°06′23″E
- Location: Westview Park, Darfield, New Zealand

History
- Opened: 6 February 2015; 11 years, 6 months and 9 days
- Built for: Whitecliffs Branch
- Original use: Railway Station

Site notes
- Elevation: 201 m (659 ft)
- Restored: 2014–2015
- Current use: Memorial and museum

The Whitecliffs Branch historical site is an historical site containing the original, restored Homebush station building and a NZR type M wagon. The site was dedicated to the Whitecliffs Branch to commemorate the 50th anniversary of the line closing. It was officially opened on 6 February 2015 by Don Chambers at Westview Park, Darfield, New Zealand, near to the site of the junction (White Cliffs Junction/Horndon Junction/Darfield Junction).

== History ==
The Whitecliffs Branch was an 18.4 kilometres (11.4 mi) long branch line railway that formed part of New Zealand's national rail network in the Canterbury Region of the South Island. It operated from November 1875 until March 1962. The predominant traffic on the line was lignite coal from the mines, with two private lines running to industries from the branch; one in Glentunnel for the Homebush Brick and Tile Company, and the other in Coalgate for the Homebush Coal Company.

== Construction ==
=== Homebush Station ===
Many of the Homebush Station buildings were erected during the 1870s; the property is located at 2142 Homebush Road. The homestead itself was built between 1904 and 1909. It was donated by the Slattery Family estate and restored to its 1947 appearance, with help from Jack Blair and Brian Marsh.

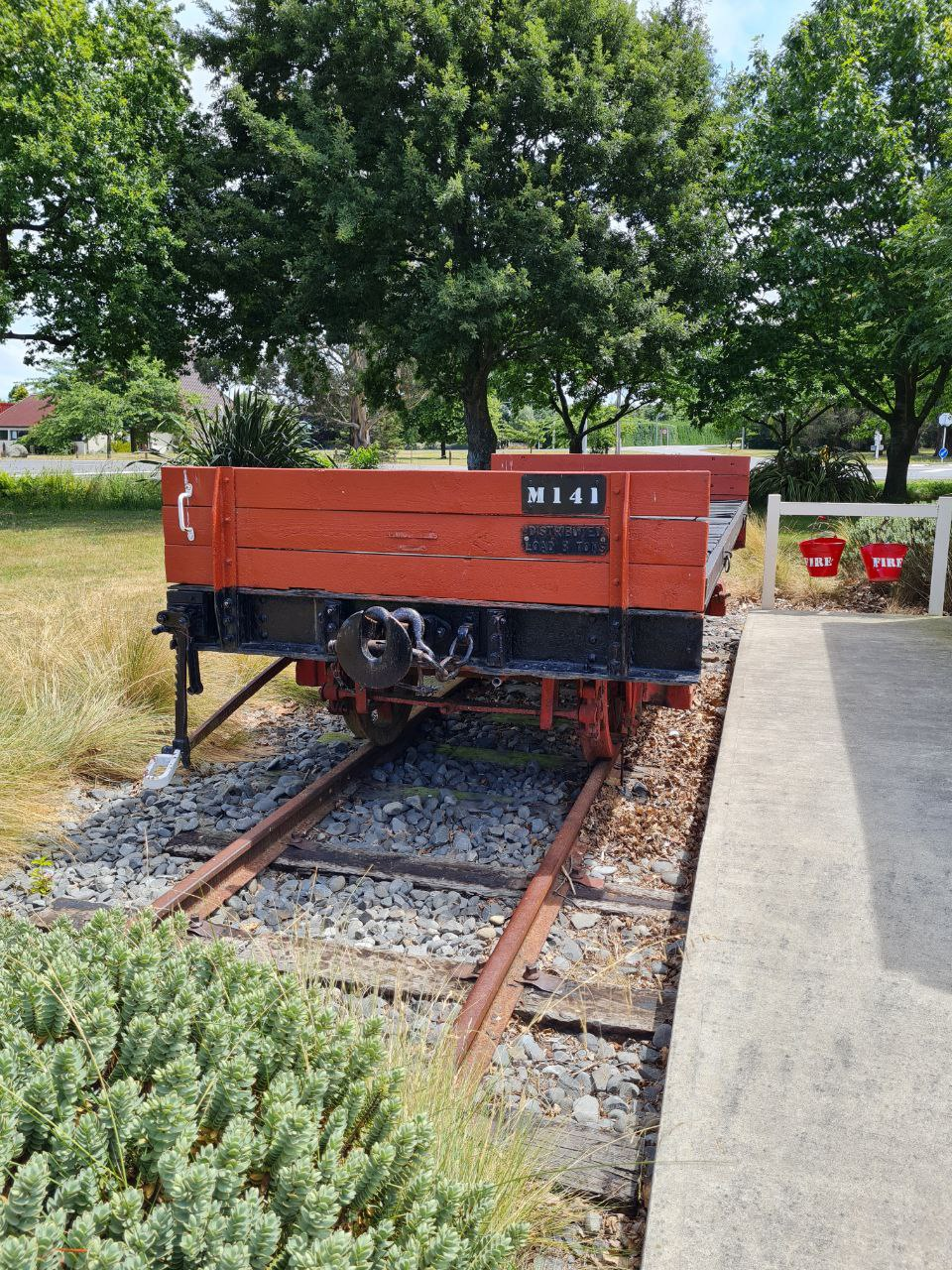
The NZR M type wagon (No. M141)

=== NZR M Wagon ===
The NZR M type Wagon (No. M141) was built in 1900 at the Hillside Workshops in Dunedin. It was decommissioned in October 1970 and then used at the Islington New Zealand Electricity Department (NZED) substation yard to transport electricity department poles and equipment. The wagon was purchased by Matthew Williams in 1992 from Transpower after the siding was removed from the substation.

The wagon originally had an Australian hard wood deck, but was replaced with pinus during restoration. Restoration of the wagon was completed by Matthew Williams.

=== Other features ===
Two other features included in the historical site are:

- Points lever donated by the Russell Williams Museum
- Rail set donated by the Canterbury Steam Preservation Society (McLeans Island Steamscene)
