= Darfield High School =

- Te Kura Tuarua o Tawera

Location
- 7 McLaughlins Road; Darfield, 7510; New Zealand; 43°29′24″S 172°06′11″E

Information
- Type: State secondary
- Established: 1951; 75 years ago
- Ministry of Education Institution no.: 346
- Principal: Andy England
- Gender: Co-educational
- Enrolment: 815 (July 2026)
- Website: darfield.school.nz

Darfield High School is a secondary school in Darfield, New Zealand. As of July 2026, it had 815 students.

== History ==
Darfield High School was established in 1951. The 2010 Darfield earthquake caused some damage to the school. In 2018 it was reported that Darfield High School was the "most crowded school in the South Island" due to a lack of building new classrooms. In 2022 the school had a "drive your tractor to school" day as an extension to mufti day.

== Enrolment ==
As of July 2026, Darfield High School has roll of 815 students, of which 116 (14.2%) identify as Māori.

As of 2026, the school has an Equity Index of 447, placing it amongst schools whose students have below average socioeconomic barriers to achievement (roughly equivalent to decile 7 under the former socio-economic decile system).

== Notable alumni ==
- Tim Bond
- Henry Shipley
