= Kirwee =

Settlement in Canterbury, New Zealand

- Minor urban area
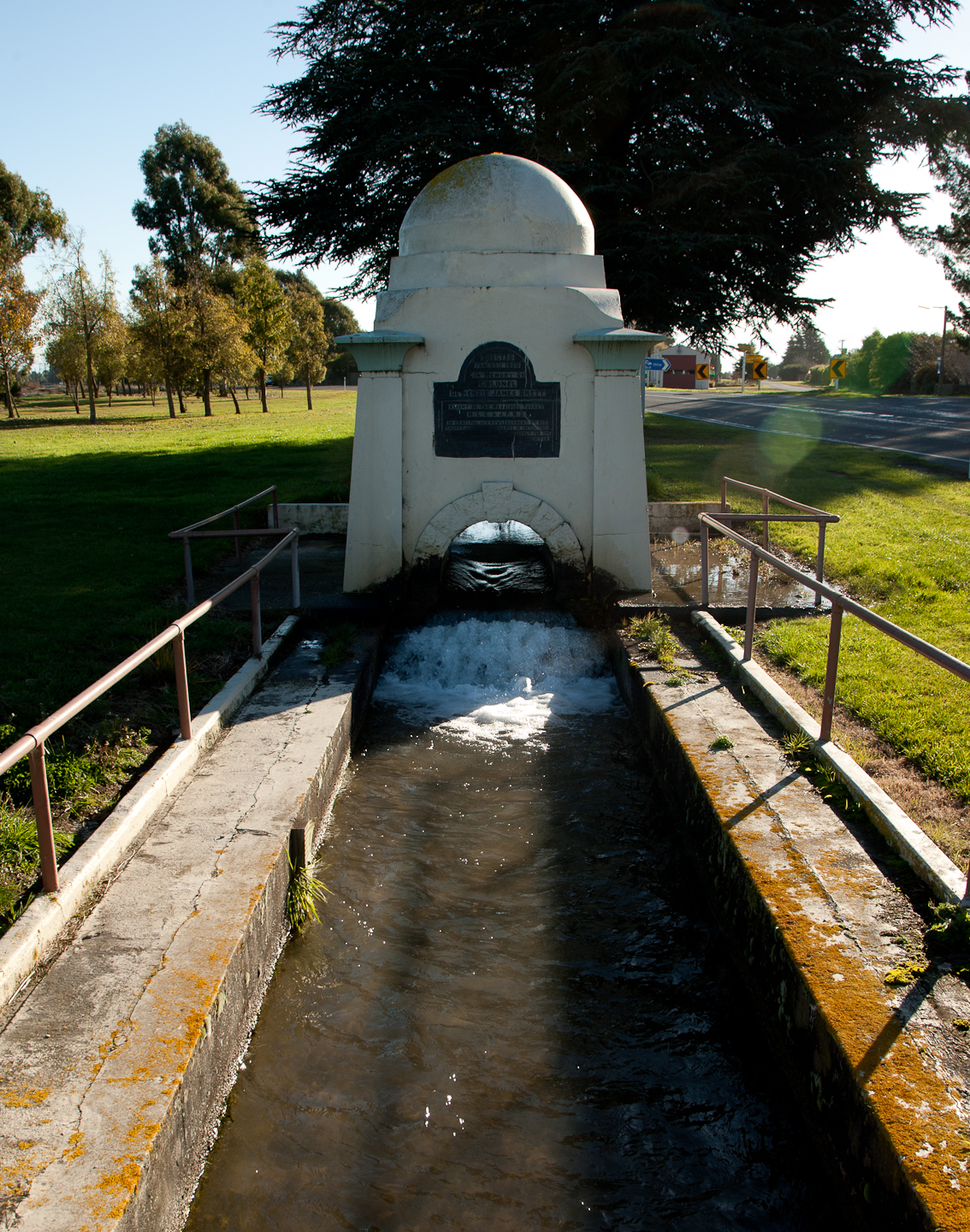
- De Renzie Brett memorial in Kirwee
- Interactive map of Kirwee
- Coordinates: 43°30′S 172°13′E
- Country: New Zealand
- Region: Canterbury
- Territorial authority: Selwyn District
- Ward: Malvern
- Community: Malvern
- Electorates: Selwyn; Te Tai Tonga (Māori)

Government
  - Territorial authority: Selwyn District Council
  - Regional council: Environment Canterbury
  - Mayor of Selwyn: Lydia Gliddon
  - Selwyn MP: Nicola Grigg
  - Te Tai Tonga MP: Tākuta Ferris

Area
  - Total: 4.21 km^{2} (1.63 sq mi)
- Elevation: 157 m (515 ft)

Population (June 2025)
  - Total: 1,200
  - Density: 290/km^{2} (740/sq mi)
- Time zone: UTC+12 (New Zealand Standard Time)
  - Summer (DST): UTC+13 (New Zealand Daylight Time)
- Postcode: 7530
- Area code: 03

Kirwee is a town located west of Christchurch in the Canterbury region of New Zealand's South Island. It was named after Karwi in India by retired British Army colonel De Renzie Brett. Kirwee is also home to the South Island Agricultural Field Days, held biennially.

== History ==
In the early 1870s, Kirwee was intended to be the junction of two branch lines, one to Whitecliffs and the other to Sheffield and Springfield. The line from Kirwee to Darfield, intended to be the first portion of the Whitecliffs Branch, was built first and the decision was taken to establish the junction of the two branches in Darfield instead. The section of line from Kirwee to Darfield, as well as the branch to Sheffield and Springfield are now part of the Midland Line.

On 25 December 2019, the historic pub was gutted by a fire. It was demolished in May 2020.

== Demographics ==
Kirwee is described by Stats NZ as a rural settlement, and covers 4.21 km^{2} (1.63 sq mi). It had an estimated population of 1,200 as of June 2025, with a population density of 285 people per km^{2}. It is part of the Kirwee statistical area.

Historical population for Kirwee settlement
Year	Pop.	±% p.a.
2006	603	—
2013	768	+3.52%
2018	972	+4.82%
2023	1,122	+2.91%
The 2006 population is for a smaller area of 3.68 km^{2}. Source:

Kirwee settlement had a population of 1,122 in the 2023 New Zealand census, an increase of 150 people (15.4%) since the 2018 census, and an increase of 354 people (46.1%) since the 2013 census. There were 558 males and 564 females in 417 dwellings. 1.3% of people identified as LGBTIQ+. The median age was 41.8 years (compared with 38.1 years nationally). There were 234 people (20.9%) aged under 15 years, 138 (12.3%) aged 15 to 29, 573 (51.1%) aged 30 to 64, and 177 (15.8%) aged 65 or older.

People could identify as more than one ethnicity. The results were 92.8% European (Pākehā), 6.7% Māori, 1.9% Pasifika, 3.2% Asian, and 3.7% other, which includes people giving their ethnicity as "New Zealander". English was spoken by 97.6%, Māori by 1.6%, Samoan by 0.3%, and other languages by 6.4%. No language could be spoken by 1.9% (e.g. too young to talk). New Zealand Sign Language was known by 0.3%. The percentage of people born overseas was 20.3, compared with 28.8% nationally.

Religious affiliations were 28.9% Christian, 0.5% Hindu, 0.3% Māori religious beliefs, 0.3% Buddhist, 0.5% New Age, and 1.9% other religions. People who answered that they had no religion were 59.1%, and 8.6% of people did not answer the census question.

Of those at least 15 years old, 213 (24.0%) people had a bachelor's or higher degree, 519 (58.4%) had a post-high school certificate or diploma, and 153 (17.2%) people exclusively held high school qualifications. The median income was $55,300, compared with $41,500 nationally. 138 people (15.5%) earned over $100,000 compared to 12.1% nationally. The employment status of those at least 15 was 525 (59.1%) full-time, 144 (16.2%) part-time, and 12 (1.4%) unemployed.

=== Kirwee statistical area ===
Kirwee statistical area covers 97.19 km^{2} (37.53 sq mi). It had an estimated population of 1,580 as of June 2025, with a population density of 16.3 people per km^{2}.

Historical population for Kirwee statistical area
Year	Pop.	±% p.a.
2006	918	—
2013	1,101	+2.63%
2018	1,275	+2.98%
2023	1,494	+3.22%

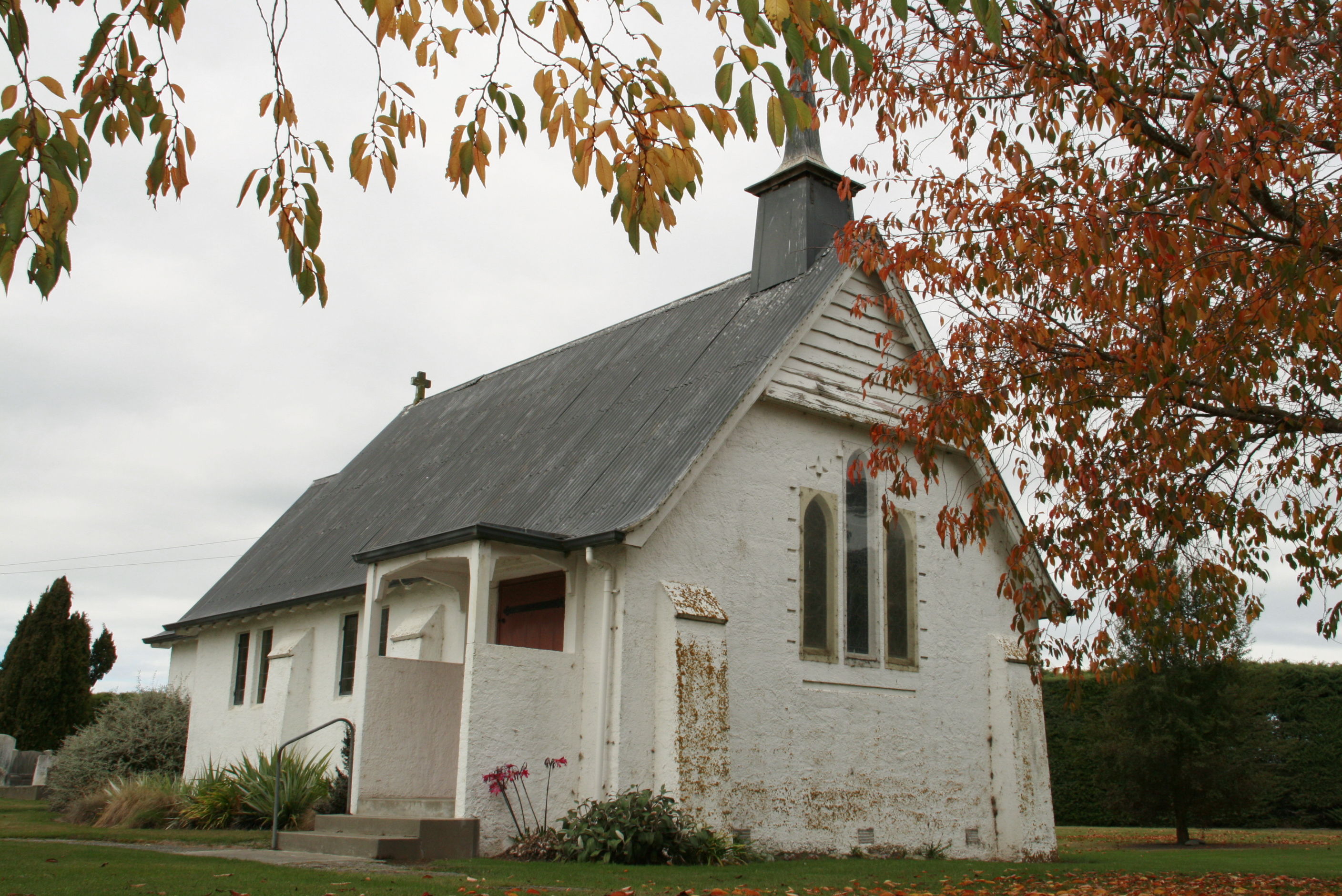
St Mathews Church, April 2012

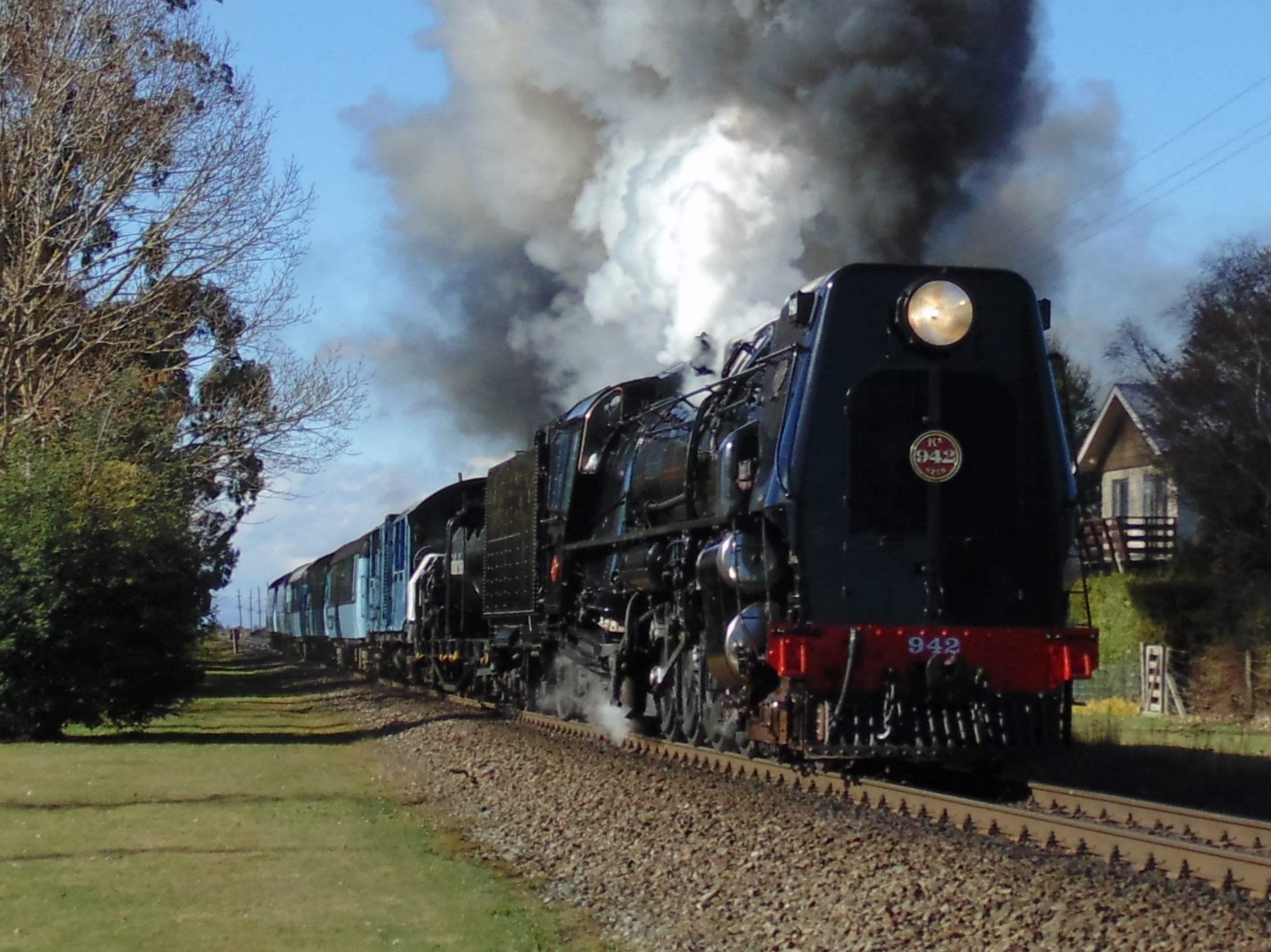
Ka 942 "Nigel Bruce" in Kirwee with an excursion to Arthurs Pass, August 2014

The statistical area had a population of 1,494 in the 2023 New Zealand census, an increase of 219 people (17.2%) since the 2018 census, and an increase of 393 people (35.7%) since the 2013 census. There were 744 males, 750 females, and 3 people of other genders in 552 dwellings. 2.0% of people identified as LGBTIQ+. The median age was 40.9 years (compared with 38.1 years nationally). There were 321 people (21.5%) aged under 15 years, 192 (12.9%) aged 15 to 29, 741 (49.6%) aged 30 to 64, and 240 (16.1%) aged 65 or older.

People could identify as more than one ethnicity. The results were 94.4% European (Pākehā); 6.2% Māori; 1.6% Pasifika; 2.6% Asian; 0.4% Middle Eastern, Latin American and African New Zealanders (MELAA); and 3.2% other, which includes people giving their ethnicity as "New Zealander". English was spoken by 97.4%, Māori by 1.2%, Samoan by 0.2%, and other languages by 5.2%. No language could be spoken by 2.2% (e.g. too young to talk). New Zealand Sign Language was known by 0.2%. The percentage of people born overseas was 17.7, compared with 28.8% nationally.

Religious affiliations were 29.9% Christian, 0.4% Hindu, 0.2% Māori religious beliefs, 0.2% Buddhist, 0.6% New Age, and 1.4% other religions. People who answered that they had no religion were 59.0%, and 7.8% of people did not answer the census question.

Of those at least 15 years old, 282 (24.0%) people had a bachelor's or higher degree, 693 (59.1%) had a post-high school certificate or diploma, and 198 (16.9%) people exclusively held high school qualifications. The median income was $54,200, compared with $41,500 nationally. 180 people (15.3%) earned over $100,000 compared to 12.1% nationally. The employment status of those at least 15 was 708 (60.4%) full-time, 183 (15.6%) part-time, and 15 (1.3%) unemployed.

== Transport ==
State Highway 73 and the Midland Line railway both pass through the town. Kirwee is also serviced with the 86 bus route.

== Education ==
Kirwee Model School is a contributing primary school catering for years 1 to 6. It had a roll of 145 as of July 2026. The school opened in 1881.
