= McHughs Forest Park =

Coordinates: 43°28′16.7″S 172°5′36.0″E

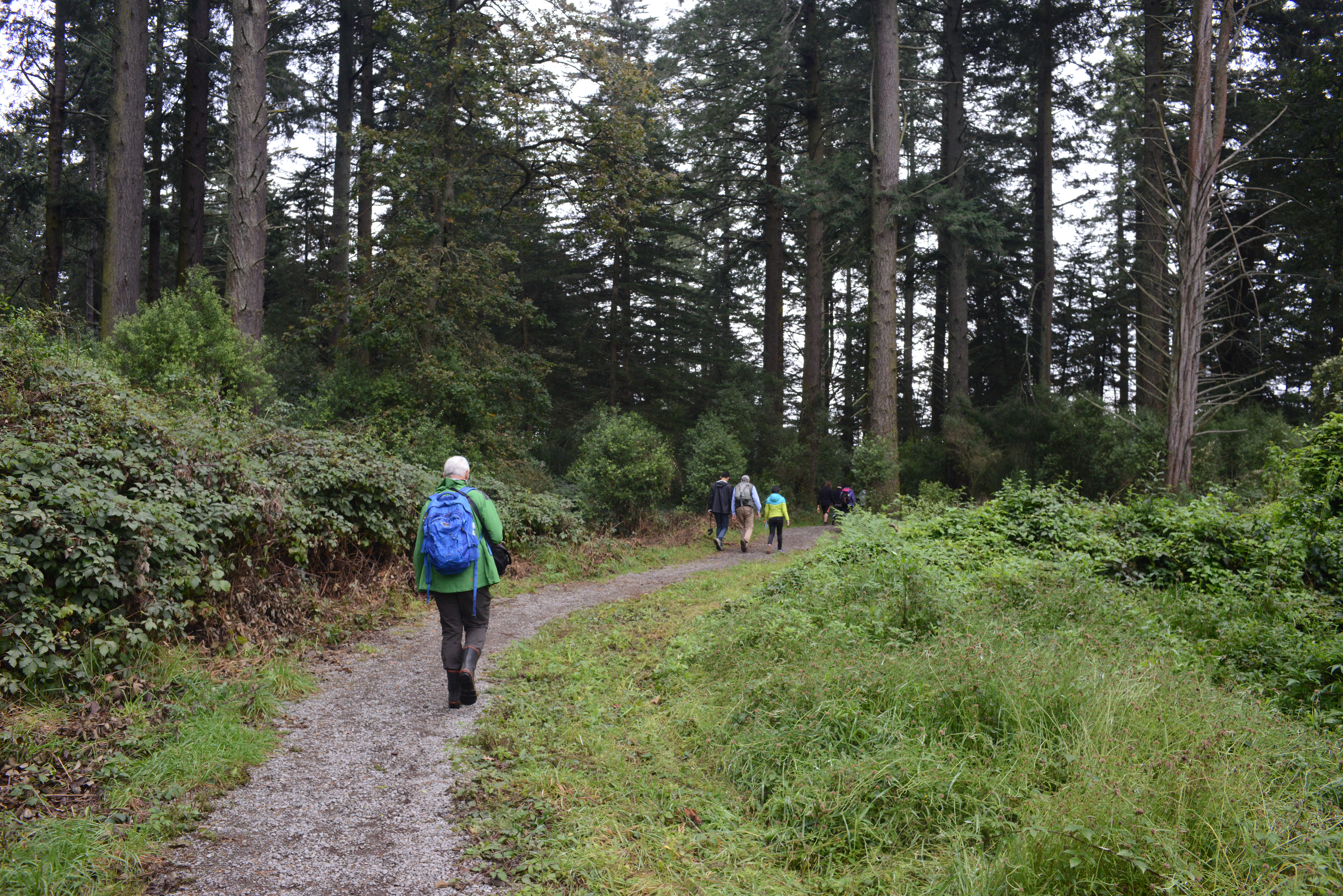
McHughs Forest

McHughs Forest Park is a 43 hectare public recreational reserve on the edge of Darfield town in the Selwyn District of the South Island of New Zealand. It was established in 1893 as a plantation forest for timber and shelter, dominated by Douglas fir but with a mix of other exotic conifers.

McHughs Forest Park was formerly part of the Selwyn Plantation Board’s forest holdings and is now owned by the Selwyn District Council and publicly accessible with a diversity of walking tracks. In 1986 Dereck Rooney described McHughs Forest as "the third-best Douglas fir stand in New Zealand".

Under the planted conifer canopy is extensive natural regeneration of both native and exotic plants which harbour a diversity of animals and fungi. Members of the Canterbury Botanical Society recorded 18 ferns inside McHughs Plantation in 1986, 17 of them indigenous to New Zealand.
