= Homebush Homestead =

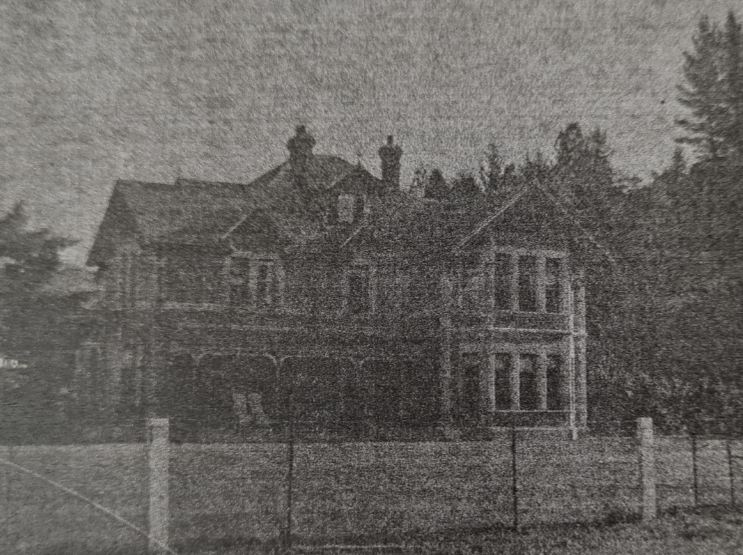
- Photograph showing the former Homebush Homestead
- Etymology: Homebush, Canterbury

General information
- Type: Homestead
- Architectural style: Victorian and Edwardian
- Location: Homebush, 2142 Homebush Road, New Zealand
- Coordinates: 43.4714°S 171.9947°E
- Elevation: 224 metres
- Completed: 1903
- Owner: Deans family

Technical details
- Material: Brick; timber
- Floor count: Two

Design and construction
- Known for: Deans' Homebush Station

Website
- Official

Homebush Homestead was an historic home in Homebush, New Zealand, belonging to the early pioneering Deans family. The homestead was severely damaged during the 2010 Canterbury earthquake. It was demolished soon after. It has since been replaced by a new building, designed by Athfield Architects Limited.

== History ==
The original triple-brick homestead was built by the New Zealand-famous Deans family, who were early pioneer settlers of the Canterbury region. The groundwork began in the 1880s and was completed by 1903. The station buildings are a Heritage New Zealand Category I historic place (#9483).

Other historic structures on the station are:

- The water turbine, which was constructed in 1880 and incorporated into its own room in the stables, was used to drive farm machinery such as saw bench, chaff cutter, wheat mill, whetstone, and seed dresser. A 60 meters (200 feet) underground brick tunnel was built to bring water from the dammed up Waianiwaniwa River down to a circular brick well in which the turbine sits. Another tunnel was also built. This tunnel, approximately 150 meters (490 feet) in length, drained the water away. The turbine is thought to be the only one of its type in New Zealand and may be the only one in the world. A water tower was built outside the entrance to the turbine room and still stands.
- The stables are located south of the homestead.
- The red and white brick woolshed completed in 1879, as well as the shearers' quarters (brick house to the north of the shed), can be seen from the main road at the intersection of Deans Road and Bangor/Homebush Road. The shed was built of bricks because there was a lack of timber in the area; the red bricks were fired on site and the white bricks came from Christchurch.

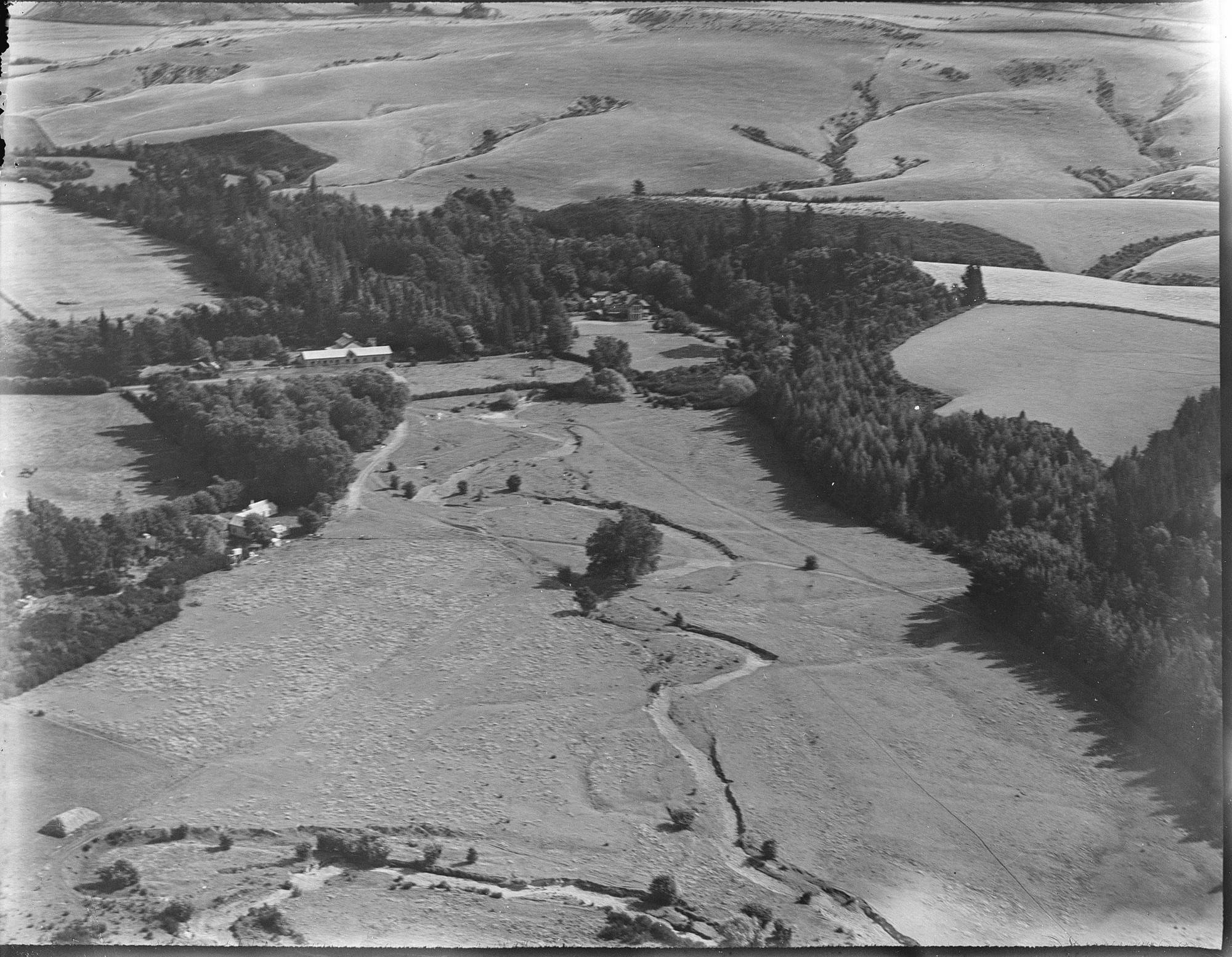
Aerial view of Homebush Homestead and surroundings

=== 2010 Canterbury earthquake ===
On 4 September 2010, the original brick homestead was left badly damaged, with the second storey partially collapsing. The occupants, Jim and Rev. Louise Deans who were in the second storey at the time of the earthquake, were able to escape without injury. In November 2010, the homestead was demolished. A new house designed by Ian Athfield was completed in 2014 and incorporates elements from the old house such as the kauri staircase.

== Tourism ==
=== Film ===
Homebush's forests (located in the homestead gardens) were used as a filming location for the 2005 Narnia film, The Lion, The Witch and the Wardrobe.

=== Gardens ===
The eight-acre garden was first planted out in the early 1850s and has been developed by the Deans family over the last 172 years. Trees were planted very early and provide a frame for the sweeping lawns, some of which have registered in the local ordinances and are recorded in books of nationally and internationally significant trees.

The avenue of Atlantic cedars up the driveway were planted in 1913.

In the 1920s and 30s, James Deans planted over a thousand different species of rhododendrons under the trees in the style of Bodnant in Northern Wales.

The circular orchard is an interesting and rare feature of the garden. It was planted out in holly in the early 1850s as a sheltered vegetable garden and tree nursery. Now it houses old roses and different varieties of fruit trees and bushes.

=== Museum ===
Even before the earthquake devastated the homestead, group tours and open days still take place. A museum is also available for viewing in the old stables, containing a collection of pioneering country life on the Canterbury Plains. The collection includes vintage farming and mining machinery, military and sporting memorabilia, and a broad collection of the everyday life of our forebears. There is also the unique Dayton, Ohio water turbine, the only known one that it is still in-situ in the world.
