= Whitecliffs Branch =

NZ South Island old rail line

Coordinates: 43.4843°S 172.0095°E

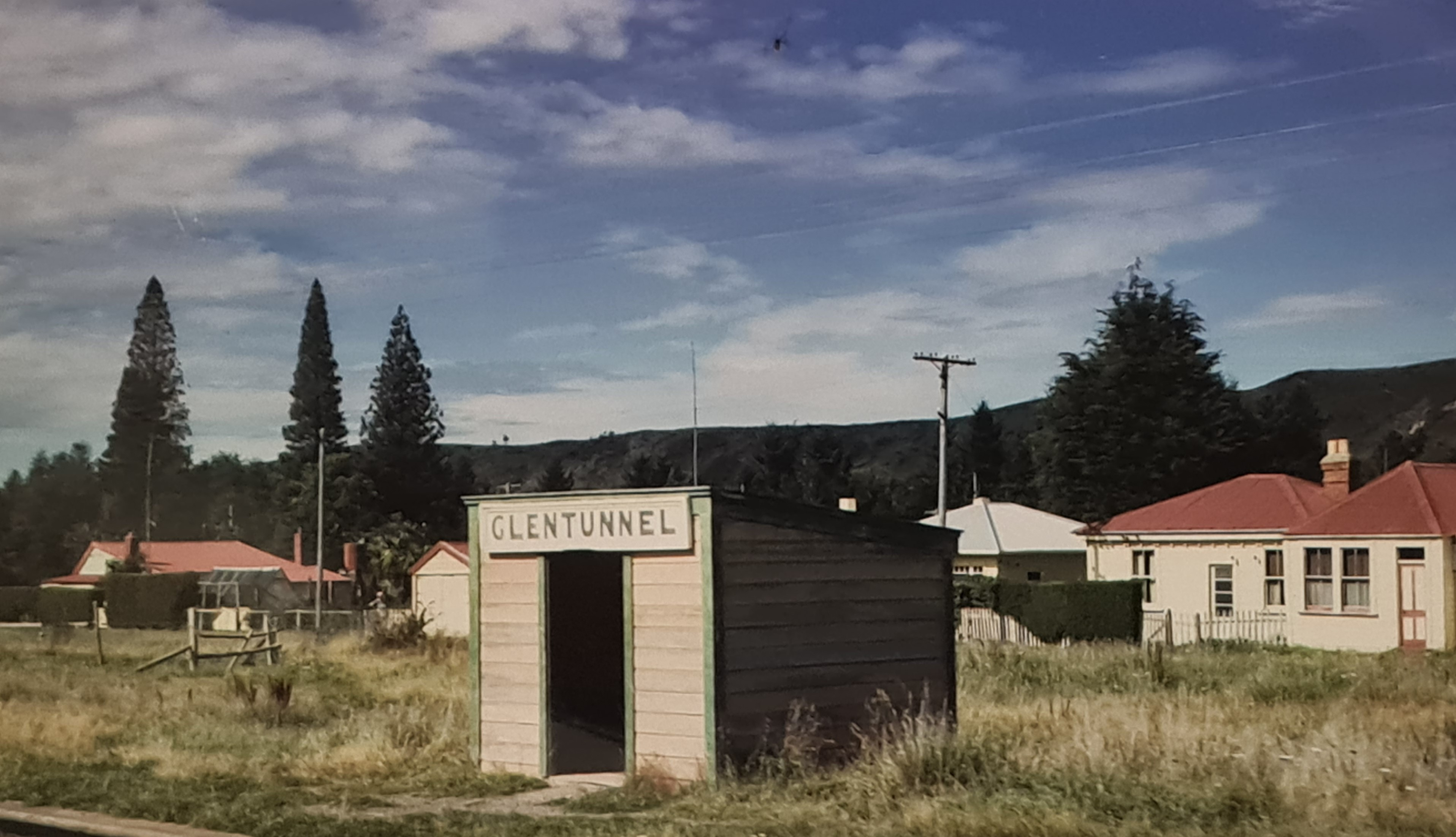
- Glentunnel Railway Station

Overview
- Status: Closed
- Owner: Railways Department
- Locale: Canterbury, New Zealand
- Termini: Darfield Junction; Whitecliffs
- Stations: 7

Service
- Type: Heavy Rail
- System: New Zealand Government Railways (NZGR)
- Operator(s): Railways Department

History
- Opened: 3 November 1875
- Closed: 31 March 1962

Technical
- Line length: 18.4 kilometres (11.4 mi)
- Number of tracks: Single
- Character: Rural
- Track gauge: 3 ft 6 in (1,067 mm)

The Whitecliffs Branch was an 18.4 kilometres (11.4 mi) long branch line railway that formed part of New Zealand's national rail network in the Canterbury region of the South Island. It was more industrial than the many rural branches on the South Island's east coast whose traffic primarily derived from agriculture, and it operated from 1875 until 1962.

== Construction ==
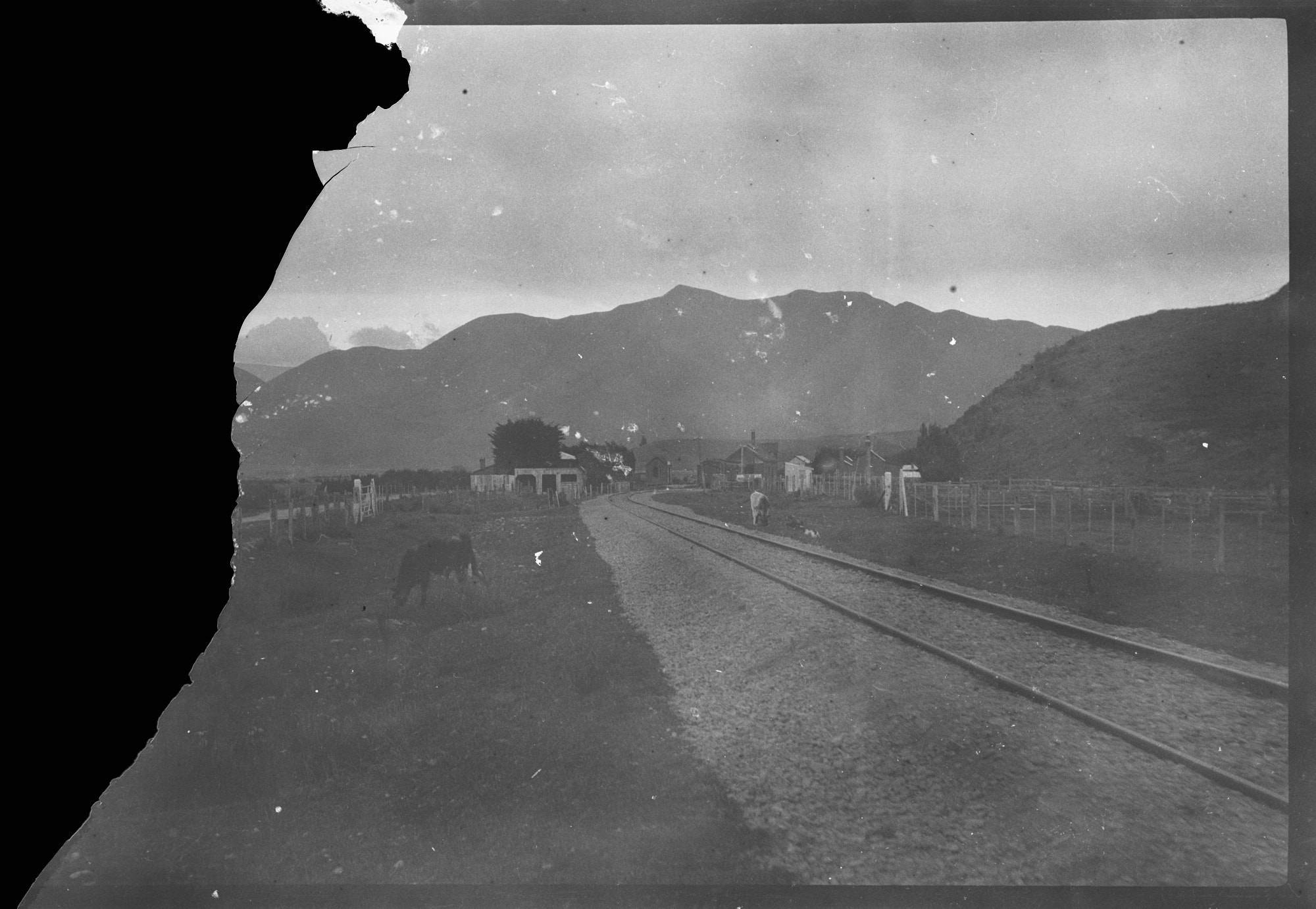
Whitecliffs Branch, date unknown

What would have been the first portion of a branch line to Whitecliffs has now become part of the Midland Line. The original plan was for a straight line running directly from Rolleston to Sheffield and Springfield, with a branch built from Kirwee to Darfield. When the railway reached Kirwee, the line to Darfield was built first, and it was from here that construction of two lines began. One line was built towards Sheffield and Springfield, and one towards Whitecliffs. At that stage, it was not known which, if either, would be incorporated in the line to the West Coast.

Surveys for the line from Darfield to Whitecliffs were undertaken in 1872, and with contracts let the next year, work was well underway by 1874. The line was opened all the way to Whitecliffs on 3 November 1875. Stations were established in (from junction to terminus): Hawkins, Homebush, Coalgate, Glentunnel, South Malvern, and Whitecliffs, with goods sheds located at three of these stations. Trains on the line had to deal with steep ascents between Hawkins and Homebush and on the run-up to Whitecliffs.

Three proposals existed in the 19th century regarding the extension of the line. An early proposal suggested that the Whitecliffs Branch should be extended from Whitecliffs to the West Coast via the Wilberforce River and Browning's Pass. Another proposal called for a line departing the branch at Homebush and running via Lake Lyndon up to Cass, from where it would have followed roughly the same route as the present-day line via Arthur's Pass. A third proposal received the support of an 1880 Royal Commission on New Zealand's railways, calling for an extension of the branch into the Rakaia Gorge and to the coalfields near the Acheron River. None of these proposals ever came to fruition. Another significant proposal, the Canterbury Interior Main Line, would have had its junction with the Whitecliffs Branch in Homebush.

== Stations ==
The following stations were located on the Whitecliffs Branch, in order from the junction at Darfield to the terminus:

- Hawkins
- Homebush
- Coalgate
- Glentunnel
- South Malvern
- Whitecliffs
  Map
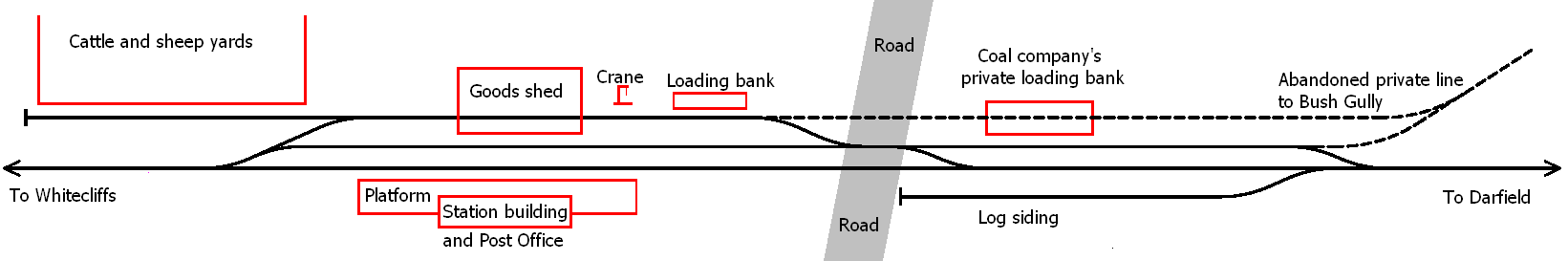
  Plan of the railway yard in Coalgate, circa 1952

== Operation ==
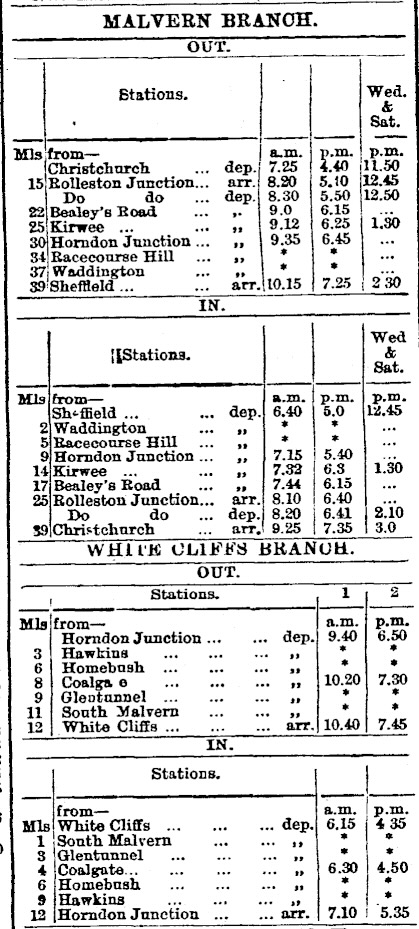
The November 1878 timetable for the Malvern (Midland) and Whitecliffs Branches

The predominant traffic on the line was lignite coal from the mines, with two private lines running to industries from the branch, one in Homebush for the Homebush Brick and Tile Company, and one in Coalgate for the Homebush Coal Company. It was this traffic that sustained the line's existence, but it did not eventuate in the quantities imagined as the Cantabrian coal fields proved to be small. Substantial quantities of wheat were shipped annually via the line, up to 1,000 tons annually in the 1890s, mainly from Coalgate station.

In 1928, passenger services were stopped and buses handled by New Zealand Railways Department were used, though passenger services – primarily picnic trains – operated sporadically until 13 March 1949. Freight trains were running thrice weekly in 1951, but losses had been mounting for two decades and the coalfield was close to being exhausted. Further declines in the volume of traffic on the line led to its closure on 31 March 1962.

== Today ==
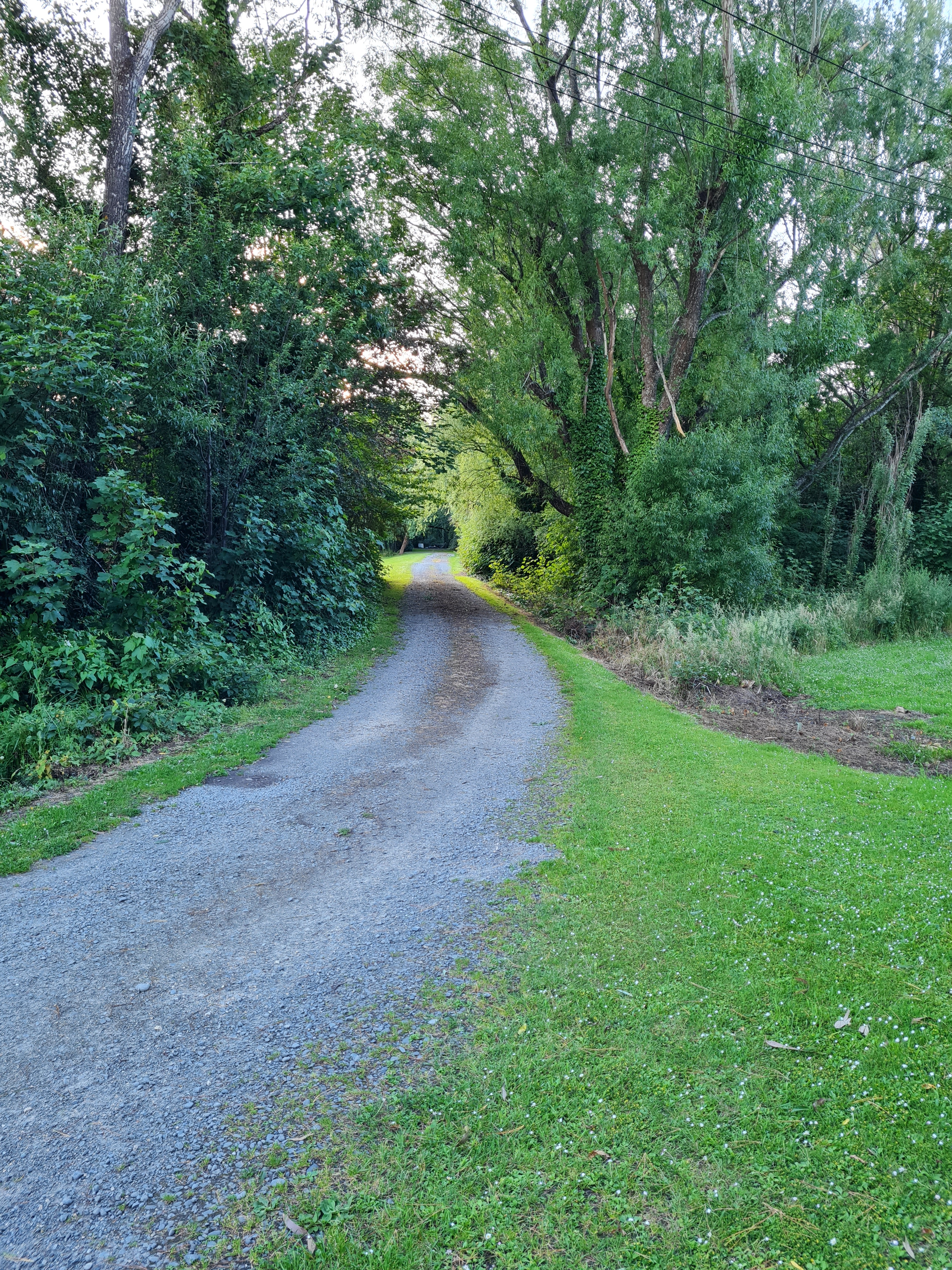
The trackbed at Philip Street, Glentunnel, now a private driveway

Some relics from the Whitecliffs Branch still exist, despite the fact that remnants of closed railways tend to disappear over time due to human and natural influences. The formation is visible in places, especially at Hawkins River. In Homebush, a bridge still spans over the Waianiwaniwa River, and some bridge abutments and piles remain in situ in fields between Deans Road and Yeomans Road. Platform edges survive in Homebush, Glentunnel and Coalgate. In Whitecliffs, the engine shed is preserved and still possesses its water tank that served steam locomotives, and a loading bank can be found nearby.

An historical site in Westview Reserve, Darfield was officially opened on 6 February 2015, 52 years after its closure. Homebush's original station building was donated by the Slattery Family Estate and then restored. It is used as a museum for the site.
