= Chaff cutter =

Device for cutting straw or hay into small pieces

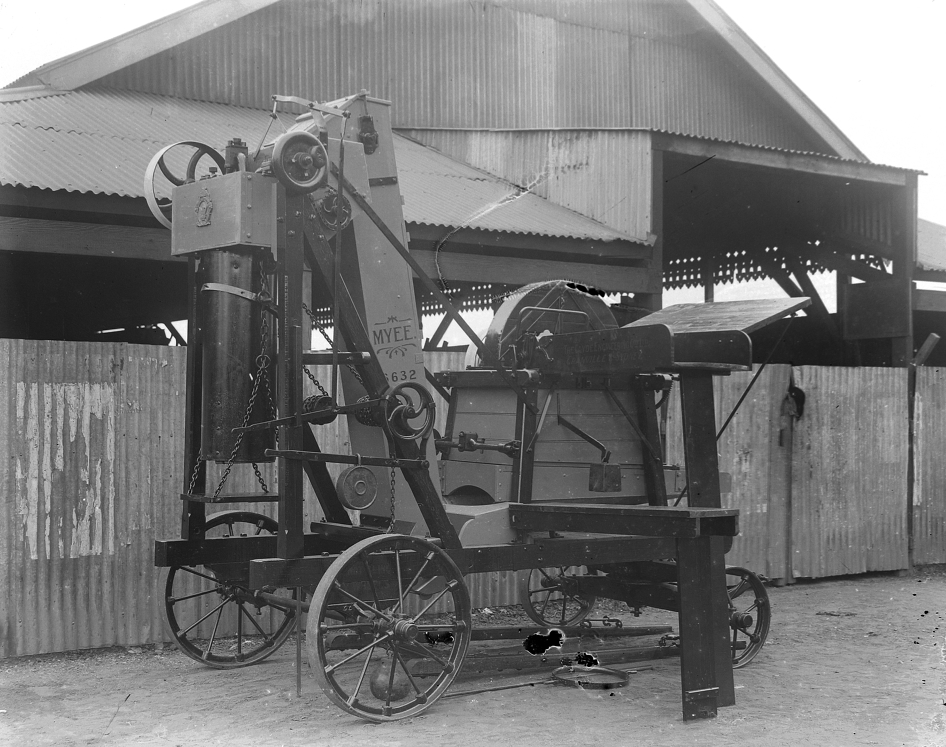
'Myee' chaff cutter from The Powerhouse Museum Collection

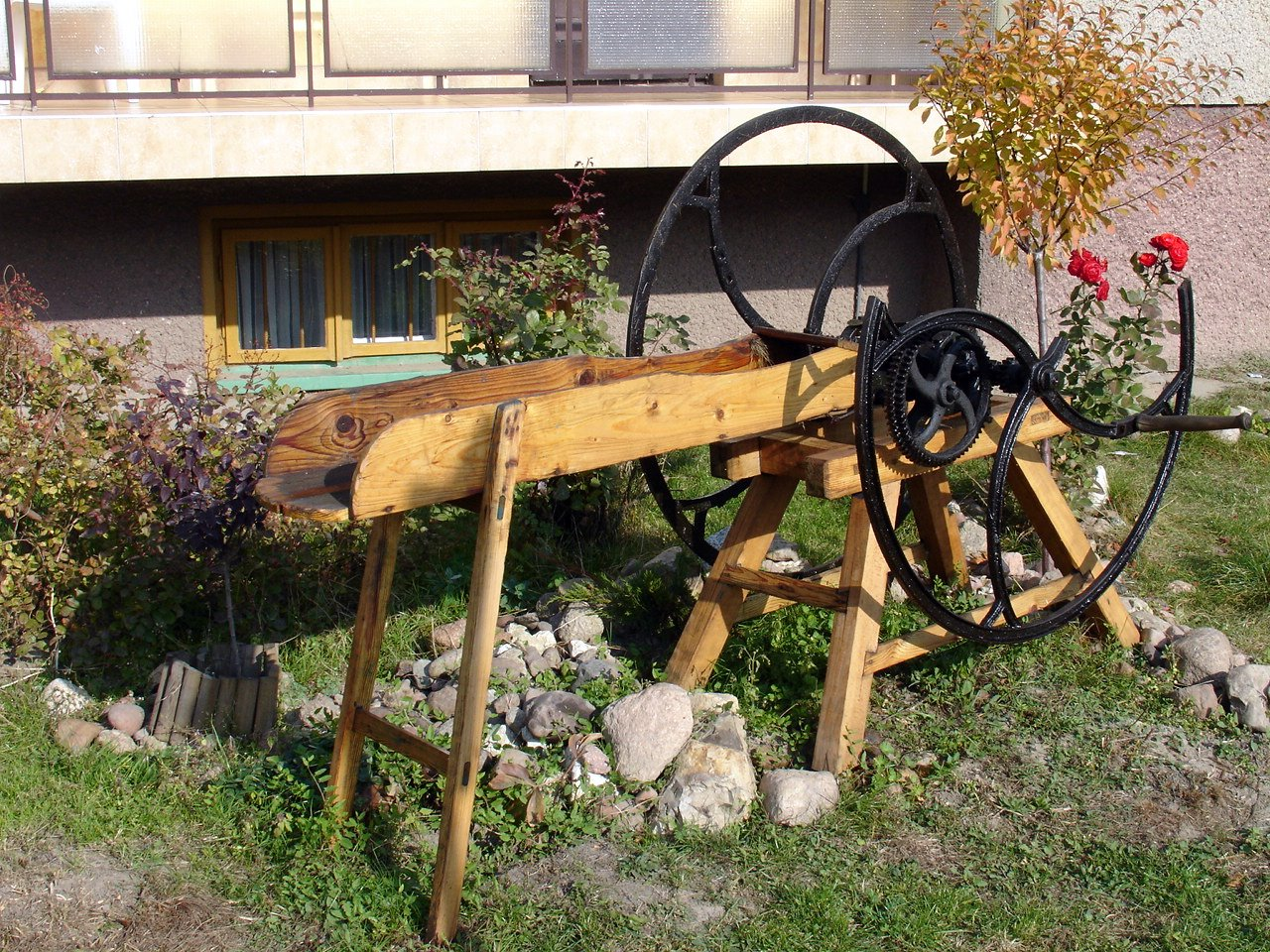
A manual chaff cutter

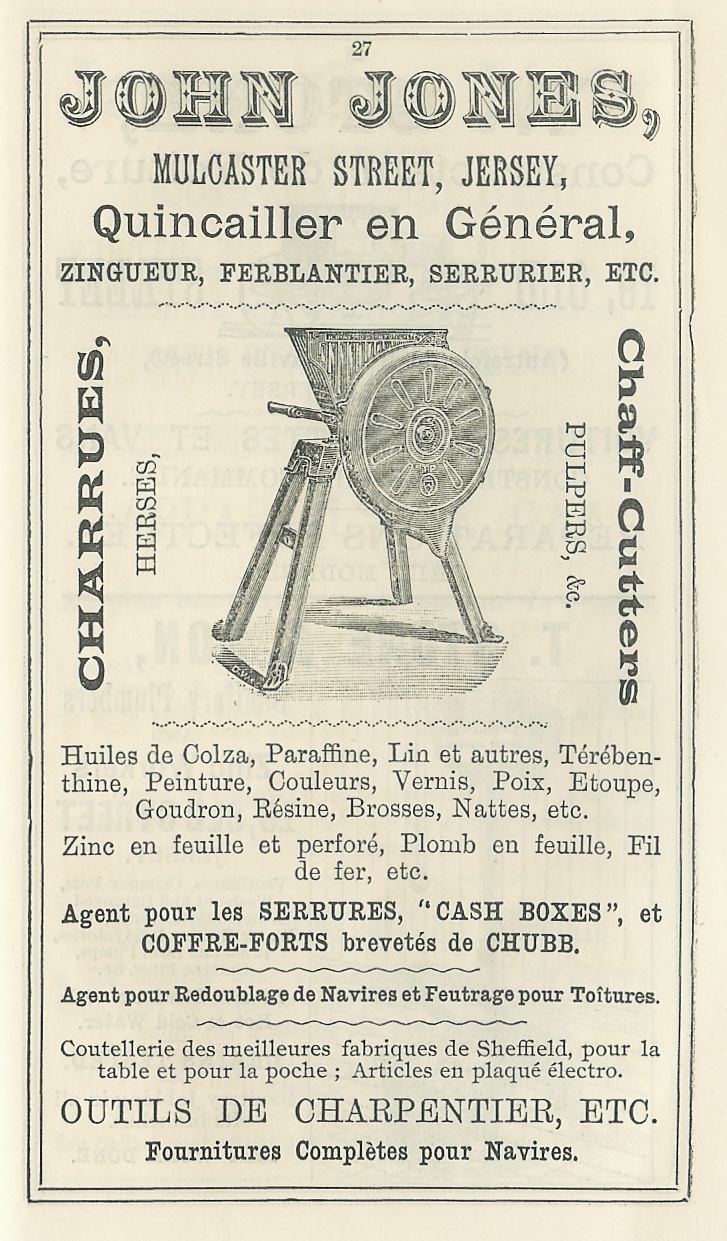
Advertisement for a chaff cutter from the Almanac of La Nouvelle Chronique de Jersey, 1892 from the island of Jersey

A chaff cutter is a mechanical device for cutting straw or hay into small pieces before being mixed together with other forage and fed to horses and cattle. This aids the animal's digestion and prevents animals from rejecting any part of their food.

Chaff and hay played a vital role in most agricultural production as it was used for feeding horses. Horses were extensively used in farming operations until they were replaced by tractors in the 1940s.

Chaff cutters have evolved from the basic machines into commercial standard machines that can be driven at various speeds and can achieve various lengths of cuts of chaff with respect to animal preference type. New chaff cutter machines include portable tractor driven chaff cutter - where chaff cutter can be in the field and load trolleys (if required).
