= Darfield, New Zealand =

Town in Canterbury, New Zealand

Darfield
- Minor urban area
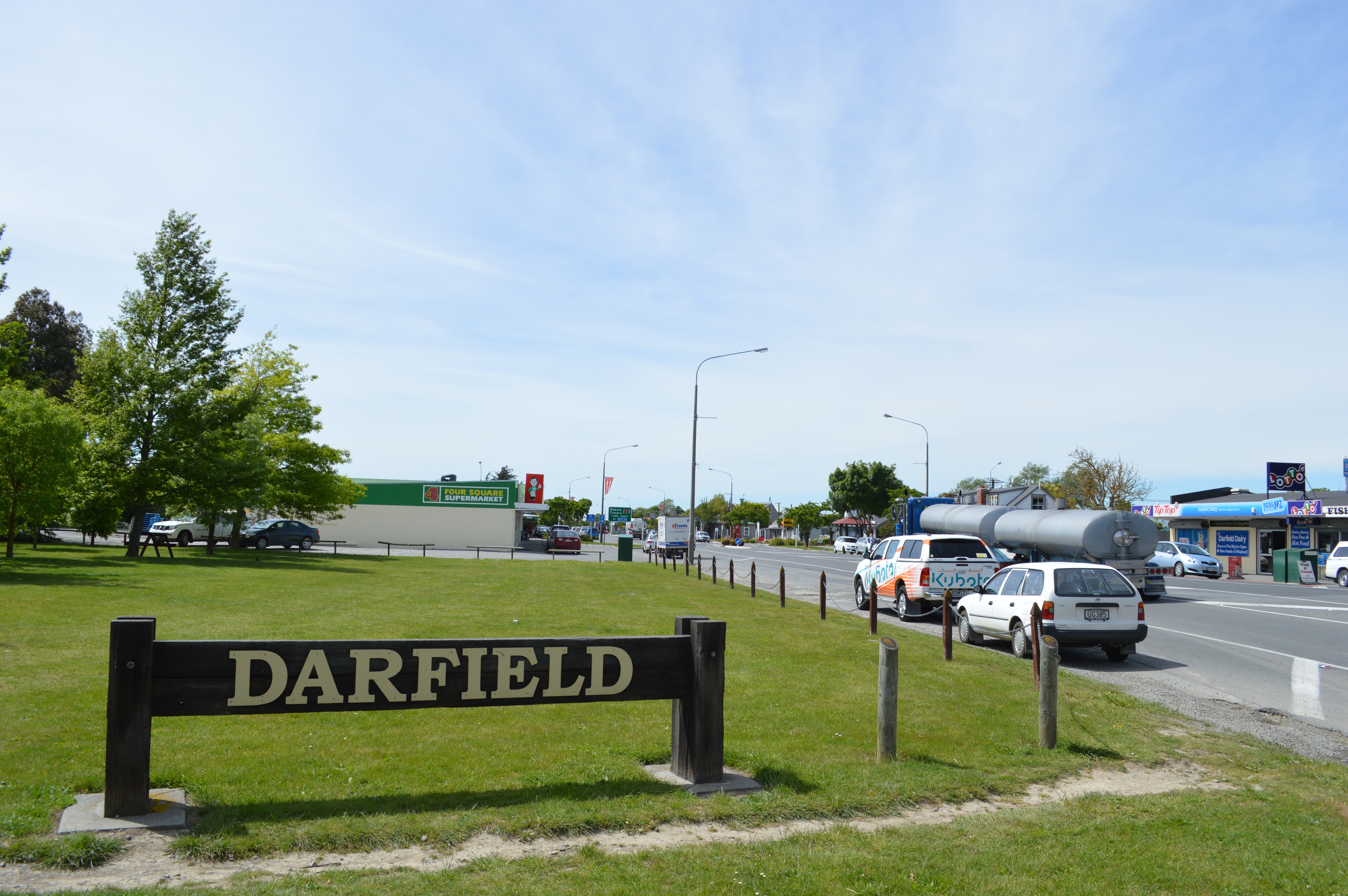
- Darfield sign on New Zealand State Highway 73, the main street of Darfield
- Interactive map of Darfield
- Coordinates: 43°29′S 172°07′E
- Country: New Zealand
- Region: Canterbury
- Territorial authority: Selwyn District
- Ward: Malvern
- Community: Malvern
- Electorates: Selwyn; Te Tai Tonga (Māori)

Government
  - Territorial authority: Selwyn District Council
  - Regional council: Environment Canterbury
  - Mayor of Selwyn: Lydia Gliddon
  - Selwyn MP: Nicola Grigg
  - Te Tai Tonga MP: Mananui Ramsden

Area
  - Total: 17.58 km^{2} (6.79 sq mi)
- Elevation: 205 m (673 ft)

Population (June 2025)
  - Total: 3,590
  - Density: 204/km^{2} (529/sq mi)
- Time zone: UTC+12 (NZST)
  - Summer (DST): UTC+13 (NZDT)
- Postcode(s): 7510
- Area code: 03
- Local iwi: Ngāi Tahu

Darfield is a town in the Selwyn District of the South Island of New Zealand. It is 35 kilometres west of Christchurch and has a population of 3,590 as of June 2025.

Darfield is the main town between Christchurch and the West Coast region. It is often called "The township under the nor'west arch" in reference to a characteristic weather phenomenon that often creates an arch of cloud in an otherwise clear sky to the west of the township. This is caused by the condensation of water particles channelled upwards over the Southern Alps.

Darfield lies in the Malvern district's arable and pastoral farming area. It is a gateway to the scenic Waimakariri and Rakaia rivers and the Southern Alps, and is also a popular lift-off place for hot air ballooning.

Darfield is located around the former junction of the railway lines coming from Christchurch and going to Whitecliffs (where coal was mined), and Springfield, and on to the West Coast.

== History ==
Darfield was first known as White Cliffs Junction, but was then renamed in 1879 to Horndon Junction. This name was changed again to avoid confusion with Hornby [railway] Junction (close by in Christchurch).

Darfield acquired its name from John Jebson, who named it after the village in Yorkshire, England. The name refers to a field frequented by deer.

A stone mill for grinding flour was built in 1887. It was powered by the Selwyn County Council's water race.

=== 2000s–present ===
A magnitude 7.1 earthquake occurred near Darfield at 4:35 am on 4 September 2010, causing widespread damage to both the town and to surrounding areas, including the city of Christchurch.

Fonterra invested $500 million in a milk processing plant, which was opened in 2013 in Darfield. This includes the world's largest dryer, which is used in the process to make instant whole milk powder.

== Climate ==
Located on the Canterbury Plains at an altitude of 193 m (633 ft) above sea level, the Köppen-Geiger climate classification for Darfield is Cfb (Oceanic). On several days a year, Darfield is subject to the nor'west Foehn wind, which is very dry and has the capability to raise the temperature by several degrees per hour. On the contrary, the town is also susceptible to cold blasts from the Southern Ocean, especially during winter, when a southerly wind blows. The average annual temperature in Darfield is 11.9 °C (53 °F). The highest recorded temperature is 40.7 °C (105 °F), set on 7 February 1973, while the lowest recorded temperature is −11.8 °C (11 °F), set on 7 June 2012. The highest minimum temperature is 25.7 °C (78 °F), set on 6 February 2011, while the lowest maximum temperature is 0.6 °C (33 °F), set on 12 July 2017. On average every year Darfield can expect to see 45 days exceeding 25 °C (77 °F) and 8 days exceeding 30 °C (86 °F) while seeing on average 34 nights that drop below 0 °C (32 °F).

Climate data for Darfield (1991–2020 normals, extremes 1939–2015)
Month	Jan	Feb	Mar	Apr	May	Jun	Jul	Aug	Sep	Oct	Nov	Dec	Year
Record high °C (°F)	38.4 (101.1)	40.7 (105.3)	37.6 (99.7)	28.9 (84.0)	27.2 (81.0)	22.3 (72.1)	21.0 (69.8)	23.3 (73.9)	27.8 (82.0)	30.0 (86.0)	32.1 (89.8)	36.5 (97.7)	40.7 (105.3)
Mean daily maximum °C (°F)	23.6 (74.5)	23.4 (74.1)	21.4 (70.5)	17.8 (64.0)	14.6 (58.3)	11.1 (52.0)	10.8 (51.4)	12.9 (55.2)	15.4 (59.7)	17.5 (63.5)	19.6 (67.3)	21.9 (71.4)	17.5 (63.5)
Daily mean °C (°F)	17.3 (63.1)	17.1 (62.8)	15.3 (59.5)	12.3 (54.1)	9.6 (49.3)	6.7 (44.1)	6.2 (43.2)	7.7 (45.9)	9.8 (49.6)	11.6 (52.9)	13.4 (56.1)	15.7 (60.3)	11.9 (53.4)
Mean daily minimum °C (°F)	10.9 (51.6)	10.7 (51.3)	9.1 (48.4)	6.8 (44.2)	4.6 (40.3)	2.2 (36.0)	1.6 (34.9)	2.6 (36.7)	4.2 (39.6)	5.7 (42.3)	7.1 (44.8)	9.5 (49.1)	6.3 (43.3)
Record low °C (°F)	0.6 (33.1)	−0.4 (31.3)	−1.0 (30.2)	−2.6 (27.3)	−5.3 (22.5)	−11.8 (10.8)	−9.0 (15.8)	−6.1 (21.0)	−4.8 (23.4)	−3.5 (25.7)	−2.6 (27.3)	0.1 (32.2)	−11.8 (10.8)
Average rainfall mm (inches)	55.2 (2.17)	54.2 (2.13)	58.1 (2.29)	62.7 (2.47)	65.9 (2.59)	82.9 (3.26)	69.6 (2.74)	74.1 (2.92)	56.1 (2.21)	63.9 (2.52)	57.4 (2.26)	69.3 (2.73)	769.4 (30.29)
Source: NIWA

== Demographics ==
Darfield is described by Stats NZ as a small urban area, and covers 17.58 km^{2} (6.79 sq mi). It had an estimated population of 3,590 as of June 2025, with a population density of 204 people per km^{2}.

Historical population
Year	Pop.	±% p.a.
1971	830	—
2006	1,974	+2.51%
2013	2,451	+3.14%
2018	2,784	+2.58%
2023	3,249	+3.14%
The 2006 population is for a smaller area of 15.14 km^{2}. The area in 1971 is not specified. Source:

Darfield had a population of 3,249 in the 2023 New Zealand census, an increase of 465 people (16.7%) since the 2018 census, and an increase of 798 people (32.6%) since the 2013 census. There were 1,608 males, 1,626 females, and 12 people of other genders in 1,236 dwellings. 1.8% of people identified as LGBTIQ+. The median age was 42.1 years (compared with 38.1 years nationally). There were 630 people (19.4%) aged under 15 years, 459 (14.1%) aged 15 to 29, 1,524 (46.9%) aged 30 to 64, and 633 (19.5%) aged 65 or older.

People could identify as more than one ethnicity. The results were 93.8% European (Pākehā); 7.6% Māori; 2.4% Pasifika; 2.1% Asian; 0.8% Middle Eastern, Latin American and African New Zealanders (MELAA); and 3.9% other, which includes people giving their ethnicity as "New Zealander". English was spoken by 97.7%, Māori by 1.1%, Samoan by 0.5%, and other languages by 5.4%. No language could be spoken by 1.8% (e.g. too young to talk). New Zealand Sign Language was known by 0.6%. The percentage of people born overseas was 16.9, compared with 28.8% nationally.

Religious affiliations were 31.7% Christian, 0.2% Hindu, 0.2% Islam, 0.1% Buddhist, 0.3% New Age, and 0.8% other religions. People who answered that they had no religion were 59.6%, and 7.1% of people did not answer the census question.

Of those at least 15 years old, 516 (19.7%) people had a bachelor's or higher degree, 1,548 (59.1%) had a post-high school certificate or diploma, and 549 (21.0%) people exclusively held high school qualifications. The median income was $49,500, compared with $41,500 nationally. 336 people (12.8%) earned over $100,000 compared to 12.1% nationally. The employment status of those at least 15 was 1,428 (54.5%) full-time, 372 (14.2%) part-time, and 30 (1.1%) unemployed.

== Education ==
Darfield has numerous kindergartens.

Darfield Primary School caters for years 1 to 6. It has 310 students. It opened in 1883 with a total of 18 students attending. By 1902 the school had two teachers and 93 students on the school roll.

Darfield High School is Darfield's intermediate/high school, catering for years 7 to 13. It has 815 students. The school was established in 1951 as a secondary school, and expanded to cover intermediate students in 1978.

Both schools are coeducational. Rolls are as of July 2026.

== Industry ==
Many industries are present in Darfield, including brick-making, seed cleaning, and a Fonterra factory, which processes milk powder. The factory has a series of railway sidings and a container loading centre.

== Services ==
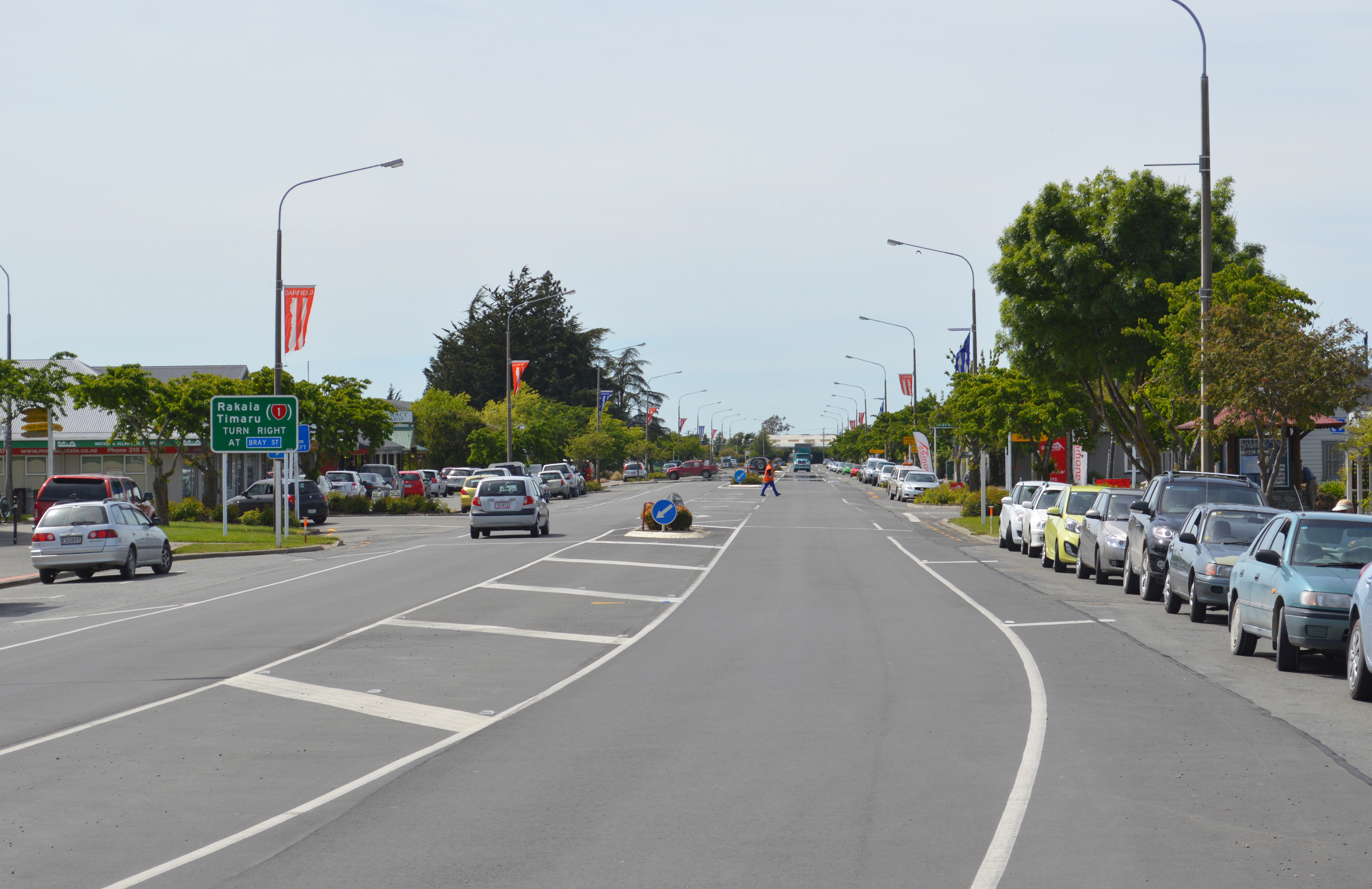
SH73/South Terrace, October 2013

Darfield has a shopping precinct along the main street, including a Four Square supermarket. The town also has many churches, most notably St Joseph's Catholic Church and Trinity Church (Anglican, Methodist, Presbyterian). Darfield has two rest homes.

Darfield is also has police, fire and ambulance stations, as well as a medical centre and a hospital.

Selwyn is not connected to a district wide sewage scheme. This necessitates all homes to have their own septic tanks.

=== Recreation ===
Darfield has a domain, which includes duck ponds and the community centre. Football and rugby fields, tennis courts and a Scouts building are also located in the domain.

Westview Park is located in between the Midland railway line and State Highway 73 and to the west of Four Square Darfield. It boasts attractions such as the Whitecliffs Branch historical site and a skatepark.

McHughs Forest Park is located northwest of Darfield. It was planted in 1893 to provide timber for mid Canterbury. It contains a mix of Douglas Fir, Pinus Radiata, Macrocarpa, Larch, Spruce and other exotic species. There are a series of walking tracks within the forest.

== Transport ==
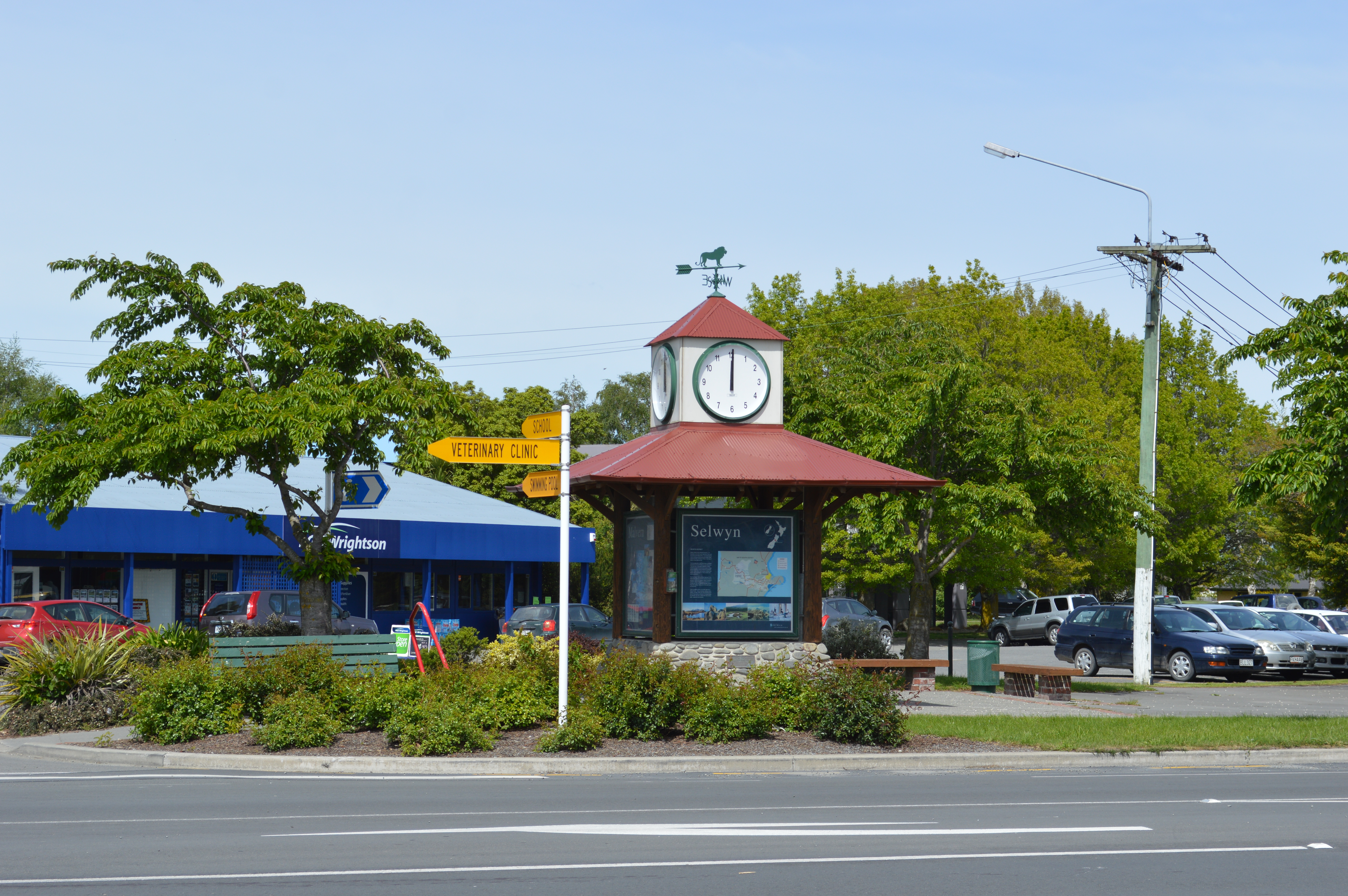
Clock at Darfield, October 2013

=== Bus ===
Darfield is serviced with the 86 bus route, a morning and evening express route that connects the town with Central Christchurch, via Kirwee, West Melton and Yaldhurst.

=== Rail ===
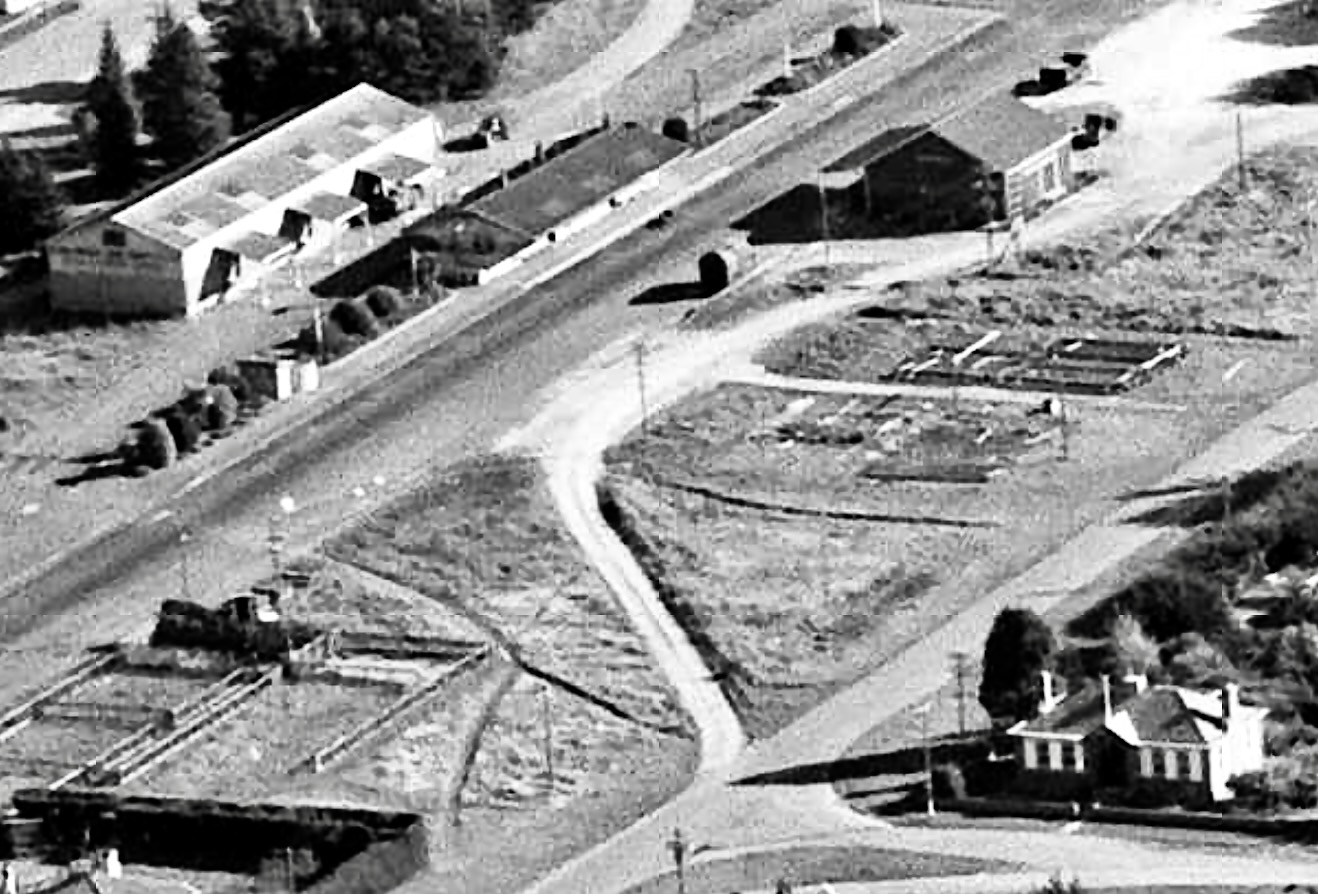
Darfield railway station and Methven County Council office in 1957

Darfield is served by the Midland railway line. The TranzAlpine train stops twice daily (request only); en route to the West Coast and on its return trip back to Christchurch.

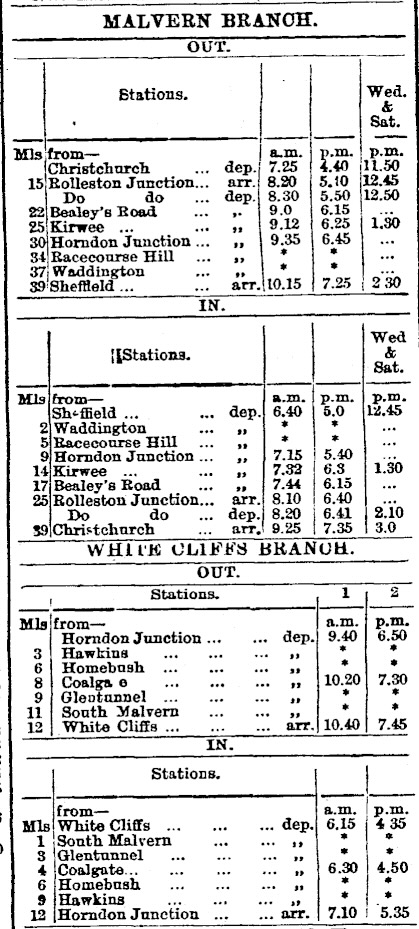
1878 Malvern and White Cliffs timetable

The 24 mi (39 km) of railway from Rolleston Junction to Malvern (Sheffield) opened without ceremony on 1 December 1874, with a train to Christchurch each morning and a return each evening. The line was known as the Malvern Branch and the station's name was changed from White Cliffs Junction (junction for the Whitecliffs Branch, which opened on 3 November 1875) to Horndon Junction on 1 August 1876 and to Darfield Junction on 1 October 1879. By 1882 it had 3 rooms, a platform, cart approach, 40 ft (12 m) x 40 ft (12 m) goods shed, a water tank, coalyard, stationmaster's house, urinals, a passing loop for 30 wagons (39 by 1886) and platelayers' cottages. Cattle yards were added in 1883 and sheep yards and a weighbridge by 1886. At 2.30am on 28 September 1887 the station burnt down and was replaced the next month by station buildings from Aylesbury. In 1909 improvements were made and in September 1915 lighting was added. A 1920s postcard showed six staff, but, on 14 February 1925, the Post Office was moved from the station. In 1944 the old weighbridge building was moved to Queen Street, Westport, as a shelter. The Whitecliffs Branch closed on 31 March 1962 and between 1988 and March 1990 Darfield's station building and goods shed were removed.

=== Road ===
Darfield is served by State Highway 73 (Great Alpine Highway), connecting Christchurch with the West Coast region and State Highway 77, connecting Darfield with Ashburton via Methven, the Rakaia Gorge and Glentunnel.

== Notable people ==
- Sir Allan Wright (29 March 1929), President of Federated Farmers and first chancellor of Lincoln University.
- Geoff Wright (29 March 1929), New Zealand cricketer
- John Wright (5 July 1954), New Zealand cricketer and former coach of the Indian national cricket team
- Henry Shipley (10 May 10 1996), New Zealand cricketer
- Brian Connell (23 April 1956), politician
- Mary Clinton (8 May 1960), New Zealand field hockey player
- James Te Huna (29 September 1981), first New Zealander to enter the UFC, 2010 (Ultimate Fighting Championships)

== Gallery ==
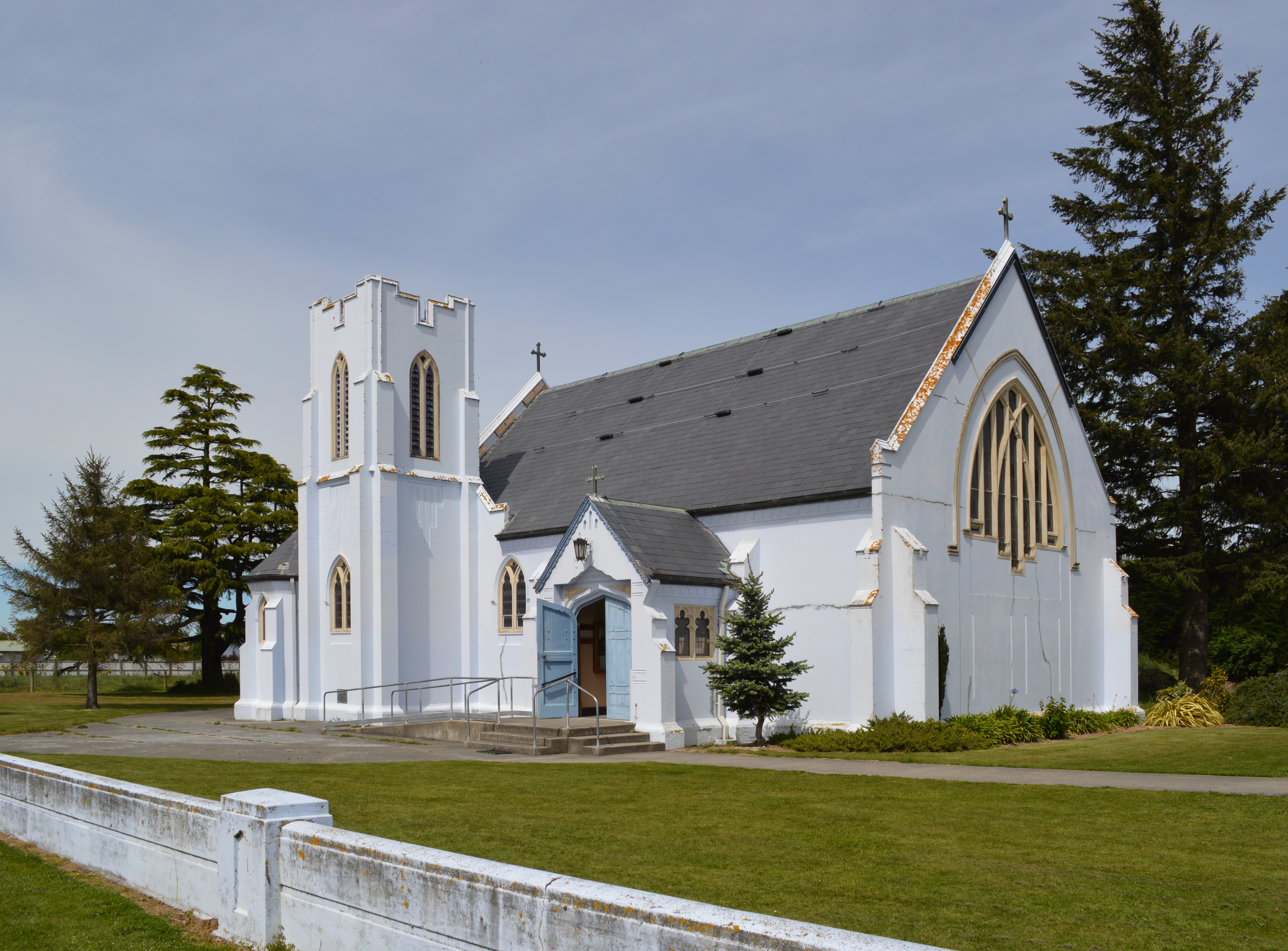
St Joseph's Catholic Church, October 2013

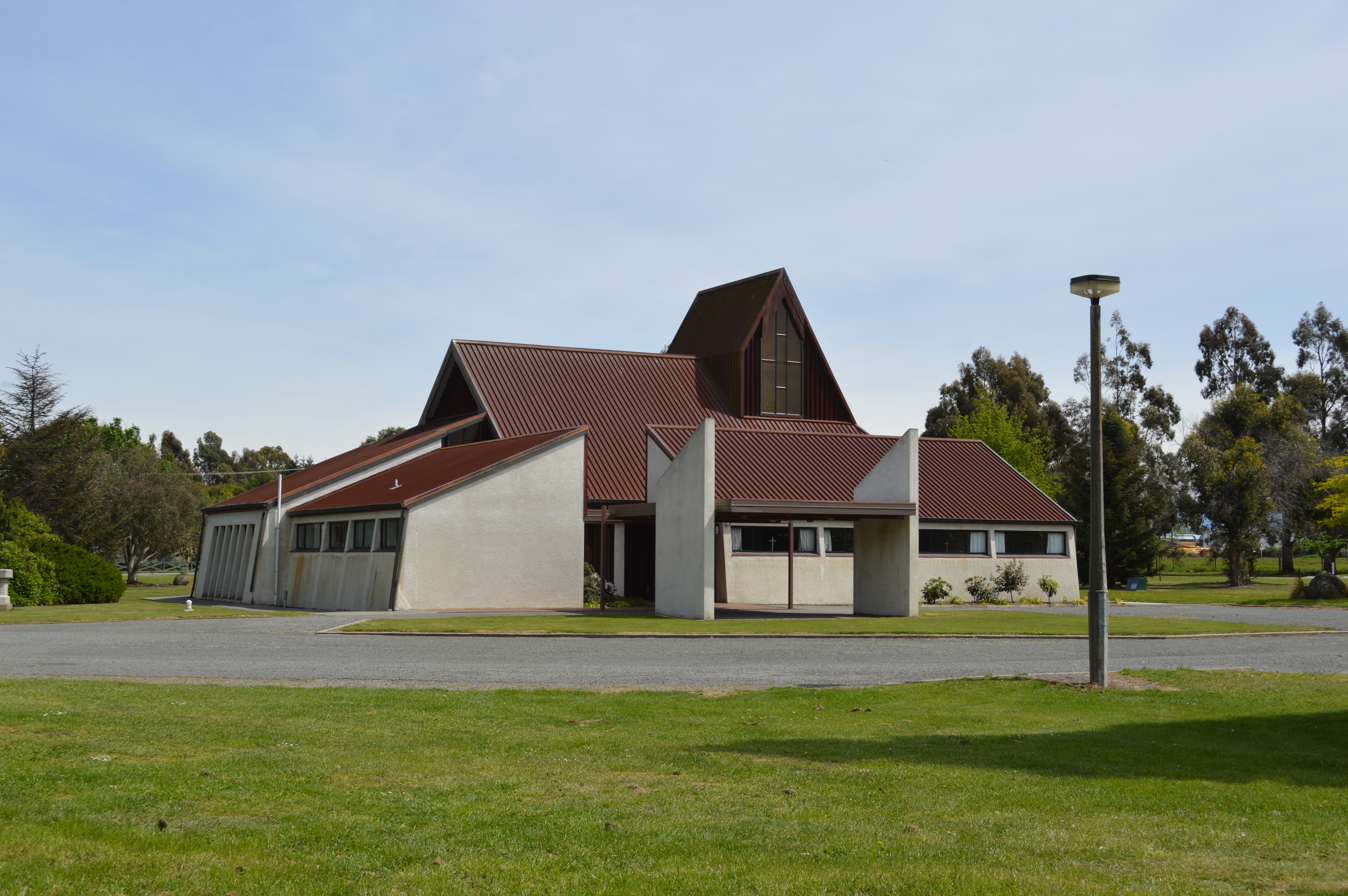
Trinity Church, October 2013

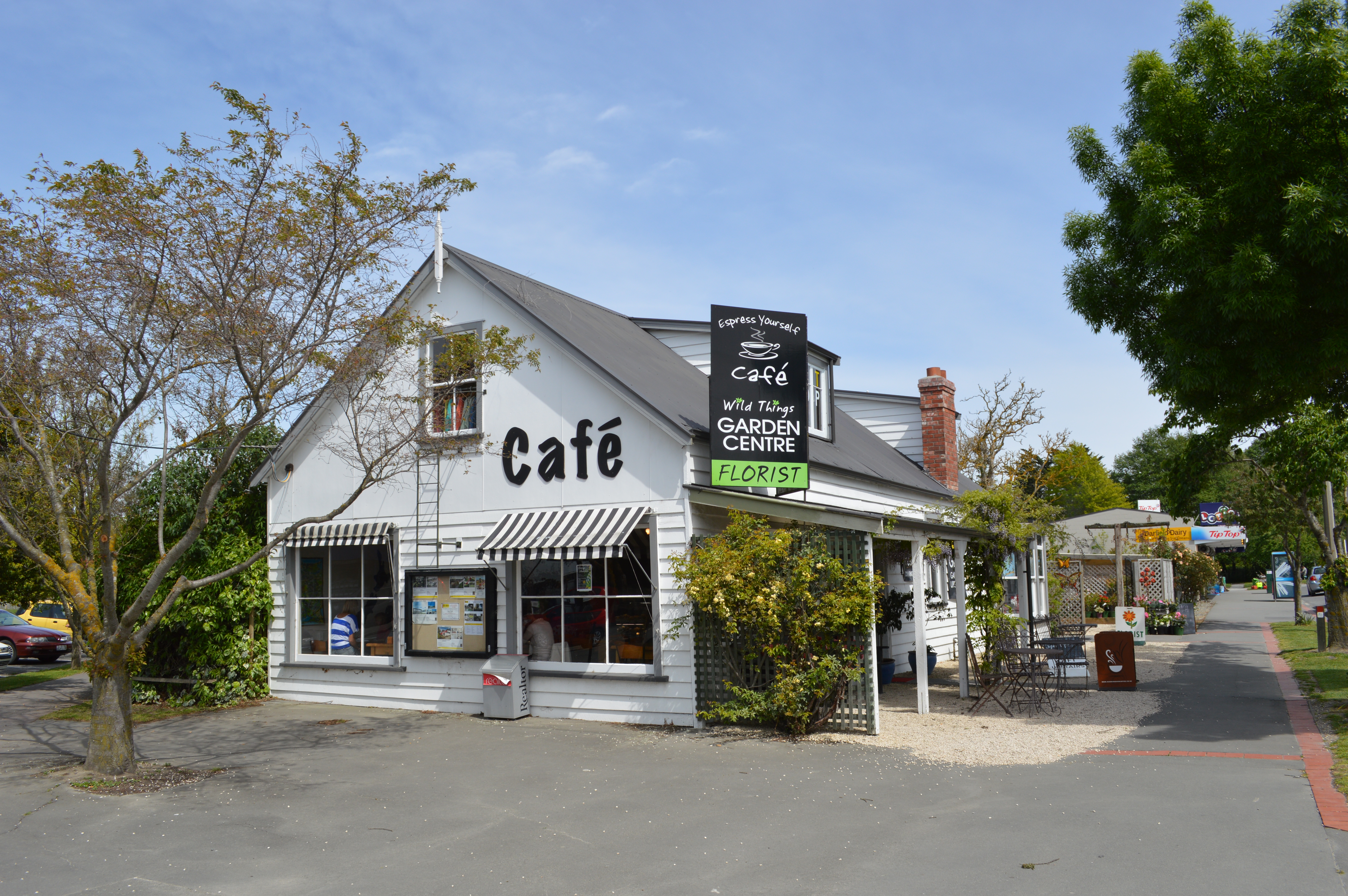
Cafe in central Darfield, October 2013

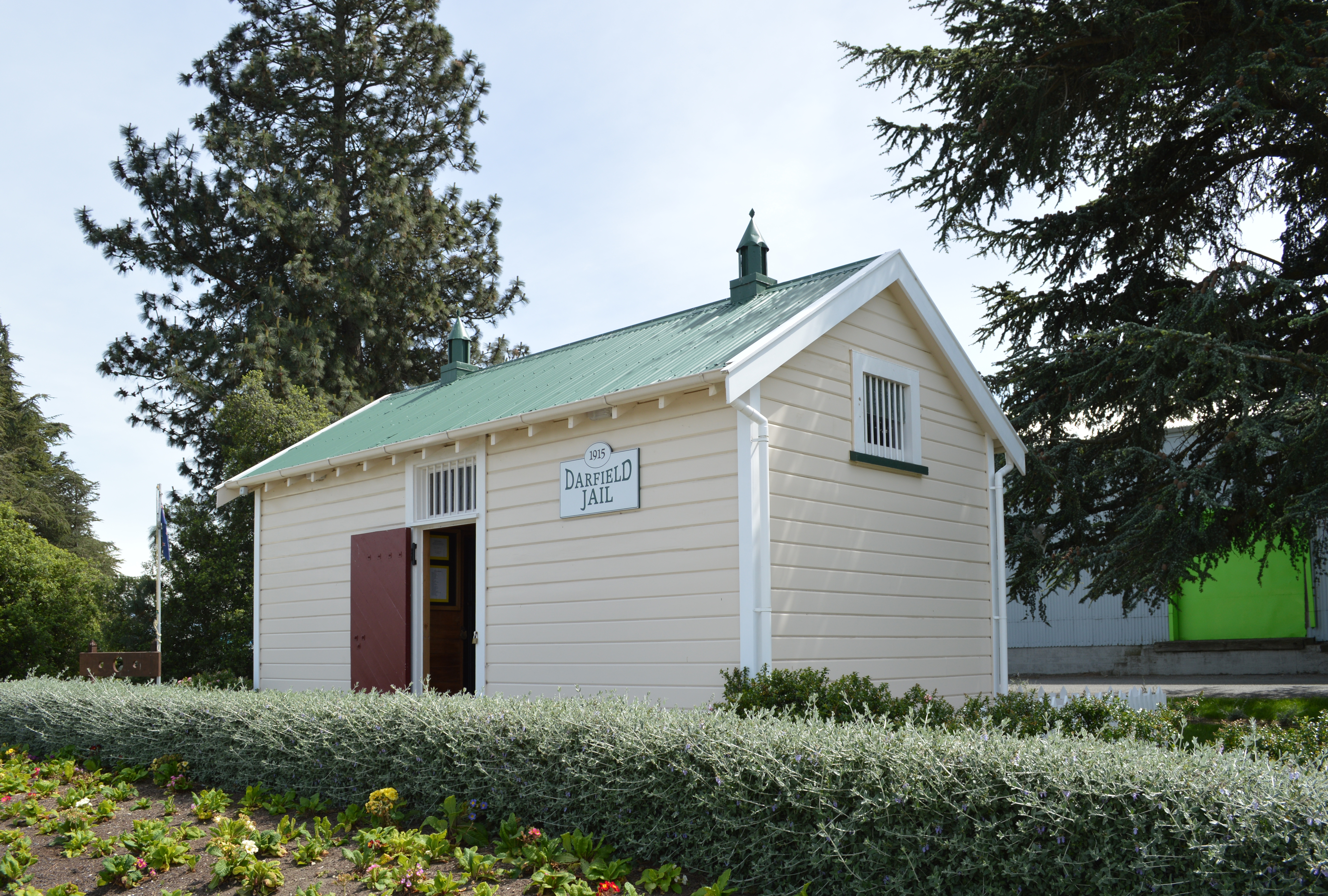
Historic jail dating 1915, October 2013

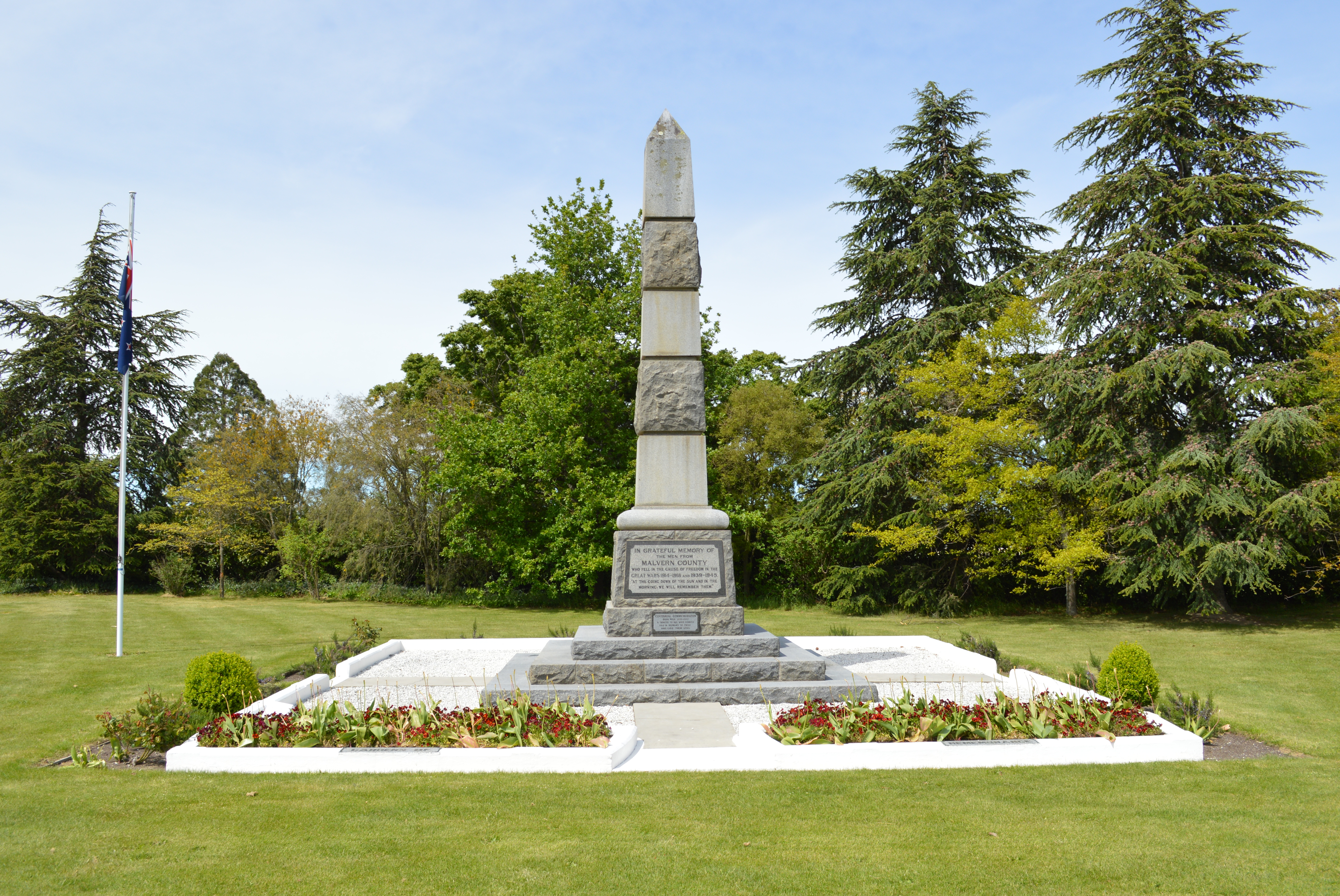
Darfield War Memorial, located next to Trinity Church, October 2013
