= Whitecliffs =

Settlement in Canterbury, New Zealand

- Village
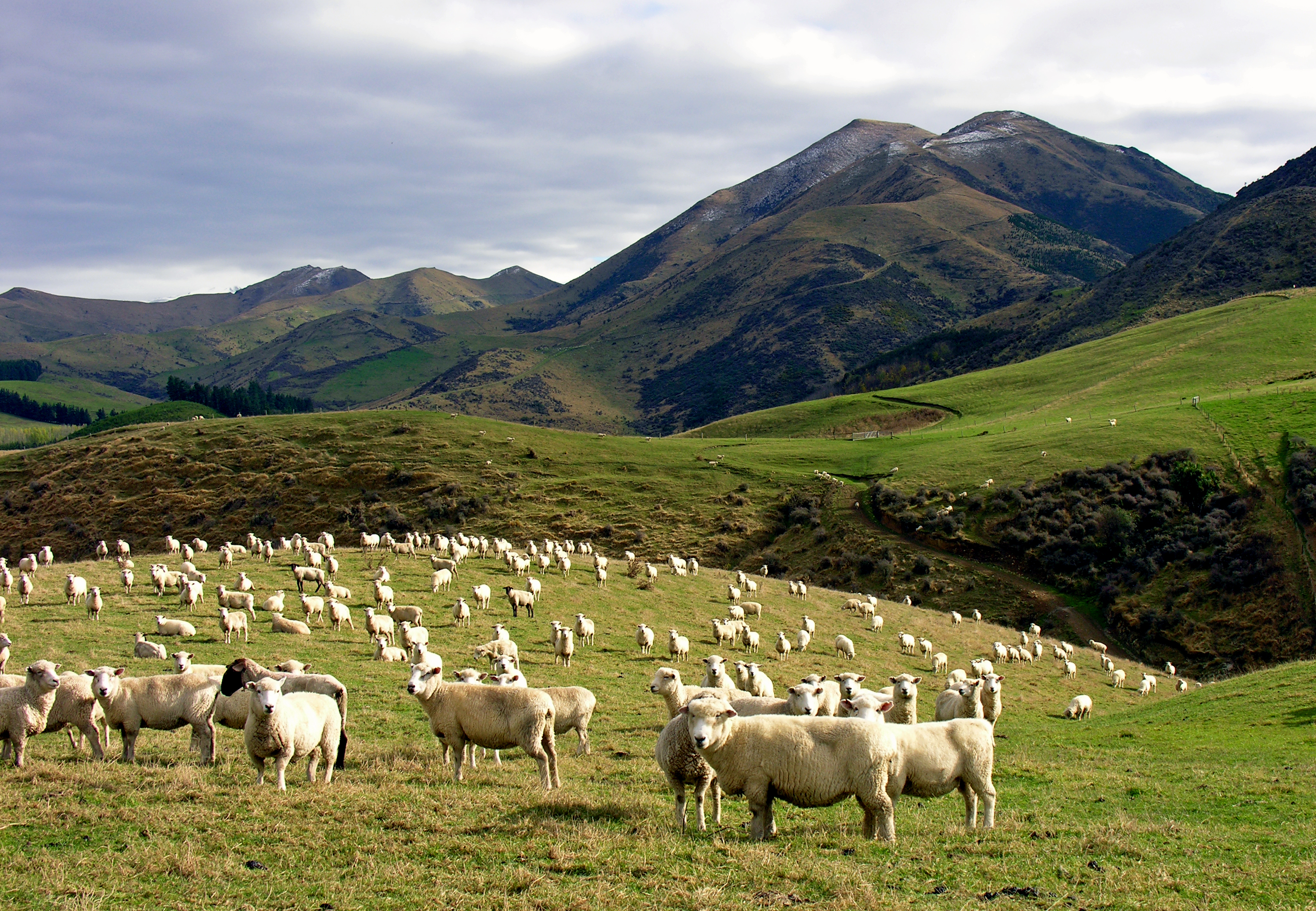
- Countryside surrounding Whitecliffs
- Interactive map of Whitecliffs
- Country: New Zealand
- Region: Canterbury
- Territorial authority: Selwyn District
- Ward: Malvern
- Community: Malvern
- Electorates: Selwyn; Te Tai Tonga (Māori)

Government
  - Territorial authority: Selwyn District Council
  - Regional council: Environment Canterbury
  - Mayor of Selwyn: Lydia Gliddon
  - Selwyn MP: Nicola Grigg
  - Te Tai Tonga MP: Tākuta Ferris

Area
  - Total: 1.24 km^{2} (0.48 sq mi)
- Elevation: 288 m (945 ft)

Population (June 2025)
  - Total: 220
  - Density: 180/km^{2} (460/sq mi)
- Time zone: UTC+12 (New Zealand Standard Time)
  - Summer (DST): UTC+13 (New Zealand Daylight Time)
- Postcode: 7673
- Area code: 03

Whitecliffs is a village located in the Selwyn District of the Canterbury region of New Zealand's South Island. It has also been known as South Malvern (Sheffield was formerly known as Malvern), and the name of Whitecliffs comes from terrace cliffs above the Selwyn River / Waikirikiri.

== Demographics ==
Malvern Hills-Whitecliffs is described by Stats NZ as a rural settlement, and covers 1.24 km^{2} (0.48 sq mi). It had an estimated population of 220 as of June 2025, with a population density of 293 people per km^{2}. It is part of the Glentunnel statistical area.

Historical population
Year	Pop.	±% p.a.
2006	129	—
2013	153	+2.47%
2018	174	+2.61%
2023	210	+3.83%

Malvern Hills-Whitecliffs had a population of 210 in the 2023 New Zealand census, an increase of 36 people (20.7%) since the 2018 census, and an increase of 57 people (37.3%) since the 2013 census. There were 102 males, 108 females, and 3 people of other genders in 90 dwellings. 1.4% of people identified as LGBTIQ+. The median age was 47.4 years (compared with 38.1 years nationally). There were 36 people (17.1%) aged under 15 years, 18 (8.6%) aged 15 to 29, 108 (51.4%) aged 30 to 64, and 48 (22.9%) aged 65 or older.

People could identify as more than one ethnicity. The results were 97.1% European (Pākehā); 7.1% Māori; 1.4% Asian; 1.4% Middle Eastern, Latin American and African New Zealanders (MELAA); and 2.9% other, which includes people giving their ethnicity as "New Zealander". English was spoken by 98.6%, Māori by 1.4%, and other languages by 8.6%. No language could be spoken by 1.4% (e.g. too young to talk). The percentage of people born overseas was 24.3, compared with 28.8% nationally.

Religious affiliations were 24.3% Christian, 1.4% Māori religious beliefs, and 1.4% New Age. People who answered that they had no religion were 64.3%, and 10.0% of people did not answer the census question.

Of those at least 15 years old, 39 (22.4%) people had a bachelor's or higher degree, 99 (56.9%) had a post-high school certificate or diploma, and 42 (24.1%) people exclusively held high school qualifications. The median income was $35,400, compared with $41,500 nationally. 12 people (6.9%) earned over $100,000 compared to 12.1% nationally. The employment status of those at least 15 was 81 (46.6%) full-time, 30 (17.2%) part-time, and 3 (1.7%) unemployed.

== Industry ==
The town was once significantly larger and home to industrial activity such as pottery and brick-making, and coal and sand mining took place nearby. No industry takes place anymore.

== Transport ==
The town's economic importance was significant enough for the Whitecliffs Branch, a branch line railway from the Midland Line, to be built to the town. It opened on 3 November 1875. Passenger services ceased on 13 March 1949, and due to declining freight, the line was closed entirely on 31 March 1962. The railway's engine shed still stands in the town.
