= Tawera County =

Former county of New Zealand

Coordinates: 43°29′18″S 172°06′53″E

- County of New Zealand
- 1910–1967
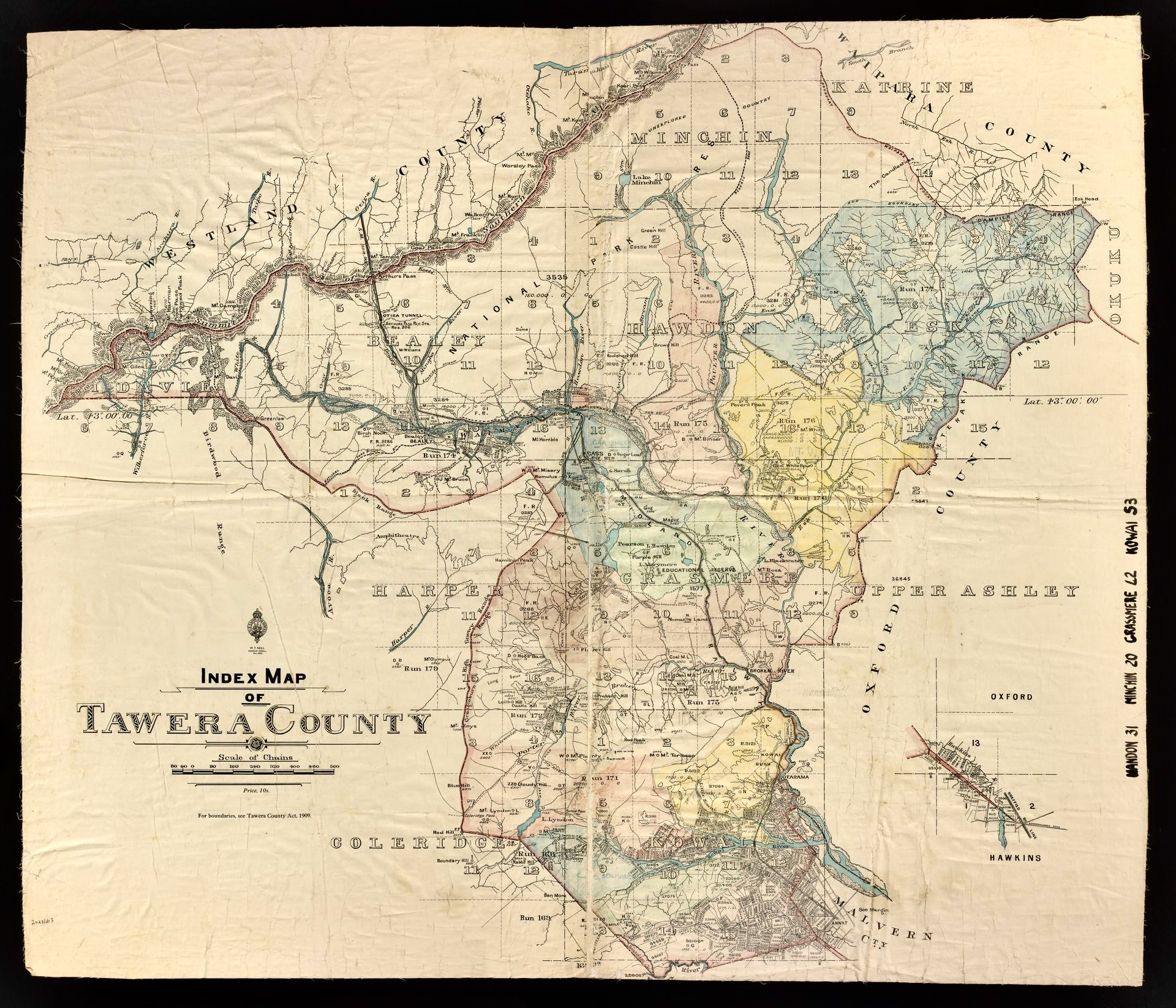
- Tawera County map 1922
- Capital: Springfield
- History
  - Established: 1910
  - Disestablished: 1967
- Today part of: Selwyn District

Tawera County was one of the counties of New Zealand in the South Island. It was formed in 1910 when Selwyn County was sub-divided into 9 smaller counties, and comprised the areas covered by Selwyn County's Malvern and Upper Waimakariri Road Boards. The county was made up of three ridings: Cass with two councillors; Kowai Bush (two councillors); and Springfield (three councillors). In 1967, Tawera County was merged into Malvern County. As part of the 1989 local government reforms, Ellesmere, Malvern and part of Paparua Counties merged to form Selwyn District.

The western county boundary was the main divide between Westland and Canterbury, from Clarke's Pass in the south to Harper Pass in the north. The north-eastern and eastern boundary followed the watershed to Esk Head, then southwest to the Waimakariri River and along that river, and Auchenflower Road to the Selwyn River. The southern boundary ran by Lake Lyndon, Red Hill, Mount Enys and the summits of the Craigieburn and Black ranges to Clarke's Pass.

Most of Tawera County was taken up by settlers in the early 1850s.

The seat of Tawera County was at Springfield, in the former Malvern Road Board's offices.

== See also ==
- List of former territorial authorities in New Zealand § Counties
