= Malvern County =

Former county of New Zealand

Coordinates: 43°29′18″S 172°06′53″E

- County of New Zealand
- 1911–1989
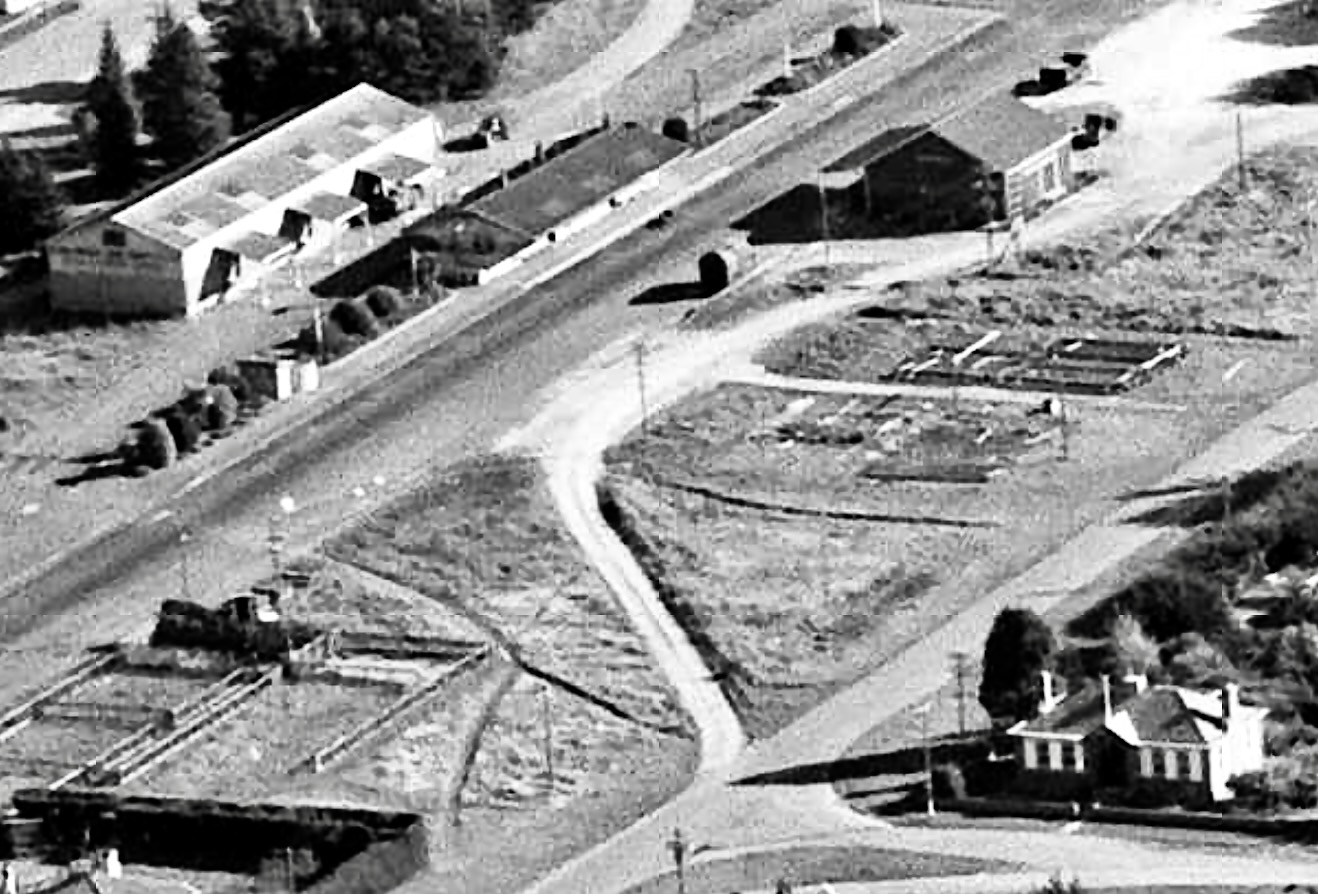
- Darfield railway station and Methven County Council office in 1957
- Capital: Darfield
- History
  - Established: 1911
  - Disestablished: 1989
- Today part of: Selwyn District

Malvern County was one of the counties of New Zealand on the South Island.

Malvern County was formed in 1911 with Selwyn County's Courtenay, South Malvern and East Malvern Road Boards. The county was made up of 3 ridings, Courtney with 6 councillors, Homebush 2 and Sheffield 1. In 1912 the West Melton side of Courtney Riding was transferred to Paparua County.

Selwyn and Malvern Counties merged in 1963 and Tawera County was added in 1967. In October 1989, Ellesmere, Malvern and part of Paparua Counties merged to form Selwyn District Council.

The county lay between the Waimakariri and Selwyn/Waikirikiri Rivers and included Sheffield, Darfield, Courtenay, Kirwee, Aylesbury, Norwood, Greendale, Charing Cross, Coalgate, Glentunnel and Whitecliffs. It first used Darfield Saleyards building, but its tendered and built its own brick offices and chambers at 20 North Terrace, Darfield in 1912 and moved into them in 1913, now listed as a heritage building. New offices at Darfield were opened in 1968.

== See also ==
- List of former territorial authorities in New Zealand § Counties
