= St Andrew's of the Glen, Glentunnel =

Coordinates: 43.481035°S 171.932116°E

St Andrew's of the Glen
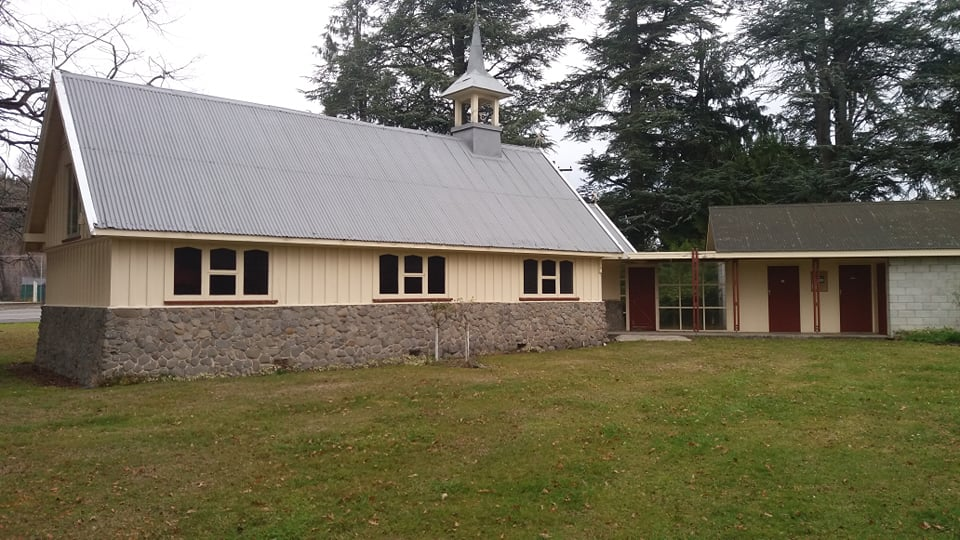
- St Andrew's of the Glen, July 2020
- St Andrew's of the Glen
- Location: Glentunnel
- Address: 1 Elizabeth Street, Glentunnel
- Country: New Zealand
- Denomination: Anglican; Methodist; Presbyterian

History
- Former name: St Andrew's Presbyterian Church
- Status: Church
- Events: 2010 Canterbury earthquake

Architecture
- Heritage designation: Selwyn District Council heritage-listed
- Style: Arts and Crafts Gothic Revival
- Years built: 1914–1915
- Completed: 1915
- Closed: 2010–2026

Specifications
- Capacity: 60
- Materials: Stone

St Andrew's of the Glen, previously known as St Andrew's Presbyterian Church is a multi-denominational Anglican, Methodist, and Presbyterian church located in Glentunnel, New Zealand.

== History ==
In 1877, a meeting was held in the road board office in Sheffield to establish regular Presbyterian services in South Malvern. Presbyterian services then began in and around South Malvern (Sheffield, Glentunnel, Greendale, and Hororata) by the Rev. C. Fraser, of St Andrew's Church, Christchurch. Efforts were then made to have a permanent minister for the area.

The first Presbyterian service to be recorded in South Malvern was at Coalgate in February 1878, when Rev. Fraser preached in a small building, approximately 10 ft by 14 ft. On 23 December 1878, the Rev. F. Hauxwell was ordained to the Malvern area and held services in the road board office, until his departure for Papanui, Christchurch. Church services took place at Glentunnel School regularly, alongside Methodists up until 1900.

The section on which the church now stands was used as a camping ground for the wool wagons from Snowdon sheep station, near Windwhistle. This section was donated donated by the Deans family of Homebush, and construction was completed in 1915, with the church opening debt-free.

=== 2010 Canterbury earthquake ===
The church was closed following the 2010 Canterbury earthquake. The first engineering report commissioned by the Presbyterian Church came back inconclusive about the structural integrity of the church. Local volunteers of the church then approached builders, who were also unsure about the level of work needed to reinstate the church. This prevented the church from reopening to the public.

A second application was made to the Selwyn District Council Heritage Protection Fund for another engineering assessment. The assessment concluded that the church was not earthquake-prone. On 27 September 2026, the first church service to occur since the earthquakes took place.

The Gallipoli oak tree, December 2023

== Heritage features ==
=== Saint Paul and Saint Peter paintings ===
The church holds a collection of two original paintings by Susan Wilson, of whom, two of her brothers were ministers in the Malvern area.The paintings depict St Paul and St Andrew, and reflects the style of Francisco de Zurbaran, whose work influenced Wilson.

=== Stained-glass windows ===
The church is one of a few in New Zealand to have the Royal New Zealand Air Force (RNZAF) insignia in its stained-glass memorial window.

=== Gallipoli Oak ===
A Gallipoli Oak (Quercus cerris) is listed in the Selwyn District Council's district plan. As of 2018, it has a registered height of 31.3 m (103 ft) and is east of the church, behind the sanctuary-end of the church.
