= Selwyn County =

Selwyn County may refer to:

- Selwyn County, New South Wales, Australia
- Selwyn County, New Zealand
