= Glentunnel =

Settlement in Canterbury, New Zealand

- Village
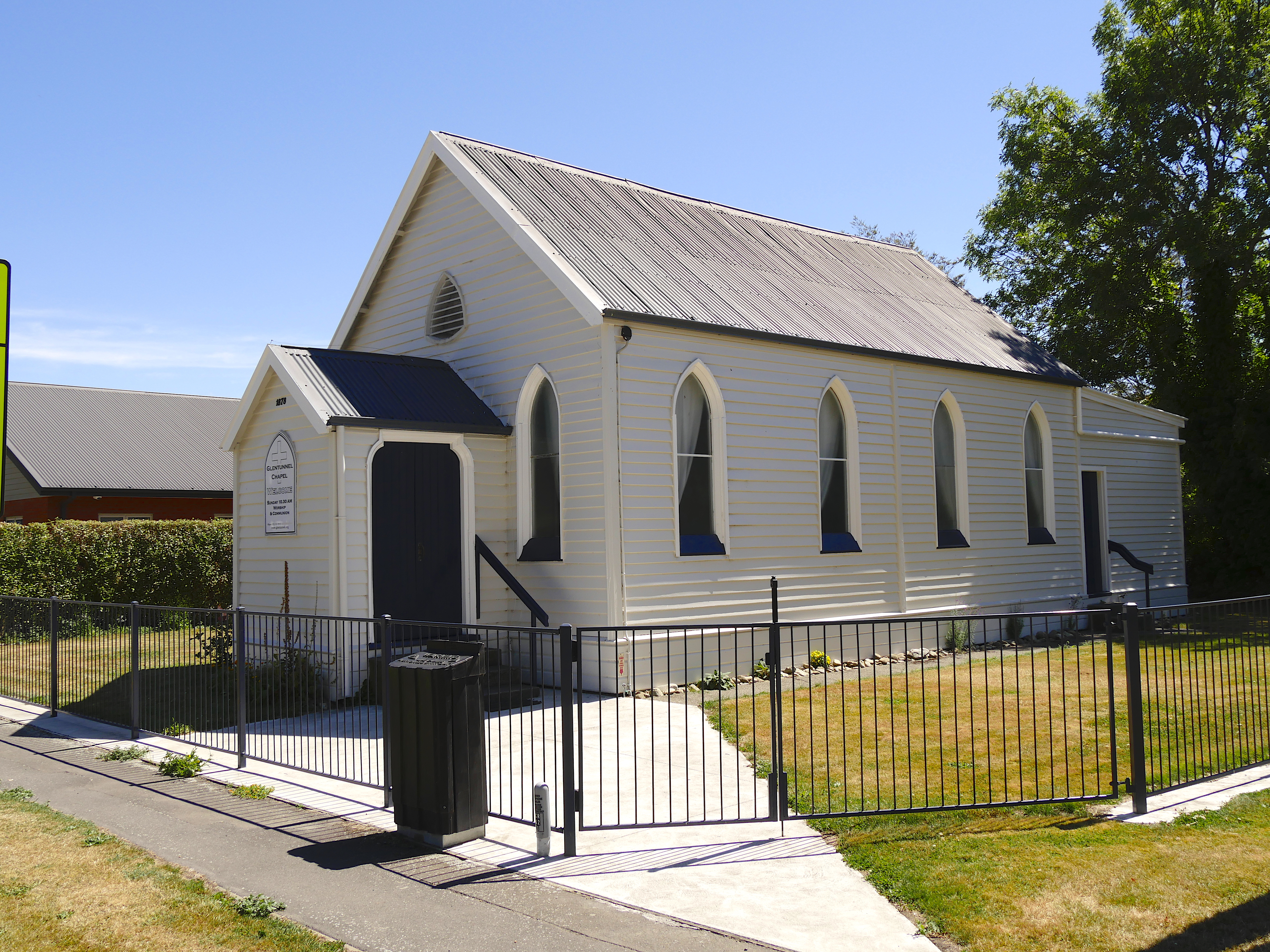
- Glentunnel Chapel, February 2017
- Interactive map of Glentunnel
- Coordinates: 43°29′S 171°56′E
- Country: New Zealand
- Region: Canterbury
- Territorial authority: Selwyn District
- Ward: Malvern
- Community: Malvern
- Electorates: Selwyn; Te Tai Tonga (Māori)

Government
  - Territorial authority: Selwyn District Council
  - Regional council: Environment Canterbury
  - Mayor of Selwyn: Lydia Gliddon
  - Selwyn MP: Nicola Grigg
  - Te Tai Tonga MP: Mananui Ramsden

Area
  - Total: 0.21 km^{2} (0.081 sq mi)
- Elevation: 260 m (850 ft)

Population (June 2025)
  - Total: 170
  - Density: 810/km^{2} (2,100/sq mi)
- Time zone: UTC+12 (New Zealand Standard Time)
  - Summer (DST): UTC+13 (New Zealand Daylight Time)
- Postcode: 7673
- Area code: 03

Glentunnel (known as Surveyors Gully until 1875) is a village located in the Selwyn District of the Canterbury region of New Zealand's South Island.

It has a close historical association with coal, clay and sand mines of the Malvern area. Originally named ‘Surveyors Gully’, Glentunnel, derived from the tramway tunnel in the glen that gave access to the Homebush coal mine. Coal was discovered in 1871, along with deposits of fine clay, which lead to the establishment of a brick, tile and pottery works that survived until the 1980s.

It is located on State Highway 77/Inland Scenic Route 72, and is 14.5 kilometres (9.0 mi) west from Darfield and 50 kilometres (31 mi) west of Christchurch.

== History ==
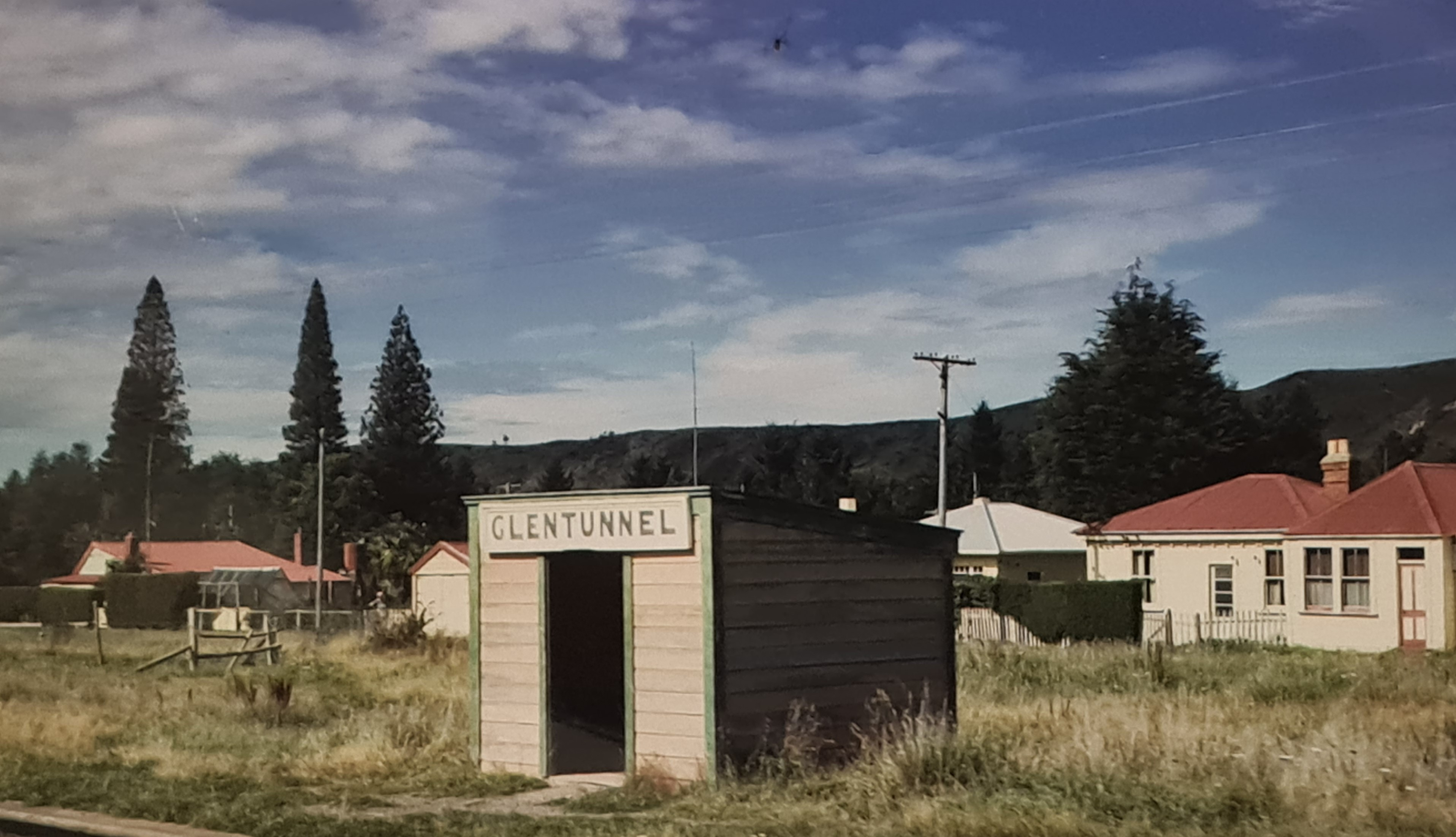
Glentunnel Railway Station

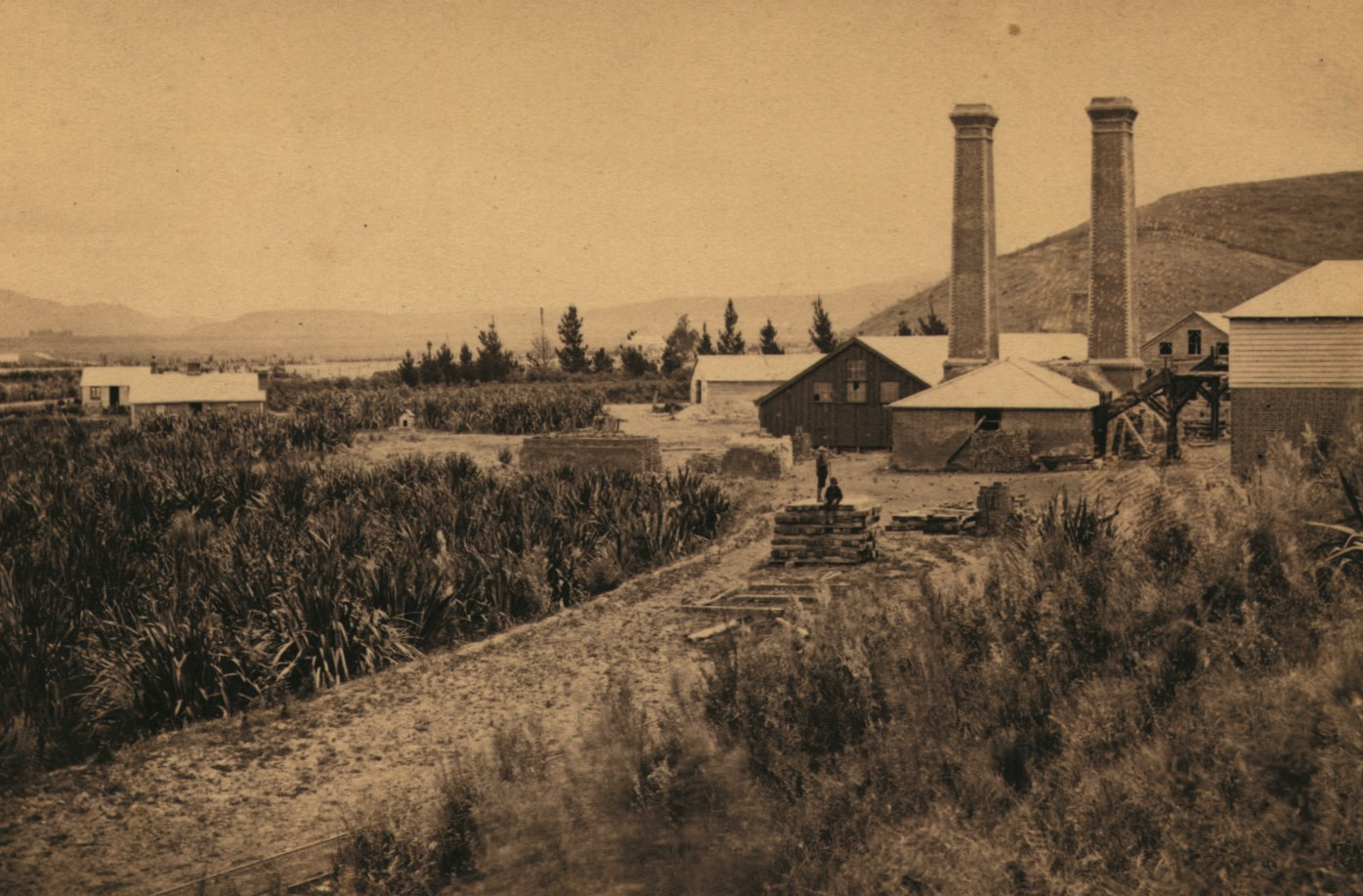
Glentunnel Brickworks, c. 1900s

=== 1800s–2000s ===
Glentunnel was served by the Whitecliffs Branch, a branch line railway, from the line's opening on 3 November 1875 through to its closure on 31 March 1962. However, the station was not open until 22 April 1876.

In February 1876, the 1600hrs train to Christchurch had left Whitecliffs when an accident occurred at a sharp bend above the Selwyn Rapids. The locomotive and guard's van left the track, causing it to roll down the steep embankment. The engine driver was unharmed, an inspector was slightly injured. The fireman suffered serious injuries, resulting in long-term ill health, where he eventually died. This section of road is now known to locals as "Breakneck Corner".

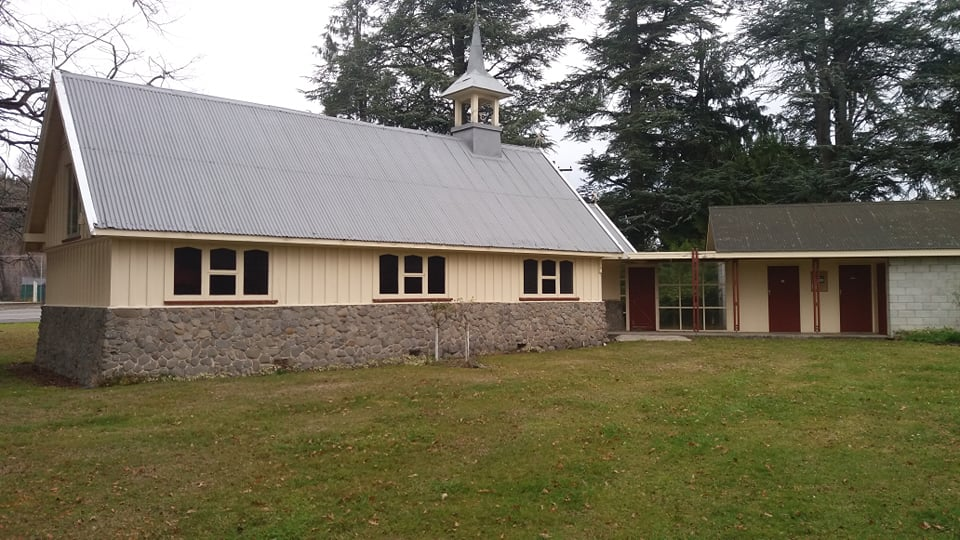
St Andrew's of the Glen

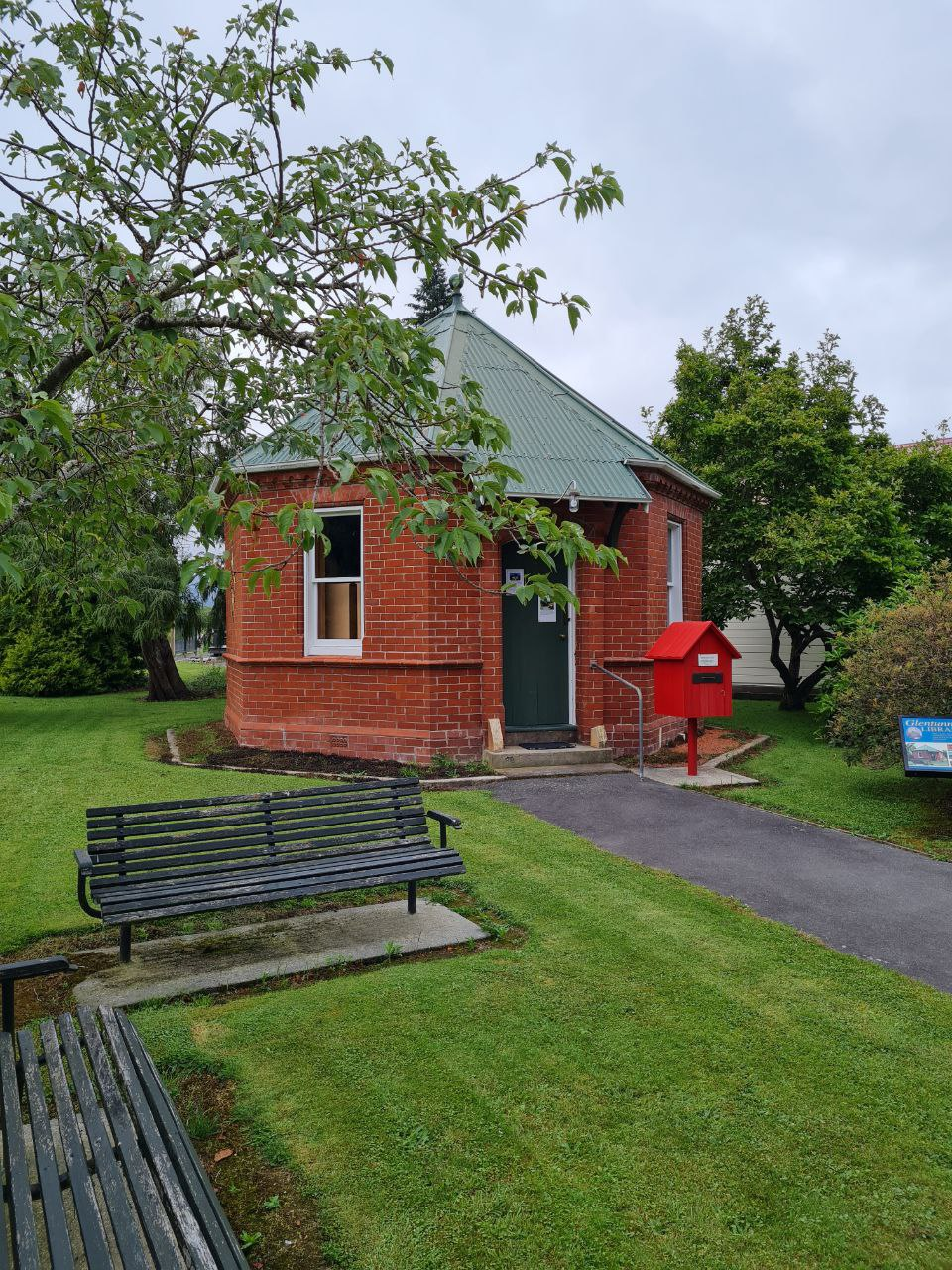
Glentunnel Library and Post Office, built in 1888

Few remnants of the railway remain in the town, with the station's platform incorporated into the backyard of a private residence. The goods platform can still be seen from Railway Terrace, in amongst farmland.

St Luke's Anglican church used to be situated on the corner of State Highway 77 and Victoria Street. The church was built in 1904, but it caught fire in the 1970s which caused partial damage to the building. It was later demolished. The grounds are now privately owned.

=== 2000–2010 ===
On 18 June 2003, the Glentunnel Community Hall was set alight, causing major damage. The Malvern Record reports:

"At approximately 2.15am on Wednesday the 18th of June the alarm was raised to a fire at the Glentunnel Hall. The call was made by a person travelling through to Invercargill.

When units arrived on the scene the fire had a good hold on the building with the entire building being engulfed in flames. Four units attended the callout; two from Coalgate and two from Darfield. Also in attendance was a water tanker from the local council. The fire was brought under control within 15 minutes of the units arriving, with the fire being fully extinguished within an hour.

The damage from the road is hard to detect but as you can see from the photographs the damage to the hall is extensive with the entire building being gutted. This is a big loss for the Glentunnel Community." (Note: An original newspaper clipping of this article can be found at the Glentunnel Museum.)

On 28 January 2006, the new community centre was opened, replacing the former hall.

==== 2010 Canterbury earthquake ====
The historic Homebush Homestead, located four kilometres east from Glentunnel was extensively damaged by the 2010 Canterbury earthquake, so much so that it has been described as being "practically in ruins". It was later demolished and a new homestead was built on the same site. The bell tower of the historic St John's Church (built in 1911) partially collapsed, causing damage to the nave and destroying the organ. St Andrew's of the Glen church was subsequently closed following the earthquake.

=== 2020s–present ===
In May 2021, the Hororata Golf Course (located in Glentunnel) suffered severe damage caused by flooding from the breached Selwyn River, with it being "largely unrecognisable" as a result. The camping grounds were also evacuated, with campervans and cabins being washed away. It was thought that it would take weeks to repair the damage.

== Demographics ==
Glentunnel is described by Stats NZ as a rural settlement, and covers 0.21 km^{2} (0.081 sq mi). It had an estimated population of 170 as of June 2025, with a population density of 810 people per km^{2}. It is part of the larger Glentunnel statistical area.

Historical population for Glentunnel settlement
Year	Pop.	±% p.a.
2006	141	—
2013	150	+0.89%
2018	162	+1.55%
2023	171	+1.09%

The settlement had a population of 171 in the 2023 New Zealand census, an increase of 9 people (5.6%) since the 2018 census, and an increase of 21 people (14.0%) since the 2013 census. There were 84 males and 87 females in 78 dwellings. 1.8% of people identified as LGBTIQ+. The median age was 58.5 years (compared with 38.1 years nationally). There were 24 people (14.0%) aged under 15 years, 15 (8.8%) aged 15 to 29, 78 (45.6%) aged 30 to 64, and 54 (31.6%) aged 65 or older.

People could identify as more than one ethnicity. The results were 94.7% European (Pākehā), 7.0% Māori, 3.5% Pasifika, 1.8% Asian, and 3.5% other, which includes people giving their ethnicity as "New Zealander". English was spoken by 98.2%, Māori by 1.8%, and other languages by 7.0%. No language could be spoken by 1.8% (e.g. too young to talk). The percentage of people born overseas was 17.5, compared with 28.8% nationally.

The sole religious affiliation given was 28.1% Christian. People who answered that they had no religion were 61.4%, and 10.5% of people did not answer the census question.

Of those at least 15 years old, 21 (14.3%) people had a bachelor's or higher degree, 84 (57.1%) had a post-high school certificate or diploma, and 42 (28.6%) people exclusively held high school qualifications. The median income was $25,100, compared with $41,500 nationally. 6 people (4.1%) earned over $100,000 compared to 12.1% nationally. The employment status of those at least 15 was 54 (36.7%) full-time and 21 (14.3%) part-time.

=== Glentunnel statistical area ===
The Glentunnel statistical area, which also includes Coalgate, Hawkins, Homebush and Whitecliffs, covers 157.17 km^{2} (60.68 sq mi). It had an estimated population of 1,230 as of June 2025, with a population density of 7.8 people per km^{2}.

Historical population for Glentunnel statistical area
Year	Pop.	±% p.a.
2006	891	—
2013	1,053	+2.42%
2018	1,128	+1.39%
2023	1,194	+1.14%
The 2006 population is for a larger area of 159.68 km^{2}. Source:

The statistical area had a population of 1,194 in the 2023 New Zealand census, an increase of 66 people (5.9%) since the 2018 census, and an increase of 141 people (13.4%) since the 2013 census. There were 591 males, 600 females, and 3 people of other genders in 510 dwellings. 2.0% of people identified as LGBTIQ+. The median age was 47.0 years (compared with 38.1 years nationally). There were 216 people (18.1%) aged under 15 years, 123 (10.3%) aged 15 to 29, 600 (50.3%) aged 30 to 64, and 255 (21.4%) aged 65 or older.

People could identify as more than one ethnicity. The results were 96.0% European (Pākehā); 7.5% Māori; 1.3% Pasifika; 1.3% Asian; 0.3% Middle Eastern, Latin American and African New Zealanders (MELAA); and 2.0% other, which includes people giving their ethnicity as "New Zealander". English was spoken by 98.2%, Māori by 1.5%, and other languages by 6.5%. No language could be spoken by 1.5% (e.g. too young to talk). New Zealand Sign Language was known by 0.3%. The percentage of people born overseas was 19.1, compared with 28.8% nationally.

Religious affiliations were 26.1% Christian, 0.5% Hindu, 0.3% Māori religious beliefs, 0.8% New Age, and 0.3% other religions. People who answered that they had no religion were 63.3%, and 8.8% of people did not answer the census question.

Of those at least 15 years old, 180 (18.4%) people had a bachelor's or higher degree, 561 (57.4%) had a post-high school certificate or diploma, and 234 (23.9%) people exclusively held high school qualifications. The median income was $39,400, compared with $41,500 nationally. 81 people (8.3%) earned over $100,000 compared to 12.1% nationally. The employment status of those at least 15 was 492 (50.3%) full-time, 180 (18.4%) part-time, and 12 (1.2%) unemployed.

== Ecology ==
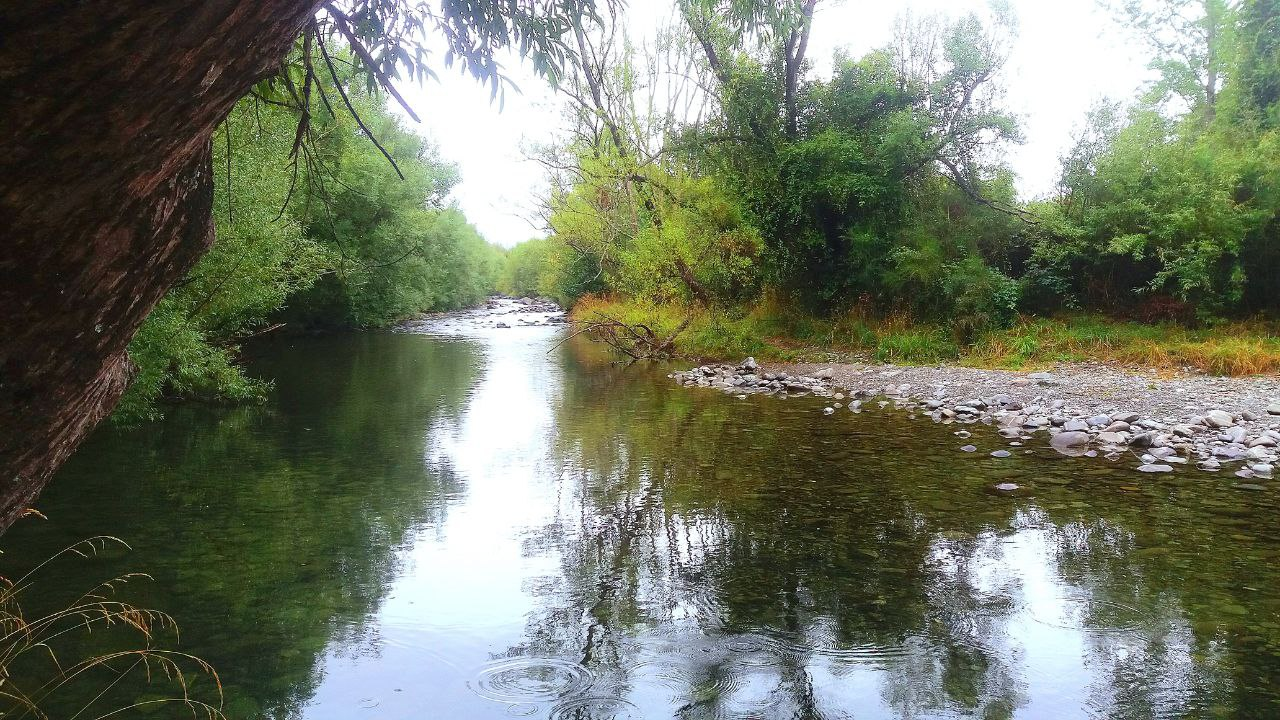
The swimming hole at the Glentunnel Holiday Park (February 2020)

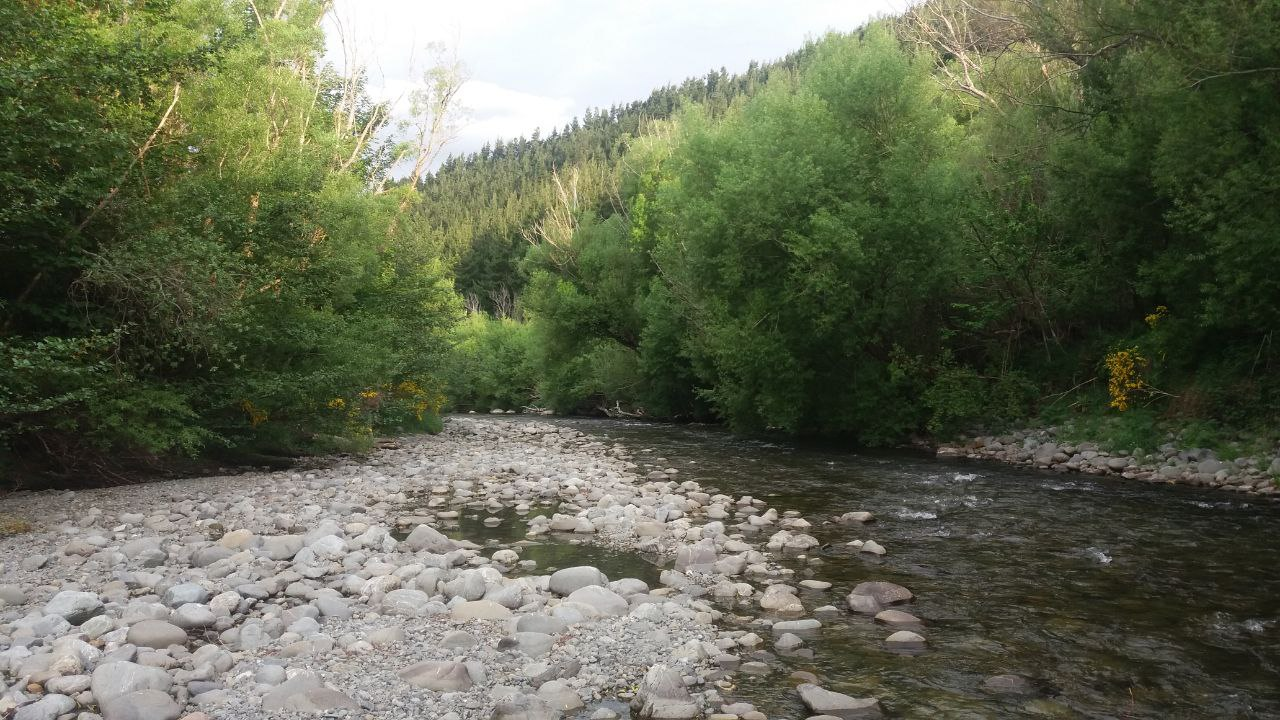
The River Walk, where the Wairiri Stream meets the Selwyn River (November 2019)

Joyce Reserve is a part of a Canterbury Plain-wide vision for a network of native forest. A total of 100,000 native trees have been planted by local school children and other volunteers. The aim is to encourage native birds to repopulate the region, as well as have a safe 'green path' from the Southern Alps to Lake Ellesmere, in between the two rivers (Rakaia and Waimakariri). Thus far, kingfishers, bellbirds, and waxeyes have inhabited the area.

=== Recreation ===
Glentunnel has many recreational walkways. These include the River Walk, a walkway that follows the Selwyn River from the camping ground to the one-lane bridge at the western end of Glentunnel, and the Millennium Walkway, which follows the former tramway route up to the disused tunnel which gave the township its name. This walkway was opened in 2000.

Glentunnel also has a domain, where cricket, football or rugby can be played. To the south of the domain is the Glentunnel campground, which is popular during the summer months for its location next to the Selwyn River.

Adjacent to the domain is the Hororata Golf Club.

== Education ==
Glentunnel Primary School is Glentunnel's sole primary school. It opened on 8 March 1879, with an initial daily attendance of 54 students. It has 101 students as of July 2026, ranging from years 1 to 6.

== Industry ==
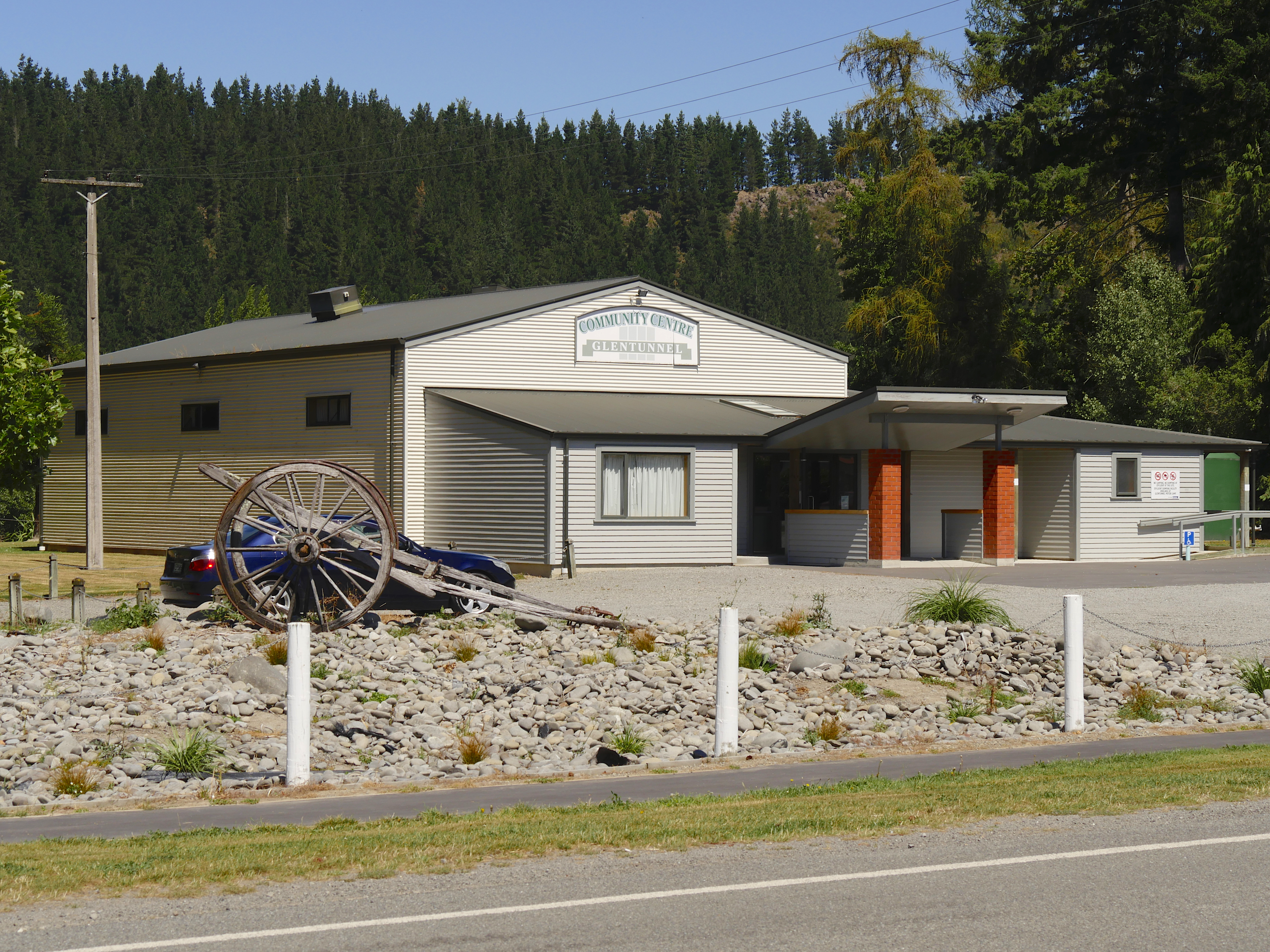
Glentunnel Community Centre

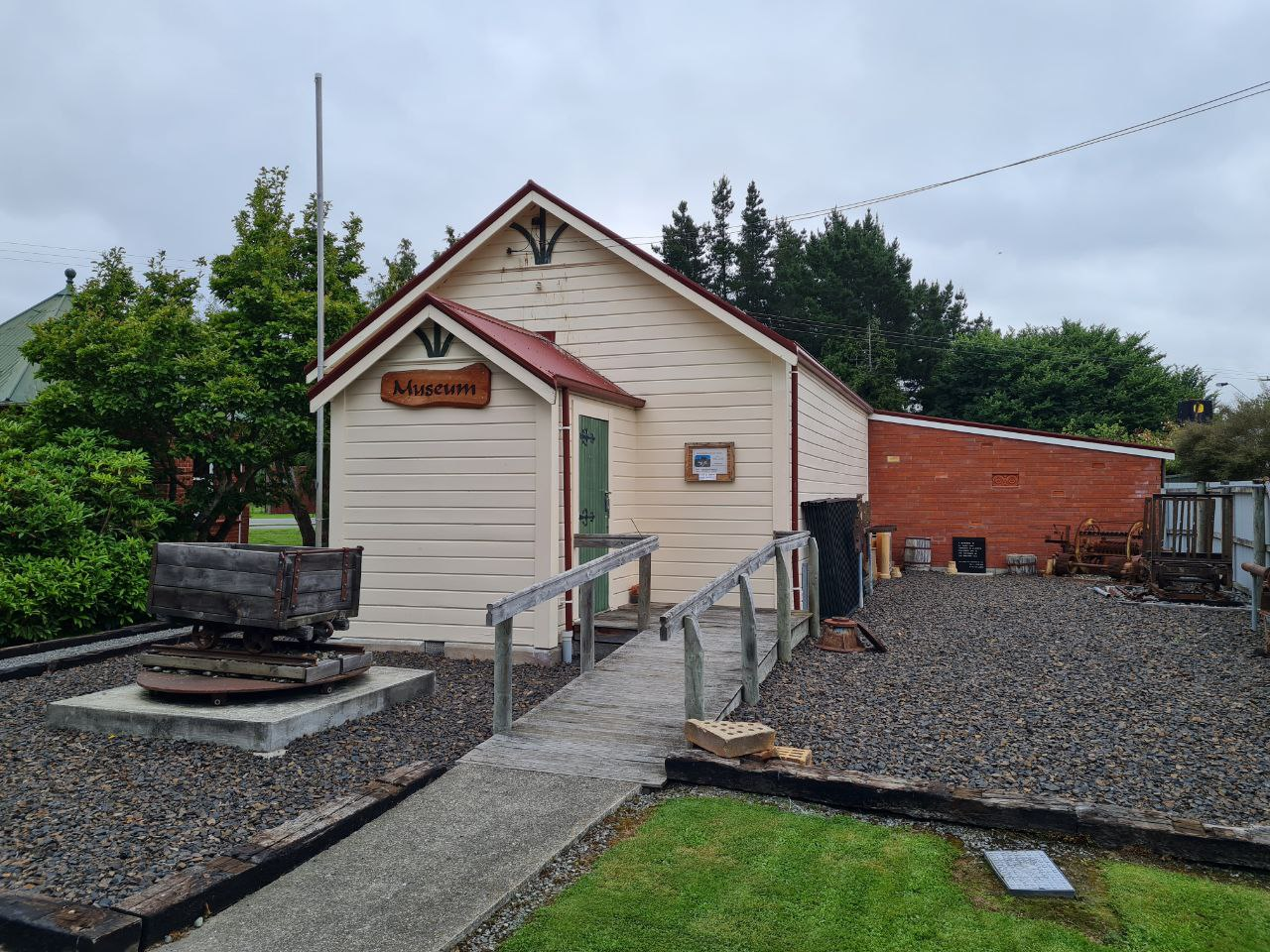
Glentunnel Museum

=== Mining ===
Industrial activity such as lignite coal mining used to take place in the region around Glentunnel. This was one reason as to why the railway was built, but industrial activity declined sharply in the 20th century and has been effectively non-existent since the 1980s. However, one open-pit coal mine is still operated by Bathurst Resources Limited.

=== Brickworks ===
The Glentunnel Brick and Pottery Works was located at the end of Philip Street, operating from 1875 until its closure on 31 October 1983. They were manufactures of bricks, tiles and pottery. Products from the brickworks were used to build the Homebush Homestead, as well as other farm buildings around the Deans' Homebush station.

== Services ==
Glentunnel has a general store. Two churches are also located here: a Brethren church and a combined denominational church of Anglican, Methodist and Presbyterian. Cafés, a community centre, garage, library and post office, museums, and a playground are also located in the village.

The New Zealand Army has an ammunition depot in Glentunnel.
