= Olive Webb =

New Zealand psychologist

Olive Webb ONZM
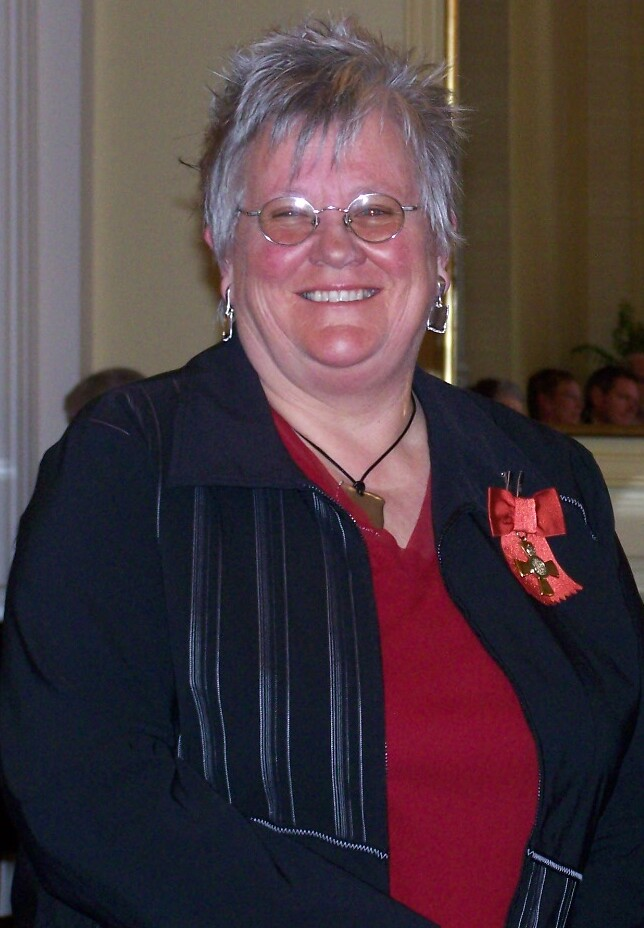
- Webb in 2008
- Born: 1946 or 1947; Waipa District, Waikato, New Zealand
- Awards: New Zealand Order of Merit (2008)
- Scientific career
- Fields: Environmental psychology, intellectual disability, autism spectrum
- Workplaces: University of Canterbury, University of Otago, University of Waikato
- Thesis: The effects of different residential environments on the behaviour of intellectually handicapped adults (unpublished) (1983)

Olive Webb ONZM (born 1946 or 1947) is a New Zealand clinical psychologist and former president of the New Zealand Psychological Society from 1993 until 1995. Webb's experiences of poor patient conditions and treatment while working at Sunnyside Hospital in the 1970s inspired her to become a disability advocate. She received the New Zealand Order of Merit in 2008, for services to people with intellectual disabilities. Webb is the longest-serving member of the Canterbury District Health Board, holding a position on the board from 2001 to 2013.

== Biography ==
Webb was born in 1946 or 1947, in rural Waipa District south of Te Awamutu. Her mother would hold annual parties for the residents of the Tokanui Psychiatric Hospital, and during high school and her early years at university, Web worked as a nurse aide at the hospital. She attended Te Awamutu College and the University of Waikato, where she studied geography.

Webb became frustrated with well-intentioned volunteers at the hospital, deciding to gain qualifications to better help residents of the hospital. Webb shifted to the South Island, studying clinical psychology at the University of Canterbury. In 1968, Webb began working at Sunnyside Hospital, a Christchurch mental asylum, as an assistant clinical psychologist. She spent 27 years working at the facility, during which she developed major concerns for patients' wellbeing, noting that staff had not received adequate training, and that patients were mistreated and understimulated, often spending much of their time unoccupied in cramped rooms. While working for the hospital, Webb completed a PhD in 1984, and a Post Graduate Diploma of Health Services Management in 1992.

Webb was appointed the Manager of the Psychiatric Service for adults with intellectual disability at Sunnyside Hospital, the first non-medical professional to be appointed in this role. During this time, Webb reduced the number of in-patients at the hospital from 150 to 25, by developing community care plans for patients. Webb also advocated for better medical checks for people with intellectual disabilities, after contributing to research which showed that 73% of patients in the study required medical care. Webb's work was a major factor in the deinstitutionalisation of New Zealand's mental health services, which led to psychiatric hospitals closing and being replaced with community mental health services.

From 1993 until 1995, Webb was the president of the New Zealand Psychological Society. In the 1990s, Webb moved from West Melton (where she had lived for 25 years) to Hororata, where she became a community leader.

In January 2001, Webb was elected as one of the inaugural members of the Canterbury District Health Board, during which she worked on developing the Intellectual Disability (Compulsory Care and Rehabilitation) Act 2003. When Webb stood down in 2013, she became the longest-serving member of the board. In the same year, Webb ran an unsuccessful bid to become the mayor of Selwyn District, coming second to incumbent Kelvin Coe.

Since 2020, Webb has worked with Living Options, a charitable trust supporting people with disabilities in the Queenstown-Lakes District.

In 2022, Webb took part in the Abuse in Care – Royal Commission of Inquiry, during which she likened treatment disabled people experienced in psychiatric care to World War II concentration camps.

Webb has been a trustee, chair or board member for a number of community trusts, including New Zealand Riding for the Disabled, Special Olympics New Zealand, Central Plains Water Trust, Hororata Community Trust and Selwyn Central Community Care Trust.

== Awards ==
In 2008, Webb received the New Zealand Order of Merit for services to people with intellectual disabilities, due to her work on deinstitutionalisation and the development of community mental health services. In 2018, Webb was given the Distinguished Service award by the Australasian Society for Intellectual Disability.

== Personal life ==
Webb is a lesbian. She entered a civil union with her long-time partner Carol Gurney in 2004. Webb was an organist for the St John's Church in Hororata until the organ was destroyed in the 2010 Canterbury earthquake. Since then, she has performed piano for the church, and sings in the Selwyn Community Choir.

== Bibliography ==
- Webb, Olive J; McNickle, Donald C (1982). "A Comparison of the Adaptive Social Behaviour of Intellectually Handicapped Sheltered Workshop Trainees from Three Different Residential Backgrounds". Australia and New Zealand Journal of Developmental Disabilities. 8 (1): 21–25. doi:10.3109/13668258209016124. ISSN 0726-3864.
- Glue, Paul; Webb, Olive J; Surgenor, Lois (1988). "Psychopathology in adult mentally handicapped hospital patients". Australian and New Zealand Journal of Psychiatry. 22 (3): 312–315. doi:10.3109/00048678809161213. ISSN 0004-8674. PMID 3178616. S2CID 11713840.
- Webb, O. J.; Rogers, L. (1999). "Health screening for people with intellectual disability: the New Zealand experience". Journal of Intellectual Disability Research. 43 (6): 497–503. doi:10.1046/j.1365-2788.1999.00233.x. ISSN 0964-2633. PMID 10622366.
- Dovey, Susan; Webb, Olive J (2000). "General practitioners' perception of their role in care for people with intellectual disability". Journal of Intellectual Disability Research. 44 (5): 553–561. doi:10.1046/j.1365-2788.2000.00269.x. ISSN 0964-2633. PMID 11079352.
- Webb, O.J.; Gates, S. (2000). "Informed consent in and people who have intellectual disability". In Love, H.; Whittaker, W. (eds.). Practice Issues for Clinical and Applied Psychologists in New Zealand. Wellington: New Zealand Psychological Society. pp. 43–56.
- Webb, O.; Verhoeven, M.; Eggleston, E. (2007). "Principles of psychological work for people with intellectual disabilities". In Evans, I. M.; Rucklidge, J. J.; O'Driscoll, M. (eds.). Professional Practice of Psychology in Aotearoa/New Zealand. Wellington: New Zealand Psychological Society. pp. 445–465.
