= Prebbleton =

- Minor urban area
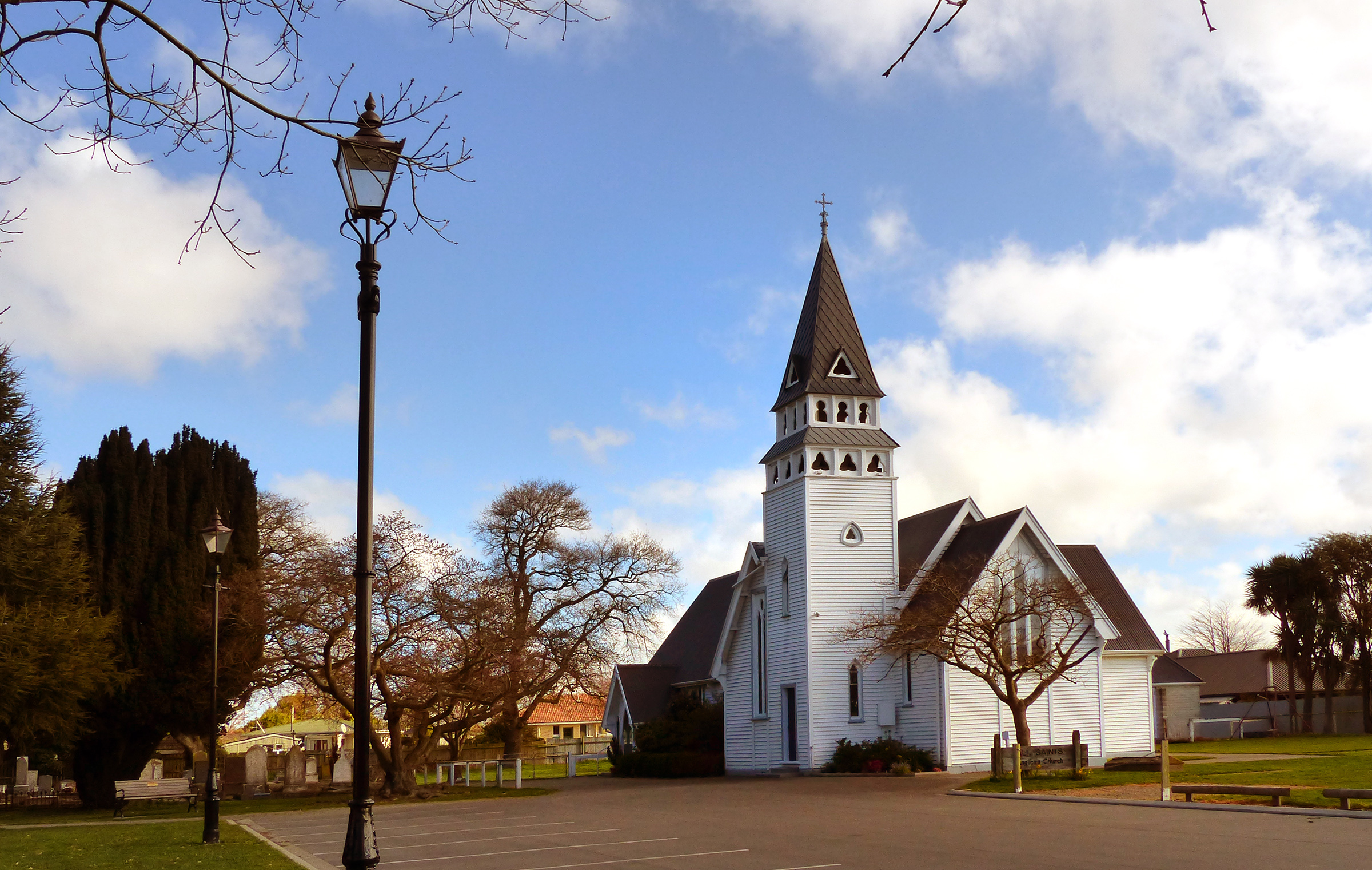
- All Saints Church, August 2014
- Interactive map of Prebbleton
- Coordinates: 43°34′42″S 172°30′48″E
- Country: New Zealand
- Region: Canterbury
- Territorial authority: Selwyn District
- Ward: Springs
- Electorates: Wigram; Te Tai Tonga (Māori)

Government
  - Territorial authority: Selwyn District Council
  - Regional council: Environment Canterbury
  - Mayor of Selwyn: Lydia Gliddon
  - Wigram MP: Dominik Yanzick
  - Te Tai Tonga MP: Mananui Ramsden

Area
  - Total: 5.30 km^{2} (2.05 sq mi)
- Elevation: 25 m (82 ft)

Population (June 2025)
  - Total: 5,750
  - Density: 1,080/km^{2} (2,810/sq mi)
- Time zone: UTC+12 (New Zealand Standard Time)
  - Summer (DST): UTC+13 (New Zealand Daylight Time)
- Postcode: 7604
- Area code: 03

Prebbleton is a small town in the Selwyn District in the Canterbury Region of New Zealand. It is 11 km southwest of the centre of Christchurch and about 2 km south of the outlying industrial suburb of Hornby.

Prebbleton dates back to 1855, making it one of the earliest settlements on the Canterbury Plains. The Prebble brothers, originally from Kent, England, settled in the district.

The village has experienced considerable growth with several subdivisions built in the last two decades.

== Demographics ==
Prebbleton is described by Statistics New Zealand as a small urban area, and covers 5.30 km^{2} (2.05 sq mi). It had an estimated population of 5,750 as of June 2025, with a population density of 1,127 people per km^{2}.

Historical population
Year	Pop.	±% p.a.
2006	2,001	—
2013	2,775	+4.78%
2018	4,518	+10.24%
2023	5,382	+3.56%
The 2006 population is for a smaller area of 5.10 km^{2}. Source:

Prebbleton had a population of 5,382 in the 2023 New Zealand census, an increase of 864 people (19.1%) since the 2018 census, and an increase of 2,607 people (93.9%) since the 2013 census. There were 2,604 males, 2,763 females, and 15 people of other genders in 1,872 dwellings. 2.0% of people identified as LGBTIQ+. The median age was 43.5 years (compared with 38.1 years nationally). There were 1,047 people (19.5%) aged under 15 years, 789 (14.7%) aged 15 to 29, 2,667 (49.6%) aged 30 to 64, and 879 (16.3%) aged 65 or older.

People could identify as more than one ethnicity. The results were 87.7% European (Pākehā); 5.6% Māori; 1.1% Pasifika; 10.6% Asian; 0.8% Middle Eastern, Latin American and African New Zealanders (MELAA); and 2.9% other, which includes people giving their ethnicity as "New Zealander". English was spoken by 97.3%, Māori by 0.8%, Samoan by 0.1%, and other languages by 11.0%. No language could be spoken by 1.6% (e.g. too young to talk). New Zealand Sign Language was known by 0.4%. The percentage of people born overseas was 20.4, compared with 28.8% nationally.

Religious affiliations were 34.2% Christian, 0.6% Hindu, 0.3% Islam, 0.1% Māori religious beliefs, 0.3% Buddhist, 0.3% New Age, and 0.7% other religions. People who answered that they had no religion were 57.8%, and 5.7% of people did not answer the census question.

Of those at least 15 years old, 1,317 (30.4%) people had a bachelor's or higher degree, 2,373 (54.7%) had a post-high school certificate or diploma, and 645 (14.9%) people exclusively held high school qualifications. The median income was $55,000, compared with $41,500 nationally. 996 people (23.0%) earned over $100,000 compared to 12.1% nationally. The employment status of those at least 15 was 2,334 (53.8%) full-time, 753 (17.4%) part-time, and 63 (1.5%) unemployed.

Individual statistical areas
Name	Area (km^{2})	Population	Density (per km^{2})	Dwellings	Median age	Median income
Prebbleton North	3.33	2,325	698	807	45.3 years	$54,900
Prebbleton South	1.97	3,057	1,552	1,068	42.0 years	$55,100
New Zealand					38.1 years	$41,500

== Education ==
Prebbleton School is a full primary school catering for years 1 to 8. It had a roll of 548 as of July 2026. The school opened in 1857.
