= Glentunnel Library =

Historic library in Glentunnel, New Zealand

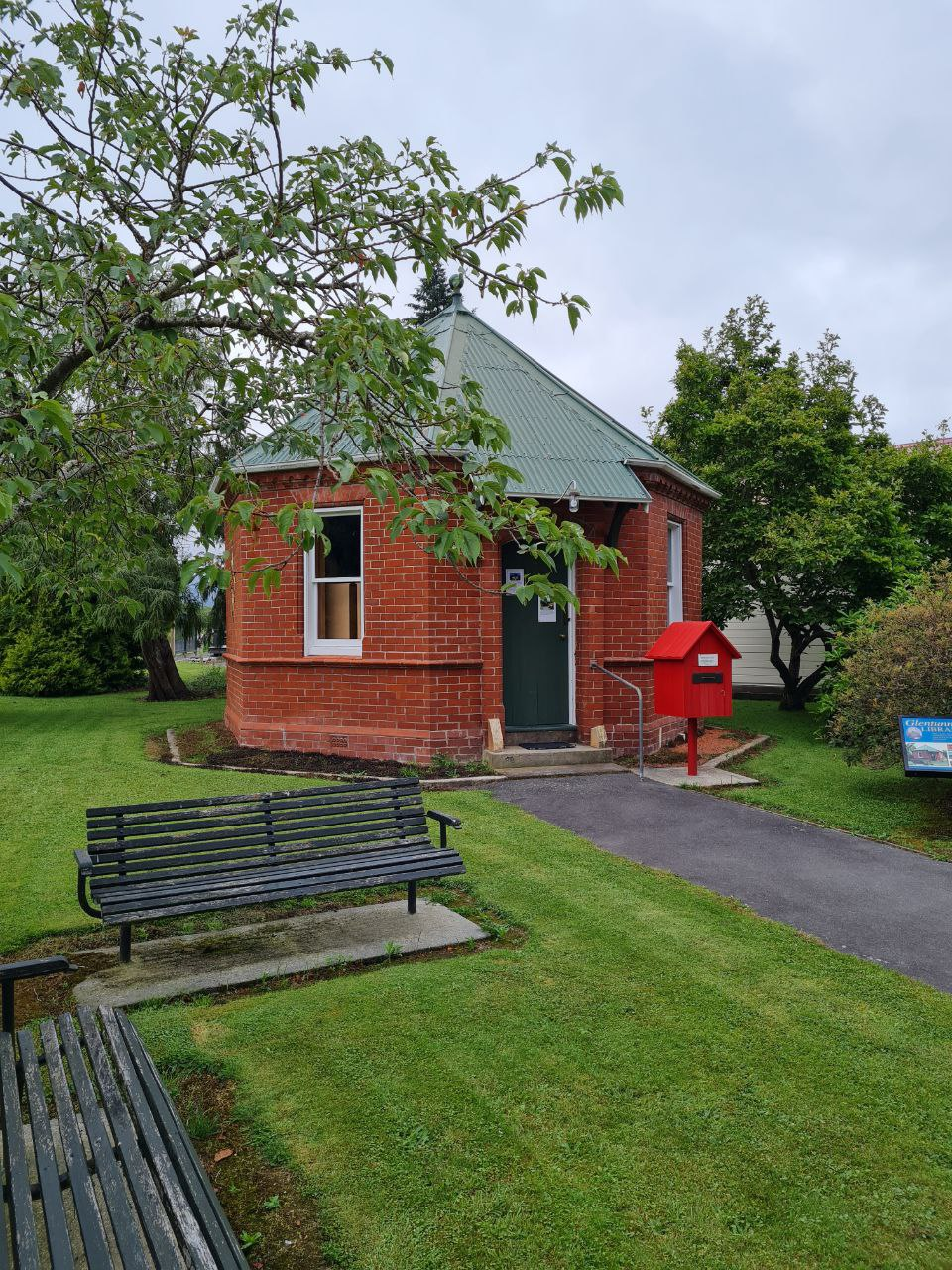
- Glentunnel Library and Post Office, December 2023
- Interactive map of Glentunnel Library
- 43°28′51.8″S 171°55′52.8″E
- Type: Public library
- Location: Philip Street, Glentunnel, New Zealand

History
- Built: c. 1886–1887

Site notes
- Architect: Samuel Hurst Seager
- Architectural styles: Victorian; brick construction
- Restored: 2014–2015
- Owner: Selwyn District Council

Heritage New Zealand – Category 2
- Official name: Glentunnel Library
- Type: Historic Place
- Designated: 23 June 1983
- Reference no.: 1790
- Administered by: Heritage New Zealand Pouhere Taonga

The Glentunnel Library is an historic public library and post office building in Glentunnel, New Zealand. It was constructed in the late 19th century, using brick and terracotta materials from a local brickmaking manufacturer. It serves as a landmark of Glentunnel's development during a period when local brickmaking was a major industry, hence its heritage status. Since 1983, it has been registered with Heritage New Zealand as a Category II historic place.

== History ==
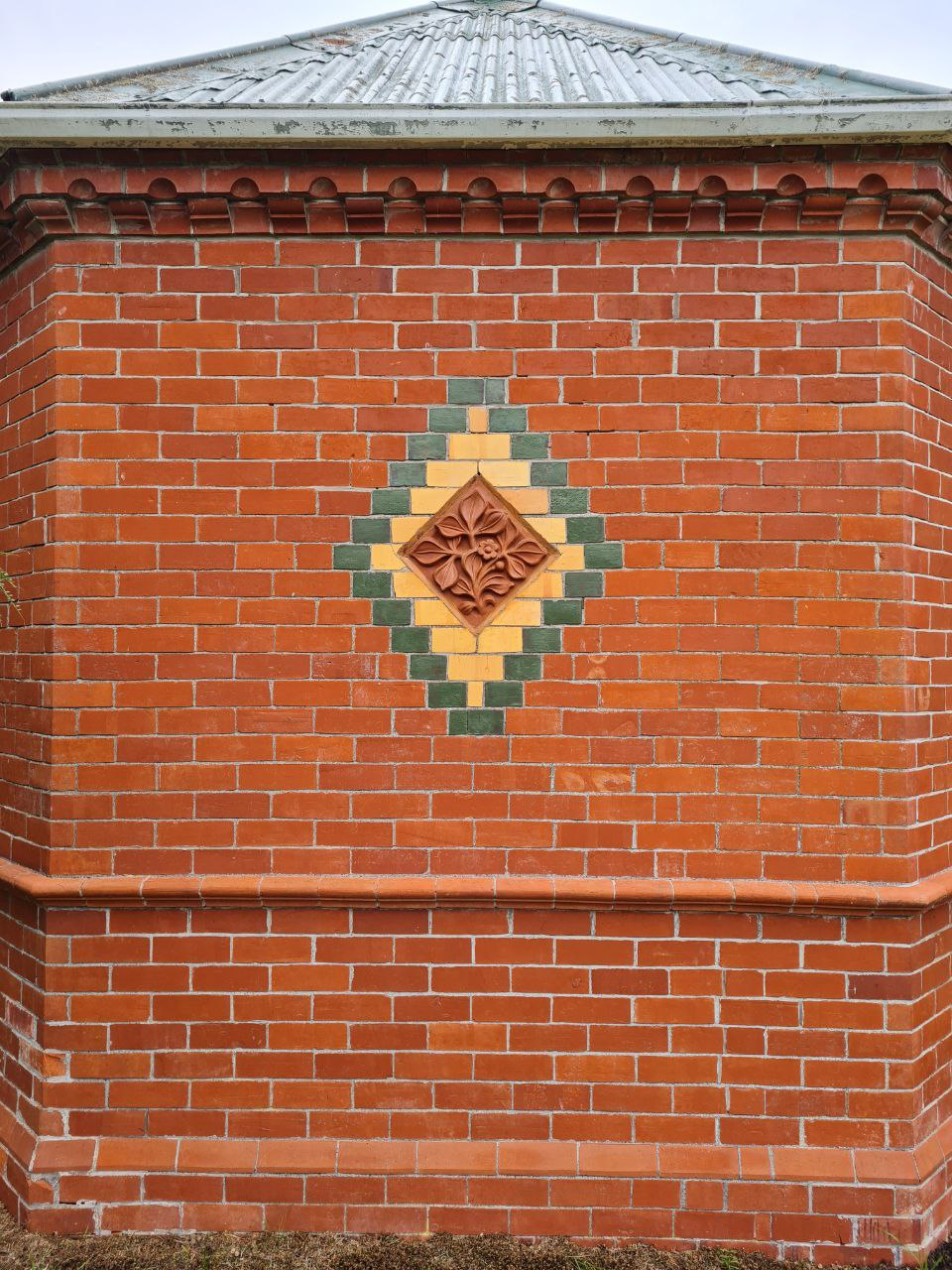
This terracotta tile pattern is no. 65 from the Homebush Works catalogue.

The first library provision in Glentunnel began in 1883 with a simple bookcase at Glentunnel Primary School. After an appeal by the local headmaster, Mr Opie, John Deans granted a parcel of land to the citizens of Glentunnel in 1886, and money was raised by public subscription to construct a dedicated library building. The structure, built by Thomas Lamport, reportedly incorporated every type of brick and terracotta tile then produced by the nearby Homebush Brick, Tile and Pottery Works, directly showcasing the town's industrial heritage.

In September 1886 and again in October 1887 the Christchurch architect Samuel Hurst Seager advertised for tenders for the erection of the Glentunnel library in brick.

Tenders are invited for the erection of a library in brick at Glentunnel. Plans and specifications can be seen at my office till the 16th and at Glentunnel till the 20th, on which date tenders are to be delivered. S. Hurst Seager, A.R.I.M. architect. 170 Hereford Street.

On 7 December 1891, the title for the land was signed over to the trustees of the Glentunnel Public Library, formally establishing its role as a public library.

A post office service began here in 1984.

=== Heritage status ===
The library and its original brick gateposts were formally listed with the Historic Places Trust (now Heritage New Zealand) on 29 July 1983, as a Category II historic place, recognising their historical and cultural significance.

=== 2010 Canterbury earthquake ===
In the wake of the 2010 Canterbury earthquake, the library suffered damage and was red-stickered. For its restoration, the Selwyn District Council provided project management for the $180,000 earthquake repair, funded through insurance settlement. AECOM were the consultants on the project and Graham Creed Builders were the contractors. During the refurbishment (2014–2015) the building's linings were stripped out and the floor lifted and reattached to the walls. A new interior framework was built and attached to the exterior brickwork to help support it. The underfloor and walls were insulated and the rimu matched lining replaced, while new carpet, lighting and a heating system were also installed.

A public opening of the restoration work occurred on 2 December 2015. The work led to the building receiving a Highly Commended – Public Realm: Saved and Restored award at the 2016 Canterbury Heritage Awards.

== Architectural features ==
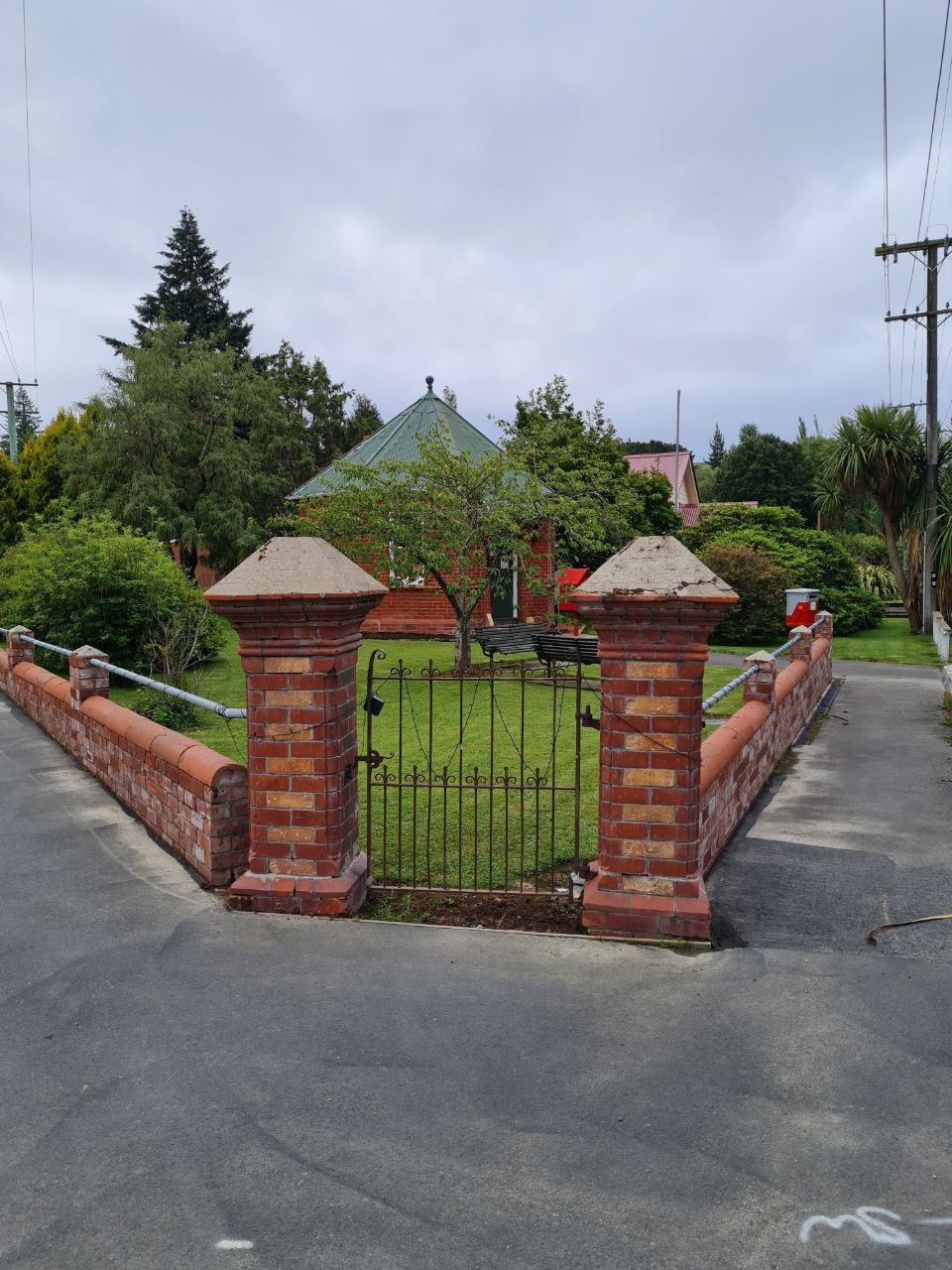
The original gateposts and rebuilt (2000) brick walls, December 2023

Polychrome brick gateposts with an iron gate mark the corner entrance to the site. The library building is set back approximately 15 metres from the gateposts and is a single-storey, octagonal, double-brick structure. Decorative cornice mouldings support an octagonal roof clad in corrugated steel and surmounted by a circular finial. The main entrance is located on the south-east side, and four of the eight elevations contain sash windows. The remaining elevations incorporate coloured tiles and terracotta decorative elements. A chimney breast is located on the western elevation and supports a rebuilt brick chimney.

The interior is open plan, measuring less than five metres at its widest point. Timber lining covers most internal surfaces, including the walls and a double-coved ceiling. Rimu shelving lines much of the perimeter, allowing direct access to the library's collection.
