= Kelvin Coe (mayor) =

New Zealand politician (1944–2026)

Kelvin Coe ONZM
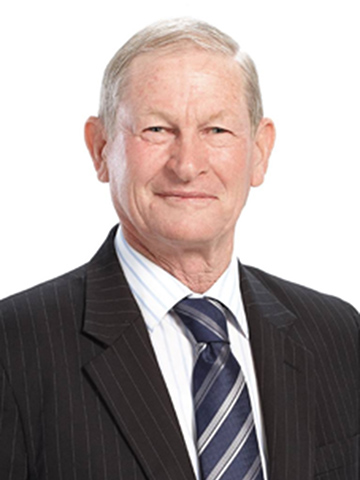
- Official portrait, 2013

4th Mayor of Selwyn
- In office 13 October 2007 – 8 October 2016
- Preceded by: Michael McEvedy
- Succeeded by: Sam Broughton

Personal details
- Born: Kelvin John Coe; 1944 Lincoln, New Zealand
- Died: 3 July 2026 (aged 82) Irwell, New Zealand
- Party: Independent
- Spouse: Gem Coe
- Children: 3
- Education: Lincoln College
- Profession: Politician, farmer

Kelvin John Coe ONZM (1944 – 3 July 2026) was a New Zealand politician. He served as the mayor of Selwyn District from 2007 to 2016.

== Early years ==
Coe was born in Lincoln in 1944. He attended Lincoln College (now known as Lincoln University), where he graduated with a Diploma in Valuation and Farm Management and a Bachelor of Commerce (Agriculture). Coe then spent three years working in Thailand with Volunteer Service Abroad in rural development work after which he returned to Irwell to farm a mixed sheep and cropping farm.

== Local-body politics ==
Before coming into local body politics Coe had long been involved in community groups – being a past Chairman of Leeston Consolidated Primary School Board of Trustees, a past President of Ellesmere Tennis Sub-Association and a past President of North Canterbury Federated Farmers. He was a government appointee to the Standards Association of NZ (second term as Deputy Chairman) and held directorships in Sicon (Council owned roading and service company) and Selwyn Investment Holdings Ltd.

Coe's emergence onto the political scene was in 1995 when he was elected as a councillor for the Selwyn District Council. He continued this role for four terms, holding the position of deputy mayor in the final term. In 2007 he stood for mayoralty against four candidates and was elected mayor of Selwyn on 13 October. Coe received 3,724 votes, followed by John Morten (2,618) and Debra Hasson (2,031). In October 2010 Coe was re-elected for a second term with 5,908 votes against former Selwyn mayor, Bill Woods (4,957).

During his second term as mayor, Coe saw the opening of the Selwyn Aquatic Centre in June 2013, the Lincoln Events Center in April 2011 and the completion of stage five of Izone Industrial Park in Rolleston.

In February 2013, Coe announced that he would stand for a third term in October. On 12 October he was elected from the pool of six candidates for his third term as mayor with 3185 votes, followed by ex-Canterbury District Health Board member Olive Webb (2709) and councillor Sam Broughton (2298). Coe announced that this would "most likely" be his final term.

Coe retired from office in October 2016, after completing his third term.

=== 2010 and 2011 earthquakes ===
Coe was the mayor at the time of both the 2010 and 2011 Canterbury earthquakes. He was one of the seven commissioners in the Canterbury Earthquake Recovery Commission, and worked with Civil Defense and locals in the recovery process of the area.

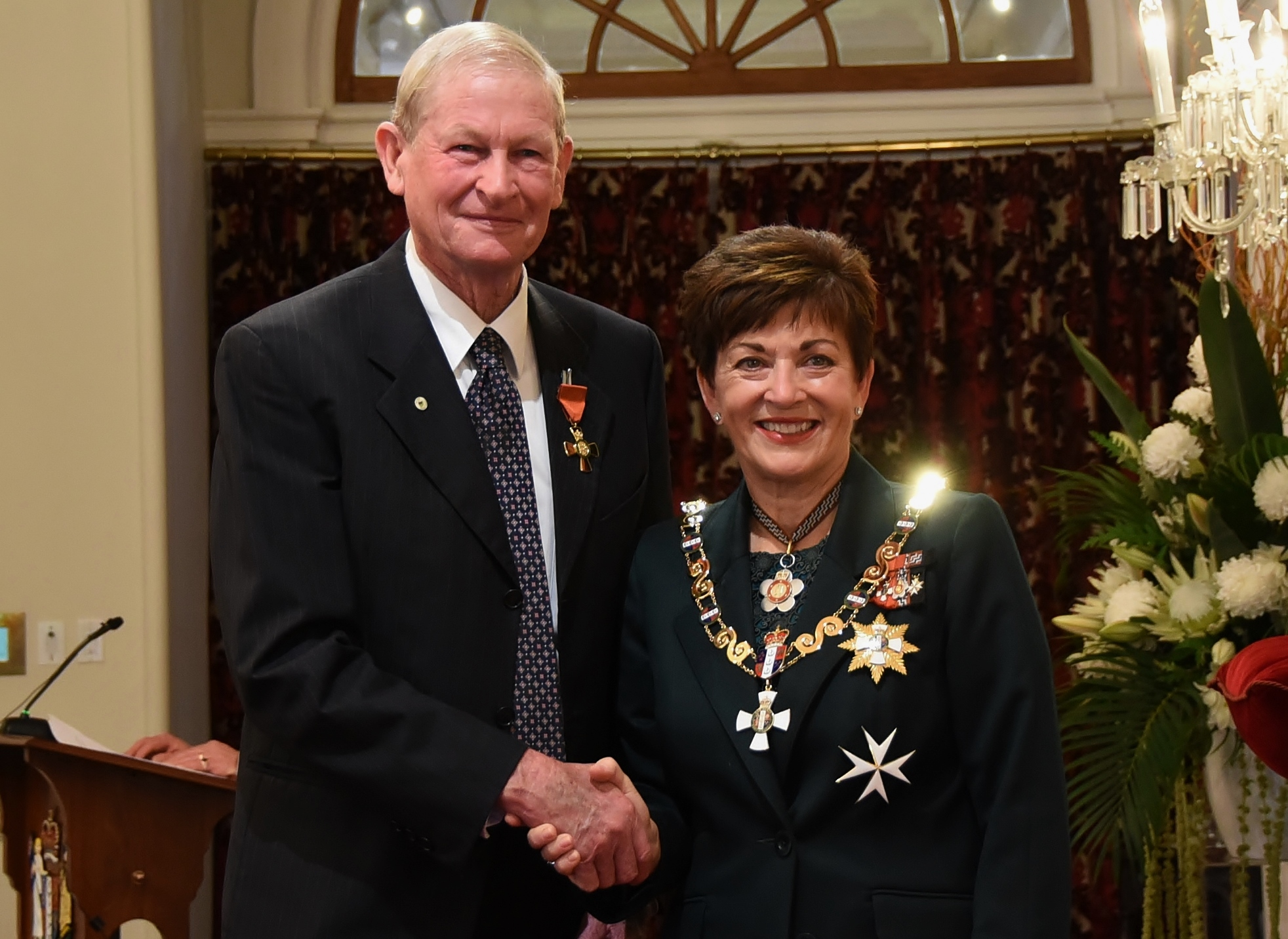
Coe receiving his honour from Governor-General, Dame Patsy Reddy, 2017

== Personal life and death ==
Coe was married to Gem Coe and together they had three daughters. He died at his home in Irwell, on 3 July 2026, at the age of 82.

== Honours and awards ==
In the 2017 New Year Honours, Coe was appointed an Officer of the New Zealand Order of Merit, for services to local government.
