= Thomas William Adams =

Farmer, forester, churchman, educationalist (1842–1919)

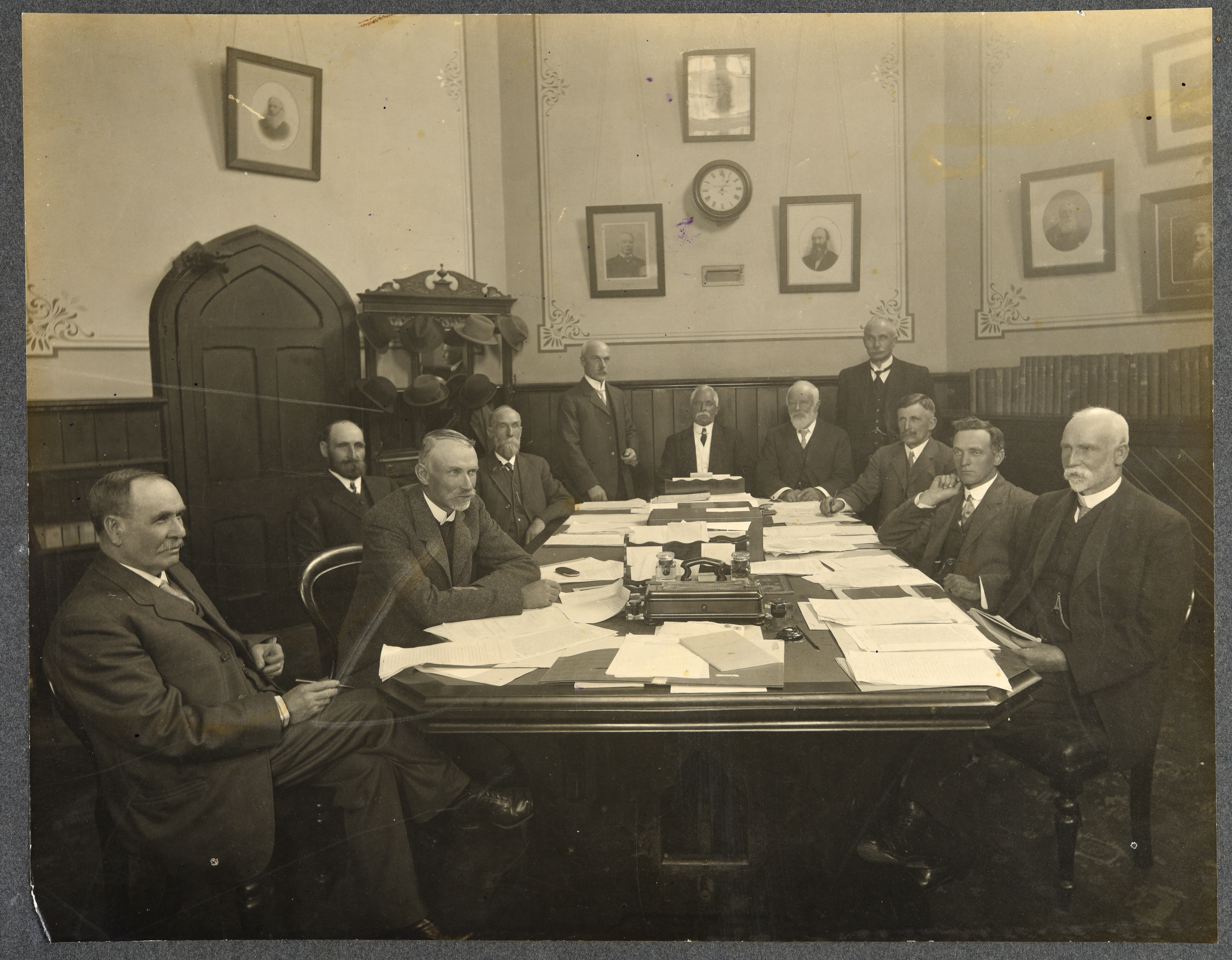
- Adams in 1916 (fifth from right) at an Education Board meeting
- Born: Alfred Albert Thomas William Adams; 24 June 1842; Gravely, Cambridgeshire, England
- Died: 1 June 1919 (aged 76); Greendale, New Zealand
- Occupation: farmer
- Known for: Forestry, Education

Alfred Albert Thomas William Adams (24 June 1842 – 1 June 1919), known as Thomas William Adams or more commonly TW Adams, was a New Zealand farmer, forester, churchman and educationalist.

He was born in Graveley, Cambridgeshire, England on 24 June 1842. In 1862 he emigrated to New Zealand on the African. He bought 100 acres (40 ha) of virgin tussock land at Greendale in Canterbury in 1865 and converted them to farmland. The area prospered over the next few years as more farmers developed land.

Adams married Lucy Pannett in 1867 and they had a daughter the following year. Lucy drowned in 1869. Adams married her sister Harriet in 1872, and they had five sons and three daughters together.

Adams was a pioneer in planting trials, obtaining seeds from correspondents around the world, keeping records and publishing the results. He started planting trees in 1868 for shelter and fuel, and by 1908 had created an arboretum of 800 species. His recommendation of Pinus radiata and other pines influenced early New Zealand forestry. In 1913 he was a member of the Royal Commission on Forestry, and in 1918 he became a lifetime member of the New Zealand Forestry League.

For 40 years, Adams taught Sunday school at Greendale, which began by teaching local children to read. He was instrumental in the formation of the Greendale day school in 1872, and served on the North Canterbury Education Board from 1892 to 1918, serving as chairman from 1897 to 1905. He was also a governor of Canterbury College (now University of Canterbury) from 1897 until his death.

He was the first secretary of the Canterbury Baptist Association, and later its president.

Adams died at Greendale on 1 June 1919 and was buried there. His will left £2000 and 98 acres (40 ha) of land to Canterbury College to be used for a school of forestry. Harriet died 15 January 1934 and was buried with him. The school of forestry opened in 1924, and about 1975 a T.W. Adams Scholarship was set up to support postgraduate forestry students.
