= Mayor of Selwyn =

New Zealand local government position

- Crest of the Selwyn District Council

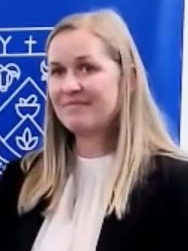
- Incumbent; Lydia Gliddon since 2025
- Style: Her Worship
- Seat: Rolleston
- Appointer: Elected
- Inaugural holder: Ann Hurford
- Formation: 1989
- Salary: $146,861
- Website: Official website

The mayor of Selwyn officiates over the Selwyn District Council, which governs New Zealand's Selwyn District. The mayor is directly elected using a first-past-the-post electoral system every three years. The immediate past mayor, Sam Broughton, lost his bid for re-election in the 2025 New Zealand local elections and was succeeded by Lydia Gliddon. The longest-serving mayor was Michael McEvedy, serving for twelve years.

== History ==
Selwyn District was established as part of the 1989 local government reforms. It was formed from Ellesmere County, Malvern County, and part of Paparua County.

The first mayor, Ann Hurford, was from an old Ellesmere farming family. The second mayor, Bill Woods, also held the mayoralty for one term (1992–1995). Woods is a perennial candidate and once stated he was "addicted" to elections; he was one of five candidates in the 2016 mayoral election. Michael McEvedy was mayor for four terms from 1995 to 2007, when he retired.

At the 2007 election, Kelvin Coe took over from McEvedy, being successful against four other candidates.

At the 2010 election, Coe defended himself against a challenge by former mayor Woods.

At the 2013 election, there were six candidates for the mayoralty (including former mayor Woods and then-future mayor Broughton), but Coe remained successful.

During the 2016 election, Coe stood down (after serving three terms) and five candidates contested the election, including former mayor Woods. Sam Broughton was elected and at the time, became one of the country's youngest mayors ever at the age of 35.

At the 2019 election, Broughton won his second term as mayor, contesting against former mayor Woods.

At the 2022 election, Sam Broughton won a third term in office, running against Calvin Payne and former mayor Woods.

At the 2025 election, Lydia Gilddon beat incumbent Broughton, with Brad Mannering coming in third place.

== List of mayors of Selwyn ==
Selwyn has had six mayors.

| | Name | Portrait | Term | Elections |
|---|---|---|---|---|
| 1 | Ann Hurford | | 1989–1992 | 1989 |
| 2 | Bill Woods QSM JP | | 1992–1995 | 1992 |
| 3 | Michael McEvedy QSO JP | | 1995–2007 | 1995; 1998; 2001; 2004 |
| 4 | Kelvin Coe ONZM | | 2007–2016 | 2007; 2010; 2013 |
| 5 | Sam Broughton | | 2016–2025 | 2016; 2019; 2022 |
| 6 | Lydia Gliddon | | 2025–present | 2025 |
