= Greendale, New Zealand =

Rural area in Canterbury, New Zealand

Greendale
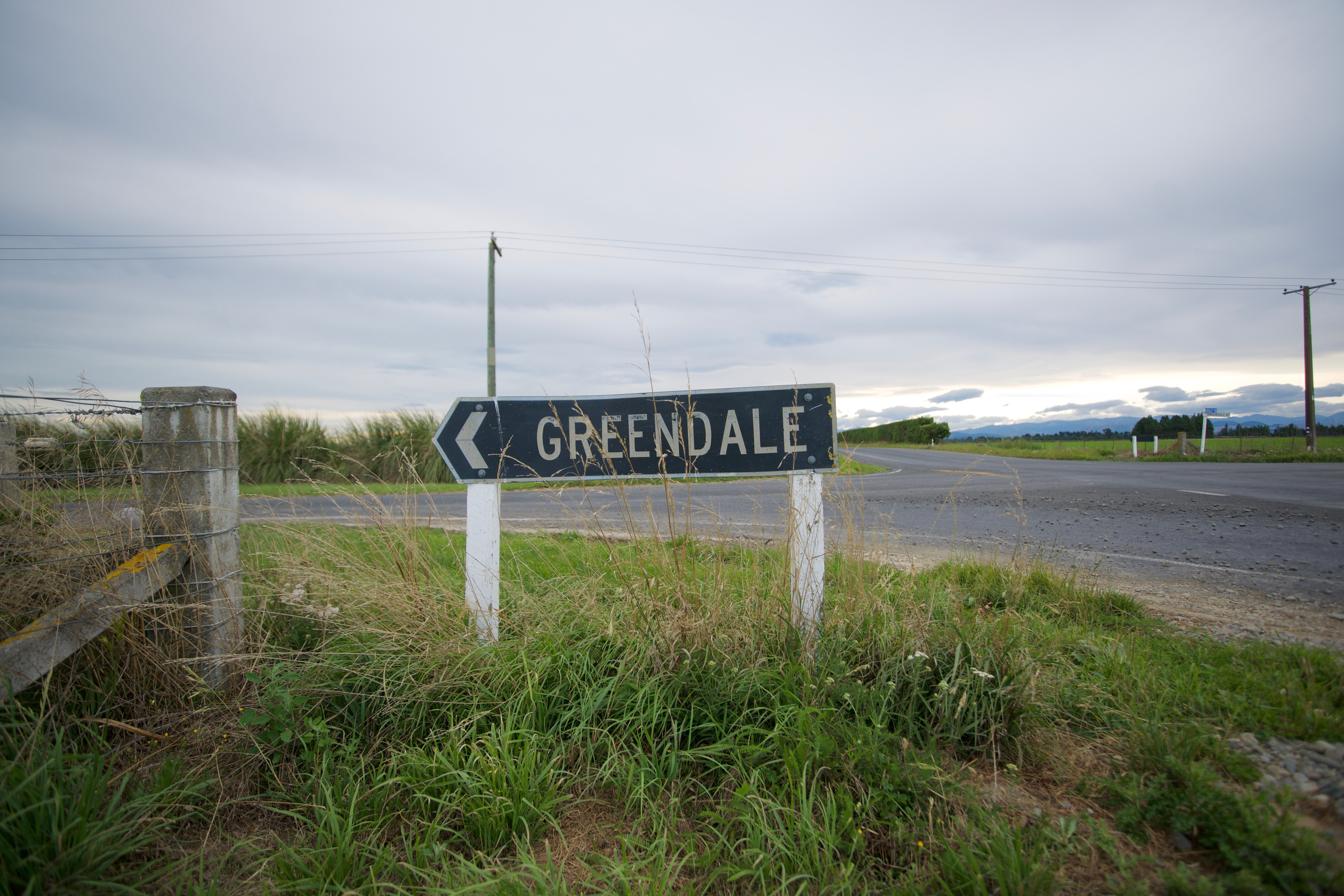
- Greendale road sign
- Interactive map of Greendale
- Coordinates: 43°35′S 172°5′E
- Country: New Zealand
- Region: Canterbury region
- District: Selwyn District
- Ward: Malvern
- Community: Malvern
- Electorates: Selwyn; Te Tai Tonga (Māori)

Government
  - Territorial authority: Selwyn District Council
  - Regional council: Environment Canterbury
  - Mayor of Selwyn: Lydia Gliddon
  - Selwyn MP: Nicola Grigg
  - Te Tai Tonga MP: Tākuta Ferris

Area
  - Total: 17.87 km^{2} (6.90 sq mi)

Population (2023 census)
  - Total: 114
  - Density: 6.38/km^{2} (16.5/sq mi)

Greendale is a lightly populated rural area, part of the Selwyn District, Canterbury, a region of New Zealand's South Island.

One of the first farmers was Thomas William Adams, a pioneer of forestry and education in the area. Another one of the first farmers was Charles Early who moved to Greendale (Water ford) in 1876.

On 4 September 2010, Greendale became further notable as the location of the strongest earthquake ground-shaking ever recorded in New Zealand, registering an acceleration 1.25 times that of gravity. This was later exceeded by the 2.2 g recordings during the February 2011 Christchurch earthquake at Heathcote Valley.

== Demographics ==
Greendale locality covers 17.87 km^{2} (6.90 sq mi). It is part of the larger Charing Cross statistical area.

Historical population for Greendale
Year	Pop.	±% p.a.
2006	66	—
2013	114	+8.12%
2018	126	+2.02%
2023	114	−1.98%

Greendale had a population of 114 in the 2023 New Zealand census, a decrease of 12 people (−9.5%) since the 2018 census, and unchanged since the 2013 census. There were 54 males and 57 females in 45 dwellings. 5.3% of people identified as LGBTIQ+. The median age was 48.9 years (compared with 38.1 years nationally). There were 18 people (15.8%) aged under 15 years, 12 (10.5%) aged 15 to 29, 60 (52.6%) aged 30 to 64, and 24 (21.1%) aged 65 or older.

People could identify as more than one ethnicity. The results were 97.4% European (Pākehā), 5.3% Māori, and 2.6% Asian. English was spoken by 97.4%, and other languages by 10.5%. The percentage of people born overseas was 13.2, compared with 28.8% nationally.

Religious affiliations were 31.6% Christian, and 2.6% other religions. People who answered that they had no religion were 63.2%, and 2.6% of people did not answer the census question.

Of those at least 15 years old, 27 (28.1%) people had a bachelor's or higher degree, 51 (53.1%) had a post-high school certificate or diploma, and 18 (18.8%) people exclusively held high school qualifications. The median income was $50,900, compared with $41,500 nationally. 9 people (9.4%) earned over $100,000 compared to 12.1% nationally. The employment status of those at least 15 was 51 (53.1%) full-time and 18 (18.8%) part-time.

=== Charing Cross statistical area ===
Charing Cross statistical area covers 168.68 km^{2} (65.13 sq mi). It had an estimated population of 920 as of June 2025, with a population density of 5.5 people per km^{2}.

Historical population for Charing Cross statistical area
Year	Pop.	±% p.a.
2006	696	—
2013	843	+2.78%
2018	885	+0.98%
2023	900	+0.34%

Charing Cross had a population of 900 in the 2023 New Zealand census, an increase of 15 people (1.7%) since the 2018 census, and an increase of 57 people (6.8%) since the 2013 census. There were 450 males and 450 females in 342 dwellings. 2.3% of people identified as LGBTIQ+. The median age was 40.9 years (compared with 38.1 years nationally). There were 174 people (19.3%) aged under 15 years, 153 (17.0%) aged 15 to 29, 435 (48.3%) aged 30 to 64, and 138 (15.3%) aged 65 or older.

People could identify as more than one ethnicity. The results were 90.3% European (Pākehā); 7.0% Māori; 1.0% Pasifika; 4.0% Asian; 1.3% Middle Eastern, Latin American and African New Zealanders (MELAA); and 5.3% other, which includes people giving their ethnicity as "New Zealander". English was spoken by 98.3%, Māori by 1.0%, and other languages by 5.0%. No language could be spoken by 1.3% (e.g. too young to talk). The percentage of people born overseas was 16.0, compared with 28.8% nationally.

Religious affiliations were 34.3% Christian, 0.3% Hindu, 0.3% New Age, and 1.7% other religions. People who answered that they had no religion were 55.7%, and 7.7% of people did not answer the census question.

Of those at least 15 years old, 138 (19.0%) people had a bachelor's or higher degree, 447 (61.6%) had a post-high school certificate or diploma, and 138 (19.0%) people exclusively held high school qualifications. The median income was $51,500, compared with $41,500 nationally. 90 people (12.4%) earned over $100,000 compared to 12.1% nationally. The employment status of those at least 15 was 435 (59.9%) full-time, 111 (15.3%) part-time, and 6 (0.8%) unemployed.

== Education ==
Greendale School is a contributing primary school catering for years 1 to 6. It had a roll of 32 as of July 2026. The school opened in 1872.

== Notable people ==
- Sidney Holland – 25th Prime Minister of New Zealand
