= Selwyn County, New Zealand =

Selwyn County
- County of New Zealand
- 1876–1910
- Area
  - Coordinates: 43.6°S 171.8°E
- History
  - Established: 1876
  - Disestablished: 1910
- Today part of: Canterbury region

Selwyn County was one of the counties of New Zealand on the South Island.

The 1876 boundaries of Selwyn County were Ashley County to the north, from Arthur's Pass, near the source of the Poulter to the mouth of the Waimakariri; along the coast to Lyttelton; then the summit of the Port Hills; then along the summit to Ōmawete / Coopers Knob; then along the stream, Halswell River and Lake Ellesmere / Te Waihora to the coast at Taumutu, near Kaitorete Spit; to the Rakaia and up to its source near Whitcombe Pass and along the summits of the Southern Alps to the starting point.

In 1910-11 Selwyn County was divided into 9 areas, formed from former road boards:

1. Tawera (Malvern & Upper Waimakariri Road Boards);
2. Malvern (Courtenay, South Malvern and East Malvern Road Boards);
3. Selwyn (Rakaia and Lake Coleridge Road Boards);
4. Ellesmere (Ellesmere Road Board);
5. Springs (Springs Road Board);
6. Waimairi (Avon and Riccarton Road Boards);
7. Paparua (Lincoln and Templeton Road Boards and, after 2 months, it added Malvern's West Melton Riding);
8. Halswell (Halswell and Tai Tapu Road Boards and later Paparua's Ladbrooks Riding)
9. Spreydon, which became a borough and merged with Christchurch City.

== See also ==
- List of former territorial authorities in New Zealand
