= Ellesmere County =

Former county of New Zealand

Coordinates: 43°29′18″S 172°06′53″E

- County of New Zealand
- 1911–1989
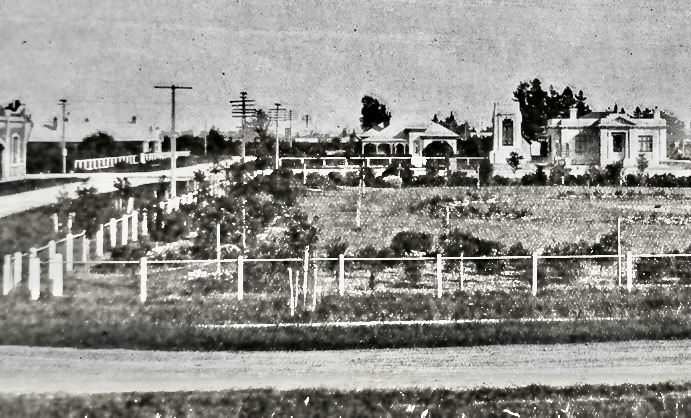
- Ellesmere County offices and war memorial in 1927
- Capital: Leeston
- History
  - Established: 1911
  - Disestablished: 1989
- Today part of: Selwyn District

Ellesmere County was one of the counties of New Zealand in the South Island. It was formed in 1911, after Selwyn County had been sub-divided into nine smaller counties, and covered the same area as the county's Ellesmere Road Board (formed in 1864 as South Rakaia Road Board). The county was made up of three ridings (Irwell, Leeston and Southbridge), with two councillors each. Southbridge Town Board (formed in 1885) and Leeston Town Board (1922) merged with Ellesmere County in 1959. Springs County and the Rakaia riding of Selwyn County were added in 1963. In the 1989 local government reforms, Ellesmere, Malvern and part of Paparua Counties merged to form Selwyn District.

Ellesmere was named after Lord Ellesmere, one of the members of the Canterbury Association.

The northern boundary of Ellesmere County was the Selwyn / Waikirikiri River from its mouth in Lake Ellesmere / Te Waihora to the Main South Line, which was the western to the Rakaia.

A South Rakaia Road Board office, built at Leeston by 1865, was replaced by an Ellesmere County office opened on 24 November 1927 in Italianate style, which was demolished in1969 to make way for a new office, opened on 30 October 1969. Selwyn District used the offices until their move to new offices in Rolleston, after which the building was occupied by Leeston Library until March 2025.

== See also ==
- List of former territorial authorities in New Zealand § Counties
