= Selwyn District =

- Territorial authority district
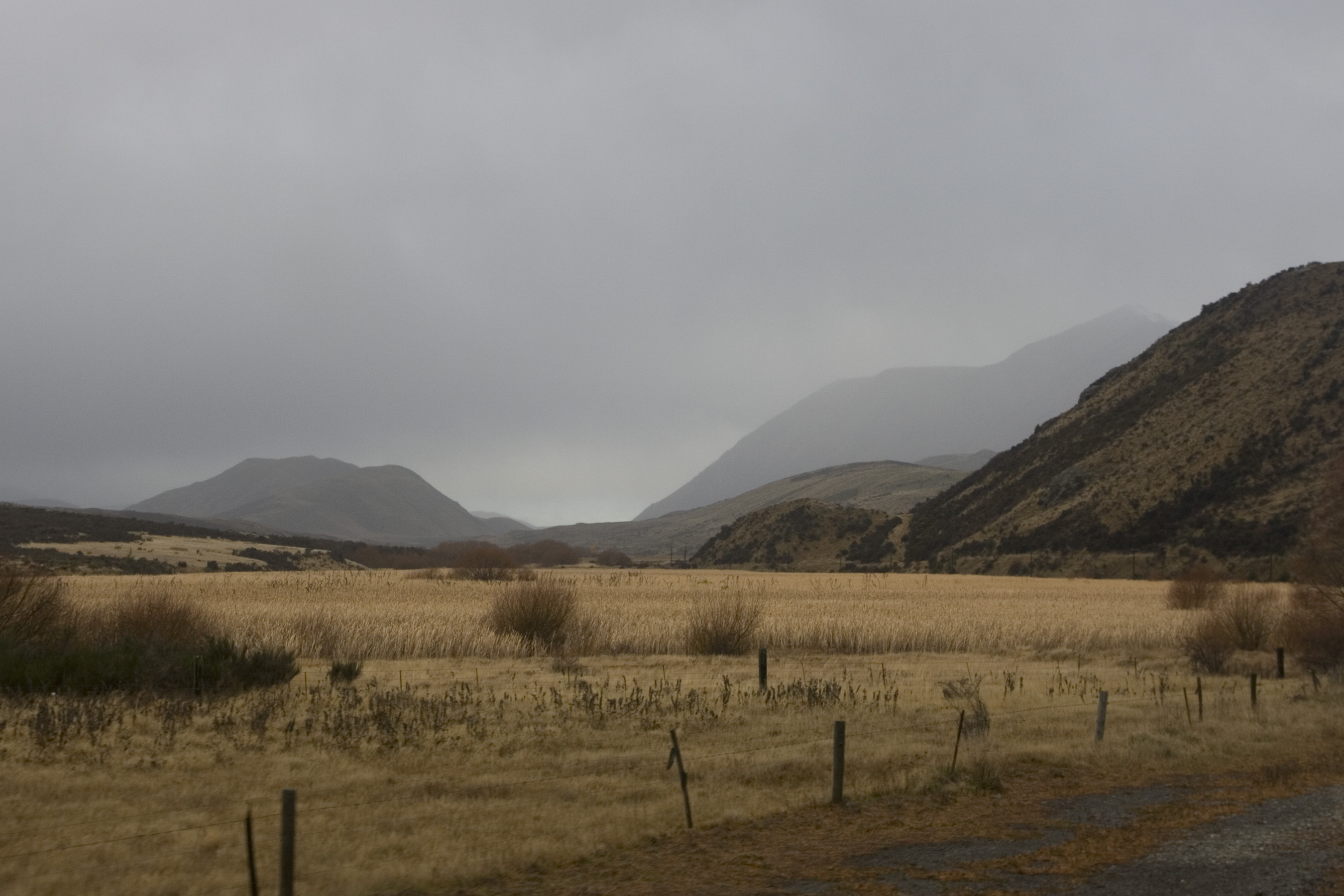
- Photo taken from the TranzAlpine train

- Selwyn district in the South Island
- Coordinates: 43°34′34″S 172°03′36″E
- Country: New Zealand
- Region: Canterbury
- Wards: Ellesmere; Malvern; Selwyn Central; Springs
- Formed: 1989
- Seat: Rolleston

Government
  - Mayor: Lydia Gliddon
  - Territorial authority: Selwyn District Council

Area
  - Total: 6,381.15 km^{2} (2,463.78 sq mi)

Population (June 2025)
  - Total: 87,600
  - Density: 13.7/km^{2} (35.6/sq mi)
- Time zone: UTC+12 (NZST)
  - Summer (DST): UTC+13 (NZDT)
- Postcode(s): Map of postcodes
- Website: www.selwyn.govt.nz

Selwyn District is a predominantly rural district in central Canterbury, on the east coast of New Zealand's South Island. It is named after the Selwyn River / Waikirikiri, which is in turn named after Bishop George Selwyn, the first Anglican bishop of New Zealand who, in 1843 and 1844, travelled the length of the country by horse, foot, boat and canoe, leaving in his wake a sprinkling of locations that now bear his name.

As of the 2023 census, Selwyn District is the fastest-growing territorial authority in New Zealand, with a population increase of 29% over the prior five years.

== History ==
The first inhabitants of the area were the Māori who first settled New Zealand from the Cook and Society Islands about 700 years ago. The predominant Māori tribe today, in Selwyn and most of the rest of the South Island, is Ngāi Tahu, whose local marae (meeting house) is at Taumutu near the exit of Lake Ellesmere (Te Waihora).

In the late 19th century, European (chiefly British) colonists arrived and carved the area up into farmland. This has remained the predominant pattern ever since.

The Selwyn District as a unit of government was formed in the 1989 local government reforms from a legislated merger of the Malvern and Ellesmere counties, along with a portion of Paparua County.

Since this time, the district has enjoyed a stable and prosperous existence. Recent years have seen above-average population growth, making it the fastest-growing local authority in New Zealand in 2013.

Most of Selwyn's new residents have moved from Christchurch to settle on small "lifestyle" farms and in Selwyn's small towns which are within easy commuting distance of the city (e.g. Rolleston, Prebbleton, Lincoln, West Melton, Kirwee). Rolleston is the largest town in Selwyn.

Selwyn District, along with Christchurch and Waimakariri District, experienced some damage in the 2010 Canterbury earthquake. The earthquake epicentre was located just outside Darfield.

== Government ==
The district is governed by an elected mayor and a council of 11 members, elected simultaneously every 3 years. The current mayor is Lydia Gliddon, who was first elected mayor in October 2025.

The mayor is elected on a First Past the Post basis.

The 10 councillors are elected from four wards on a multi-member First Past the Post basis; the total number of votes a candidate receives are considered:

a.) 2 councillors are elected from Ellesmere Ward
b.) 2 councillors are elected from Malvern Ward
c.) 3 councillors are elected from Rolleston Ward
d.) 3 councillors are elected from Springs Ward

The Malvern Ward also has a Community Board, which has power delegated to it by the Council.

The Selwyn district is within the Canterbury Region so Canterbury Regional Council has responsibilities for regional planning, and water, air, discharge and river bed resource consents.

The Selwyn district has powers delegated to it by the Government of New Zealand, and carries out its duties regarding laws such as the Local Government Act 2002 and the Resource Management Act 1991.

In national politics, Selwyn is represented in the Selwyn electorate. Nicola Grigg of the National Party is the incumbent MP.

== Potential amalgamation ==
There has been talks about whether the Selwyn and Waimakariki districts should amalgamate with the Christchurch City Council.

== Geography ==
The Selwyn District lies in central Canterbury, and occupies a central position in the South Island.

Boundaries: On the Canterbury Plains, the Waimakariri River forms the northern boundary; in the hill country the border with the Hurunui District is more arbitrary. The eastern boundary comprises (from north to south) the city of Christchurch, Banks Peninsula, and the South Pacific Ocean. The southern boundary is the Rakaia River, beyond which lies Ashburton District. The western boundary is the main divide of the Southern Alps.

Geographical features: Selwyn District contains within it two distinct regions: the plains and the high country. The plains, where most of the population lives and the majority of activity takes place, form an expanse of low-lying, flat, and comparatively dry grassland. The extreme south-east is dominated by Lake Ellesmere / Te Waihora, an expanse of water surrounded by marshes, formed by the out-flow of the Selwyn River / Waikirikiri. The tributaries of the Selwyn River include the Waianiwaniwa River, the Hororata River and the Hawkins River.

The high country is a sparsely populated region, mainly consisting of hill and mountain ranges and narrow river valleys. Most of the high country is grassland, including some tussocklands; areas of beech forest remain within the Craigieburn Forest Park and the Arthur's Pass National Park.

Climate: The plains have a temperate climate, characterised by warm, dry summers and cool winters. The Southern Alps are responsible for the relatively low rainfall, and also lead to a foehn wind, the "Canterbury Nor'Wester". This strong, hot and dry wind is most common in spring and summer, and on occasion reaches damage-causing strength. In the mountain country of the Southern Alps, conditions are much colder and wetter.

== Demographics ==
Selwyn District covers 6,381.15 km^{2} (2,463.78 sq mi). Its population at the 2023 New Zealand census was 78,144, giving it a population density of 12.2 people per km^{2}.

Selwyn District is the fastest-growing territorial authority in New Zealand. Between the 2018 census and the 2023 census, its population grew by 29.0%; the next-fastest district was Queenstown-Lakes District at 22.1%. Similarly, between the 2013 census and the 2023 Selwyn District's population grew by 75.2%, a greater percentage increase than any other district over that time. Most of this population growth has been in the town of Rolleston. Rolleston's population grew about nine times between 2003 and 2023, and by about three times between 2013 and 2023. Between the 2013 and 2023 censuses, Rolleston grew by 18,800 people, which was more than half of the whole region's growth.

Historical population
Year	Pop.	±% p.a.
2006	33,645	—
2013	44,595	+4.11%
2018	60,561	+6.31%
2023	78,144	+5.23%

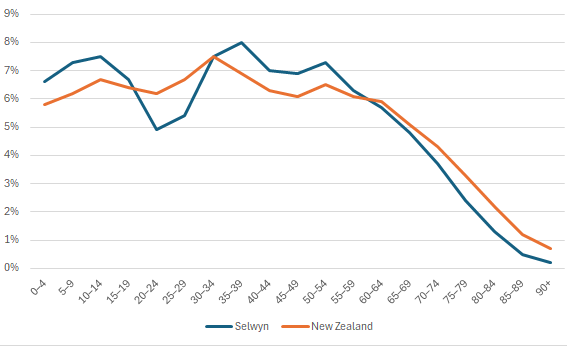
Selwyn District's age distribution compared with New Zealand, as of the 2023 census

Selwyn District had a population of 78,144 in the 2023 New Zealand census, an increase of 17,583 people (29.0%) since the 2018 census, and an increase of 33,549 people (75.2%) since the 2013 census. There were 39,108 males, 38,817 females and 222 people of other genders in 27,153 dwellings. 2.7% of people identified as LGBTIQ+. The median age was 37.6 years (compared with 38.1 years nationally). There were 16,659 people (21.3%) aged under 15 years, 13,320 (17.0%) aged 15 to 29, 38,031 (48.7%) aged 30 to 64, and 10,131 (13.0%) aged 65 or older.

People could identify as more than one ethnicity. The results were 84.1% European (Pākehā); 9.0% Māori; 2.4% Pasifika; 11.4% Asian; 1.5% Middle Eastern, Latin American and African New Zealanders (MELAA); and 3.0% other, which includes people giving their ethnicity as "New Zealander". English was spoken by 96.5%, Māori language by 1.5%, Samoan by 0.4% and other languages by 12.7%. No language could be spoken by 2.4% (e.g. too young to talk). New Zealand Sign Language was known by 0.5%. The percentage of people born overseas was 23.8, compared with 28.8% nationally.

Religious affiliations were 30.4% Christian, 1.6% Hindu, 0.7% Islam, 0.2% Māori religious beliefs, 0.7% Buddhist, 0.3% New Age, and 2.1% other religions. People who answered that they had no religion were 57.7%, and 6.4% of people did not answer the census question.

Of those at least 15 years old, 12,147 (19.8%) people had a bachelor's or higher degree, 33,984 (55.3%) had a post-high school certificate or diploma, and 11,685 (19.0%) people exclusively held high school qualifications. The median income was $51,900, compared with $41,500 nationally. 9,423 people (15.3%) earned over $100,000 compared to 12.1% nationally. The employment status of those at least 15 was that 35,805 (58.2%) people were employed full-time, 9,300 (15.1%) were part-time, and 1,056 (1.7%) were unemployed.

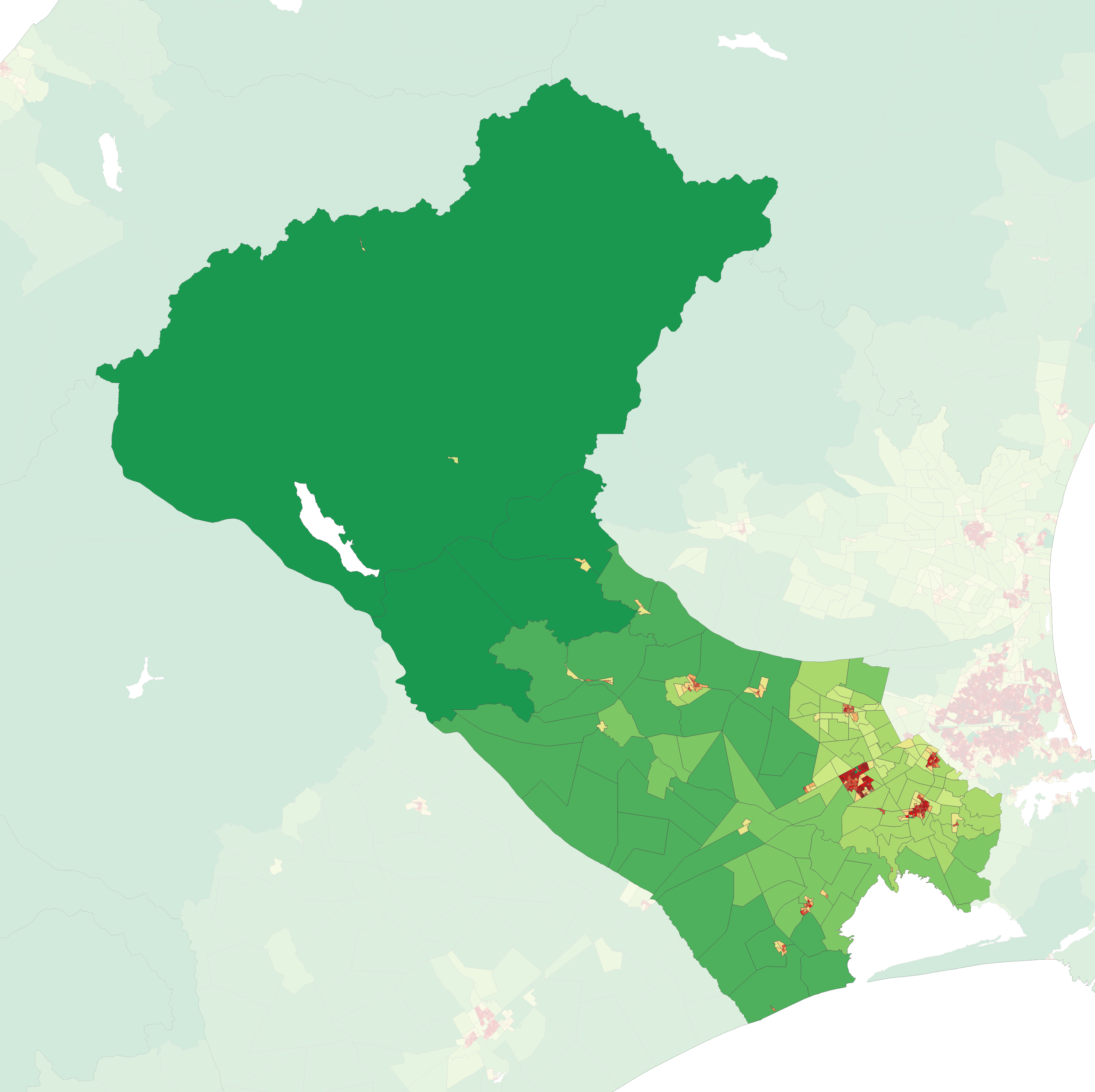
Population density in the 2023 census

Individual wards (2018 boundaries)
Name	Area (km^{2})	Population	Density (per km^{2})	Dwellings	Median age	Median income
Malvern Ward	4,982.77	15,120	3.0	5,748	43.9 years	$49,400
Rolleston Ward	35.08	28,857	822.6	9,393	33.7 years	$55,400
Ellesmere Ward	1,165.89	11,796	10.1	4,299	38.7 years	$47,000
Springs Ward	197.40	22,371	113.3	7,713	40.2 years	$51,500
New Zealand					38.1 years	$41,500

=== Urban areas ===
The Selwyn District has six towns with a population over 1,000. Together they are home to 69.3% of the district's population.

Urban area	Population (June 2025)	% of district
Rolleston	34,100	38.9%
Lincoln	12,100	13.8%
Prebbleton	5,750	6.6%
Darfield	3,590	4.1%
West Melton	2,700	3.1%
Leeston	2,470	2.8%

== Economy ==
The Selwyn District has a modelled gross domestic product (GDP) of $3,617 million in the year to March 2024, 0.9% of New Zealand's national GDP. The GDP per capita is $42,699, ranking it 57th out of 66 territorial authorities. Major industries include dairy cattle farming; dairy product manufacturing; central government administration and defence; and education and training.

Much of the district's economy is based around farming. Most of this is pastoral: beef cattle and sheep in drier areas, and dairy and deer farming in wetter areas. Some horsebreeding is also done. There is also a substantial amount of cropping; wheat and barley are grown on the plains, along with smaller amounts of grapes and other fruit, vegetables, mushrooms and flowers.

Selwyn District experienced the strongest economic growth of any district in New Zealand in 2012, with employment growing by 9.5%, compared to the national average of 1%. 1,200 new jobs were created in the district in 2012.

The services in the small towns primarily serve the surrounding community. The major exception is the town of Lincoln, home to a University and a number of Crown Research Institutes and other organisations concerned with scientific research. Rolleston is also home to IZONE – New Zealand's largest business park.

The Selwyn District Council owns 11% shareholding in Orion, the local electricity distribution company.
