= Paparua =

Rural area of Christchurch, New Zealand

- Interactive map of Paparua
- Coordinates: 43.529°S 172.456°E
- Country: New Zealand
- Region: Canterbury
- Territorial authority: Christchurch City
- Ward: Hornby
- Community: Waipuna Halswell-Hornby-Riccarton
- Electorates: Wigram; Te Tai Tonga (Māori)

Government
  - Territorial Authority: Christchurch City Council
  - Regional council: Environment Canterbury
  - Mayor of Christchurch: Phil Mauger
  - Wigram MP: Dominik Yanzick
  - Te Tai Tonga MP: Mananui Ramsden

Area
  - Total: 23.34 km^{2} (9.01 sq mi)

Population (June 2025)
  - Total: 1,060
  - Density: 45.4/km^{2} (118/sq mi)

Paparua is a rural area west of the New Zealand city of Christchurch. It contains both Christchurch Men's Prison (often called Paparua Prison) and Christchurch Women's Prison. Quarries and heavy industry dominate in the north of the area. Euromarque Motorsport Park is on the eastern side.

Paparua County was formed in 1911. It amalgamated with Halswell County in 1968, and was abolished in the 1989 New Zealand local government reforms with its territory divided between Christchurch City and Selwyn District.

The western boundary of Paparua Statistical Area (Chattertons Road and Dawsons Road) forms the boundary between Christchurch and Selwyn.

== Demographics ==
Paparua statistical area covers 23.34 km^{2} (9.01 sq mi). It had an estimated population of 1,060 as of June 2025, with a population density of 45.4 people per km^{2}.

Historical population
Year	Pop.	±% p.a.
2006	936	—
2013	801	−2.20%
2018	1,002	+4.58%
2023	1,038	+0.71%

Paparua had a population of 1,038 in the 2023 New Zealand census, an increase of 36 people (3.6%) since the 2018 census, and an increase of 237 people (29.6%) since the 2013 census. There were 756 males, 276 females, and 6 people of other genders in 114 dwellings. 4.0% of people identified as LGBTIQ+. The median age was 37.3 years (compared with 38.1 years nationally). There were 45 people (4.3%) aged under 15 years, 240 (23.1%) aged 15 to 29, 681 (65.6%) aged 30 to 64, and 69 (6.6%) aged 65 or older.

People could identify as more than one ethnicity. The results were 70.8% European (Pākehā); 34.1% Māori; 6.4% Pasifika; 5.5% Asian; 1.4% Middle Eastern, Latin American and African New Zealanders (MELAA); and 3.5% other, which includes people giving their ethnicity as "New Zealander". English was spoken by 96.8%, Māori by 9.8%, Samoan by 1.7%, and other languages by 7.2%. No language could be spoken by 0.9% (e.g. too young to talk). New Zealand Sign Language was known by 2.3%. The percentage of people born overseas was 11.8, compared with 28.8% nationally.

Religious affiliations were 20.8% Christian, 1.7% Hindu, 0.9% Islam, 3.5% Māori religious beliefs, 1.2% Buddhist, 1.4% New Age, and 2.9% other religions. People who answered that they had no religion were 61.8%, and 5.8% of people did not answer the census question.

Of those at least 15 years old, 66 (6.6%) people had a bachelor's or higher degree, 561 (56.5%) had a post-high school certificate or diploma, and 366 (36.9%) people exclusively held high school qualifications. The median income was $10,700, compared with $41,500 nationally. 45 people (4.5%) earned over $100,000 compared to 12.1% nationally. The employment status of those at least 15 was 237 (23.9%) full-time, 63 (6.3%) part-time, and 45 (4.5%) unemployed.
