= Rakaia Bridge =

Bridge in Canterbury, New Zealand

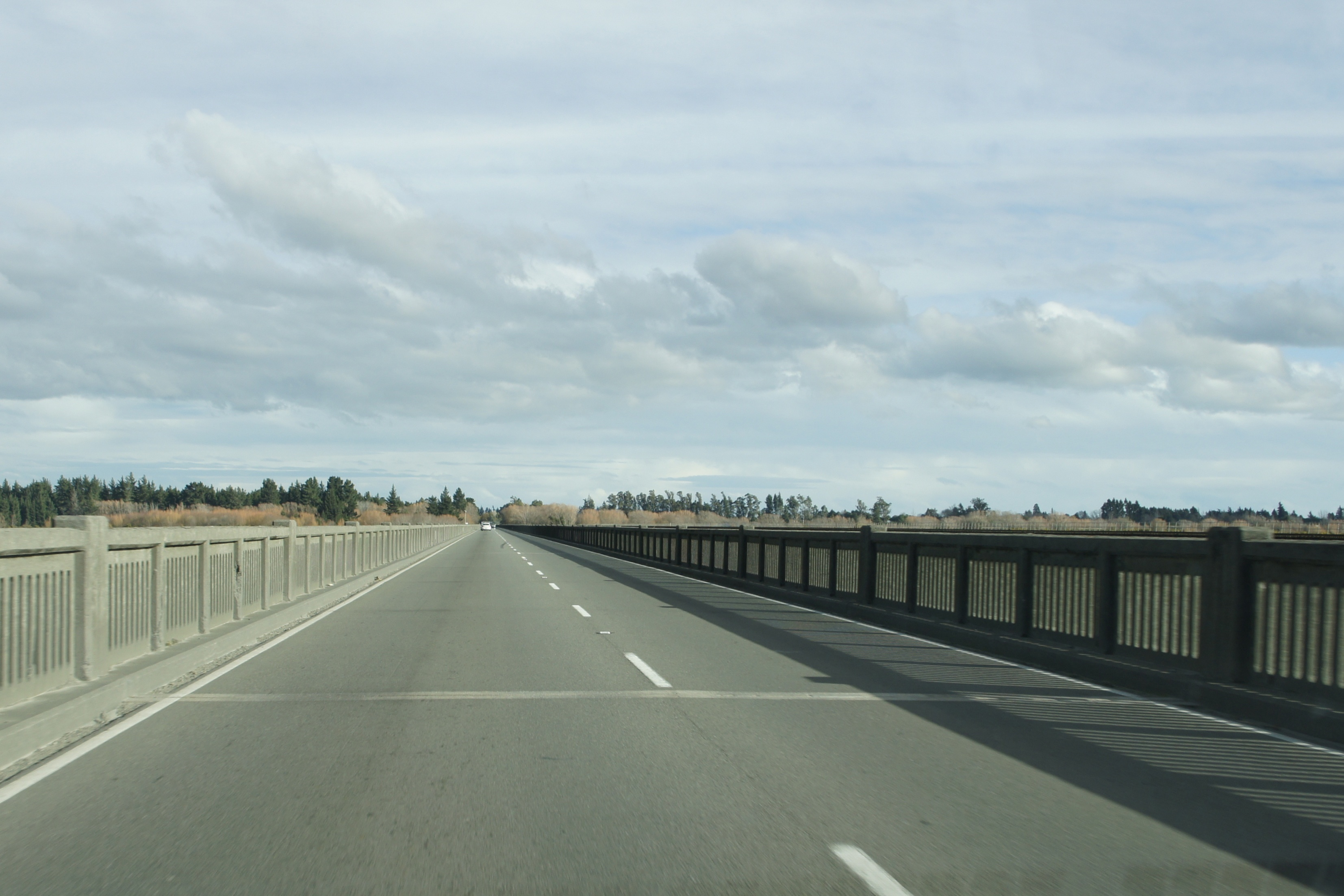
- Rakaia Bridge (State Highway 1) is New Zealand's longest road bridge
- Coordinates: 43.7440°S 172.0378°E
- Carries: road traffic
- Crosses: Rakaia River
- Locale: Canterbury
- Other name: Rakaia Road Bridge
- Named for: Māori name of the river
- Owner: NZ Transport Agency

Characteristics
- Design: simply supported reinforced concrete spans
- Material: Concrete
- Total length: 1,756 m (5,762 ft)
- Width: 6.2 m (20.5 ft)
- No. of spans: 144
- No. of lanes: Two (one in each direction)

History
- Designer: Public Works Department
- Constructed by: Rope Construction
- Construction start: March 1937
- Inaugurated: 25 March 1939

Statistics
- Daily traffic: 13,652 (2019)

Location
- Interactive map of Rakaia Bridge

The Rakaia Bridge is New Zealand's longest road bridge and crosses the Rakaia River, one of Canterbury's large braided rivers. The present bridge was opened in 1939 and replaced an earlier combined road and rail bridge from 1873. The present road bridge is just downstream from the rail bridge and forms part of State Highway 1.

== First bridge ==
The Canterbury Provincial Council decided in April 1864 to commence building the railway from Christchurch to Timaru. An engineer was engaged to undertake the design for the bridge over the Rakaia River and to proceed with construction immediately. Construction of the railway commenced, but there were problems with funding and the Rakaia Bridge was not started. By the time the line reached Selwyn in October 1867, 35 kilometres (22 mi) from central Christchurch and just across the Selwyn River, the provincial government was so short of finances that construction was temporarily halted. The provincial government called for tenders for a road bridge over the Rakaia River and awarded the contract on 17 October 1869 to William White, who had earlier built a bridge over the Waimakariri River. White was to construct a timber bridge with 96 spans of 12.2 metres (40 ft) each. Much of the timber was cut in Little River and barged across Lake Forsyth and Lake Ellesmere / Te Waihora. Worked ceased in the following year when it was decided to make the bridge a combined one for both road and rail traffic. A second contract was tendered and again won by William White.

The Christchurch engineer William Bayley Bray (1812–1885) suggested that the spans could be reduced to 6.1 metres (20 ft), to which the provincial council agreed. John Blackett peer reviewed the plans on behalf of central government and recommended transverse joists and longitudinal planking. The contractor instead recommended transverse planking directly onto the girders with a 127 millimetres (5.0 in) asphalt cover, to which the provincial engineer agreed. The bridge was completed on 16 April 1873, but without the handrail being in place yet. The formal opening of the bridge was on 29 May 1873 by the superintendent of the Canterbury Province, William Rolleston. All but four of the provincial councillors were present, plus a number of central government ministers and members of parliament, including William Reynolds (Commissioner of Customs), John Bathgate (Minister of Justice), Edward Stafford, William Montgomery, William Sefton Moorhouse, Leslie Lee, Hugh Murray-Aynsley, Walter Kennaway, Col De Renzie Brett, Henry Tancred, and Ernest Gray. The bridge cost NZ£36,196, was 17 feet 3 inches (5.26 m) wide, and 4,480 feet (1,370 m) long. The rail was put down in broad gauge, 5 feet 3 inches (1,600 mm), as was the initial standard gauge in Canterbury.

The results of the modified construction were devastating, and the planking flexed under the traffic load and dislodged the asphalt. A Royal Commission found fault with all parties but laid most blame with the provincial engineer, and the bridge deck had to be rebuilt. On this new deck, the rails were reduced to the New Zealand's uniform gauge of 3 feet 6 inches (1,070 mm). Just before reconstruction was complete, a major flood washed out both end of the bridge. The bridge was subsequently lengthened (the portions that washed out were bunds that had been built within the braided riverbed) to 1,836 metres (6,024 ft) length with 224 spans of the two lengths referred to above. This bridge was used until March 1939. The formal owner of the first bridge was the Railway Department.

== Current bridge ==
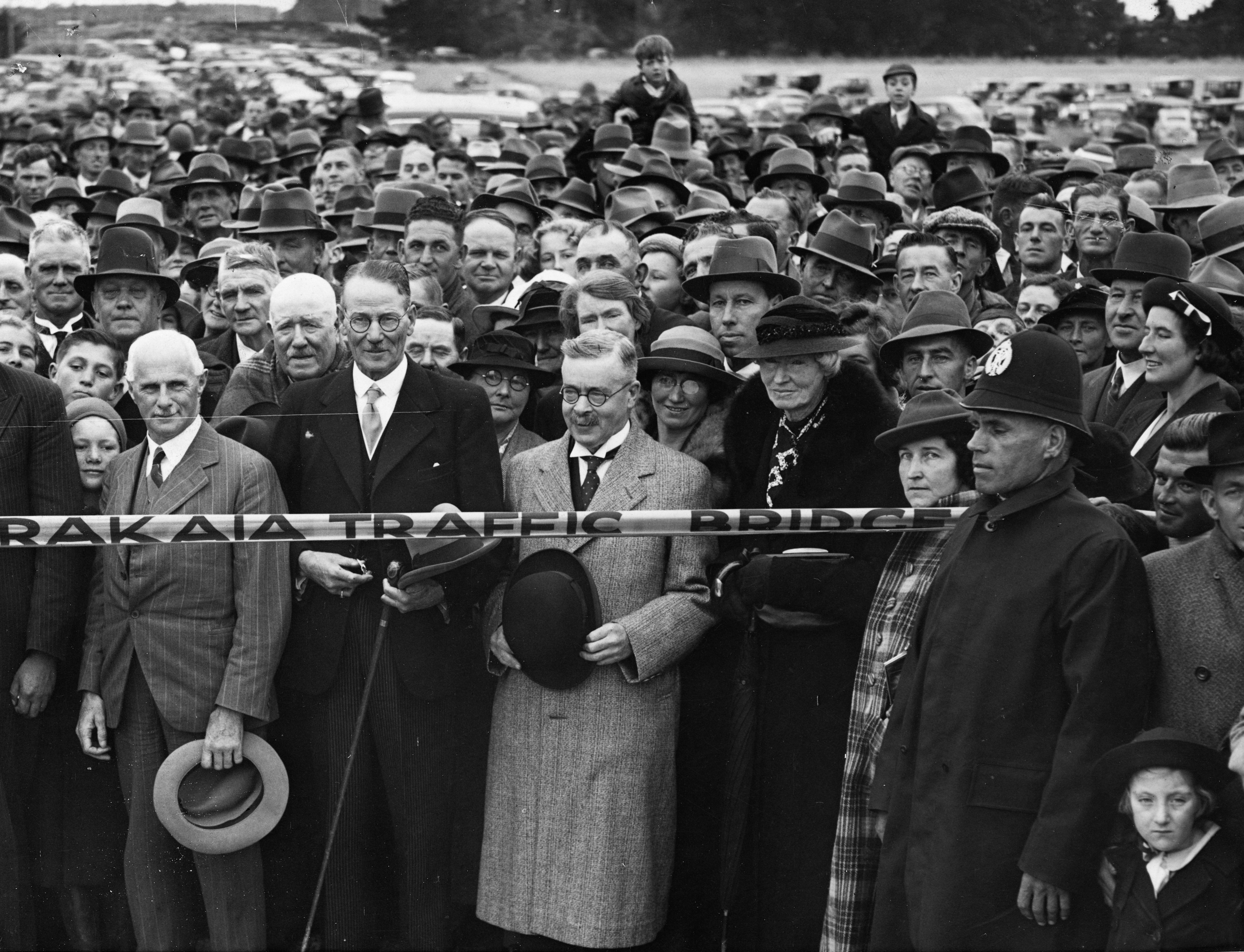
Minister of Public Works, Bob Semple, about to open the bridge

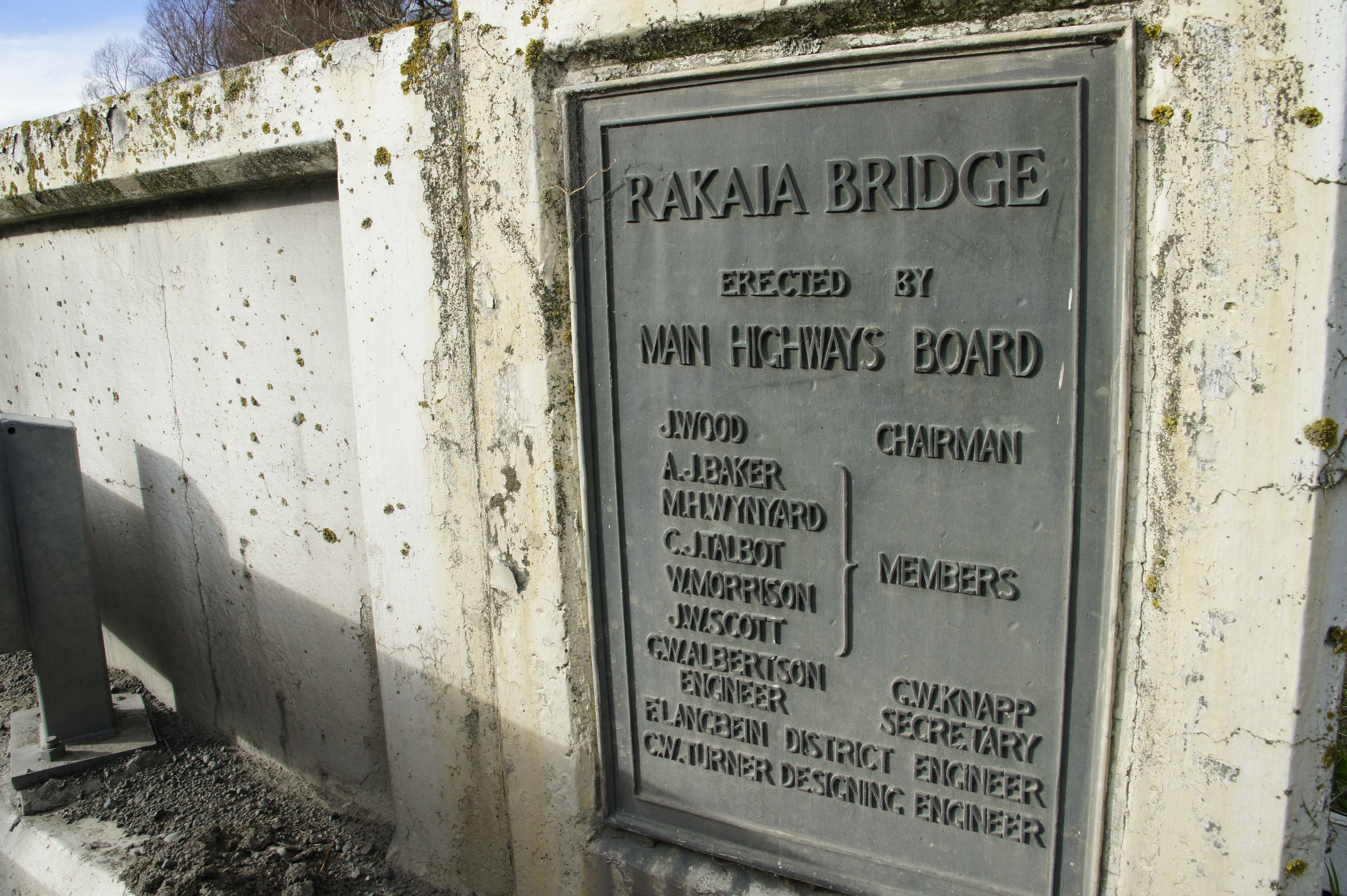
Plaque from the 1939 opening

In June 1931, the Railway Department informed the Main Highways Board that it would increase the charges for the Rakaia Bridge. This resulted in the Main Highways Board to start investigations for a new exclusive road bridge, which finished in March 1933. Some months later, negotiations were started for the Main Highways Board to buy the existing bridge for it to become an exclusive road bridge. Meanwhile, the Railway Department desired a new bridge as trains were getting heavier.

In the end, the decision was made to build a new road bridge from reinforced concrete next to the existing bridge, and a railway bridge a short distance upstream. One of the reasons for a new bridge was that the old one was considered too narrow. It regularly happened that two large vehicles would meet on the bridge and one had to back off the bridge again as they could not pass one another; not necessarily an easy or quick manoeuvre on a bridge about one mile long. On other occasions, traffic was stuck behind a flock of sheep for as much as an hour. The Main Highways Board proposed to recover some 12% of the construction cost from three adjacent counties: Ashburton, and Ellesmere. In the end, the bridge was paid for from the Main Highway Fund in its entirety and the counties were relieved of their annual contribution towards the upkeep of the bridge.

After construction having started in March 1937, the current bridge was opened on 25 March 1939 by the Minister of Public Works, Bob Semple. Other speakers were the H. C. Harley of the Canterbury Automobile Association, whose organisation had organised the opening ceremony, and the local member of parliament, Arthur Grigg.

The new bridge was designed by the Public Works Department under Fritz Langbein. The contractor was Rope Construction Company. It has 144 spans of 40 feet (12 m), with a total length of 5,762 feet (1,756 m).

The old Rakaia Bridge was last used by the Christchurch – Invercargill Express at 9.56 am on 12 December 1939. A mixed train coming from Ashburton was the first to pass over the new railway bridge at 12.30 pm on the same day; the new bridge was put into service without any ceremony. At 5,720 feet (1,740 m), it is New Zealand's longest rail bridge.
