= Mojo Mathers =

New Zealand politician (born 1966)

Mojo Mathers MNZM
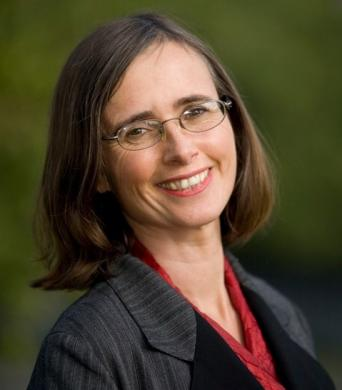

Member of the New Zealand Parliament for Green party list
- In office 10 December 2011 – 23 September 2017

Personal details
- Born: Mojo Celeste Minrod; 23 November 1966 (age 59) London, United Kingdom
- Party: Green
- Relations: H. L. A. Hart (grandfather) Jenifer Hart (grandmother)
- Children: 3

Mojo Celeste Mathers MNZM (née Minrod, born 23 November 1966) is a New Zealand politician and a former Member of Parliament (MP) for the Green Party. She became known through her involvement with the Malvern Hills Protection Society and helped prevent the Central Plains Water Trust's proposal to build a large irrigation dam in Coalgate. She was a senior policy advisor to the Green Party between 2006 and 2011. Mathers was elected to the 50th term of Parliament in 2011, becoming the country's first deaf Member of Parliament.

== Early life and career ==
Mathers was born in London, UK in 1966. Her parents named her after the Muddy Waters' 1957 version of the song "Got My Mojo Working". Her grandfather was the British legal philosopher H. L. A. Hart and her grandmother Jenifer Hart a British senior public servant, author and daughter of prominent electoral reformer Sir John Fischer Williams.

Mathers was born profoundly deaf "after oxygen was cut to her as newborn baby during a difficult birth". She is not, however, mute, and is a lipreader. She only began to make significant use of Sign Language in the late 2000s (saying she had "found it very useful for some situations"), preferring to lipread and communicate orally before that.

She has three children.

Moving to New Zealand, Mathers worked for the Green Party as a senior policy advisor between 2006 and 2011. In her personal life, she "strive[s] to reduce [her] personal impact on the environment by being vegetarian, supporting GE free, non-toxic, organic, fair trade and local, [and] using public transport".

Mathers has an Honours degree in mathematics and a master's degree in Conservation Forestry. Between 2001 and 2006, she was the joint owner of a "small business offering forestry management services". She worked for the Green Party as a senior policy advisor between 2006 and 2011.

== Political career ==
Her interest in political environmentalism began when she settled in Coalgate, a village in Canterbury region in New Zealand. She was the spokeswoman for the local community's opposition to the building of a large dam, proposed by the Central Plains Water Trust as part of a broader project to "convert the local area into intensive dairy farming" from 2001 to 2004. She was a founding member of the Malvern Hills Protection Society which succeeded in halting the dam project.

Mathers first stood for Parliament in the 2005 election in the Rakaia electorate, when she was ranked 16th on the Green Party list, winning 1,631 votes. In 2008 she was ranked 13th and contested Christchurch East, winning 1,843 votes. On neither occasion was she elected.

In 2009, Mathers wrote submissions opposing clauses of the Resource Management (Simplifying and Streamlining) Amendment Bill 2009 and arguing for the "setting of minimum environmental standards" across the country. She also wrote in opposition to the Climate Change Response (Moderated Emissions Trading) Amendment Bill 2009, arguing it "would substantially weaken the existing emissions trading scheme, reducing incentives to reduce emissions while providing large ongoing subsidies to climate polluters at enormous cost to the taxpayer".

New Zealand Parliament
Years	Term	Electorate	List	Party
2011–2014	50th	List	14	Green
2014–2017	51st	List	9	Green

In 2011, Mathers described her areas of policy interest as "rural issues, biodiversity, forestry and water, as well as animal welfare, disability and women's rights".

At the 2011 general election, she was number 14 on the list, and stood again in Christchurch East. She finished third in her constituency, with 4.5% of the electorate vote, but was elected as a list MP. She suggested that "having sign language in Parliament" might help "enable the wider deaf community to access political debate". New Zealand Sign Language is already an official language of New Zealand but, unlike English and Māori, it was not represented in Parliament.

As an MP, Mathers was provided, after some delay, with an electronic note-keeping assistant. Speaker Lockwood Smith also said he "planned to develop a captioning service to make proceedings of the House more accessible to the hearing impaired" among the general public.

During her two terms in parliament she held various spokesperson roles including Animal Welfare, Civil Defence, Commerce and Consumer Affairs, Disability Issues, Food and Natural Health. She served on the Commerce, Government Administration and Local Government and Environment select committees. In November 2015, a member's bill in Mathers' name which would establish an adjudicator to resolve disputes between supermarkets and suppliers was drawn. The bill was defeated at its first reading with the Green Party, Labour Party, NZ First and the Māori Party voting in support and the National Party, Act and United Future opposed.

Mathers lost her seat at the 2017 general election, despite no change in her list ranking, because the Green Party received a smaller share of the party vote.

== Life after politics ==
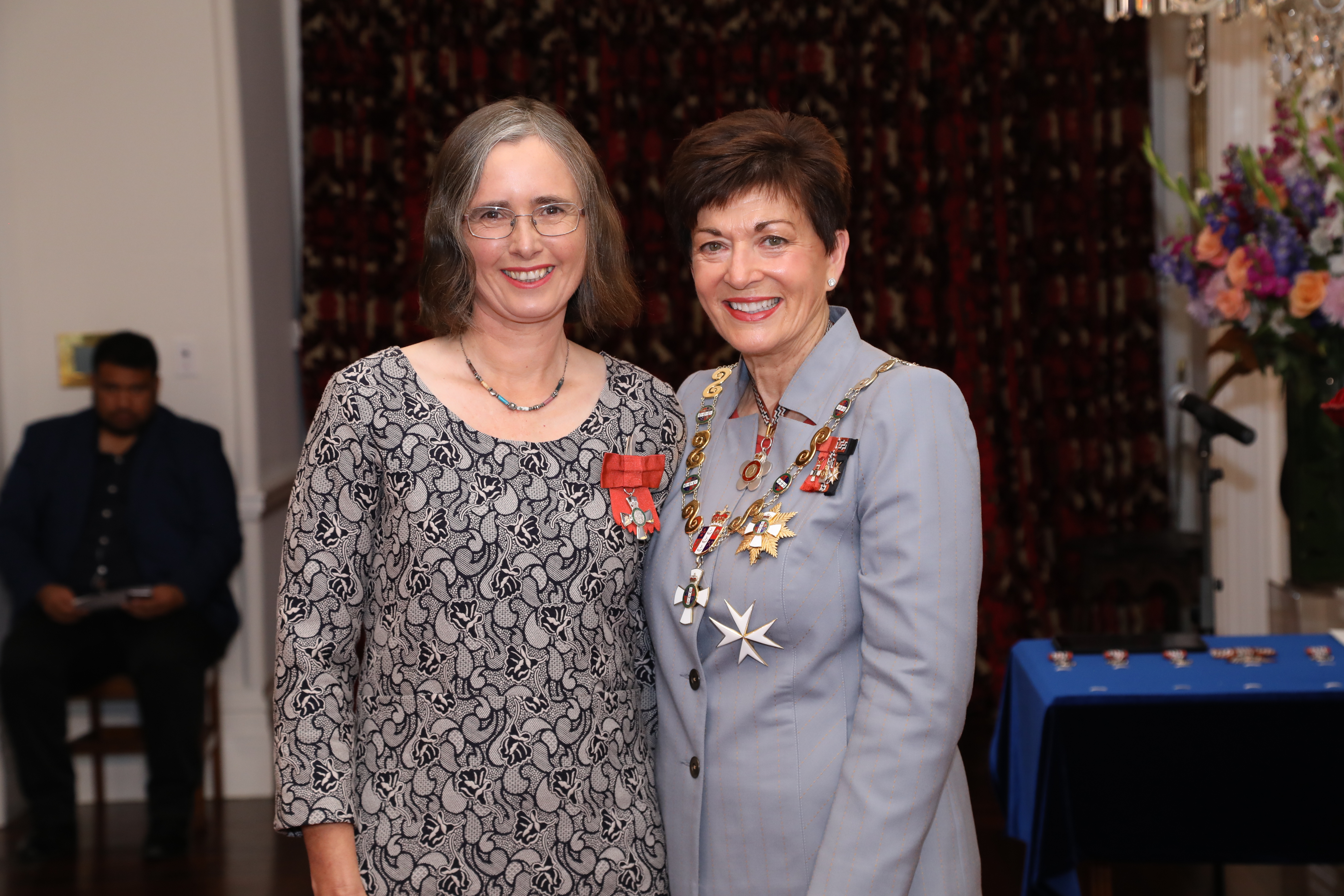
Mathers (left) in 2019, after her investiture as a Member of the New Zealand Order of Merit by the governor-general, Dame Patsy Reddy

In 2019 Mathers started working as a policy advisor for Disabled Person's Assembly of New Zealand (DPA). She was appointed chief executive of the DPA in 2023.

== Honour ==
In the 2019 New Year Honours, Mathers was appointed a Member of the New Zealand Order of Merit, for services to people with disabilities.
