= Dunsandel =

Town in Canterbury, New Zealand

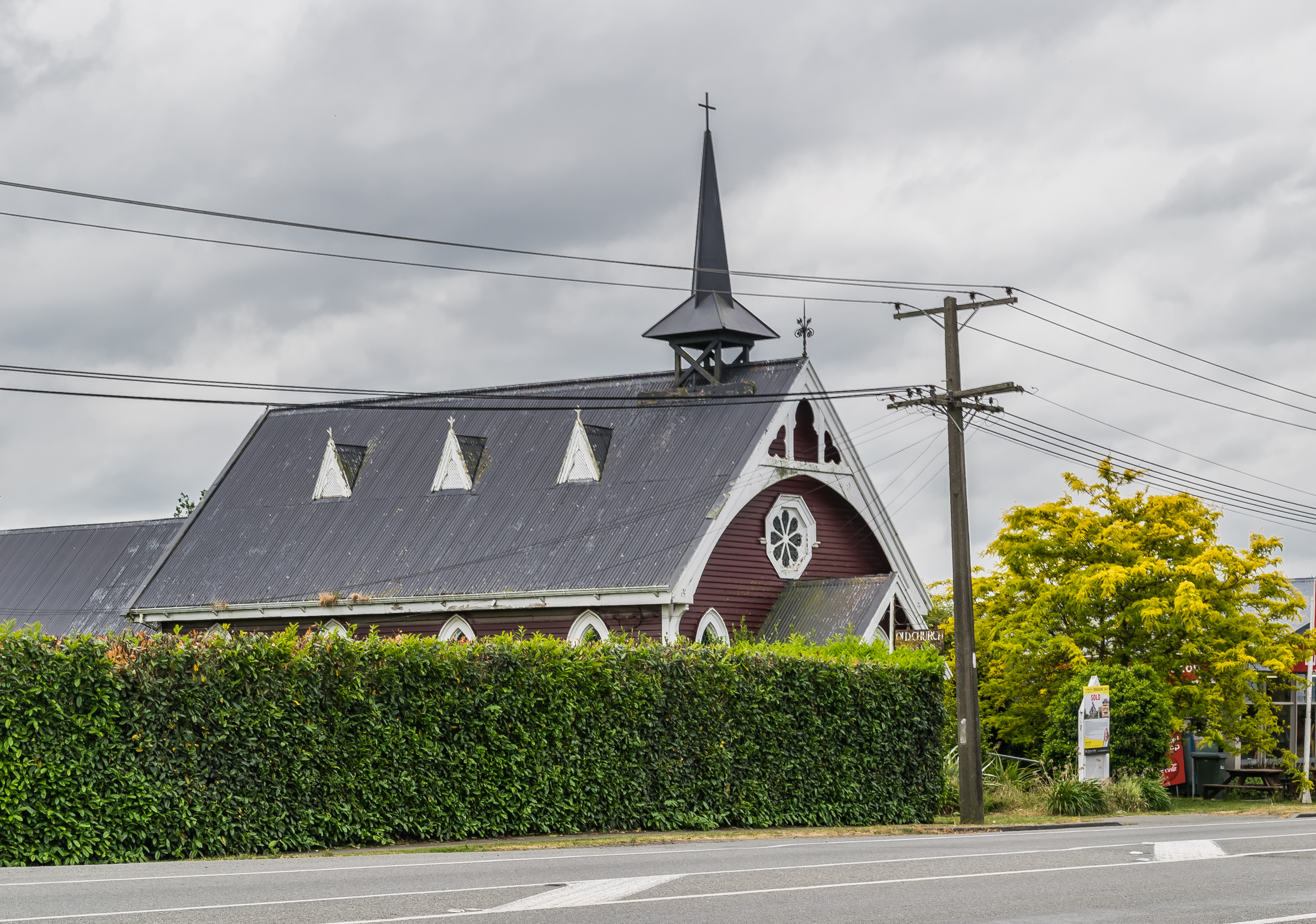
- Dunsandel Methodist Church
- Interactive map of Dunsandel
- Coordinates: 43°39′38″S 172°11′34″E
- Country: New Zealand
- Region: Canterbury region
- District: Selwyn District
- Ward: Ellesmere
- Electorates: Selwyn; Te Tai Tonga (Māori)

Government
  - Territorial authority: Selwyn District Council
  - Regional council: Environment Canterbury
  - Mayor of Selwyn: Lydia Gliddon
  - Selwyn MP: Nicola Grigg
  - Te Tai Tonga MP: Mananui Ramsden

Area
  - Total: 1.94 km^{2} (0.75 sq mi)

Population (June 2025)
  - Total: 490
  - Density: 250/km^{2} (650/sq mi)

Dunsandel is a small rural town in the Canterbury region of the South Island, New Zealand. The town is located on the Canterbury Plains just south of the Selwyn River / Waikirikiri and about 40 km south of Christchurch. Dunsandel is a junction town on SH1, halfway between Christchurch and Ashburton, with roads leading to Leeston, Southbridge and Hororata. The town provides an important refreshment stop for main road travellers with eateries and coffee shops, as well as acting as a support town for the rural hinterland.

The town was established to serve the local farming community which includes dairy, sheep and cropping and continues providing veterinary, transport and vehicle repair services. It was named after Dunsandle Castle, the home of Robert Daly, who had owned the land on which the town as established. It has one primary school for approximately 150 children. The town is the home to the Dunsandel Cricket Club. The club's 'A' team has a reputation as one of the premier teams in the Ellesmere district.

== Demographics ==
Dunsandel is described by Statistics New Zealand as a rural settlement, and covers 1.94 km^{2} (0.75 sq mi). It had an estimated population of 490 as of June 2025, with a population density of 253 people per km^{2}. It is part of the Bankside statistical area.

Historical population for Dunsandel
Year	Pop.	±% p.a.
2006	399	—
2013	441	+1.44%
2018	435	−0.27%
2023	411	−1.13%

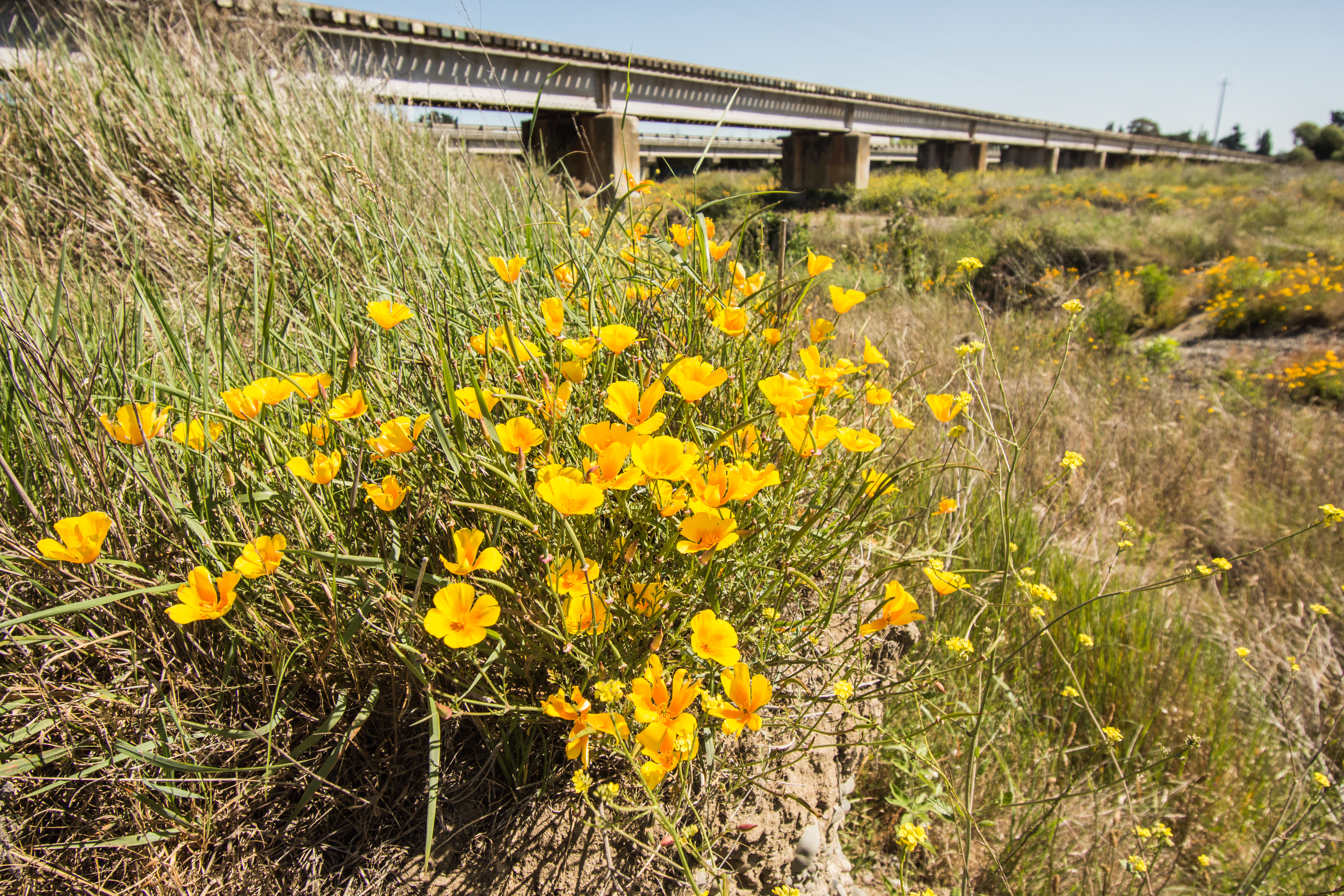
Selwyn Bridge

Dunsandel had a population of 411 in the 2023 New Zealand census, a decrease of 24 people (−5.5%) since the 2018 census, and a decrease of 30 people (−6.8%) since the 2013 census. There were 207 males and 204 females in 165 dwellings. 4.4% of people identified as LGBTIQ+. The median age was 41.7 years (compared with 38.1 years nationally). There were 84 people (20.4%) aged under 15 years, 60 (14.6%) aged 15 to 29, 207 (50.4%) aged 30 to 64, and 60 (14.6%) aged 65 or older.

People could identify as more than one ethnicity. The results were 89.8% European (Pākehā), 10.9% Māori, 2.2% Pasifika, 5.8% Asian, and 4.4% other, which includes people giving their ethnicity as "New Zealander". English was spoken by 97.1%, Māori by 2.9%, Samoan by 0.7%, and other languages by 6.6%. No language could be spoken by 2.9% (e.g. too young to talk). The percentage of people born overseas was 17.5, compared with 28.8% nationally.

Religious affiliations were 24.1% Christian, 0.7% Buddhist, 0.7% New Age, and 2.2% other religions. People who answered that they had no religion were 63.5%, and 8.0% of people did not answer the census question.

Of those at least 15 years old, 45 (13.8%) people had a bachelor's or higher degree, 207 (63.3%) had a post-high school certificate or diploma, and 81 (24.8%) people exclusively held high school qualifications. The median income was $48,100, compared with $41,500 nationally. 30 people (9.2%) earned over $100,000 compared to 12.1% nationally. The employment status of those at least 15 was 186 (56.9%) full-time, 39 (11.9%) part-time, and 6 (1.8%) unemployed.

=== Bankside ===
The Bankside statistical area, which also includes Selwyn, covers 359.56 km^{2} (138.83 sq mi). It had an estimated population of 1,900 as of June 2025, with a population density of 5.3 people per km^{2}.

Historical population for Bankside
Year	Pop.	±% p.a.
2006	1,365	—
2013	1,605	+2.34%
2018	1,656	+0.63%
2023	1,647	−0.11%

Bankside had a population of 1,647 in the 2023 New Zealand census, a decrease of 9 people (−0.5%) since the 2018 census, and an increase of 42 people (2.6%) since the 2013 census. There were 885 males and 762 females in 639 dwellings. 3.3% of people identified as LGBTIQ+. The median age was 35.3 years (compared with 38.1 years nationally). There were 372 people (22.6%) aged under 15 years, 291 (17.7%) aged 15 to 29, 822 (49.9%) aged 30 to 64, and 162 (9.8%) aged 65 or older.

People could identify as more than one ethnicity. The results were 71.4% European (Pākehā); 9.5% Māori; 3.3% Pasifika; 20.4% Asian; 3.1% Middle Eastern, Latin American and African New Zealanders (MELAA); and 3.1% other, which includes people giving their ethnicity as "New Zealander". English was spoken by 96.5%, Māori by 1.6%, Samoan by 0.2%, and other languages by 16.6%. No language could be spoken by 2.4% (e.g. too young to talk). New Zealand Sign Language was known by 0.2%. The percentage of people born overseas was 30.1, compared with 28.8% nationally.

Religious affiliations were 33.2% Christian, 2.7% Hindu, 0.2% Islam, 0.2% Māori religious beliefs, 1.3% Buddhist, 0.7% New Age, and 2.2% other religions. People who answered that they had no religion were 52.3%, and 7.5% of people did not answer the census question.

Of those at least 15 years old, 267 (20.9%) people had a bachelor's or higher degree, 681 (53.4%) had a post-high school certificate or diploma, and 333 (26.1%) people exclusively held high school qualifications. The median income was $53,000, compared with $41,500 nationally. 114 people (8.9%) earned over $100,000 compared to 12.1% nationally. The employment status of those at least 15 was 801 (62.8%) full-time, 171 (13.4%) part-time, and 21 (1.6%) unemployed.

== Education ==
Dunsandel School is a contributing primary school catering for years 1 to 6. It had a roll of 128 as of July 2026. The school opened in 1879. Selwyn and Upper Selwyn schools merged into Dunsandel School in 1936.
