= Malvern Hills Protection Society =

New Zealand environmental group

The Malvern Hills Protection Society (MHPS) is a grassroots environmental group seeking to prevent the construction of a new dam in the Canterbury region of New Zealand.

It was formed as an incorporated society by the Dam Action Group and their aim is to "promote the conservation, protection and enhancement of the historical, cultural, ecological, environmental and community values of the Malvern Hills District". The Dam Action Group was formed to prevent the construction of an earth dam which would flood part of the Waianiwaniwa River catchment area. Mojo Mathers is among the Society's founding members.

The dam is a proposal by the Central Plains Water Trust, which was established by the Christchurch City and Selwyn District Councils, as a means of providing irrigation for parts of the Canterbury Plains
