= Fritz Langbein =

New Zealand civil engineer

Fritz Langbein (15 March 1891 – 28 April 1967) was a New Zealand civil engineer, engineering administrator and company director.

Langbein was born on 15 March 1891 in Nelson, the son of Frederick John Langbein, a commercial traveller and farmer, and his wife, Mary Ross. He was educated at Nelson College from 1904 to 1908. During World War I, Langbein served with the New Zealand Tunnelling Company of the New Zealand Expeditionary Force on the Western Front in France.

Langbein was responsible for the design of many highway bridges in New Zealand, including the Rakaia Bridge.
