= Hawkins River =

River in Canterbury Region, New Zealand

Coordinates: 43°37′S 172°08′E

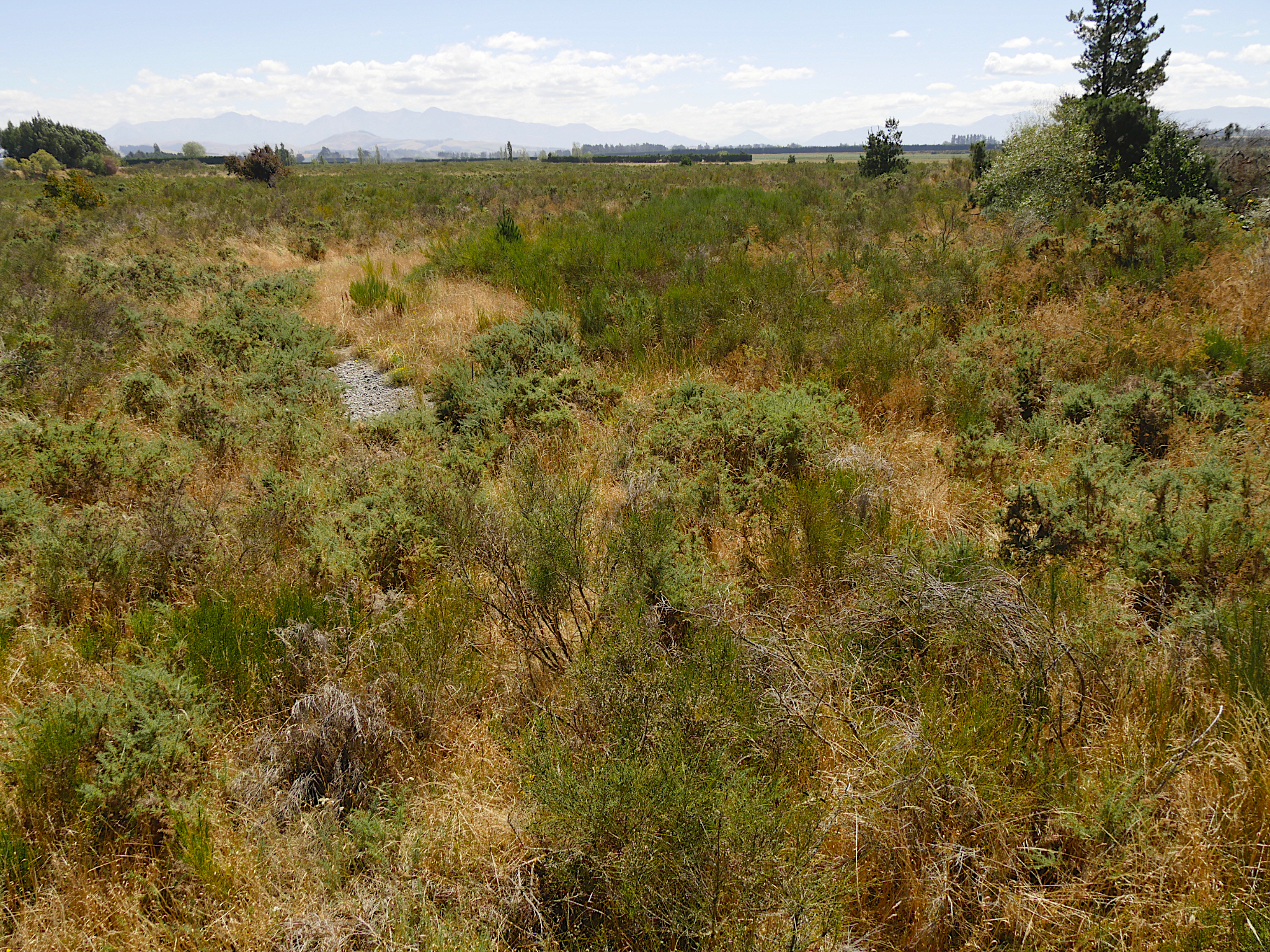
- Hawkins River, 2017. Torlesses Range in the background

Location
- Country: New Zealand

Physical characteristics
- Source
  - location: Big Ben Range
- Mouth
  - location: Selwyn River
- Length: 48 km (30 mi)

The Hawkins River is a river in New Zealand. A major tributary of Canterbury's Selwyn River, it flows generally southeast from its source to the southwest of Springfield, reaching the Selwyn 10 kilometres (6 mi) west of Burnham.

The river also flows through the rural settlement of Hawkins, five kilometers west of Darfield.

== See also ==
- List of rivers of New Zealand
