= Waianiwaniwa River =

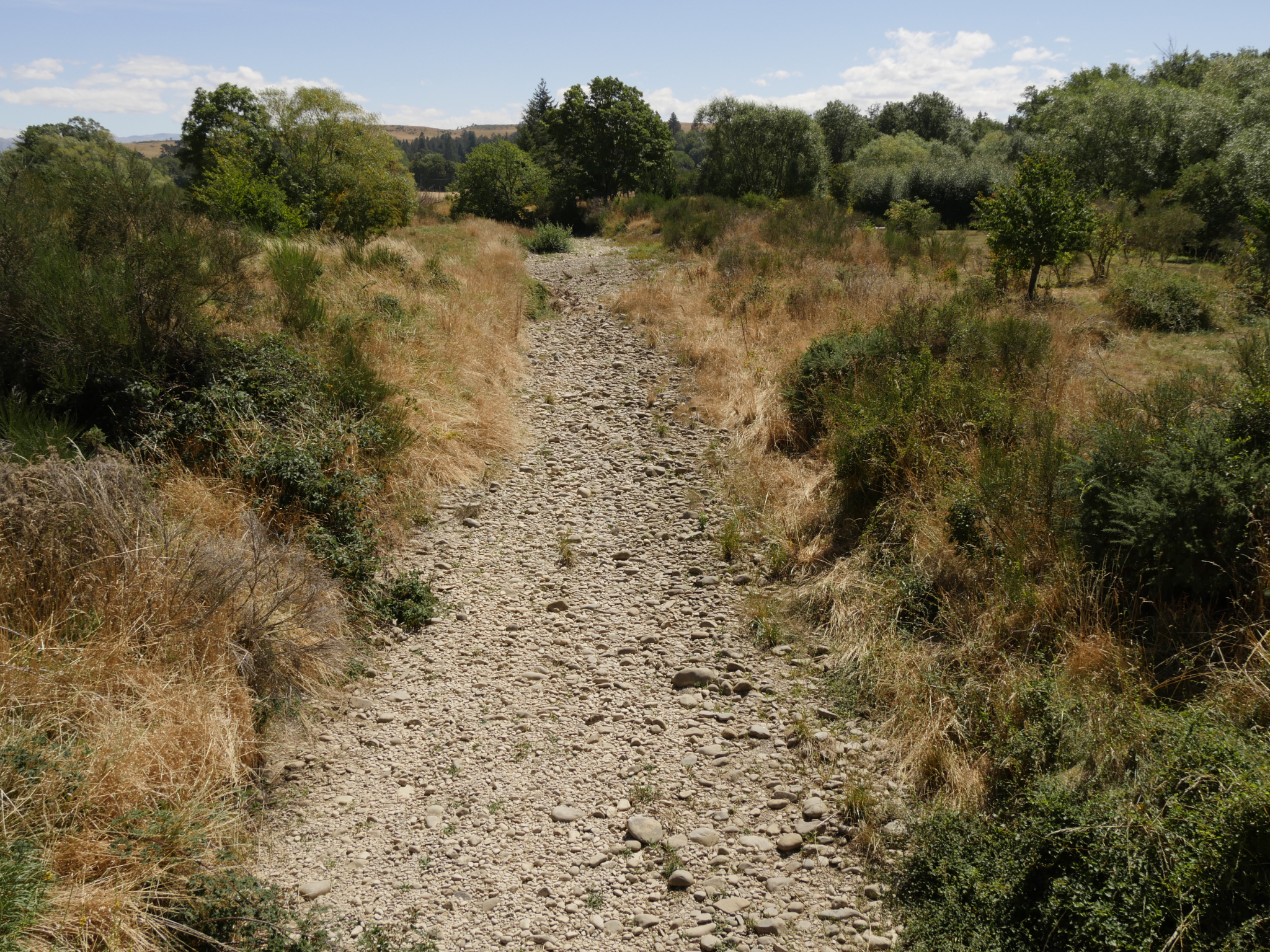
- Dry riverbed of the Waianiwaniwa River, 2017
- Course of the Waianiwaniwa River

Location
- Country: New Zealand

Physical characteristics
- Source
  - location: Malvern Hills
- Mouth
  - location: Selwyn River
  - coordinates: 43.591013°S 172.073520°E
- Length: 23.63 km (14.68 mi)

Basin features
- Tributaries
  - left: Blacks Stream
  - right: Oyster Gully

The Waianiwaniwa River (Waireka) is a river in the Canterbury region of the South Island of New Zealand.

== Location ==
The source is in the Wyndale Hills, which are foothills of the Southern Alps. The Waianiwaniwa River is a tributary of the Selwyn River.

== History ==
The Waianiwaniwa Valley originally belonged to the Deans family. This particular block belonged to one of the Deans sisters and she sold it to the Hawke family. The Hawkes broke it in turning tussock country into dairying country. The homes built by William A Hawke and Ernie Hawke still stand. The first farmer to use top dressing aircraft was Ernie Hawke on this property.

The Central Plains Water Trust previously sought approval to dam the river for their irrigation scheme, with a proposed water level of 280 metres (920 ft) above sea level. The Central Plains Water Trust did not progress with these plans, and the irrigation scheme was fully completed and operational in 2017.

Māori knew the river as "Waireka" (Sweet Water).
