= Selwyn, New Zealand =

Selwyn Herewini (Māori)
- Town
- Location within New Zealand
- Coordinates: 43.649°S 172.227°E

Selwyn is a village in the Selwyn District of Canterbury, New Zealand. It was laid out in the 1860s for a population of 2,000 people, but it currently has very few houses.

== Naming ==
Captain Joseph Thomas, the chief surveyor of the Canterbury Association, named the Selwyn River after Bishop Selwyn, New Zealand's first Anglican Bishop. This township, the district and an electorate later used the same name.

== Geography and transport ==
Selwyn is located just south of the Selwyn River / Waikirikiri and is prone to occasional flooding. It was established around the rail corridor of the Main South Line that was planned in the 1860s. The railway first reached the township in 1867. Most of the time, the river can be forded, and the road bridge was not built until 1927. Its successor bridge now carries State Highway 1 traffic, which crosses the railway line in Selwyn; initially, two right angle bends were provided, later to be replaced by a sweeping S-bend.

Selwyn is 37 kilometres (23 mi) south-west of Christchurch, and 4 kilometres (2.5 mi) north-east of Dunsandel.

== History ==
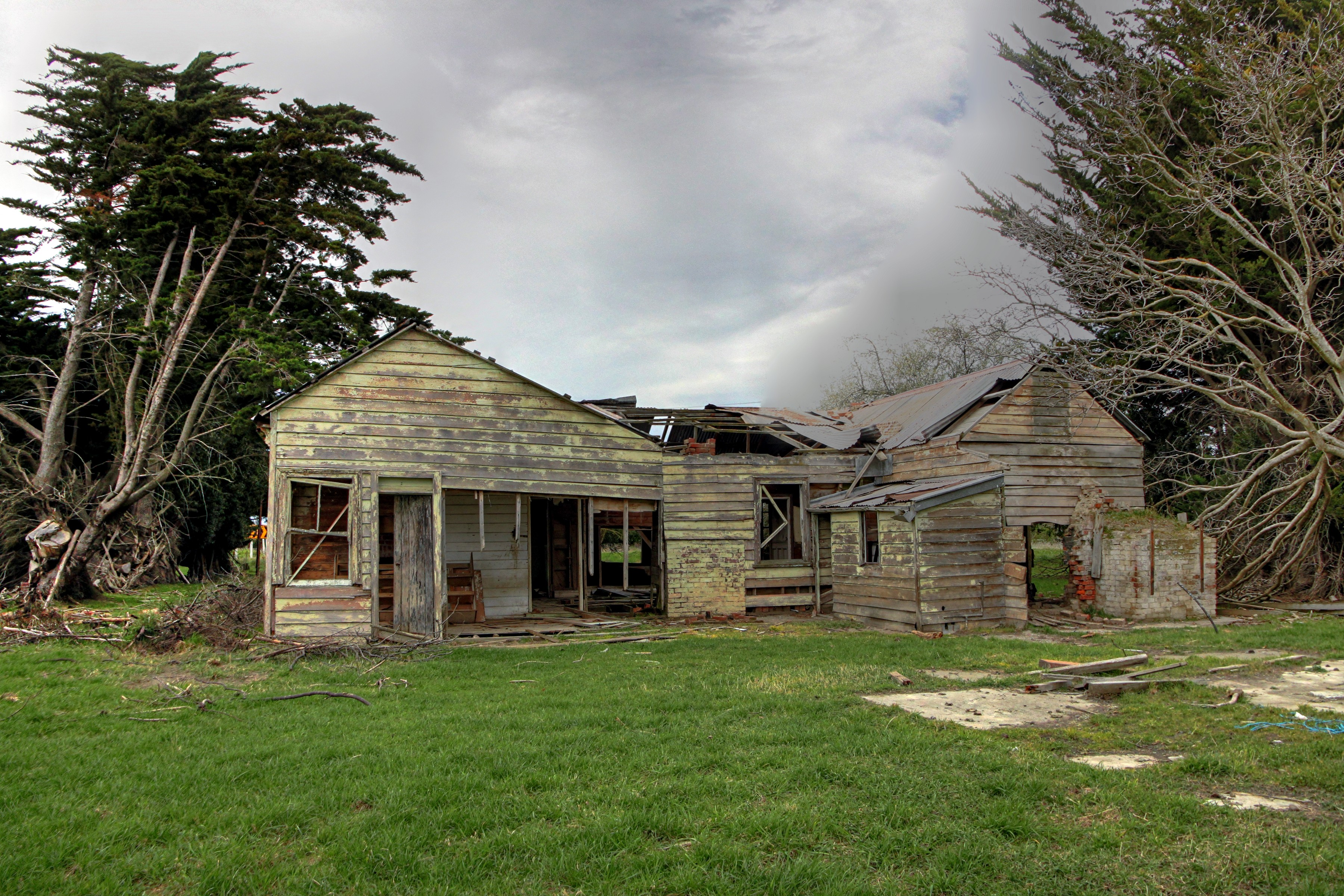
Ruins of a house in Selwyn

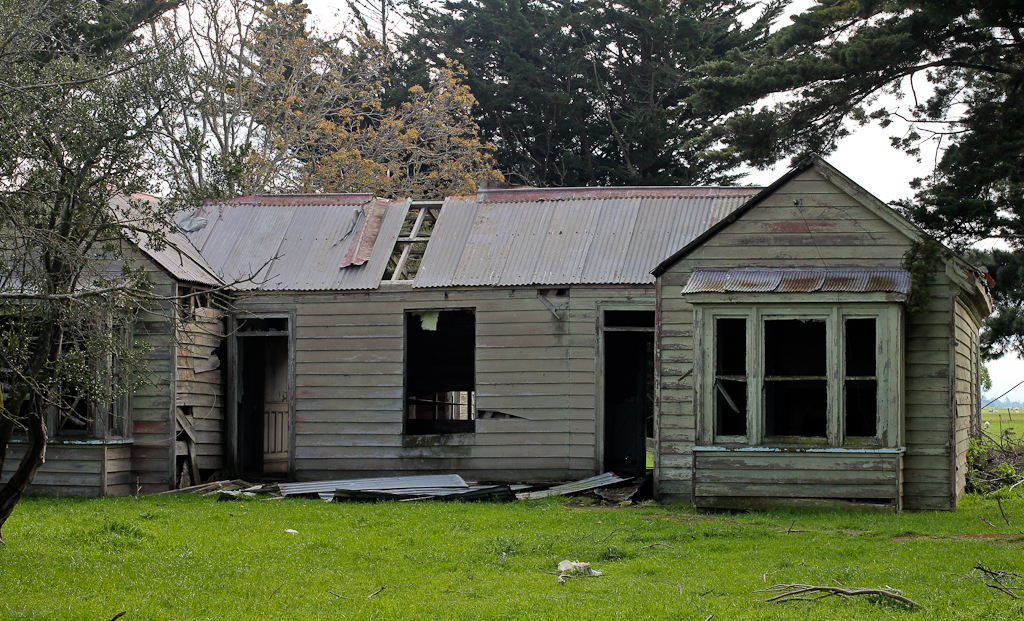
The same house, viewed from the opposite side

Albert Beetham was an engineer and surveyor from Christchurch. Aware of the plans for the Main South railway, Beetham bought a piece of land on either side of the gazetted corridor approximately 1 square kilometre (0.39 sq mi) in size. He subdivided it into 470 sections for a target population of 2,000 and provided two town squares, Victoria Square and Market Square.

The railway reached Rolleston in October 1866, the north bank of the Selwyn River on 7 October 1867, and Selwyn Station via a bridge over the Selwyn River on 16 December 1867. This original bridge, though, was destroyed in a flood on 4 February 1868. Brickwork piers used for the original bridge were replaced by piles in the reconstruction. Due to financial problems of the Canterbury Provincial Council, Selwyn remained the terminus of the line for some years.

For a time, the demand for sections in Selwyn was brisk, and even speculators started buying some of them. At one point, Selwyn had a blacksmith, bootmaker, butcher, saddler, and a wheelwright, and amenities included a boarding house, billiard saloon, a hotel with stables, and some shops. The railway yards were a depot for construction works undertaken by the Provincial Council.

Selwyn's importance waned when the railway reached the south bank of the Rakaia River, where the township of Rakaia formed. The Rakaia River Bridge was formally opened by the provincial Superintendent, William Rolleston, on 29 May 1873.

A far greater problem was ongoing flooding, though. Many residents left Selwyn for the neighbouring township of Dunsandel. Even the hotel itself was, in about 1900, shifted to Dunsandel. Today, Selwyn has fewer than ten houses, with many derelict cottages still visible. Selwyn celebrated its 150th birthday in September 2012.
