= Hororata River =

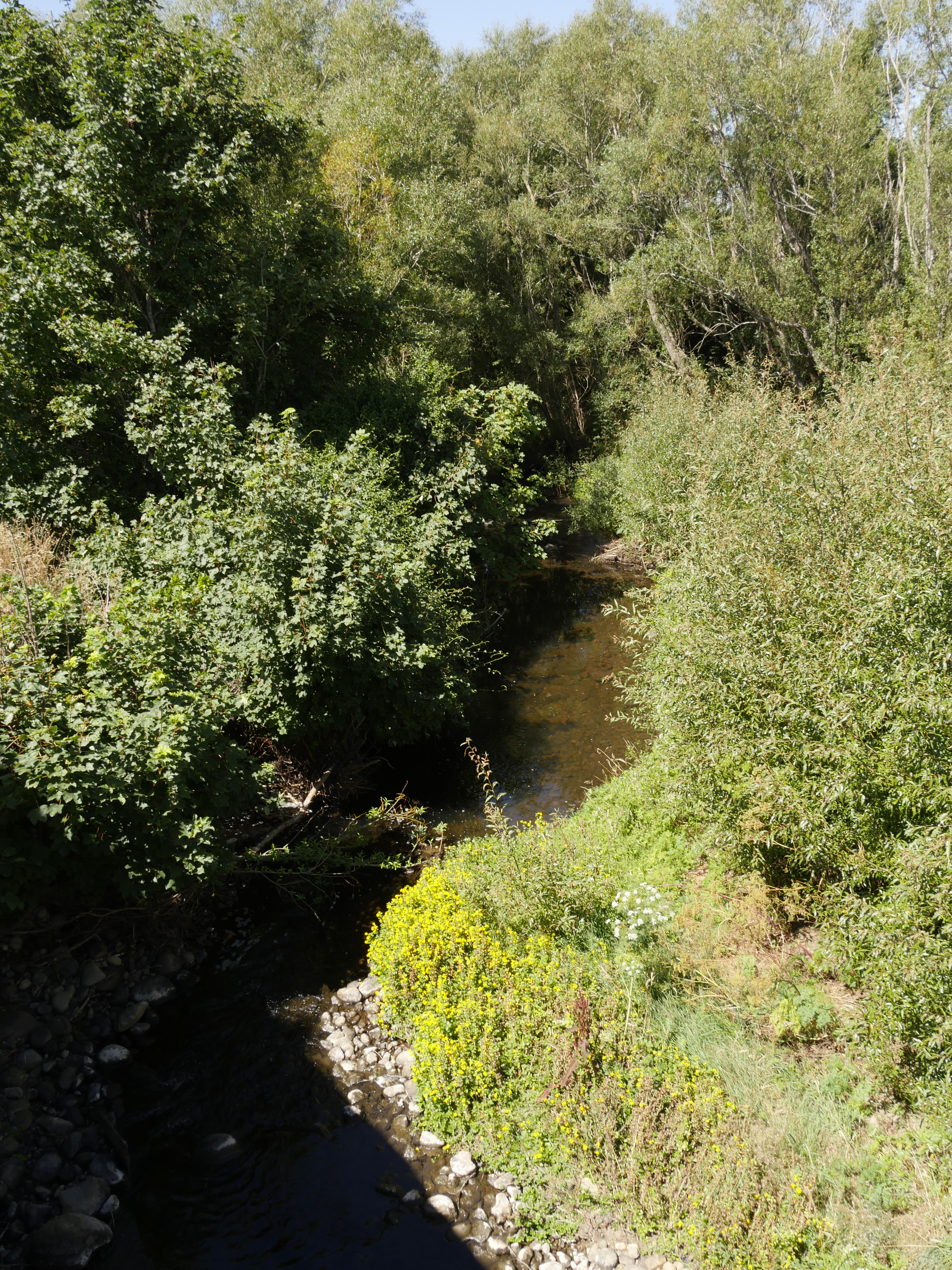
- View of Hororata River from the SH 77 bridge
- Course of the Hororata River

Location
- Country: New Zealand

Physical characteristics
- Source
  - location: Rockwood Range
- Mouth
  - location: Selwyn River
  - coordinates: 43.604543°S 172.084501°E
- Length: 35 km (22 mi)

Basin features
- Tributaries
  - left: Boundary Stream
  - right: Washpen Creek

The Hororata River flows through the Selwyn District of Canterbury in New Zealand. A tributary of the Selwyn River, the Hororata has its sources in rough hill country north of Windwhistle from two streams: Washpen Creek and Boundary Stream. It then flows east through the township of Hororata before reaching the Selwyn 1.7 kilometres (1.1 mi) south of Greendale.

== See also ==
- List of rivers of New Zealand
