= Rakaia River =

River in Canterbury, New Zealand

Coordinates: 43°56′S 172°13′E

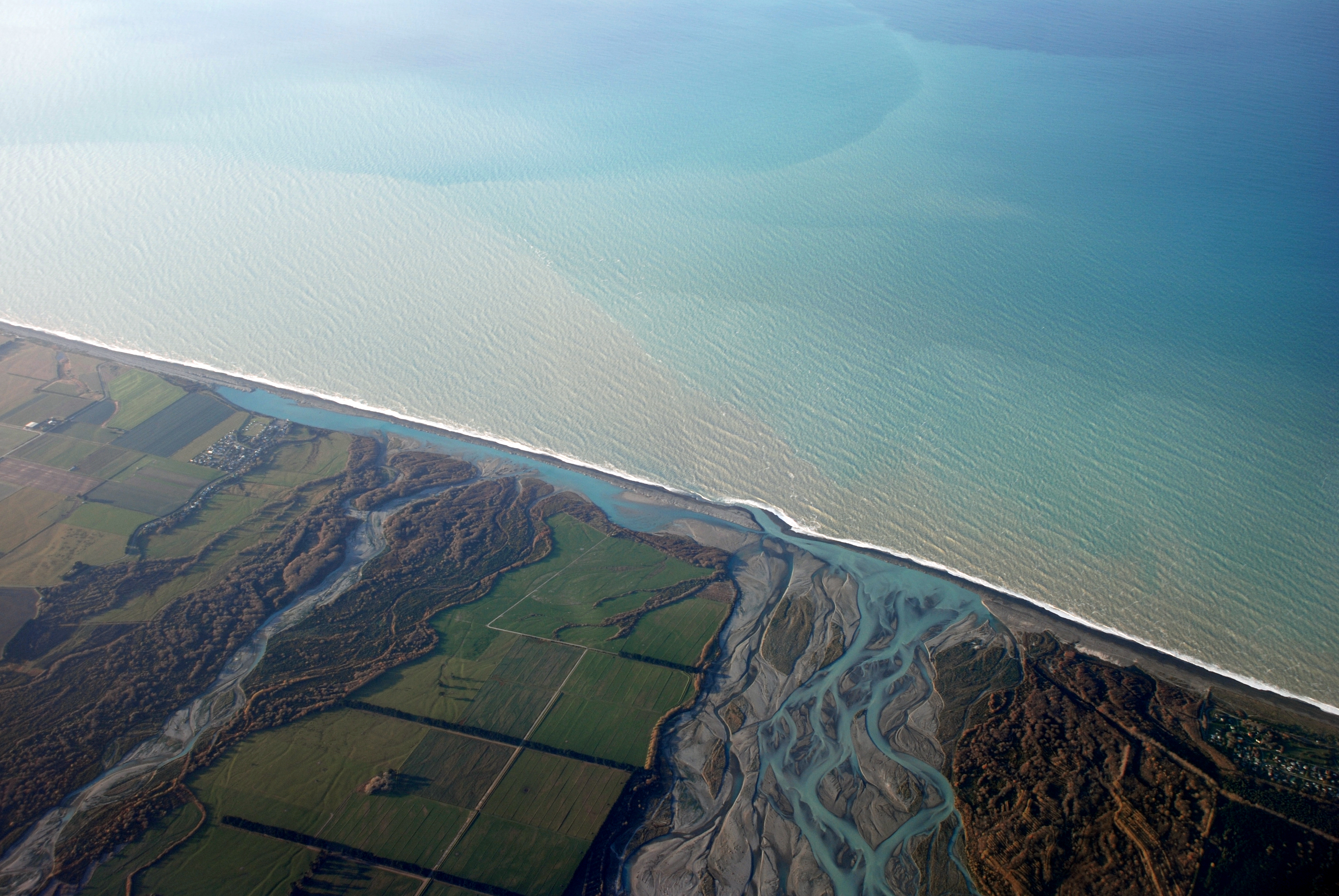
- Rakaia River mouth

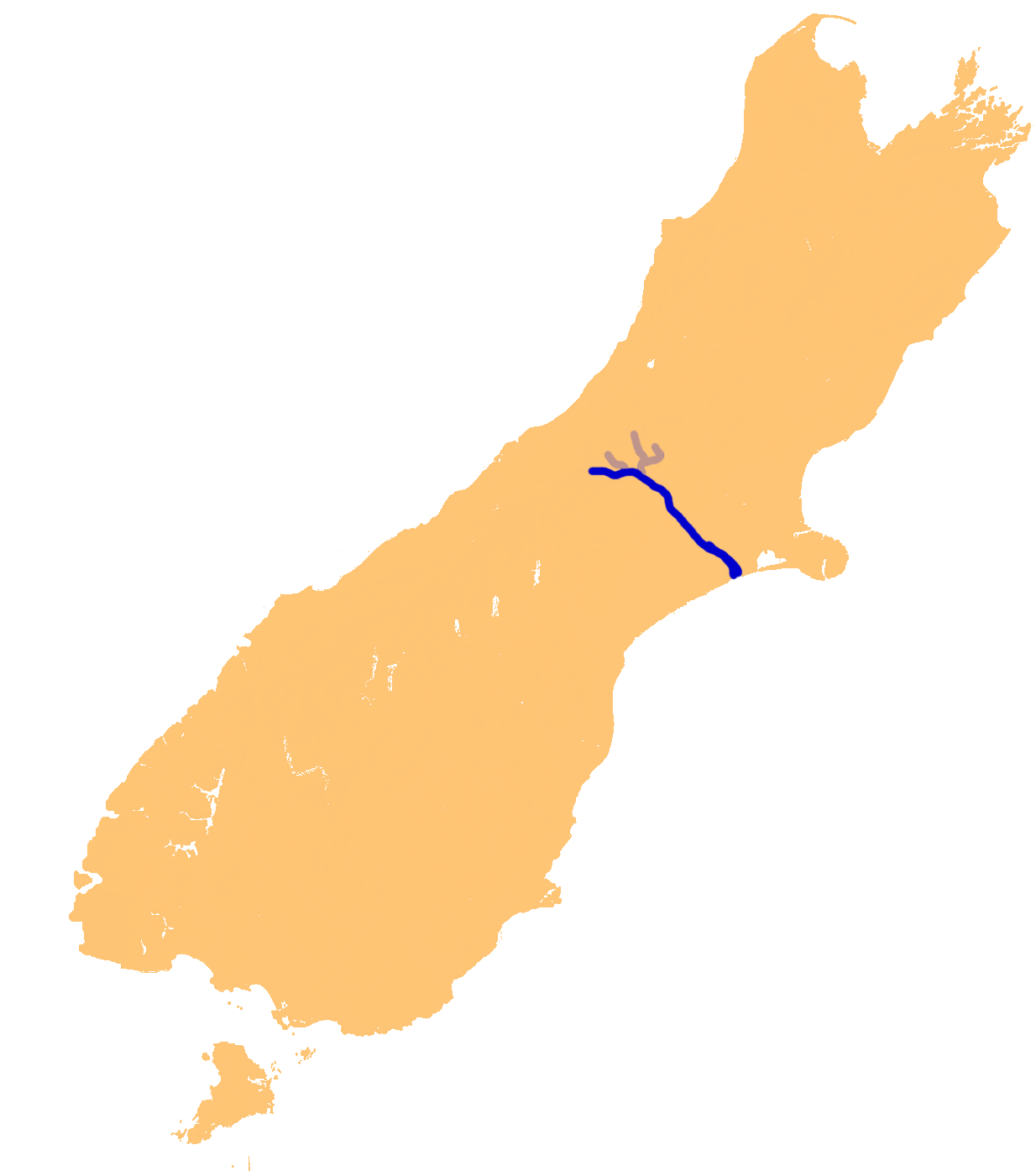
- The Rakaia River system
- Native name: Rakaia (Māori)

Physical characteristics
- Source: Southern Alps
- Length: 150 kilometres (93 mi)
- Discharge
  - average: 203 cubic metres per second (7,200 cu ft/s)
  - minimum: 87 m^{3}/s (3,100 cu ft/s)

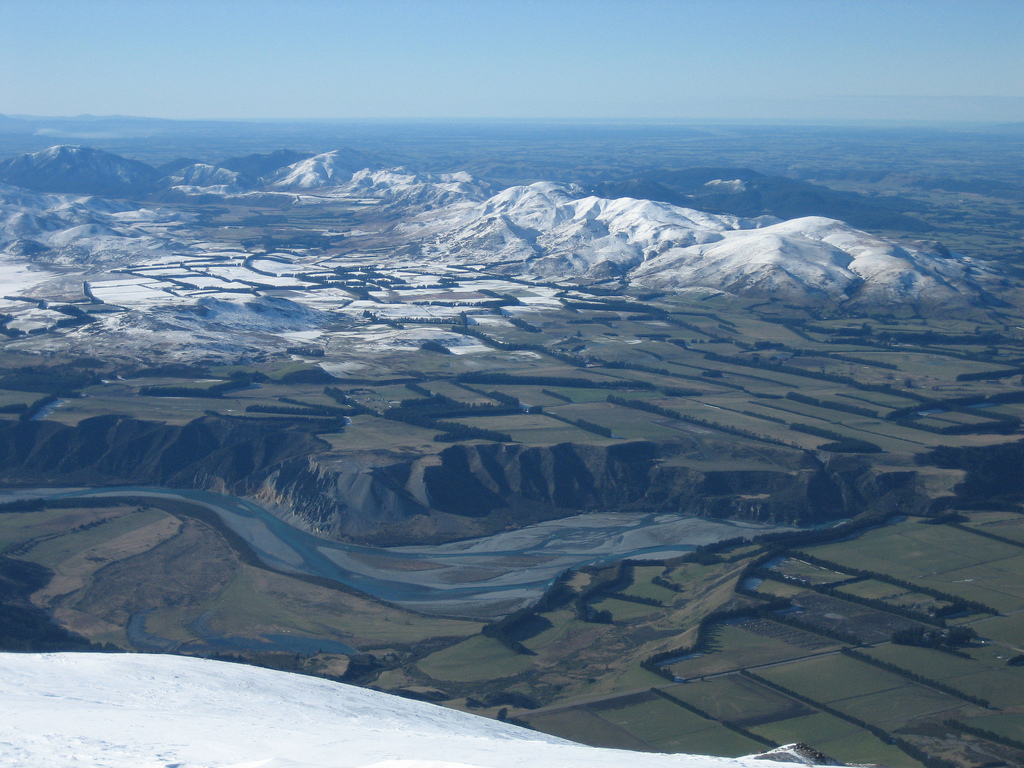
The Rakaia River as viewed from Mount Hutt

The Rakaia River is in the Canterbury Plains in New Zealand's South Island. The Rakaia River is one of the largest braided rivers in New Zealand. The Rakaia River has a mean flow of 203 cubic metres per second (7,200 cu ft/s) and a mean annual seven-day low flow of 87 m^{3}/s (3,100 cu ft/s). In the 1850s, European settlers named it the Cholmondeley River, but this name lapsed into disuse. The name Rakaia comes from Māori "Ō Rakaia", meaning the place where people were arranged by ranks.

== Description ==
It rises in the Southern Alps, travelling 150 kilometres (93 mi) in a generally easterly or southeasterly direction before entering the Pacific Ocean 50 kilometres (31 mi) south of Christchurch. It forms a lagoon as it reaches the ocean.

For much of its journey, the river is braided, running through a wide shingle bed. Close to Mount Hutt, however, it is briefly confined to a narrow canyon known as the Rakaia Gorge.

The Rakaia River is bridged in two places. The busiest crossing is at the small town of Rakaia, 20 kilometres (12 mi) from the river mouth, where State Highway 1 using Rakaia Bridge and the South Island Main Trunk Railway cross the river using separate bridges. These two bridges are New Zealand's longest road and rail bridges respectively, approximately 1.75 kilometres (1.09 mi) long. A second bridge, much shorter and less used, spans the Rakaia Gorge.

The Central Plains Water Trust is proposing to take up to 40 m^{3}/s (1,400 cu ft/s) of water from the Rakaia River as part of the Central Plains Water enhancement scheme.

The Rakaia River is a celebrated Chinook salmon fishery. It has been identified as an Important Bird Area by BirdLife International because it supports breeding colonies of the endangered black-billed gull. The river is also known for its large wrybill population which represents 73 percent of the total population. Other important bird species using the riverbed are black-fronted tern and banded dotterel.
