= Selwyn River =

River in New Zealand

Selwyn River Selwyn River / Waikirikiri
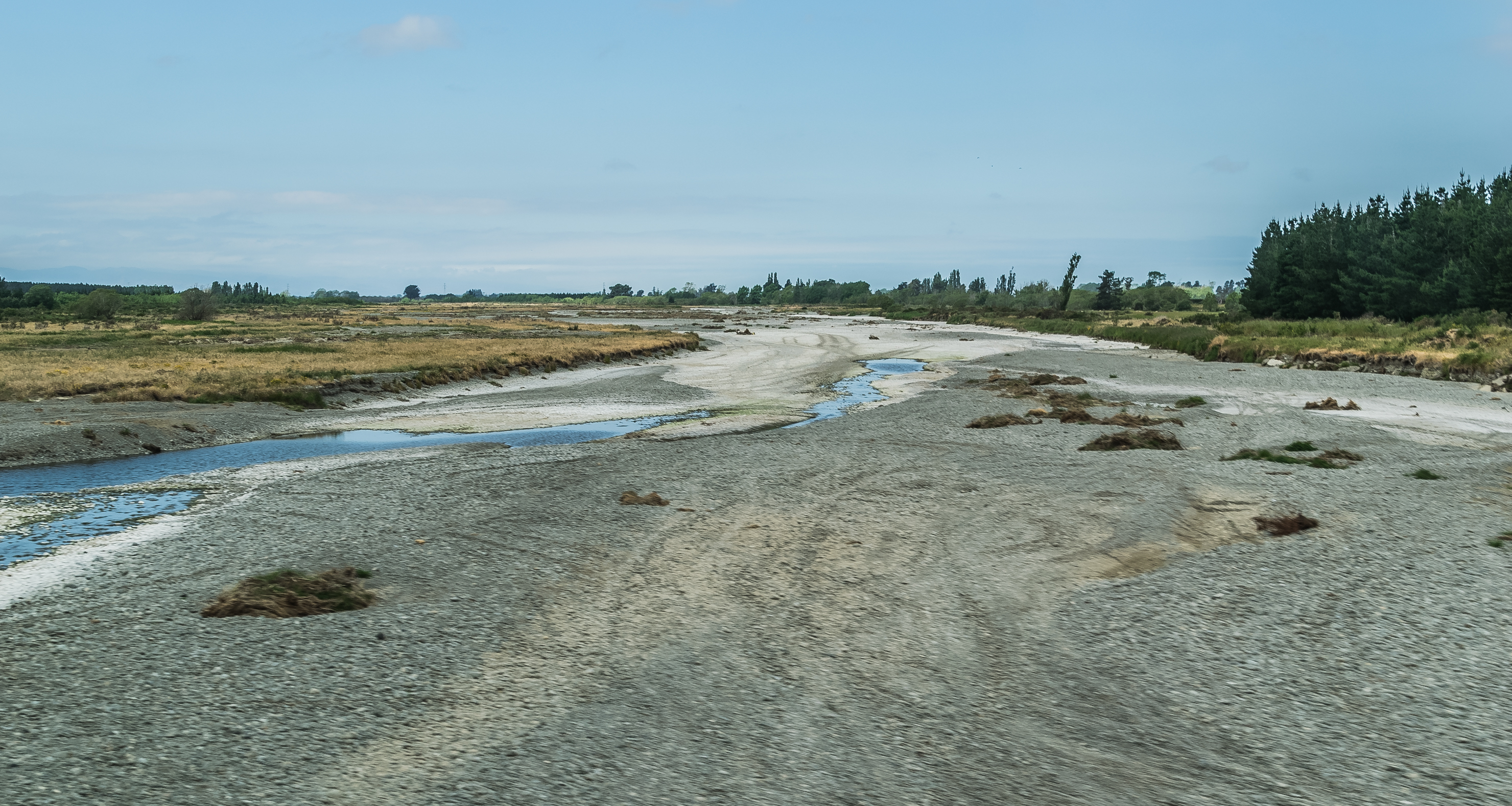
- Selwyn River near Dunsandel, November 2017
- Course of the Selwyn River
- Etymology: Translates as "gravelly water", and named after Bishop Selwyn.
- Native name: Waikirikiri (Māori)

Location
- Country: New Zealand

Physical characteristics
- Source
  - location: Big Ben Range
- Mouth
  - location: Lake Ellesmere / Te Waihora
  - coordinates: 43°44′38″S 172°26′52″E
- Length: 80 km (50 mi)

Basin features
- Tributaries
  - left: Hororata River
  - right: Waianiwaniwa River; Hawkins River

The Selwyn River (Māori: Waikirikiri, officially gazetted as Selwyn River / Waikirikiri) flows through the Selwyn District of Canterbury in the South Island of New Zealand.

== Description ==
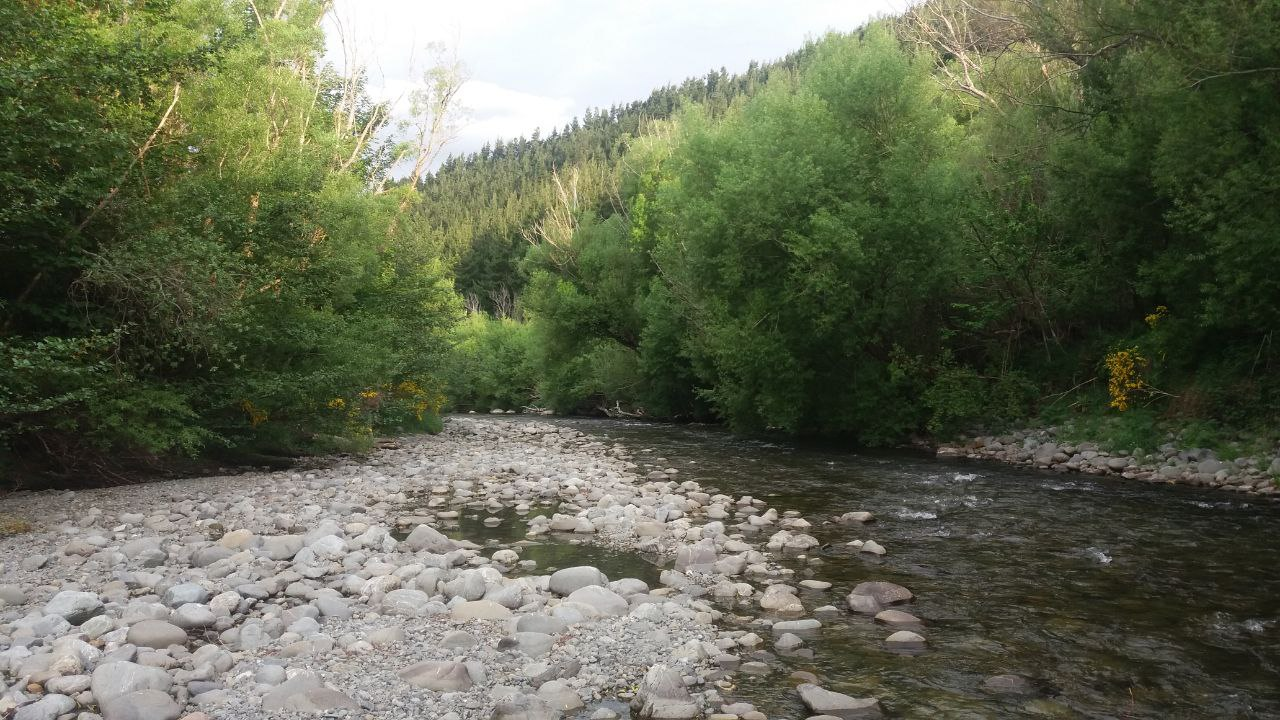
The River Walk, where the Wairiri Stream meets the Selwyn River (November 2019)

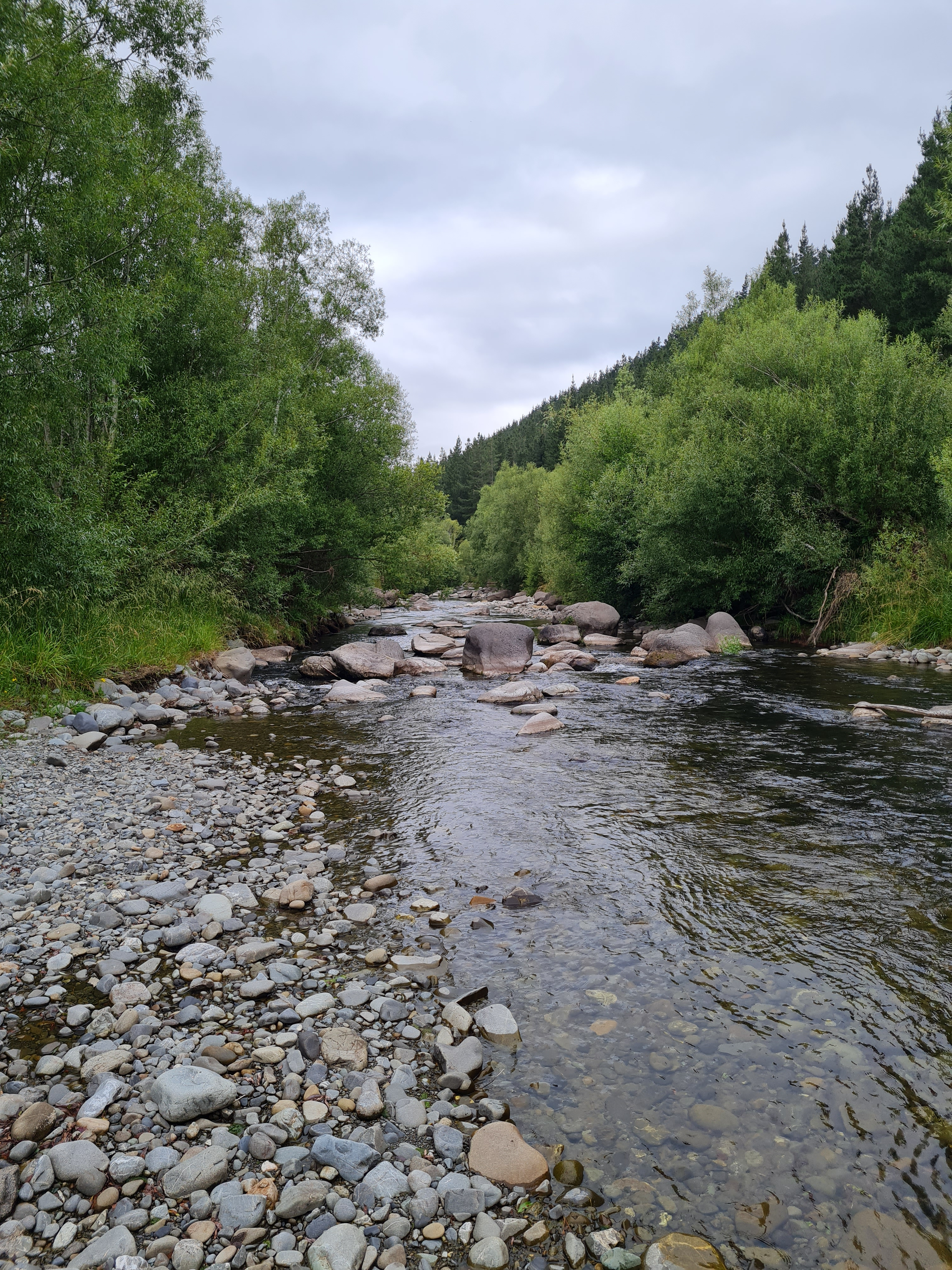
The Selwyn River looking downstream, Harper Hills to the right and the camping ground to the left (January 2024)

The river has its source in the Southern Alps and flows east for 80 kilometres (50 mi) before emptying into Lake Ellesmere / Te Waihora, south of Banks Peninsula. Terrace cliffs above the river's upper reaches gave the town of Whitecliffs its name.

For much of its course the river flows through wide shingle channels. In drought years, the river can disappear beneath this bed and seem to dry up completely. This frequently occurs where State Highway 1 crosses the river at the settlement of Selwyn, about 20 kilometres (12 mi) upstream from its outflow into Lake Ellesmere.

In the foothills, the Selwyn flows year-round. On the plains, the riverbed is highly permeable, and the river overlays a deep and porous aquifer. As soon as the river reaches the plains, water begins leaking down through the bed and into the aquifer. In most months, all river-water disappears within 5 kilometres (3 mi) of leaving the foothills. The next 35 kilometres (22 mi) of the river remains dry for most of the year, apart from a small section around the confluence with the permanently flowing Hororata River. About 15 kilometres (9 mi) upstream from Lake Ellesmere shallow groundwater rises back to the surface, and the Selwyn becomes permanent again.

== Bridges ==
There are six bridges that cross the Selwyn River. These are at: Whitecliffs (Whitecliffs Road), Glentunnel (SH 77), Coalgate (Hororata Road), Hororata (Bealey Road), Selwyn (SH 1) and Irwell (Leeston Road). It is also possible to cross at Coes Ford when the river is not in flood. Chamberlains Ford is no longer a ford. The nearby Irwell bridge provides access to the other side of the river.

== Ecology ==
Disappearing river flows have significant ecological effects: when the river’s surface water disappears, so does the habitat for many aquatic plants and animals. In response to loss of surface water, aquatic invertebrates and fish must disperse, seek refuge in remnant aquatic habitats, or die. Aquatic plants, algae, and bacteria must form resting stages or die. The dry central reaches of the Selwyn River also constitute a significant barrier for dispersal of invertebrates and for fish migrating between Lake Ellesmere and the headwaters.

=== Fishing ===
The Selwyn river was viewed historically as one of New Zealand’s best trout fisheries. In the 1960s a trout trap at Coes Ford was reported to count up to 14,000 returning spawning trout. In 2017, the numbers have declined to the stage that only dozens of trout could be counted when returning to spawn. The fish in the river have been described as low in number and the majority of the fish are quite small.

== Pollution ==
The Canterbury Regional Council (ECan) has permitted intensive dairy farming around Selwyn and it has been suggested that this has led to a deterioration in the water quality of the Selwyn river. In May 2021, it was reported that nitrate levels in the Selwyn River has increased by 50%.

It is no longer recommended that people go swimming in the Selwyn River. Coes Ford was once a well known swimming spot in Canterbury. The water at Coes Ford was reported to be in the worst 25% in New Zealand for total nitrate levels in 2020. The pollution at Coes Ford is thought to come from Silverstream creek, which used surrounded by many of the dairy farms in the area.

Chamberlain's Ford which crosses the Selwyn River had an algal bloom health warning issued in December 2020. There were benthic cyanobacteria found in the river. Algal Blooms of benthic cyanobacteria have also been reported at in the Selwyn river at Whitecliffs Domain and Whitecliffs Road in March 2021.

Greenpeace placed billboards in the Selwyn River to protest the degree of pollution in it in February 2020.

== Naming ==
The Selwyn River and its gorge were named in 1849 by the chief surveyor of the Canterbury Association, Joseph Thomas, for Bishop Selwyn. The name was later adopted for the township, the district, and an electorate.

The New Zealand Ministry for Culture and Heritage gives a translation of "gravelly stream" for Waikirikiri.
