= Central Plains Water =

Map of the Central Plains Water Enhancement Scheme area.

Central Plains Water, or, more fully, the Central Plains Water Enhancement Scheme, is a large-scale proposal for water diversion, damming, reticulation and irrigation for the Central Plains of Canterbury, New Zealand. Construction started on the scheme in 2014.

The original proposal involved diversion of water, the construction of a storage dam, tunnels and a series of canals and water races to supply water for irrigation to an area of 60,000 hectares on the Canterbury Plains. Water will be taken from the Rakaia and Waimakariri Rivers.

In June 2010, resource consents for the scheme were approved in a revised form without the storage dam. From 2010 to 2012, the resource consents were under appeal to the Environment Court. In July 2012, the resource consents for the scheme were finalised by the Environment Court.

The Central Plains Water Enhancement Scheme originated as a feasibility study jointly initiated and funded by Christchurch City Council and Selwyn District Council.

The Central Plains Water Enhancement Scheme is contentious. It is opposed by community, recreation and environment groups, some city and regional councillors, and some corporate dairying interests. The scheme is supported by Christchurch City Council and Selwyn District Council staff and some councillors, irrigation interests, consultants, farming interests, and more recently, some corporate dairying interests.

== Scope ==
Canterbury Regional Council has summarised the scope of the Central Plains Water enhancement scheme as follows;

'The applicants propose to irrigate 60,000 hectares of land between the Rakaia and Waimakariri Rivers from the Malvern foothills to State Highway One. Water will be abstracted at a rate of up to 40 m^{3}/s from two points on the Waimakariri River and one point on the Rakaia River. The water will be irrigated directly from the river and via a storage system. The proposal includes a 55-metre high storage dam within the Waianiwaniwa Valley and associated land use applications for works within watercourses.'

The proposed dam would be about 2 kilometres long, with a maximum height of 55 metres, with a base width of about 250 metres, and 10 m wide crest, with a capacity of 280 million cubic metres. The dam would be 1.5 kilometres north east of the town of Coalgate. The two rivers and the reservoir would be connected by a headrace canal, 53 kilometres long, 5 metres deep and 30 metres wide (40–50 metres including embankments). Water would be delivered to farmers via 460 kilometres of water races, ranging in width from 14 to 27 metres, including the embankments.

== A brief history ==
In 1991, Christchurch City Council and the Selwyn District Council, in their annual planning process, agree on a feasibility study on irrigation of the Central Plains. The two councils provide a budget and set up a joint steering committee. In 2000, the steering committee contracts consulting firm URS New Zealand Limited to prepare a scoping report. In late 2001, the steering committee applies for resource consent to take 40 m^{3}/s of water from the Rakaia River and the Waimakariri River. In January 2002, the steering committee releases the feasibility study and seeks to continue the project.

In 2003, the Central Plains Water Trust was set up to apply for resource consents, and the Trust establishes a company, Central Plains Water Limited, to raise funds from farmers via a share subscription. In 2004 Central Plains Water Limited issued a share prospectus and the share subscription is over-subscribed. In November 2005, further consent applications for land and water use were lodged with Canterbury Regional Council and Central Plains Water Limited becomes a 'requiring authority'. In June 2006, further consent applications for land use and a notice of requirement, the precursor to the use of the Public Works Act to compulsorily acquire land, are lodged with Selwyn District Council.

In July 2007, the trustees of Central Plains Water Trust informed Christchurch City Council that they had run out of money to fund the lawyers and consultants needed for the consent and notice of requirement hearings. Christchurch City Council gave approval for Central Plains Water Limited to borrow up to $4.8 million from corporate dairy farmer Dairy Holdings Limited. The hearing to decide the resource consent applications and submissions and the notice of requirement commenced on 25 February 2008.

In September 2012, Selwyn District Council approved a loan of $5 million to Central Plains Water Limited for the design stage.

== Supporters ==
The Central Plains Water enhancement scheme has had a small but influential group of supporters, some of whom have been involved as steering committee members, trustees and company directors. The supporters have included development-minded council politicians, council staff with water engineering backgrounds, directors of council-owned companies, farmer representatives and consultants. The advancement of the scheme appears to have coincided with career moves and business interests of some of these supporters.

The initial membership of Central Plains Water Enhancement Steering Committee consisted of Councillor Pat Harrow (Christchurch City Council) and Councillors Christiansen and Wild (Selwyn District Council) and Doug Marsh, Jack Searle, John Donkers, Willie Palmer and Doug Catherwood. Christchurch City councillor Denis O'Rourke was soon added and Doug Marsh became chairperson.

Doug Marsh is now the Chairperson of the Central Plains Water Trust and a director of Central Plains Water Limited. He describes himself as a "Christchurch-based professional (company) director" Doug Marsh appears to specialise in council-owned companies. Doug Marsh is also the Chairman of the board of the Directors of the Selwyn Plantation Board Ltd, the Chairman of Plains Laminates Ltd, Chairman of the Canterbury A & P Board, Chairman of Southern Cross Engineering Holdings Ltd, a Director of City Care Ltd, a Director of Electricity Ashburton Ltd and a Director of Hindin Communications Ltd Denis O'Rourke and Doug Catherwood, who were two of the original members of the steering committee, are now Trustees of the Central Plains Water Trust.

Allan Watson, who was the Christchurch City Council Water Services Manager in 1999, had a very important role. Watson wrote most of the reports submitted to the Christchurch City Council strategy and resources committee between late 1999 and 2003. Watson wrote the initial report to the Christchurch City Council strategy and resources committee that set up the Central Plains joint steering committee. Watson wrote the crucial report in February 2002 that recommended that the scheme be considered feasible and that the role of the steering committee be continued. Watson had previously been the Malvern County Engineer for 10 years. Allan Watson now works for the consulting firm GHD and he has publicly represented GHD as the project managers for the Central Plains Water Enhancement scheme.

In 2000, Walter Lewthwaite was one of the original Christchurch City Council employees supporting the joint Steering Committee. Lewthwaite had 30 years experience in water engineering and 14 years experience in managing irrigation projects. In November 2005, Lewthwaite was a Senior Environmental Engineer employed by URS New Zealand Limited, and the project manager and co-author of the application for resource consents lodged with Canterbury Regional Council. By June 2006, Lewthwaite was an Associate of URS New Zealand Limited. In September 2006, Lewthwaite also prepared information to support the applications to Selwyn District Council.

== Opponents ==
The Central Plains Water Enhancement Scheme is opposed by farmers and community, recreation and environment groups. Opponents include;

- individual farmers such as Sheffield Valley farmer Marty Lucas who will lose more than 30% of his property.
- the Malvern Hills Protection Society formerly the 'Dam Action Group',
- the Water Rights Trust,
- the New Zealand Recreational Canoeing Association,
- the Christchurch-based White Water Canoe Club,
- the Royal Forest and Bird Protection Society of New Zealand,
- the Fish and Game Council of New Zealand, and,
- the Green Party of Aotearoa New Zealand,

Between 1,192 and 1,316 of public submitters oppose the 64 notified consent applications lodged with Canterbury Regional Council and between 153 and 172 submissions are in support. The range of numbers of submitters given is presumably due to some of the submissions specifying some specific consent applications rather than all of the applications included in the proposal.

== Costs ==
Central Plains Water Enhancement Scheme cost estimates from 2000 to 2007.

The estimated construction costs of the scheme have doubled since the 2002 'feasibility' study and have increased by 500% since the first scoping study.

In December 2000, the initial scoping study estimated the total cost of the scheme to be $NZ120 million or $1,190.48 per hectare irrigated.

By September 2001, the estimated scheme cost was $NZ201.7 million or $2,400 per hectare irrigated.

In February 2002, when Christchurch City Council and Selwyn District Council were presented with the feasibility study, the estimated scheme cost was $NZ235 million for 84,000 hectares or $2,798 per hectare irrigated.

At 1 April 2004, the estimated scheme cost was $NZ372 million for 60,000 hectares or $6,200 per hectare irrigated.

In January 2006, Central Plains Water Limited director John Donkers stated that the total cost was $NZ367 million for 60,000 hectares or $NZ6,117 per hectare.

In December 2007, the estimate of the total cost of the scheme appeared to be $6,826 per hectare irrigated.

On 19 February 2008, the evidence of Walter Lewthwaite, one of the principal engineering witnesses for Central Plains Water Trust, became available from the Canterbury Regional Council website. Lewthwaite states that in early 2007 he compiled and supplied an estimate of the total scheme cost to Mr Donnelly (the economist) and Mr MacFarlane (the farm management consultant) for their use in providing the economic analysis. The estimate was $NZ409.6 million for a scheme area of 60,000 hectares, or $6,826 per hectare irrigated.

== The feasibility study stage ==
The constitution and terms of reference for the Central Plains Water Enhancement Steering Committee was approved on 14 February 2000. The terms of reference had these two objectives:

- to execute feasibility studies into the viability and practicality of water enhancement schemes in the Central Plains area,..
- is to undertake feasibility studies for the Central Plains area sufficiently detailed to allow decisions on the advisability of proceeding to resource consent applications and eventual scheme implementation.

The feasibility studies also had a required level of detail:

The level of detail of these studies shall be sufficient to allow decisions to be made by the Councils on the advisability of proceeding to resource consent applications and scheme implementation.

By February 2001, the steering committee had identified 27 tasks that would be necessary to complete the feasibility study. The list of tasks is comprehensive; it included the assessment of economic effects, benefits, environmental effects, social effects, cultural effects, risks, planning, land accessibility, and environmental and technical feasibility, and consentability. Item 23 was specifically entitled 'Land Accessibility'.

On 11 February 2002 the Central Plains Water Enhancement Steering Committee presented the URS feasibility report and their own report to a joint meeting of the two 'parent' Councils. On 18 February 2002 the reports were presented to the Strategy and Finance committee of the Christchurch City Council.

The conclusion of the URS feasibility study was stated fairly firmly;

"that a water enhancement scheme for the Central Plains can be built, is affordable, will have effects that can be mitigated, and is therefore feasible"

The Steering Committee's conclusion was much less firm.

"the affordability, bankability and consentability of the proposed scheme has been proved to a degree sufficient to give the Selwyn District Council and Christchurch City Councils confidence to proceed with the project to the next stage."

The Steering Committee had not provided a full conclusion on a number of issues from the list of 27 feasibility study tasks. They had instead simply moved the resolution of a number of the important issues from the feasibility study stage to a new stage to be called 'concept refinement'. The issues to be dealt with later were;

- more technical investigations
- the scheme's ownership structure
- how to acquire land for dams and races
- the mitigation of social, environmental and cultural effects.

== Court actions with other competing abstractors ==
Central Plains Water Trust has been in some lengthy litigation with Ngāi Tahu Properties Limited and Synlait. The three entities have resource consents or applications for resource consents to take the same water - the remaining water from the Rakaia and Waimakariri Rivers, allocated for abstraction by the Rakaia Water Conservation Order or the Waimakariri Rivers Regional Plan. The issue before the courts is 'who has first access to limited water? The first to have consent granted? The first to file an application to take water? The first to file all necessary applications? The first to have replied to requests for information so that the application is complete and therefore 'notifiable'? The cases have been appealed up to the Supreme Court.

=== Ngāi Tahu Properties Limited ===
On 28 January 2005, Ngāi Tahu Properties Limited had applied for competing resource consents to take 3.96 m³/s of water from the Waimakariri River and use it for irrigation of 5,700 hectares of land to the north of the Waimakariri River. On 17 September 2005 the Ngai Tahu applications were publicly notified. A hearing before independent commissioners was held in February 2006. On 26 and 27 June 2006, Ngāi Tahu Properties Limited sought a declaration from the Environment Court that their application to take water from the Waimakariri River had 'priority' over the 2001 CPWT application and therefore could be granted before the CPWT application.

On 22 August 2006, the Environment Court released a decision that Ngāi Tahu Properties Limited had priority to the remaining 'A' allocation block of water from the Waimakariri River over the Central Plains Water Trust application.

The Central Plains Water Trust then appealed the decision to the High Court on the grounds that as they had applied first their priority to the water should be upheld, in spite of the fact that a decision would be some time in the future. The High Court agreed with the Environment Court that priority to a limited resource went to the applications that were ready to be 'notifiable' first, not the applicant who applied first. That decision confirmed that Ngāi Tahu Properties Limited would be able to take water under their consents from the Waimakariri River at a more optimal minimum flow than any later consent granted to Central Plains Water Trust.

However, Central Plains Water Trust appealed this decision to the Court of Appeal and the case was heard on 28 February 2008. On 19 March 2008, the Court of Appeal released a majority decision, that reversed the Environment Court and High Court decisions and awarded priority to Central Plains Water Trust. Justice Robertson gave a dissenting minority opinion that without the full information, the original CPW application had not been ready for notification in 2001.

On 24 June 2008 the Supreme Court granted Ngai Tahu Property Limited leave to hear an appeal of the Court of Appeal decision.

=== Synlait ===
In early 2007, the Central Plains Water Trust and the Ashburton Community Water Trust went to the Environment Court for a declaration that their 2001 consent application for water from the Rakaia River had priority over the consent application made by dairying company Synlait (Robindale) Dairies.

In May 2007, the Environment Court ruled the Central Plains Water Trust application had priority over the Synlait application. Synlait Director Ben Dingle said that the decision was being appealed to the High Court. The High Court heard this appeal on 23 and 24 October 2007. On 13 March 2008, the High Court released its decision to uphold the appeal and to award priority to Synlait. Central Plains Water Limited announced it would lodge an appeal with the Court of Appeal.

== The corporate dairying connection ==
In May 2007, confidential minutes from the March board meeting of Central Plains Water Limited were leaked to media. The minutes stated that the councils (Christchurch and Selwyn District) must agree to a 'bail out' loan or the scheme would be 'killed'. Central Plains Water later confirmed that the corporate dairy farming company, Dairy Holdings Limited, was prepared to offer a large loan to the scheme. Dairy Holdings Limited operates 57 dairy farms and is owned by Timaru millionaire Allan Hubbard and Fonterra board member Colin Armer.

On 5 June 2007, Christchurch City Council was informed that Central Plains Water Limited had 'a shortfall of $NZ1 million' and had run out of money needed to pay for the expenses of the impending hearings on the applications for the various resource consents.

On 7 June 2007, the Christchurch City Council authorised two Council general managers to approve loan agreements for CPWL to borrow up to a maximum of $4.8 million, subject to the Central Plains Water Trust continuing to 'own' the resource consents, as required by the April 2003 Memorandum of Understanding.

The Malvern Hills Protection Society questioned whether the Central Plains resource consent applications had been offered as security for the $NZ4.8million loan and whether such a loan would breach the 2004 CPW Memorandum of Agreement, which forbids transferring or assigning its interest in the resource consents. Similarly, Ben Dingle, a director of the competing dairying company, Synlait, also questioned the community benefit of the Central Plains project, as the main benefits of irrigation schemes (increased land values and higher-value land-uses) flow to the landowners who have access to the water.

A report to the Christchurch City Council meeting of 13 December 2007 gives the details of the final loan arrangements. On 19 October 2007, two Council general managers signed the loan agreement with Dairy Holdings Limited. The amount initially borrowed from Dairy Holdings Limited is $NZ1.7 million out of a maximum of $4.8 million. The law firm Anthony Harper had certified that the loan was not contrary to the Memorandum of Agreement as the resource consent applications were not used as security. However, the loan agreement grants a sub-licence from CPWL to Dairy Holdings Limited to use the CPW water consents by taking water for irrigation from the Rakaia River. The sub-licence will start from the date the consents are granted to the date that the whole scheme is operational. The Christchurch City councillors voted (eight votes against, five votes for) not to accept the report.

A resource consent is specifically declared by the Resource Management Act 1991 not to be real or personal property. Resource consents are not 'owned'; they are 'held' by 'consent holders'.

The Central Plains Water Trust applications for resource consents may not have been technically used as security for the loan from Dairy Holdings Limited. However, the Christchurch City Council report clarifies that Dairy Holdings Limited, will now get the benefit of the first use of water from the Rakaia River, under the loan arrangement. That benefit will flow from the date the consents are granted, which will be some years before any of the 'ordinary' farmer shareholders in CPWL receive water, once the full scheme is constructed.

The concept of guaranteed public 'ownership' of the resource consents by Central Plains Water Trust, is somewhat of a fiction, given that a private company, Central Plains Water Limited, has an exclusive licence to operate the consents to take and use water for irrigation, and particularly given that Central Plains Water Limited has already granted a sublicence for the Rakaia River water to Dairy Holdings Limited.

== Local government elections October 2007 ==
The Central Plains Water enhancement scheme was the second most important issue in the 2007 Christchurch local government elections, according to a poll of 320 people commissioned by the Christchurch newspaper The Press.

Bob Parker, who became the new Mayor of Christchurch, favoured allowing the Central Plains Water scheme to proceed through the hearings into the resource consent applications.

Megan Woods, the unsuccessful Christchurch mayoral candidate, did not support the Central Plains Water scheme.

Sally Buck, a Christchurch City Councillor in the Fendalton Waimairi Ward, strongly opposed the Central Plains Water scheme.

Four new regional councillors elected to Canterbury Regional Council opposed the Central Plains Water scheme. The four were: David Sutherland and Rik Tindall, who stood as "Save Our Water" candidates, and independent candidates Jane Demeter and Eugenie Sage.

Richard Budd, a long-serving regional councillor, who had been a paid consultation facilitator for Central Plains Water, lost the Christchurch East ward to Sutherland and Tindall.

Defeated regional councillor Elizabeth Cunningham commented that she thought it unlikely that Central Plains Water scheme could be stopped by the new councillors as it was still proceeding to resource consent hearings where the new councillors would have little influence.

== Environmental effects ==
The proposed scheme has a number of environmental effects. The dam would result in a loss of habitat for the endangered Canterbury mudfish. The dam would also affect amenity and landscape values, especially for the settlement of Coalgate. Water abstraction from the rivers will have an effect on ecology and other natural characteristics. The intensification of farming as a result of water being made available by the scheme has led to fears of increased nitrate contamination of the aquifers.

=== Canterbury mudfish habitat ===
The Canterbury mudfish is a native freshwater fish of the galaxiid family that is found only in Canterbury. It is an acutely threatened species that is classified as 'Nationally Endangered'.

In October 2002, staff of the National Institute of Water and Atmospheric Research (NIWA), were engaged by Central Plains to survey fish populations in the Waianiwaniwa River catchment as part of the investigation into the potential dam site. The survey identified a large and abundant population of Canterbury mudfish that had previously been unknown. NIWA concluded that the dam would be problematic for the mudfish as their habitat would be replaced by an unsuitable reservoir and the remaining waterways would be opened to predatory eels. Although NIWA did no further work for Central Plains Water, much of NIWA's fish survey was included in the assessment of effects on the environment prepared by URS New Zealand Limited. However, a new approach to the effects on the mudfish was included. Mitigation of the loss of habitat would be further evaluated following consultation with the Department of Conservation.

In July 2006, and in January and February 2007, University of Canterbury researchers surveyed the Waianiwaniwa Valley for mudfish. The fish identified ranged from young recruits to mature adult fish, indicating a healthy population. Canterbury mudfish occur in at least 24 kilometres of the Waianiwaniwa River. Also, sites in the Waianiwaniwa Valley accounted for 47% of all fish database records known for Canterbury mudfish (based on mean catch per unit effort). Therefore, it was concluded that the Waianiwaniwa catchment is the most important known habitat for this species. Forest and bird's expert witness, Ecologist Colin Meurk concluded that the Waiainiwaniwa catchment "represents the largest known Canterbury mudfish habitat and is substantially larger than any other documented mudfish habitats. A rare combination of conditions makes the Waianiwaniwa River a unique ecosystem and creates an important whole catchment refuge for the conservation of this nationally threatened species".

Angus McIntosh, Associate Professor of Freshwater Ecology in the School of Biological Sciences at the University of Canterbury, presented evidence on behalf of the Department of Conservation. He disagreed with the CPW evidence on mudfish. He made three conclusions:

- The Waianiwaniwa Valley population of Canterbury mudfish (Neochanna burrowsius) is the largest and most important population of this nationally endangered fish in existence.
- The construction of the dam in the Waianiwaniwa Valley will eliminate the natural population and mudfish will not be able to live in the reservoir or any connected streams.
- CPW's proposed measures to mitigate the loss of the Waianiwaniwa population of Canterbury mudfish are inadequate to address the significance and characteristics of the mudfish population that would be lost and are largely undocumented.

== The hearing of the applications and submissions ==
The hearing, to decide the applications for resource consents sought from Canterbury Regional Council and Selwyn District Council and the notice of requirement for designation, commenced on 25 February 2008 and ended on 25 September 2008. The hearing was the largest ever held by Canterbury Regional Council. The hearing panel heard evidence from several hundred submitters on 71 days over a 2 1/2-year period at an expected cost of $2.1 million.

=== Council Officer’s reports ===
The summary Canterbury Regional Council report, by Principal Consents Advisor Leo Fietje, did not make a formal recommendation to either grant or decline the applications. However, it concluded, that on the basis of the applicant's evidence and the officer's reviews to date, that some adverse effects cannot be avoided, remedied or mitigated. Uncertainty remains over fish screens, natural character of the Waimakariri River, terrestrial ecology, and effects on lowland streams. Increased nitrate-nitrogen concentrations are considered significant. The loss of endangered Canterbury mudfish habitat due to the dam is considered to be a significant adverse effect. The report notes that any recommendations are not binding on the hearing panel, and that they may reach different conclusions on hearing further evidence.

The summary Selwyn District Council report, by Nick Boyes of Resource Management Group Ltd, recommended declining both the Notice of Requirement and the applications for land use consents. The report also noted that any recommendation was not binding on the hearing panel, and they may reach different conclusions on hearing further evidence. Several reasons for the recommendation were given. CPW has relied on ten management plans to mitigate adverse effects, but has not provided draft copies of any such plans. Insufficient information was provided, despite formal requests, for the Selwyn District Council witnesses to assess the significance of the social effects, the effects on archaeological and heritage values, effects on wetlands and terrestrial ecology, effects on water safety, and the effects on Ngai Tahu statutory acknowledgment areas. The cost-benefit-analysis, which was critical to the farmer-uptake and investment in, and therefore the viability of, the scheme, was considered to lack robustness and to overstate benefits and understate costs.

=== CPW evidence ===
In resource consent hearings the burden of proof generally falls on the consent applicant to satisfy a hearing panel that the purpose of the Resource Management Act is met by granting rather than refusing consent. Also, a burden of proof lies on any party who wishes a hearing panel (or the Environment Court) to make a determination of adverse or positive effects. A 'scintilla' of probative evidence may be enough to make an issue of a particular adverse effect 'live' and therefore requiring rebuttal if it is not to be found to be established. The Officers' reports, in noting several adverse effects, have moved the burden of proof for rebuttal onto the witnesses for Central Plains Water Trust.

The opening legal submission for Central Plains Water Trust summarised their technical evidence and concluded that any adverse effects of the scheme will either be adequately mitigated or will be insignificant in light of the positive economic benefits of the scheme. The expert witnesses for Central Plains have provided many reports of technical evidence.

=== Interim decision to decline dam ===
On 3 April 2009, the Commissioners released a minute stating that consents to dam the Wainiwaniwa River were unlikely to be granted and that the hearing would be resumed on 11 May 2009 to decide whether to proceed with a proposal not including water storage. The minute requested legal submissions on that point. Central Plains Water Limited chairman Pat Morrison stated that the most important short-term goal was to get the water takes from the Waimakariri and Rakaia rivers granted.

=== Implications for the scheme ===
CPW responded that the hearing should continue to consider the water take and associated canal consents and the notice of requirement. The Department of Conservation, the Fish and Game Council, the Royal Forest and Bird Protection Society and Te Runanga o Ngai Tahu (TRONT) all submitted that the hearing panel should close the hearing and decline all the consents applied for by CPW as these had been presented as an integrated proposal where water storage was fundamental. The Malvern Hills Protection Society recommended declining all applications, noting that CPW had obtained requiring authority status on the basis that the dam and reservoir were essential (para 14). The Society also noted that any water-take consents granted were likely to be ultimately transferred to Dairy Holdings Limited under existing loan agreements (para 29).

=== Revised divert and irrigate proposal ===
On 20 May 2009, the Hearing Panel decided that it would continue to hear evidence from CPW on a modified scheme from 5 October 2009. On 30 October 2009, the Commissioners announced that, subject to conditions, they considered they could issue resource consents and grant the Notice of Requirement for the revised scheme. They intended to convene again in early 2010 to finalise consent conditions and to complete a final decision.

=== Decision June 2010 ===
In June 2010, Environment Canterbury issue a press release stating that the hearing panel had granted 31 consents and the notice of requirement for the revised scheme without the storage dam. The full report of the hearing panel is available on the Environment Canterbury website.

By the end of June 2010, six appeals of the decision had been lodged with the Environment Court. Central Plains Water Trust lodged one of the appeals as applicant in order to change some consent conditions which limit the taking of water to 12 hours a day. Christchurch City Council's appeal was because it considered to much water would be taken from the Waimakariri River which may affect Christchurch's water supply. Fish and Game's appeal was motivated by concern over the Waimakariri River take and 'inadequate' fish screening conditions. Ngāi Tahus appeal concerned the Waimakariri River take and the legality of the change in scope of the consents granted from what had been applied for. Other appellants were a member of the Deans family and some extractors of river gravel.

In July 2012, the resource consents for the scheme were confirmed by the Environment Court.
