= Pineglades Naturist Club =

Naturist resort in New Zealand

Coordinates: 43°36′15″S 172°22′20″E

Pineglades Naturist Club is a naturist resort located in Rolleston, some 22 kilometres (14 mi) southwest of Christchurch in the South Island of New Zealand. It is situated on 7.4 hectares (18 acres) of landscaped parkland and comprises a clubhouse with recreational and camping facilities, an arboretum with nature walks, and approximately 60 baches, of which a small number are available for hire (the remainder being club members' holiday residences). Facilities include a swimming pool, spa and sauna complex, a lounge bar, a children's playground, and sports courts. Pineglades is clothing-optional and open throughout the year.

== History ==
=== Foundation ===
Pineglades Naturist Club began as the Canterbury Sun and Health Club, a non-landed organization who met in secret to visit secluded beaches in the nude – an activity which was then illegal in New Zealand. In July 1955 they purchased a block of land at Rolleston (then a small rural township) which had recently suffered a fire. Clearing and landscaping the block took some years, during which Pineglades Naturist Club became a founding member of the New Zealand Sunbathing Association (now the New Zealand Naturist Federation).

=== "Naked judge" scandal ===
In February 2016, complaints were laid with the Judicial Conduct Commission over photographs on the club's website of District Court judge David Saunders playing pétanque in the nude. Though Saunders' name was not published, the case drew national attention, with negative commentary from former government minister Rodney Hide and the Sensible Sentencing Trust, and support from TV host and fellow naturist Paul Henry. The Judicial Conduct Commissioner does not report on the outcomes of individual complaints made against judges, and no further action was made public with regard to the case. The Club in response reviewed its policy around photographs on its website. Saunders publicly identified himself as the judge involved upon being elected president of the New Zealand Naturist Federation in 2023 after his retirement from the bench.

== Community relations ==
Pineglades frequently hosts the New Zealand Naturist Federation's annual festival, a week-long sporting event held across the New Year. This festival is open to the general public as well as naturists. Pineglades regularly holds open days to promote naturism and attract new members; these events are often targeted at younger families. Each year on Waitangi Day the club challenges the local police and fire brigade to a volleyball tournament, held on club grounds.
