= Rolleston College =

Coordinates: 43.6042°S 172.3888°E

- Horoeka Haemata
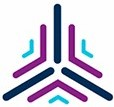

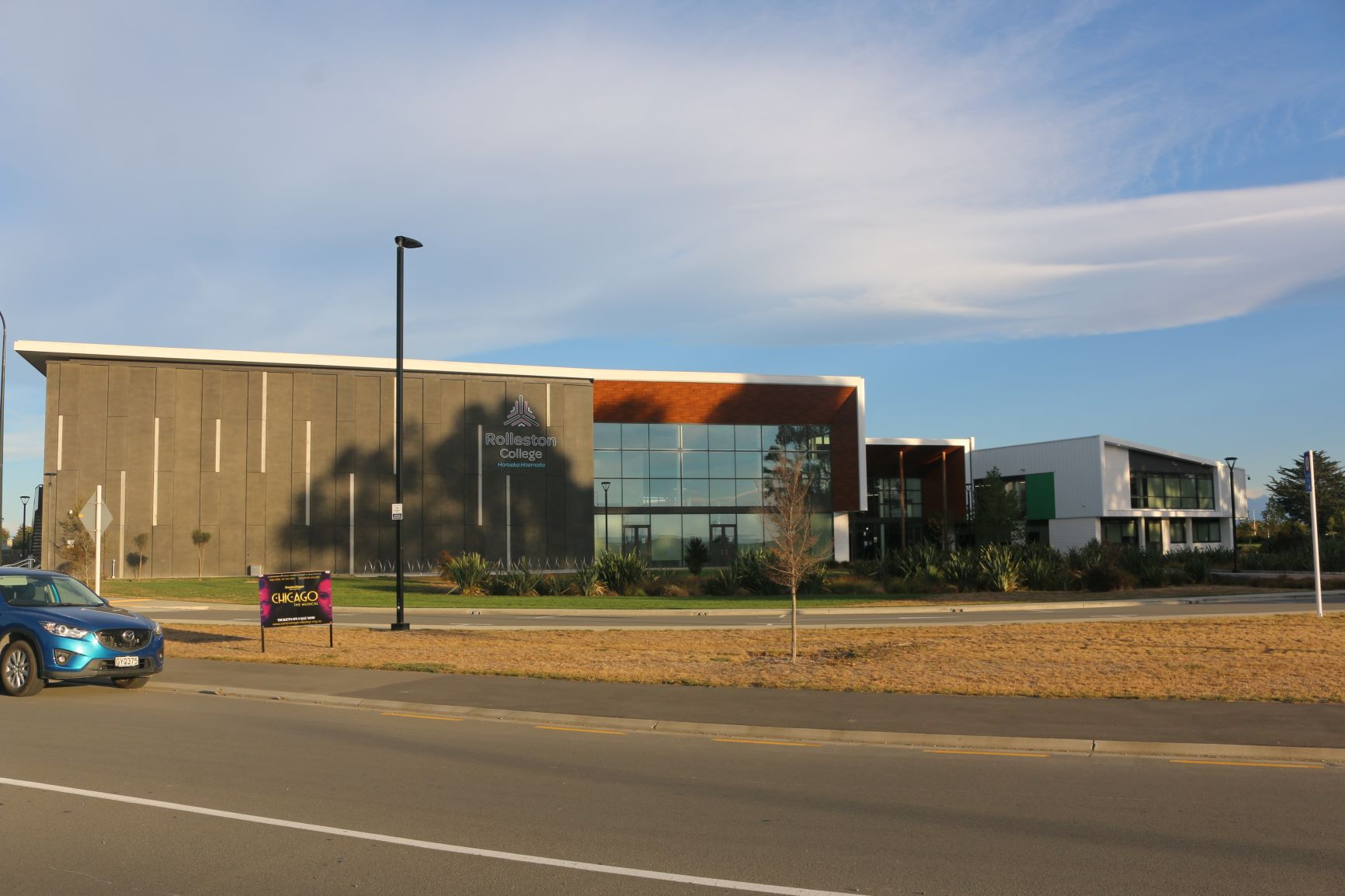
- Rolleston College in 2021

Location
- 631 Springston Rolleston Road; Canterbury; Rolleston, 7678

Information
- School type: State co-educational secondary (Year 9–13)
- Motto: Māori: He kākano i ruia mai i Rangiatea. (The seed will not be lost.)
- Opened: 30 January 2017; 9 years ago
- School board: Board of Trustees
- Ministry of Education Institution no.: 654
- Chairperson: Leanne Chapman
- Principal: Rachel Skelton
- Key people: Sophie Ralph, Cameron Winsloe, Raewyn Hooper, Ryan Wilson, Alby Wilson, Kelly Tippett, Seb Surry, Bronwyn Hoy, Sarah Forward
- Enrolment: 1,968 (July 2026)
- Website: https://www.rollestoncollege.nz/

Rolleston College is a co-educational state high school in the town of Rolleston, New Zealand. It is the only secondary school in the town. The school is one of the largest secondary schools in the South Island, with 1,783 students attending as of July 2026.

== History ==
Construction on the school began in July 2015, and was completed in January 2017.

Rolleston College was opened on 30 January 2017, and was initially open only to Year 9 students in the first year of secondary school. The school added year levels annually as the 2017 Year 9 cohort moved through; the school opened to all year levels (Years 9 to 13) in January 2021.

At the time of opening, Rolleston College was the first state high school to open in Canterbury in more than 30 years. Prior to Rolleston College's opening, the nearest secondary school to Rolleston was Lincoln High School in the town of Lincoln.

== Staff ==
The school consists of approximately 150 teachers, and 200 total staff. The current principal is Rachel Skelton who replaced the founding principal Steve Saville in 2020 after he stepped down in December 2019.

== Senior Campus expansion ==
In 2021, The Ministry of Education announced plans to create a second campus, as the original campus was not designed to cater for upwards of 1,500 students. The second campus was planned to house senior students, while the original campus would be exclusively for juniors. The second campus was officially opened in February 2026.

The decision to open a second campus was met with criticism, with some critics saying that opting to create a second secondary school in Rolleston would have been the more favorable decision.

Then-Minister of Education Chris Hipkins said at the end of 2021, when making the land purchase announcement, that the expansion would take the college’s capacity to about 3400 students. If the school reaches or exceeds its future capacity, it would make Rolleston College the largest school in New Zealand, beating out Rangitoto College in Auckland, which has around 3200 students.

== Enrolment ==
As of July 2026, Rolleston College has roll of 1,968 students, of which 280 (14.2%) identify as Māori.

As of 2026, the school has an Equity Index of 449, placing it amongst schools whose students have average socioeconomic barriers to achievement (roughly equivalent to deciles 5 and 6 under the former socio-economic decile system).
