= The Station, Rolleston =

New Zealand shopping centre

The Station
- Location: Rolleston, New Zealand
- Coordinates: 43°35′03″S 172°23′12″E
- Address: Jones Road
- Developer: Rolleston Industrial Holdings
- Owner: The Carter Group
- Num. of stores: 50
- Parking: 1,906

The Station is a planned shopping centre located in Rolleston, New Zealand. According to the developers, it will be 1.5 times bigger than Tower Junction (Christchurch's largest bulk retail complex), making this project the South Island's largest non-enclosed retail centre, with an area of 18 hectares (44 acres). Construction was scheduled to start in 2023. As of 2026, it has yet to happen.

== History ==
The name of the proposed retail centre was chosen to acknowledge Rolleston’s early history as a railway terminal.

Rolleston Industrial Holdings applied for resource consent with the Selwyn District Council in 2022. As of December 2022, further plans have not been released.

== Tenants ==
The development is set to have approximately 50 stores.

== Parking ==
The development has space for 1,906 car including 71 mobility bays, and 181 cycle parks.

The Station plan also includes space for a potential park-and-ride facility and bus station, alongside Rolleston’s existing city-bound railway station.

== See also ==
- List of shopping centres in New Zealand
