= Izone, Rolleston =

Industrial area in Canterbury, New Zealand

Izone
- Suburb
- Interactive map of Izone
- Coordinates: 43.584°S 172.380°E
- Country: New Zealand
- Region: Canterbury
- Territorial authority: Selwyn District
- Ward: Rolleston
- Electorates: Selwyn; Te Tai Tonga (Māori)

Government
  - Territorial authority: Selwyn District Council
  - Regional council: Environment Canterbury
  - Mayor of Selwyn: Lydia Gliddon
  - Selwyn MP: Nicola Grigg
  - Te Tai Tonga MP: Tākuta Ferris

Area
  - Total: 4.07 km^{2} (1.57 sq mi)

Population (June 2025)
  - Total: 60
  - Density: 15/km^{2} (38/sq mi)
- Time zone: UTC+12 (New Zealand Standard Time)
  - Summer (DST): UTC+13 (New Zealand Daylight Time)

Izone is an industrial suburb of Rolleston in Selwyn District, Canterbury Region, New Zealand.

== History ==
Izone was proposed by Selwyn District Council in August 2000 to attract business to their district. The council bought 130 hectares (320 acres) of rural land in April 2001 to start the venture. One year later, the council signed up The Warehouse Group to have their South Island distribution centre established on the site. The distribution centre, which opened in June 2003, was built for the council by Naylor Love and later sold it to an investment fund. It was the largest single-storey building in the South Island at 34,000 square metres (370,000 sq ft) and was extended by another 15,000 square metres (160,000 sq ft) in 2016.

By 2010, Izone was New Zealand's biggest industrial subdivision. In 2015, Port of Lyttelton and Port of Tauranga both built container handling facilities at Izone. Port of Lyttelton did so because the Christchurch Southern Motorway had caused congestion on Brougham Street, slowing down access to Canterbury's port. Port of Tauranga did so because it owns a half-share in PrimePort Timaru. Both these South Island ports are accessible via the Main South Line. The PrimePort facility opened in July 2015 and Lyttelton's MidlandPort opened in June 2016.

== Location and access ==
Izone is framed on two sides by railway lines. The Main South Line forms the southern boundary and the Midland Line forms the south-western boundary. Parallel to and just beyond the Main South Line is State Highway 1, and beyond the highway is the township of Rolleston.

The intersection on State Highway 1 that is formed with Hoskyns Road was signalised in March 2007. As State Highway 1 segregates the township from its industrial subdivision, a bridge is planned to connect Rolleston with Izone to be constructed in 2021.

== Demographics ==
Rolleston Izone statistical area covers 4.07 km^{2} (1.57 sq mi). It had an estimated population of 60 as of June 2025, with a population density of 14.7 people per km^{2}.

Historical population
Year	Pop.	±% p.a.
2006	63	—
2013	63	+0.00%
2018	45	−6.51%
2023	45	+0.00%
The 2006 population is for a smaller area of 2.43 km^{2}. Source:

Rolleston Izone had a population of 45 in the 2023 New Zealand census, unchanged since the 2018 census, and a decrease of 18 people (−28.6%) since the 2013 census. There were 24 males and 18 females in 18 dwellings. 13.3% of people identified as LGBTIQ+. The median age was 32.2 years (compared with 38.1 years nationally). There were 6 people (13.3%) aged under 15 years, 18 (40.0%) aged 15 to 29, and 21 (46.7%) aged 30 to 64.

People could identify as more than one ethnicity. The results were 80.0% European (Pākehā), 13.3% Māori, and 6.7% Asian. English was spoken by 86.7%, and other languages by 6.7%. New Zealand Sign Language was known by 6.7%. The percentage of people born overseas was 20.0, compared with 28.8% nationally.

The sole religious affiliation given was 13.3% Christian. People who answered that they had no religion were 73.3%, and 6.7% of people did not answer the census question.

Of those at least 15 years old, 3 (7.7%) people had a bachelor's or higher degree, 27 (69.2%) had a post-high school certificate or diploma, and 9 (23.1%) people exclusively held high school qualifications. The median income was $45,200, compared with $41,500 nationally. 3 people (7.7%) earned over $100,000 compared to 12.1% nationally. The employment status of those at least 15 was 24 (61.5%) full-time and 3 (7.7%) part-time.
