= Te Ara Ātea =

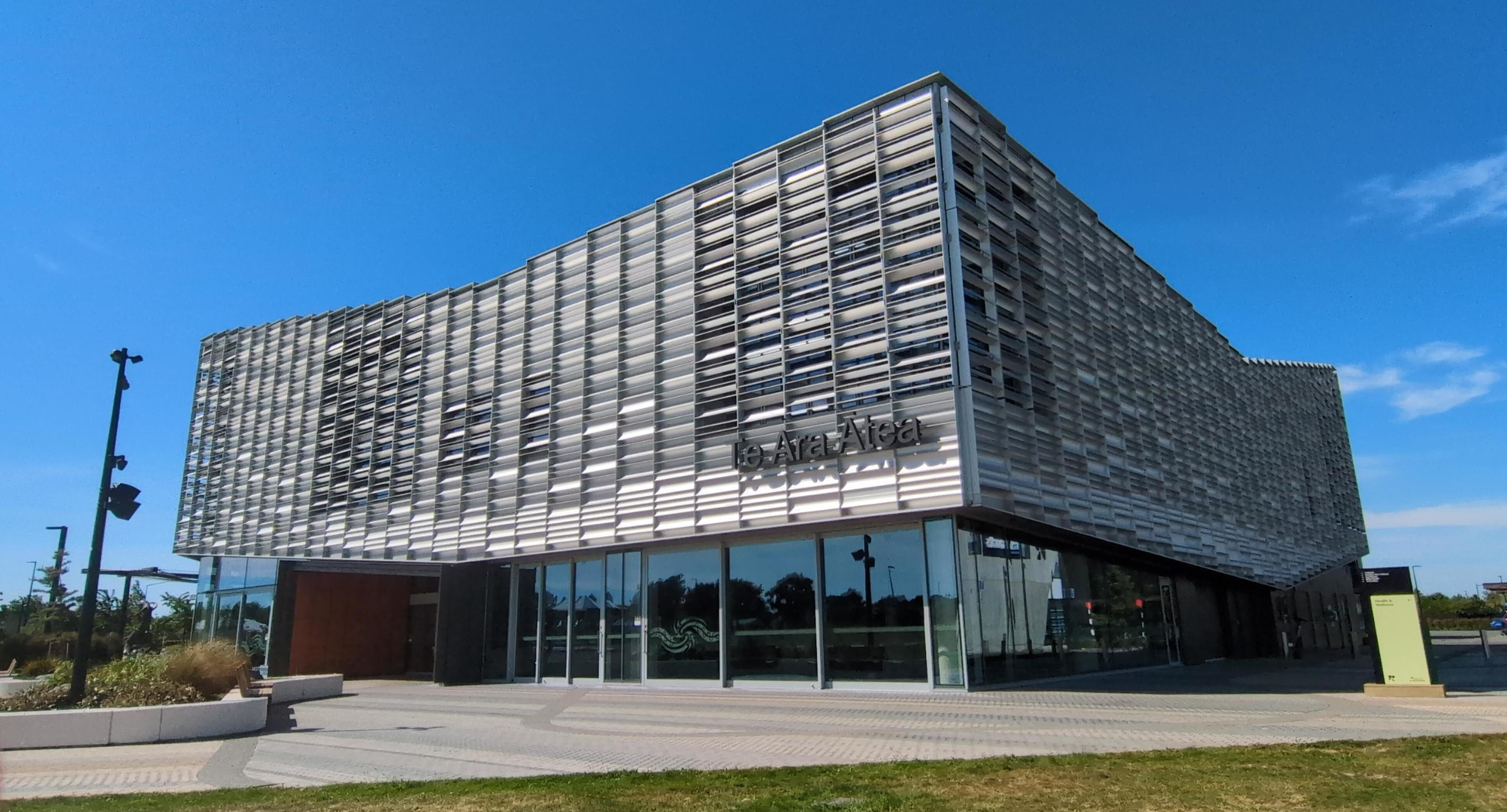
- Te Ara Ātea in 2025
- Alternative names: Rolleston Library

General information
- Status: Open
- Type: multi-purpose cultural and community centre
- Location: 56 Tennyson Street, Rolleston 7614, Rolleston
- Coordinates: 43.5948951°S 172.3820669°E
- Opened: 2 December 2021
- Cost: $22.7 million NZD
- Owner: Selwyn District Council

Technical details
- Floor count: 2 storeys
- Floor area: 2200 square metres

Design and construction
- Architects: Warren and Mahoney
- Awards and prizes: WAF Prize Sponsor

Te Ara Ātea is a multi-function cultural and community centre in the town of Rolleston, New Zealand. It houses workshops, performance spaces, art and museum exhibitions including nationally significant taonga, and a modern library. It opened on 2 December 2021, with the library and community spaces replacing the library and community spaces that were previously part of the Rolleston Community Centre. The two-storey building has 2200 square metres of space. Te Ara Ātea is designed to be the manawa or heart of Rolleston's town centre.

== History ==
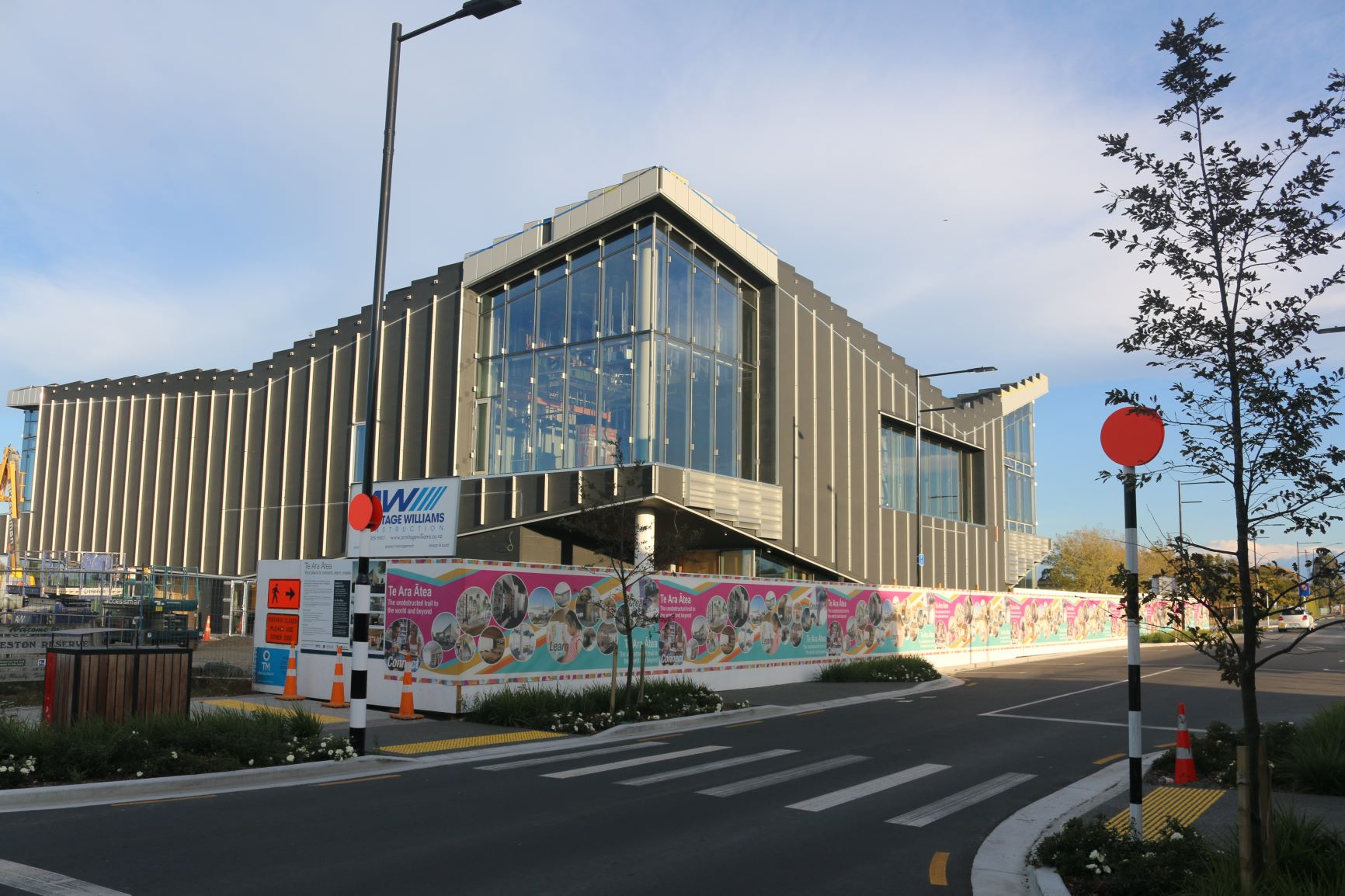
Construction of the library in 2021

Construction of Te Ara Ātea was completed on 4 November 2021. The building opened on 2 December 2021.

The building and landscape were designed by architects Warren and Mahoney, and cost $22.7 million to construct. The building houses the town’s new library along with art and museum spaces, workshops, meeting rooms and a dedicated performance space with lighting and gantries to host exhibitions and performing arts. The building also houses New Zealand’s largest video wall, screening art works and videos depicting landscapes of the district Prior to the opening of Te Ara Ātea, Rolleston Library shared premises with the Rolleston Community Centre.

Te Ara Ātea won an award from the Designers Institute of New Zealand for its design.

Jonathan Coote, the project principal on the building, says the facility has been designed closely with a great deal of engagement to allow for future flexibility: “Te Ara Ātea acts as a beacon, not only in location, but for the diverse and growing Selwyn District community it serves. The multi-functional space encourages and facilitates community gathering, activities, recreation and reflection. The design outcome that has been achieved with this project is a testament to a strong cultural narrative, coupled with a people-centric approach.”

== Naming ==
The name of the community/cultural centre was gifted to the community by Te Taumutu Rūnanga, and means "the unobstructed trail to the world and beyond". Te Taumutu Rūnanga worked in collaboration with Selwyn District Council on the $22.7 million building and landscape.

=== Naming controversy ===
Several conversations within the community have discussed the naming of Te Ara Ātea. A group have complained that the name is not recognisable to the large majority of New Zealanders, and argue that adding "Library" under the signage would help avoid confusion. In its first year of being open, the buildings door counters registered 171,673 visits to Te Ara Ātea, and the library in the building saw a 125% increase in new members compared to the previous year at Rolleston Library, along with increased book loans and higher attendance at library events. In response to requests from the Rolleston Residents’ Association, Selwyn District Council agreed to add further pictorial signage around the main entrance way and digital signage in the front windows to advertise the services available in the building, including the library.
