= Boobs on Bikes =

Annual topless motorcycle parade in New Zealand

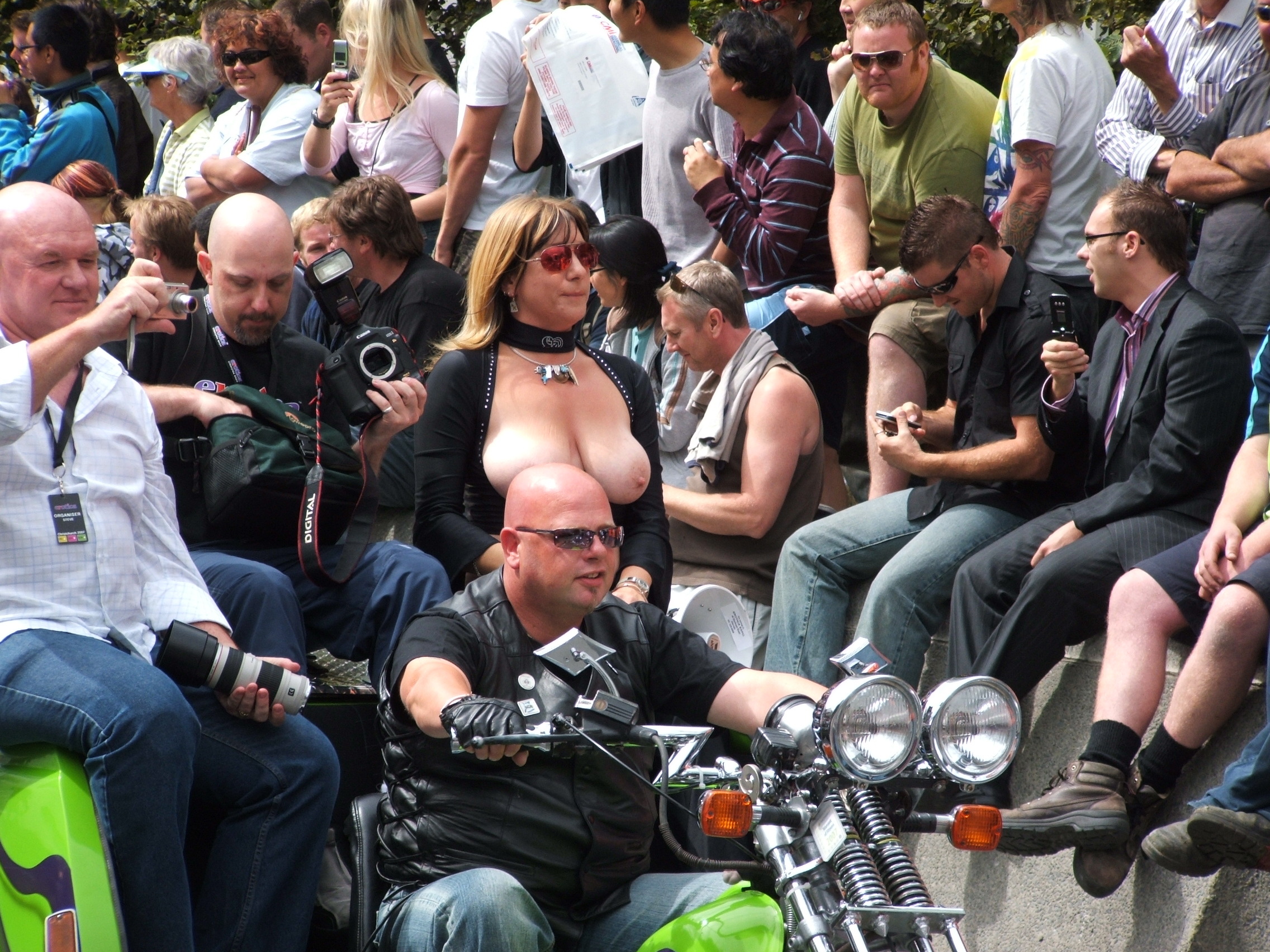
Boobs on Bikes, 2007

Boobs on Bikes is a mostly annual parade of topless men and women riding on motorcycles through large New Zealand cities (in the past, Christchurch, Palmerston North, Hamilton, Tauranga, Wellington, Wanganui and most prominently Auckland).

It is organised by pornographer Steve Crow, and started in Auckland in 2003 after two local women were arrested for baring their breasts in a public protest. Crow considered this to be a breach of the New Zealand Bill of Rights Act 1990, which specifically prohibits discrimination on the basis of sex and Crow argued that if it is legal in New Zealand for a male to bare his breast in public, the same must apply to women. Several legal attempts to stop the parade, most notably by Auckland City Council, have failed in court and the parade has been ruled legal under New Zealand legislation.

Crow has run his Boobs on Bikes parade a number of times since 2003. The event normally precedes Crow's Erotica Expo, or as it is more correctly known, Erotica Lifestyles Expo, an adults-only adult lifestyles exhibition. International porn stars who travel to New Zealand for the expo are typically part of Boobs on Bikes.

== 2006 Auckland ==
In 2006, the parade, then much smaller and less known, made headlines in Auckland, when Steve Crow asked for permission from the city council, which was granted. Strong political opposition later materialized from parts of the public and some politicians, including mayor Dick Hubbard and most of the Auckland City Councillors. Legal experts, however, concluded that the parade could not be denied by current laws (bare-breasted women not being an indecency in New Zealand in this age, as a police spokesman noted). Also, the organizers had asked only for assistance with traffic control for the parade and declared themselves determined to go ahead even in the face of opposition.

The acrimonious debate about the parade ensured that when the parade took place several weeks later, Queen Street was packed with spectators. Rough counts estimate around one hundred thousand people, of which about one fifth were reported to be female. The 2006 parade contained about fifteen to twenty female pornstars on 26 bikes and two decommissioned army tanks.

== 2007 Christchurch ==
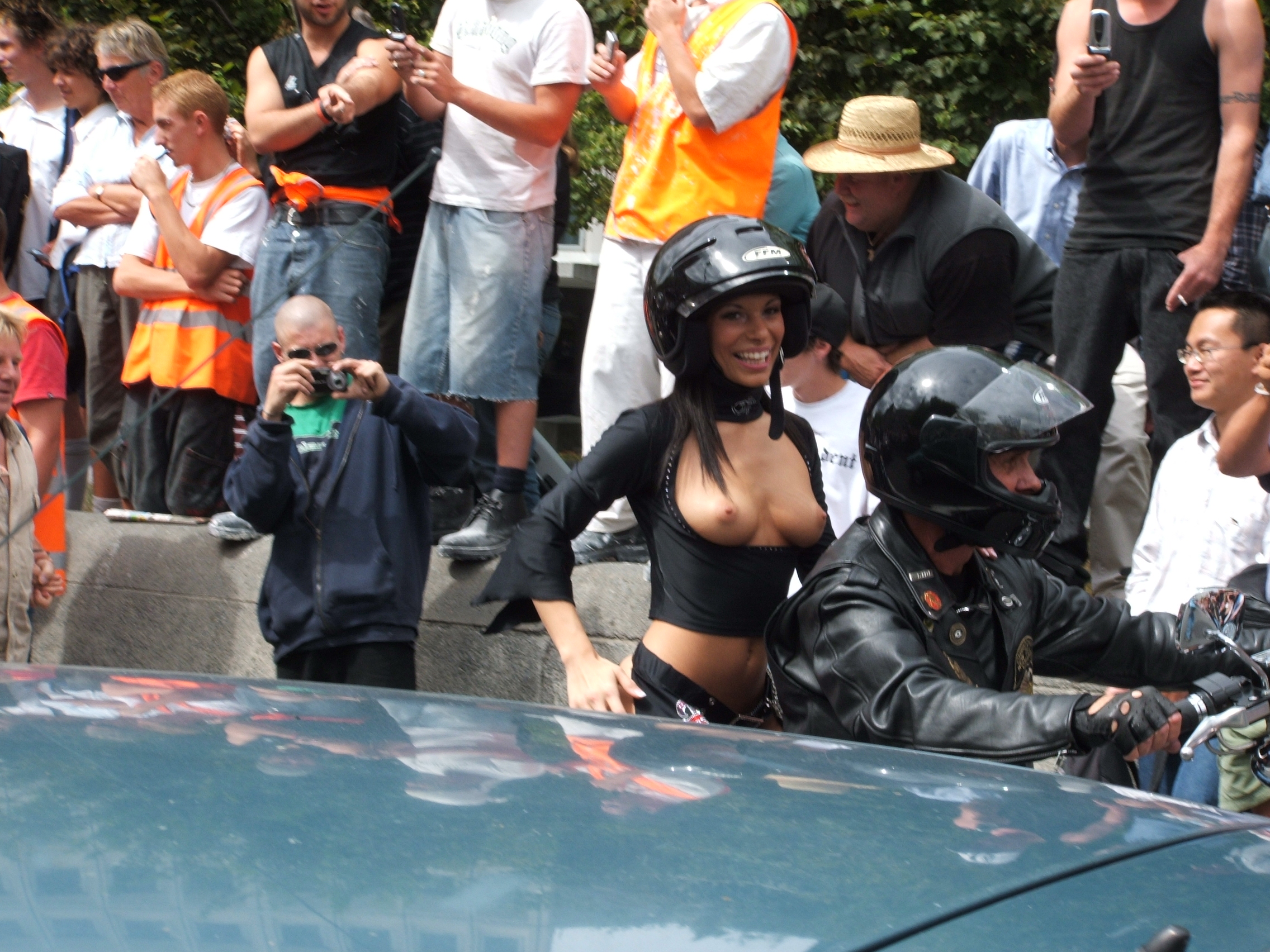
Boobs on Bikes event, 2007

The 2007 Christchurch "Boobs on Bikes" parade was held on 2 March. This parade received less national media attention than the Auckland parade the year before, as unlike in Auckland, there was no attempt by city councillors to prevent it. However, Christchurch City Council did release a press statement stating that they had "not approved or received an application to hold the proposed 'Boobs on Bikes' parade on Friday, 2 March, from Erotica event organisers." The press release stated that the council must be consulted for any procession that will interfere with traffic, or may require crowd management. Erotica Lifestyle Expo organiser Steve Crow has brushed this off, saying that it is a promotion, not a parade, and all rules of the road will be observed.

City council and organizers of the event say they had received numerous complaints about the parade; however, it isn't in the city's jurisdiction to act, as female toplessness is not illegal in New Zealand. Council transport and streets manager Michael Aitken told NZPA that the "standard of dress of participants is not a matter that the Council can control."

Police inspector Gary Knowles commented that it was a "moral not a criminal issue. We have taken legal advice and unless there is a breach of the peace, we cannot intervene."

== Opposition in Whanganui ==
In March 2010, the Protect Our Youth Association began soliciting signatures for a petition against the parade, however, the petition effort was abandoned after then Whanganui Mayor Michael Laws stated to P.O.Y.A. representative Holly Dahya that he would ignore any petitions against the parade, and rejected any alternative recourse to council. Laws also rejected Wanganui City Councillor Allan Anderson's attempts to open discussion on the issue within Council itself, recognising that repeated attempts by Auckland City Council to prevent the event had failed.

Crow also angered Palmerston North RSA members when he announced his parades in Palmerston North, Whanganui and Levin would take place over ANZAC weekend, with the Erotica Lifestyle Expo in Palmerston North scheduled for ANZAC day itself. In response to critics, Crow stated that it was an 'unfortunate clash of date' outside his control as that weekend (ANZAC weekend) was the only weekend available for the use of the venue.

== See also ==
- National Cleavage Day
- Topfreedom
