= Rolleston, New Zealand =

Town in the South Island of New Zealand

Rolleston Roretana, Tauwharekākaho (Māori)
- Town
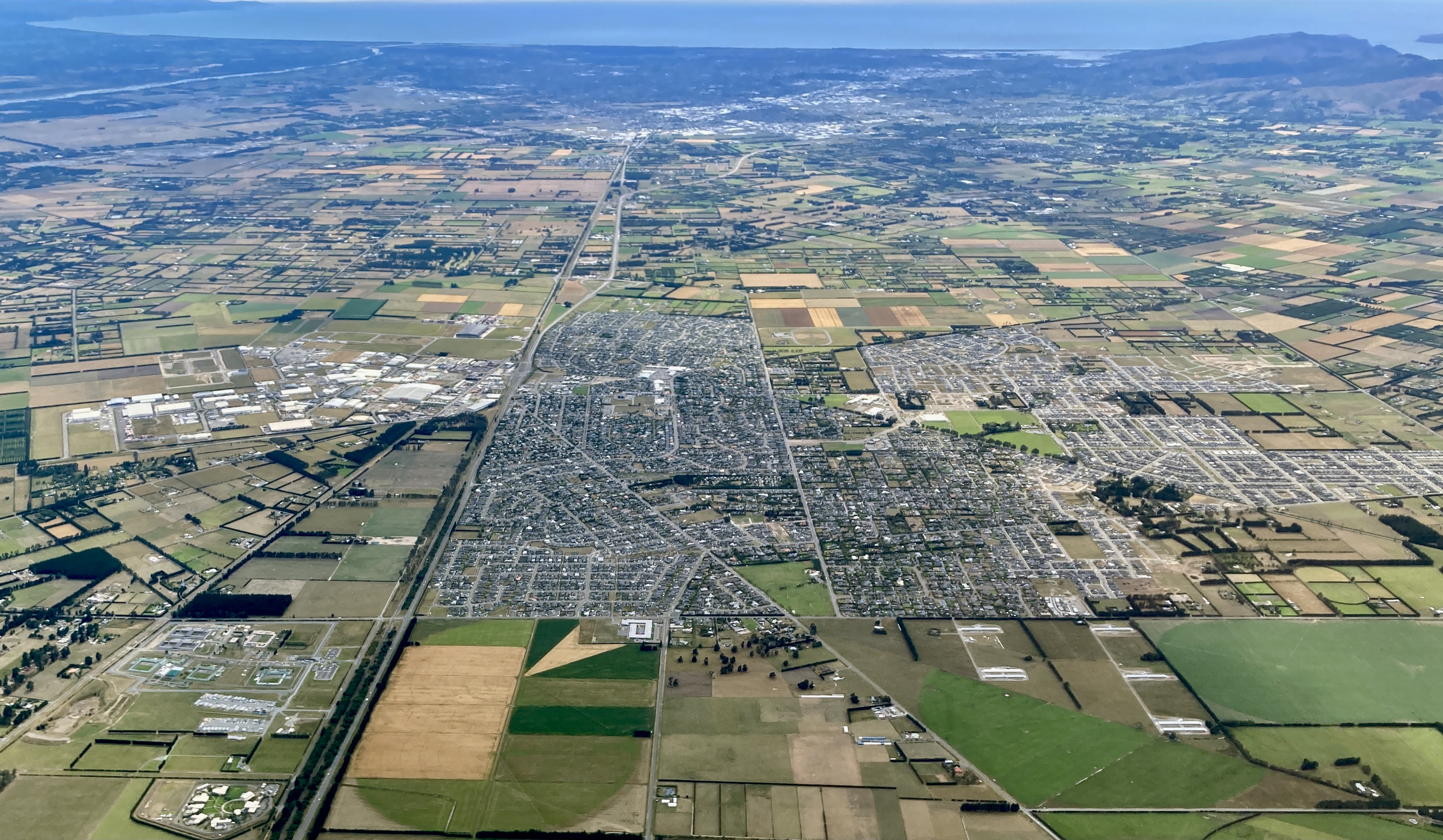
- Rolleston from the air looking north-east to Christchurch
- Interactive map of Rolleston
- Coordinates: 43°35′S 172°23′E
- Country: New Zealand
- Island: South Island
- Region: Canterbury
- Territorial authority: Selwyn District
- Ward: Rolleston
- Electorates: Selwyn; Te Tai Tonga (Māori)

Government
  - Territorial authority: Selwyn District Council
  - Regional council: Environment Canterbury
  - Mayor of Selwyn: Lydia Gliddon
  - Selwyn MP: Nicola Grigg
  - Te Tai Tonga MP: Mananui Ramsden

Area
  - Total: 23.71 km^{2} (9.15 sq mi)
- Elevation: 50 m (160 ft)

Population (June 2025)
  - Total: 34,100
  - Density: 1,440/km^{2} (3,720/sq mi)
- Time zone: UTC+12 (NZST)
  - Summer (DST): UTC+13 (NZDT)
- Postcode(s): 7614, 7615
- Local iwi: Ngāi Tahu

Rolleston (/ˈrɒləstən/; Māori: Roretana, Tauwharekākaho) is the seat and largest town in the Selwyn District, in the Canterbury region of New Zealand's South Island. It is located on the Canterbury Plains 22 kilometres (14 mi) south-west of Christchurch, and is part of the wider Christchurch metropolitan area.

Rolleston is one of the fastest growing towns in New Zealand, having grown from a population of around 2,800 in 2001 to around 28,000 in 2023. The town has a population of 34,100 (June 2025), making it New Zealand's 21st-largest urban area and the second-largest in Canterbury (behind Christchurch).

== History ==
Rolleston originated as a railway terminus in 1866, and is named after the Canterbury statesman William Rolleston. Rolleston, who was born in Yorkshire in 1831 and died in 1903, served as Superintendent of the Province of Canterbury from 1868 until 1876 (when central government abolished the New Zealand provinces). He also served as a Member of Parliament, holding various Cabinet portfolios.

In the 1970s, Prime Minister Norman Kirk had a dream of turning the town of fewer than 1,000 people into a city of 80,000. He nicknamed it the "Town of the Future", however the single "Town of the Future" sign has long since been removed from the entrance to Rolleston.

Selwyn District Council proposed an industrial subdivision, Izone, in 2000. The council purchased rural land adjacent to the Main South Line opposite the town the following year. The Warehouse Group developed its South Island distribution centre at the Izone.

The Selwyn District Council built the Toka Hāpai Selwyn Health Hub in 2021. The Health Hub was completed in May 2021, and has a Canterbury District Health Board Primary Birthing Unit as well as Pacific Radiology, a physiotherapist and may have a general practice service. It was estimated to cost $14.7 million.

In late 2020, the Selwyn District Council were considering applications (private plan changes) to rezone land around Rolleston to accommodate a further 4500 houses. The Christchurch City Council was opposing this until concerns about the “significant adverse effects of downstream traffic within Christchurch” could be addressed.

In 2021, an $85 million shopping centre called Rolleston Fields was planned to be built on the old Rolleston domain on Tennyson Street. It is expected to form part of a new town centre that has been master planned by the Selwyn District Council. It is expected to include cinemas and a covered farmers market. It is planned to be built in four stages. The Selwyn District Council is planning to also build a pedestrian square to provide an "identifiable heart" of the town.

== Christchurch earthquakes ==
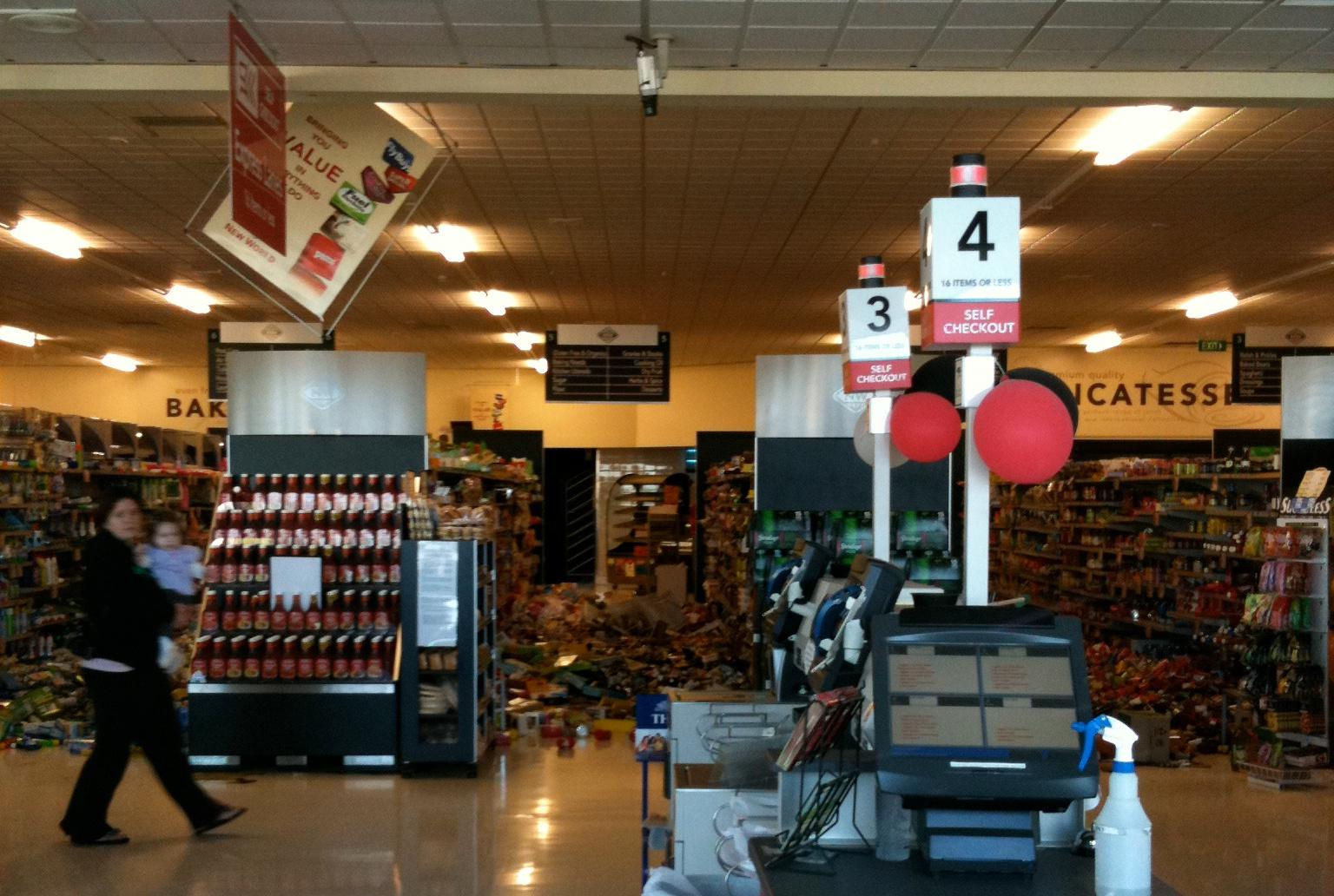
New World Rolleston following the 2010 Canterbury earthquake

Rolleston was close to the epicentre of the 2010 Canterbury earthquake being near the end of the Greendale Fault, experiencing movement two times the strength of that in Christchurch City. Residents were without power following the quake, some for more than 48 hours, and were required to boil water for weeks before services were restored. Rolleston was close to many of the aftershocks following the September quake.

Rolleston suffered low damage due to the ground having underlying stones and stable rock. For such reasons, Rolleston had not been affected by liquefaction, and only a few houses had been condemned and demolished from earthquake damage.

The 2011 Christchurch earthquake caused a minor amount of extra damage, mostly to buildings which had already been affected.

The population of Rolleston has expanded rapidly since the Christchurch earthquakes due to the land stability and fast tracking of building consents by the Selwyn District Council.

== Amenities ==
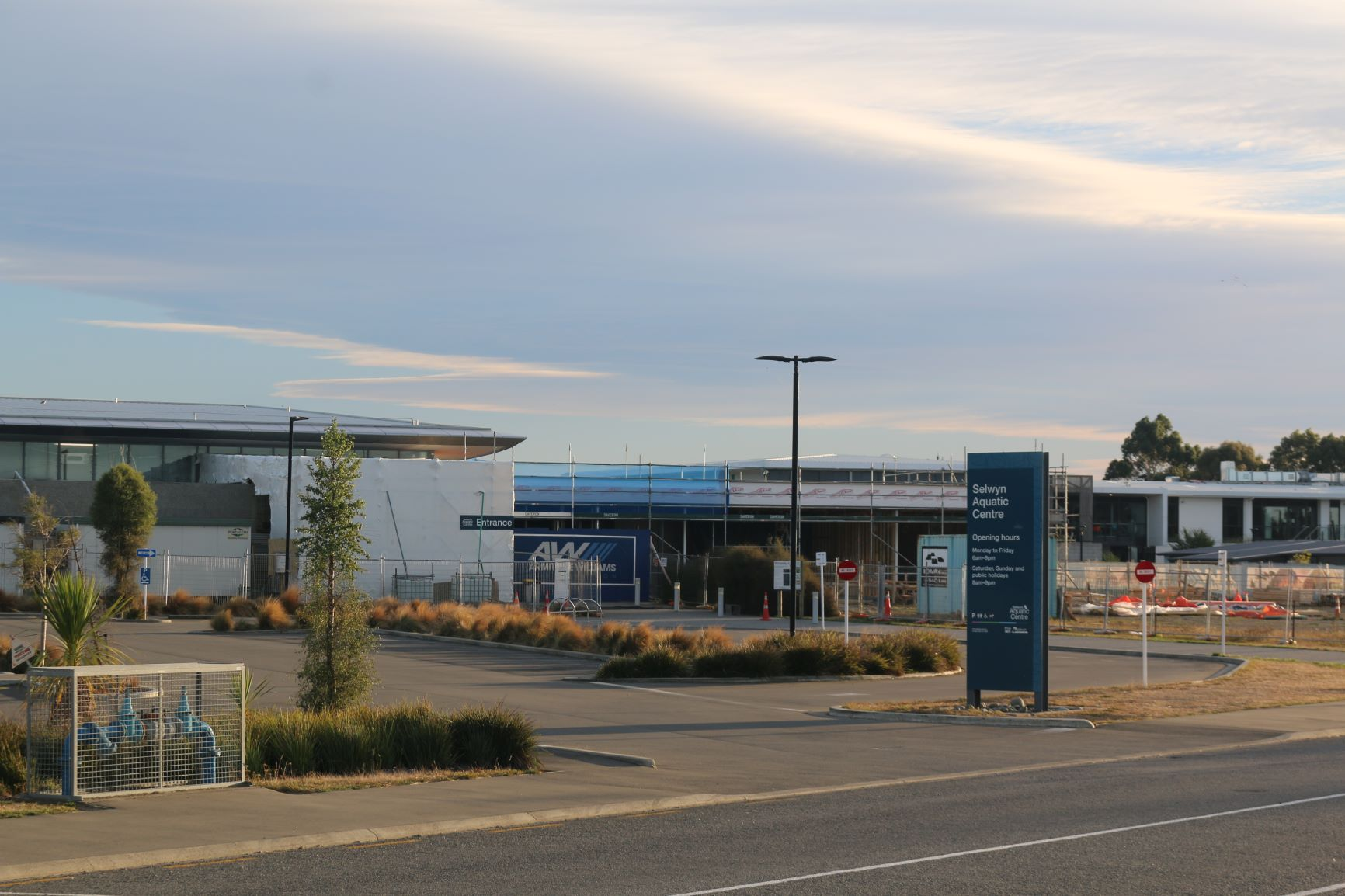
The Selwyn Aquatic Centre. Undergoing redevelopment April 2021

Rolleston is home to Pineglades Naturist Club, the South Island's largest naturist resort.

The Selwyn Aquatic Centre has five pools including a 25-metre pool with ten lanes.

Foster Park, Brookside Park and Rolleston Reserve provide sports grounds for many sports including cricket, softball, baseball, hockey, football, rugby, rugby league, athletics, tennis and netball. Foster Park also includes an off-leash dog exercise area.

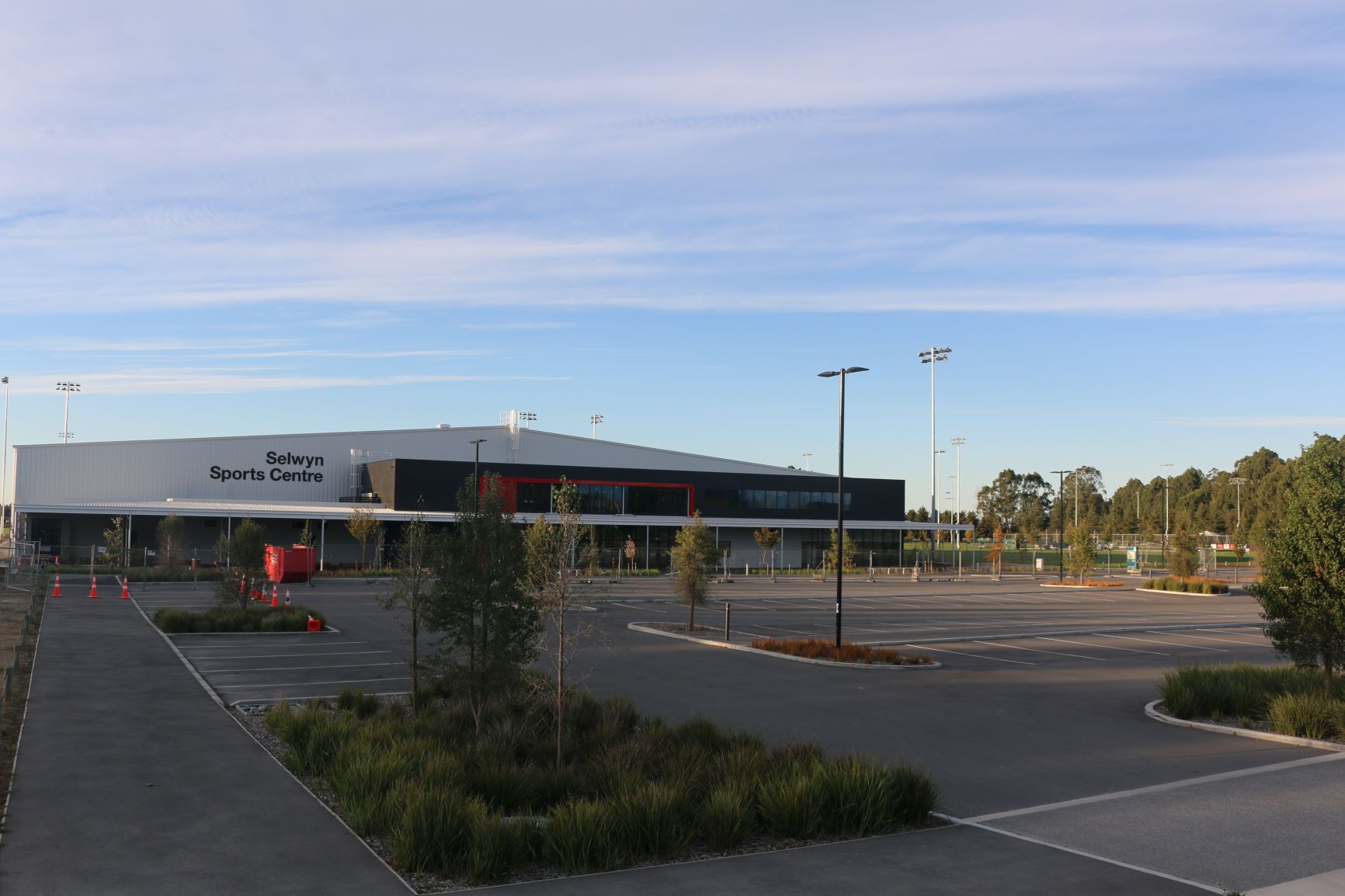
Selwyn Sports Centre in 2021

The Rolleston public library, Te Ara Ātea, opened in December 2021. The $22.2 million building was designed by architects Warren and Mahoney. The two storied 2200 square metre building is expected to be the centrepiece of Rolleston's town centre. Prior to its opening the library shared premises with the Rolleston Community Centre.

The Selwyn Sports Centre, the largest sports centre in Canterbury, opened on 2 May 2021. It has eight indoor courts and an indoor walking track.

Rolleston is set to build the South Island's biggest retail complex called The Station.

== Climate ==
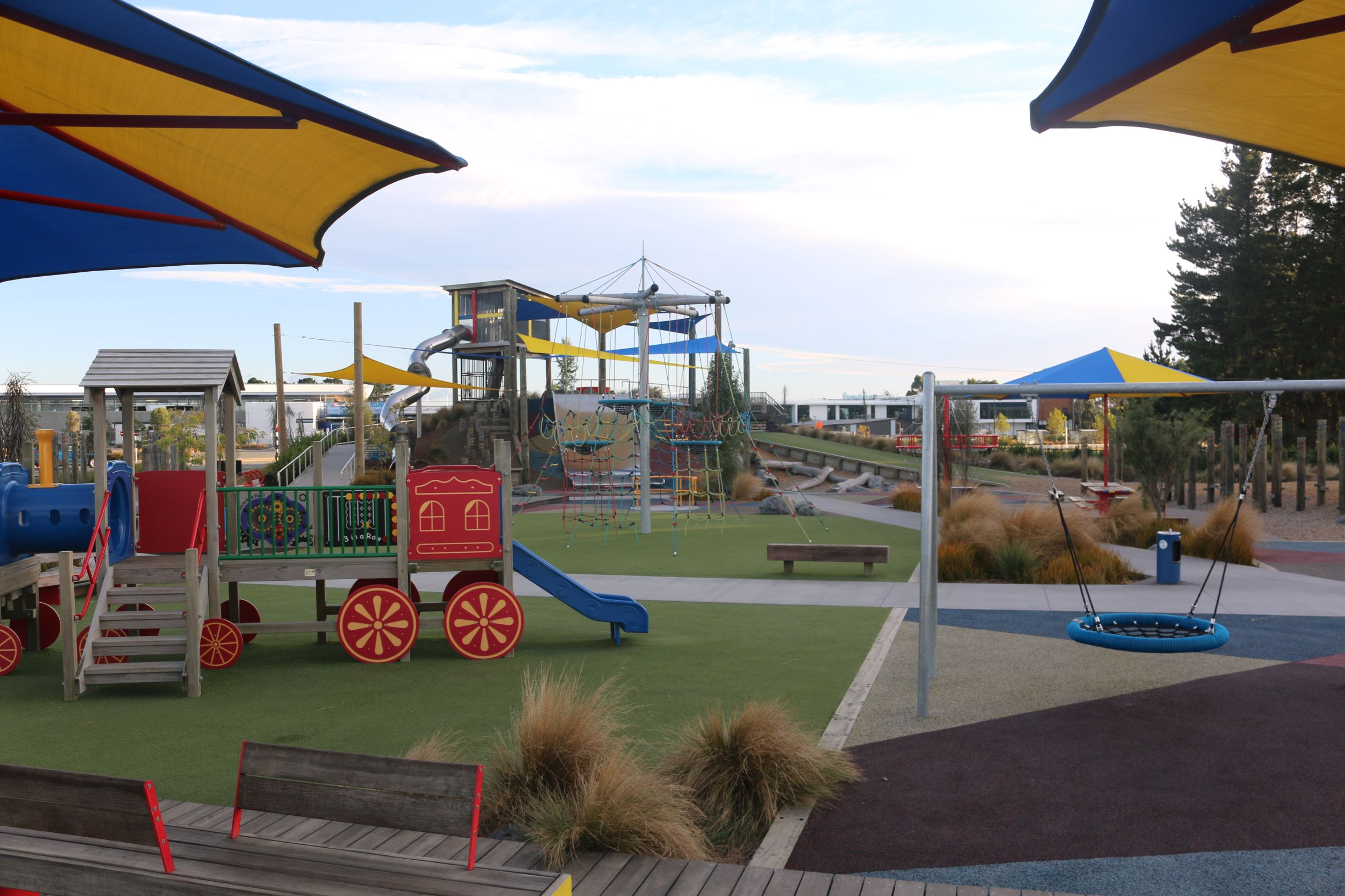
Foster Park in Autumn

The radiata pine plantations that were once a feature of this part of Canterbury have largely been replaced by more water-intensive grazing land to take advantage of the "dairy boom" of the early 21st century. Shelter belts of radiata, another significant earlier feature of the Plains (and very effective at mitigating the desiccating effects of the nor'west wind), have also been removed as they formed a barrier to the huge central-pivot irrigators that are now commonplace in the area. Rolleston is very exposed on the Canterbury Plains and is therefore slightly drier, with a more continental climate, than nearby Christchurch. There are many vineyards in the area.

The warmest month of the year is January with an average high temperature of 23 °C. The coldest month of the year occurs in July, when the average high temperature is 10 °C. Monthly rainfall ranges between an average of 33mm in January to 56mm in July. On 26 January 2021, a maximum temperature of 39.2 °C (102.6 °F) was registered.

== Demographics ==
Rolleston is described by Statistics New Zealand as a medium urban area, and covers 23.71 km^{2} (9.15 sq mi). It had an estimated population of 34,100 as of June 2025, with a population density of 1,438 people per km^{2}.

Historical population
Year	Pop.	±% p.a.
1996	1,520	—
2001	2,760	+12.67%
2006	5,022	+12.72%
2013	9,615	+9.72%
2018	17,541	+12.78%
2023	28,449	+10.15%
The 2006 population is for a smaller area of 22.08 km^{2}. Earlier populations may be for different boundaries. Source:

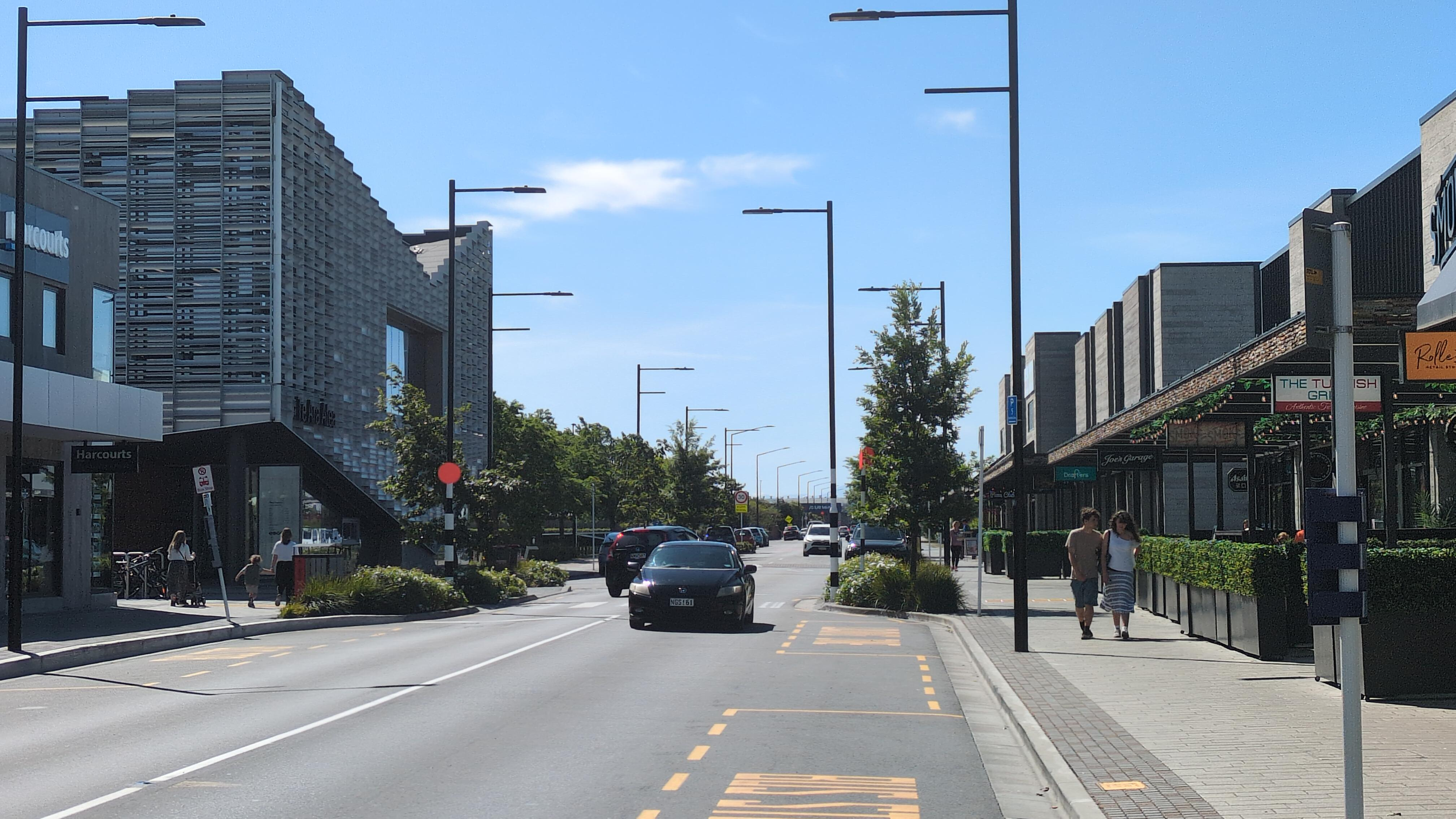
Tennyson Street in Rolleston Town Centre has undergone extensive development in the 2020s

Until 1990 the town had only a few sealed streets and a population of just under 1,000. The current expansion began in the 1990s.

Rolleston had a population of 28,449 in the 2023 New Zealand census, an increase of 10,908 people (62.2%) since the 2018 census, and an increase of 18,834 people (195.9%) since the 2013 census. There were 14,040 males, 14,337 females, and 75 people of other genders in 9,243 dwellings. 3.0% of people identified as LGBTIQ+. The median age was 33.6 years (compared with 38.1 years nationally). There were 7,029 people (24.7%) aged under 15 years, 5,184 (18.2%) aged 15 to 29, 14,037 (49.3%) aged 30 to 64, and 2,202 (7.7%) aged 65 or older.

People could identify as more than one ethnicity. The results were 75.3% European (Pākehā); 10.3% Māori; 3.5% Pasifika; 18.8% Asian; 2.4% Middle Eastern, Latin American and African New Zealanders (MELAA); and 2.9% other, which includes people giving their ethnicity as "New Zealander". English was spoken by 95.2%, Māori by 1.6%, Samoan by 0.7%, and other languages by 19.0%. No language could be spoken by 3.2% (e.g. too young to talk). New Zealand Sign Language was known by 0.6%. The percentage of people born overseas was 30.6, compared with 28.8% nationally.

Religious affiliations were 29.5% Christian, 3.3% Hindu, 1.3% Islam, 0.2% Māori religious beliefs, 0.9% Buddhist, 0.3% New Age, and 3.6% other religions. People who answered that they had no religion were 55.3%, and 5.8% of people did not answer the census question.

Of those at least 15 years old, 5,589 (26.1%) people had a bachelor's or higher degree, 11,535 (53.9%) had a post-high school certificate or diploma, and 4,302 (20.1%) people exclusively held high school qualifications. The median income was $55,400, compared with $41,500 nationally. 3,009 people (14.0%) earned over $100,000 compared to 12.1% nationally. The employment status of those at least 15 was 13,746 (64.2%) full-time, 2,736 (12.8%) part-time, and 432 (2.0%) unemployed.

Individual statistical areas
Name	Area (km^{2})	Population	Density (per km^{2})	Dwellings	Median age	Median income
Rolleston North Central	1.51	4,134	2,738	1,314	33.7 years	$55,500
Rolleston Central	1.65	3,747	2,271	1,206	35.8 years	$50,600
Rolleston Tauwharekākaho	1.38	2,712	1,965	888	36.3 years	$51,500
Rolleston North East	1.59	2,337	1,470	765	36.6 years	$54,600
Rolleston South West	1.86	1,668	897	555	35.4 years	$57,200
Rolleston South Central	1.56	2,556	1,638	798	37.4 years	$55,500
Faringdon	3.57	5,553	1,555	1,830	32.1 years	$56,700
Rolleston South East	6.52	5,697	871	1,863	31.4 years	$58,300
Rolleston Izone	4.07	45	11	18	32.2 years	$45,200
New Zealand					38.1 years	$41,500

== Education ==
Rolleston has seven full primary (year 1–8) schools:

- Clearview Primary School is a state school with a roll of approximately 833 students. The school opened in 2010.
- Lemonwood Grove School is a state school with a roll of approximately 1,147 students. The school opened in 2017.
- Rolleston School is a state school with a roll of approximately 728 students. The school opened in 1893.
- Rolleston Christian School is a state-integrated nondenominational Christian school with a roll of approximately 277 students. The school opened in 2015.
- Te Rau Horopito School is a state school with a roll of approximately 70 students. The school opened in 2026.
- Te Rōhutu Whio School is a state school with a roll of approximately 343 students. The school opened in 2022.
- West Rolleston Primary School is a state school with a roll of approximately 751 students. The school opened in 2016.

Waitaha School is a special education school with a roll of 125 students.

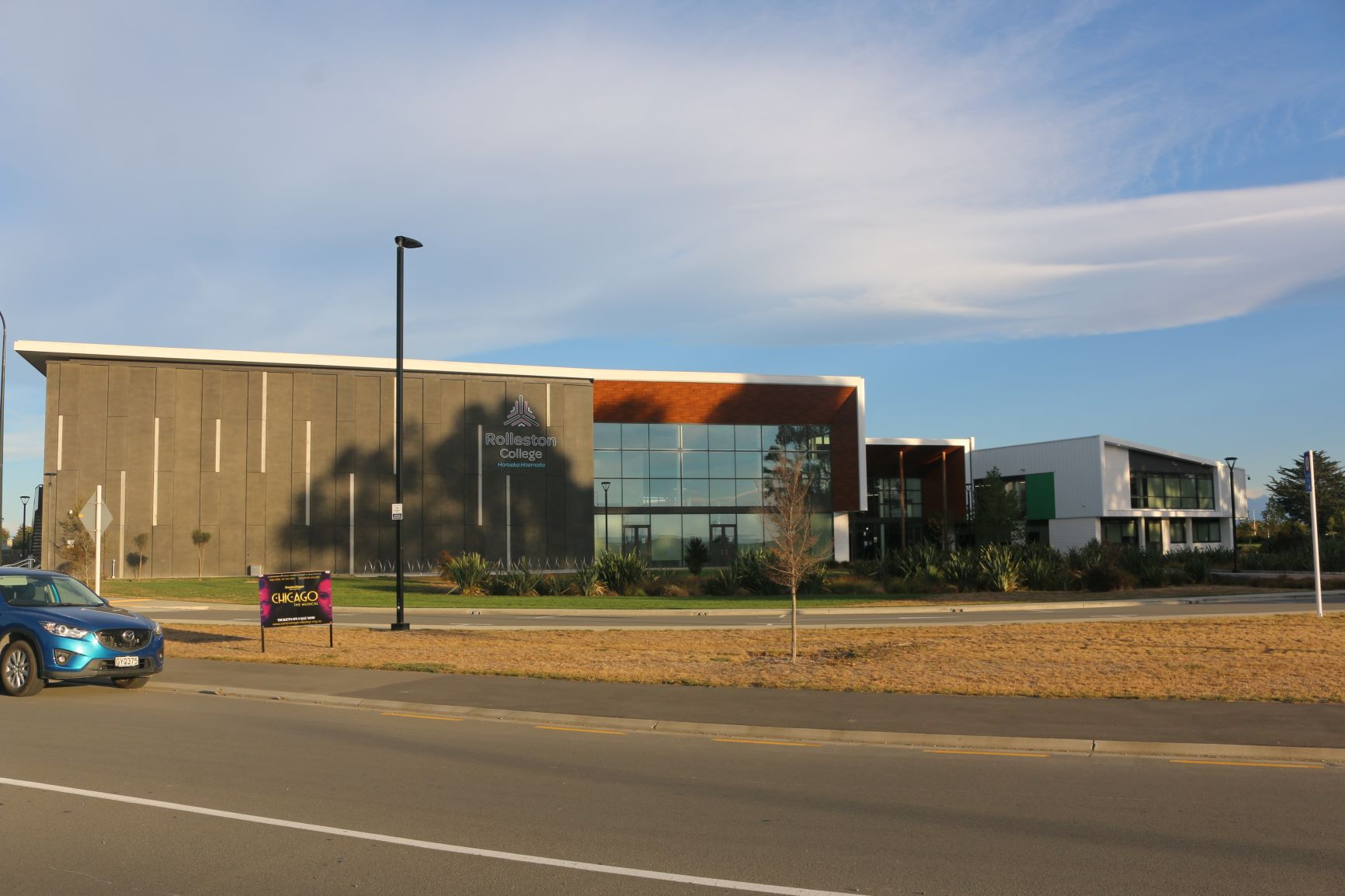
Rolleston College (April 2021)

Rolleston College is the sole secondary school in Rolleston, with a roll of approximately 1,968 students. The school operates on a multi-campus model, with years 9 to 11 at the Junior Campus (Campus Tuatahi) and years 12 to 13 at the Senior Campus (Campus Tuarua). It opened on 30 January 2017, initially taking only Year 9 students and adding year levels as the 2017 Year 9 cohort moved through; the school opened to all year levels (Years 9 to 13) in January 2021. The senior campus opened in February 2026.

Prior to Rolleston College's opening, the nearest secondary school to Rolleston was Lincoln High School in Lincoln.

All these schools are coeducational. Rolls are as of July 2026.

== Transport ==
=== Bus ===
Four local bus routes serve Rolleston, all being part of Environment Canterbury's Metro system: route 5 connects Rolleston with central Christchurch, Linwood, and New Brighton via Templeton, Hornby and Riccarton, route 820 (Burnham to Lincoln) connects Rolleston to the nearby towns of Burnham and Lincoln, and routes 84 Direct West and 85 Direct East (Rolleston to Ara Institute), which are express routes connecting Rolleston with Central Christchurch and Ara Institute via Christchurch Hospital. The two express routes operate on a trial basis in collaboration with Bentley Coachlines.

=== Rail ===
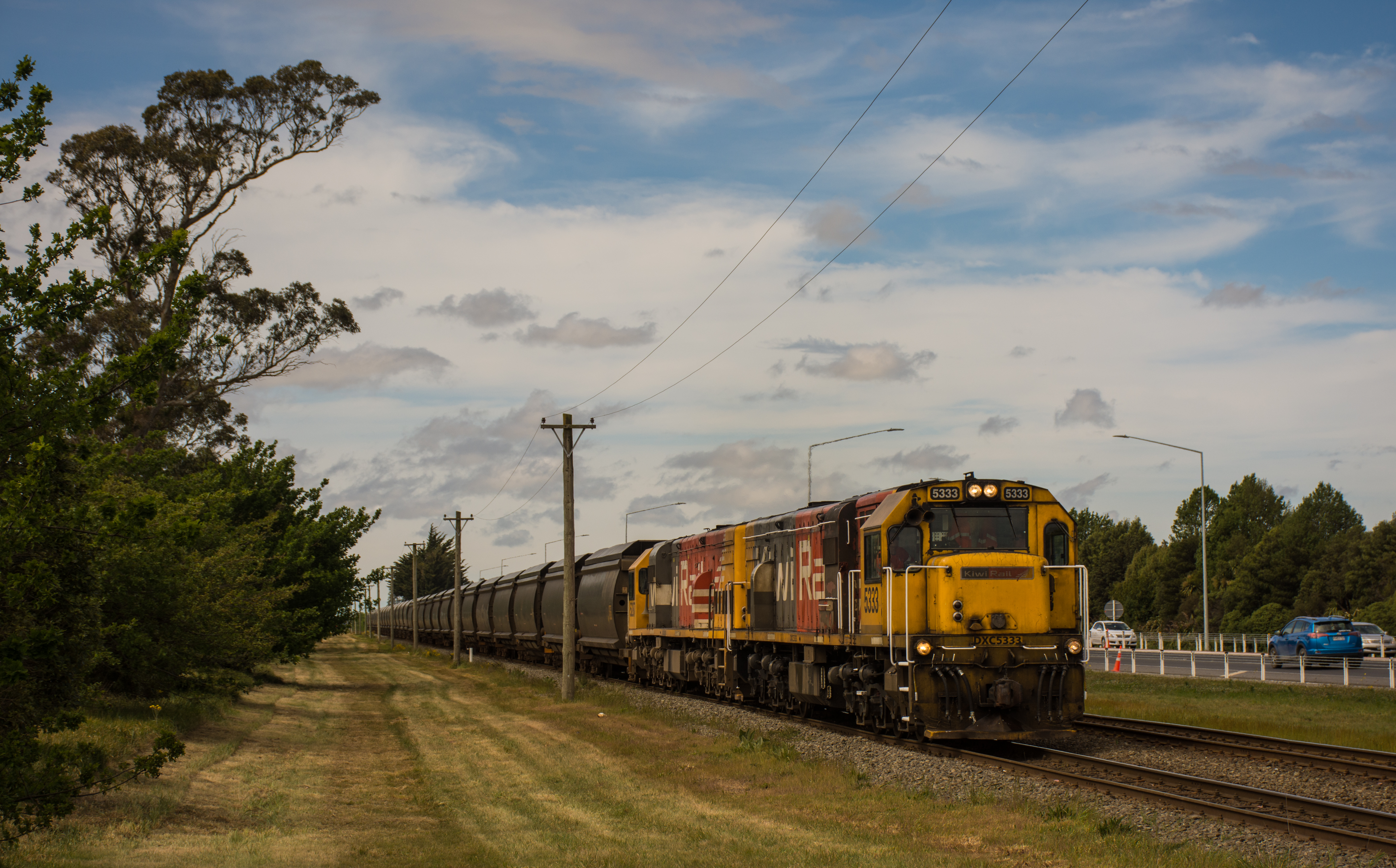
A train approaching outside of Rolleston

Rolleston is the site of the railway junction between the Midland line to Greymouth and the Main South Line. The town served as a major railway junction point from the 1880s until the late 1980s, when the New Zealand government deregulated the railways, and Rolleston became a stop only for the tourist-oriented TranzAlpine rail service. In 1993 Rolleston saw one of the country's worst level-crossing accidents, when a cement mixer truck collided with a passenger train at the now-closed George Holmes Road level crossing and killed three train passengers.

The Labour Party promised to invest $100 million in Christchurch's public transport, including commuter rail between Rolleston and the city if it won the 2017 election. Andrew Little said the Rolleston to Christchurch commuter railway line would be a permanent service and the Labour Party wanted to see it up and running "within a few years". A commuter railway line would require significant central government money and land acquisitions to be achievable. The New Zealand Transport Agency expects the business case should be ready in 2021.

A commuter rail link to Rolleston was under consideration in 2022. This was again under consideration in 2025.

Rolleston is home to a significant freight hub with the aim to reduce truck movements through Christchurch to the Port of Lyttelton.

=== Road ===
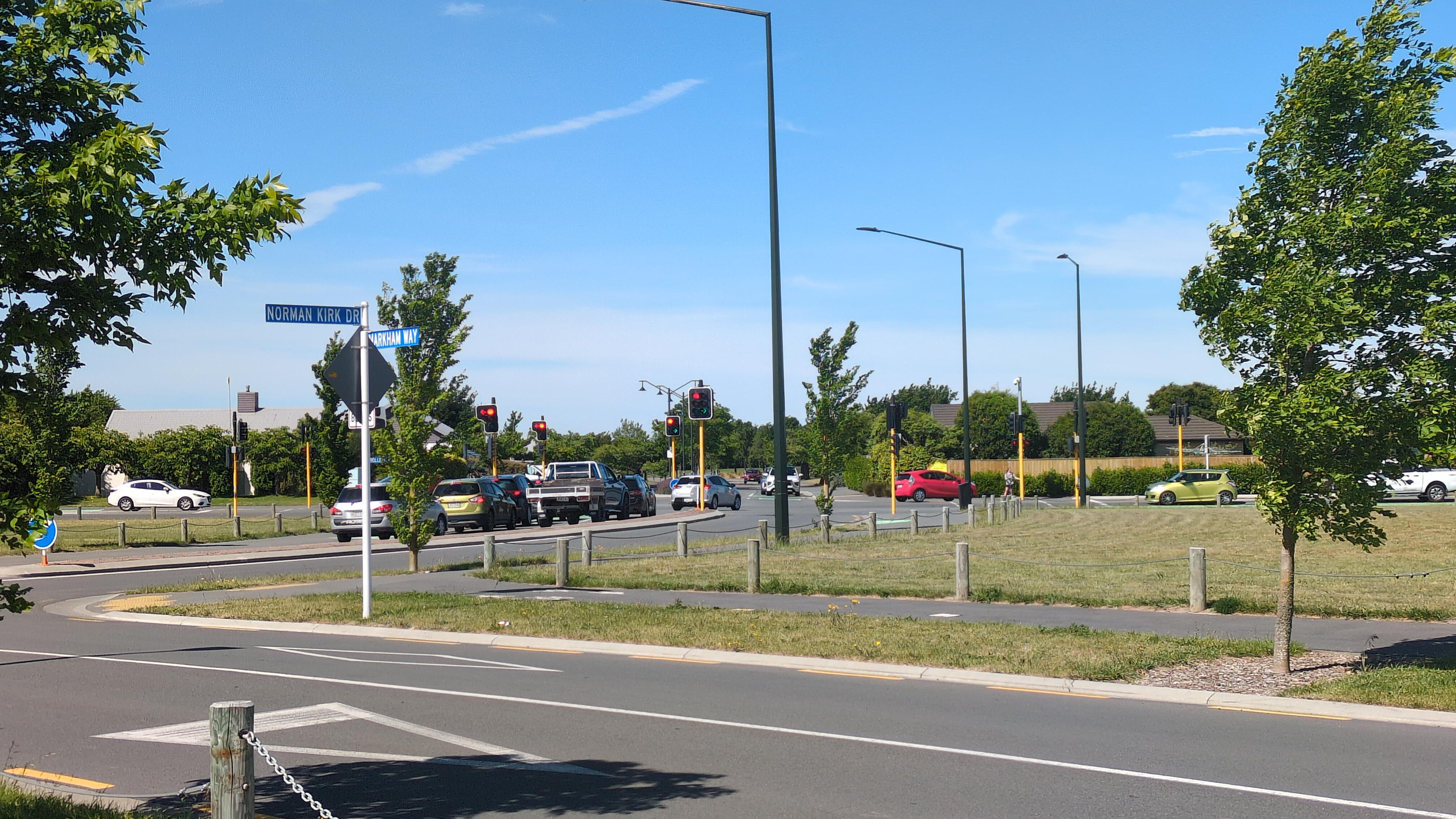
Rolleston Drive is proposed to connect to Izone

State Highway 1 passes through Rolleston on its route between Christchurch and Timaru. In September 2020, the extension of the Christchurch Southern Motorway was completed, connecting Rolleston and Addington at Brougham Street. This has significantly improved commuting times to Christchurch.

A two-lane overbridge has been proposed to connect residential areas of Rolleston to the industrial zone (Izone), crossing SH 1 from Rolleston Drive to Hoskyns Road. Construction is expected to commence in 2024 and be completed in late 2027. The project is expected to cost of $125 million.

=== Cycling ===
There are several cycling-friendly routes available with another under construction. Christchurch City Council major cycleway routes programme includes the South Express route, leading from Hagley Park, through Riccarton, Hei Hei and Islington to Templeton where it transitions to Selwyn District Council. From there, the route follows an off-road shared path and a quiet Manion Road until crossing State Highway 1 at Weedons Ross Road overbridge. The last mile is a sealed shared pathway and some further quiet urban streets.

Cycling between Rolleston and Lincoln follows a sealed shared path that runs beside "Lincoln Rolleston Road" and Boundary Road.

=== Air ===
The nearest major airport is Christchurch Airport, 21 km (13 mi) northeast of Rolleston. The town is under the approach to runway 02 at Christchurch Airport, and the airport's 50 dBA noise contour extends into eastern Rolleston, which has limited development in these areas.

== Government ==
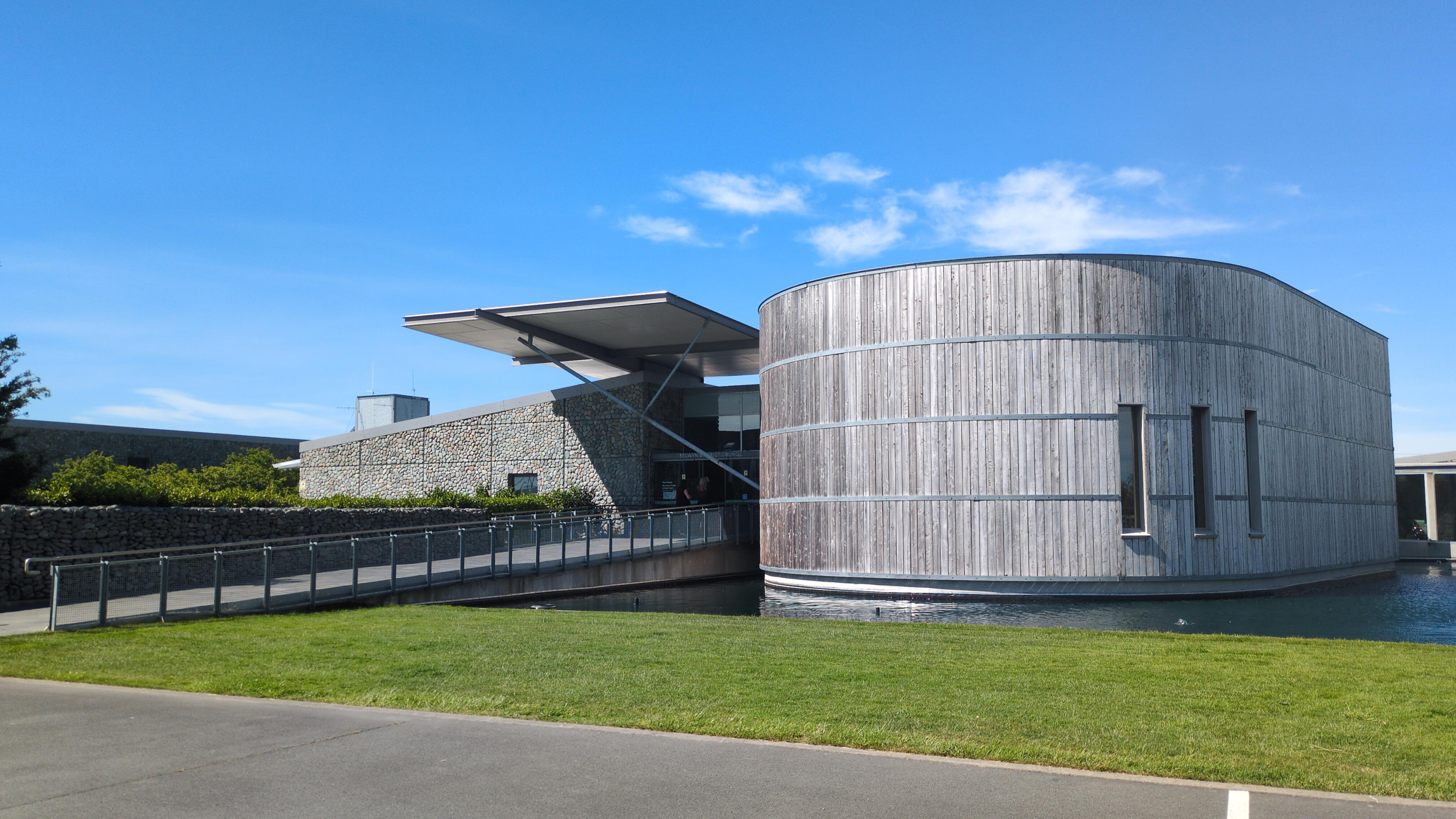
Selwyn District Council building in 2025

Rolleston is part of the Selwyn electorate. The Selwyn District Council is responsible for providing local government services to Rolleston. The Selwyn District Council is based in Rolleston at 2 Norman Kirk Drive.

== Prison ==
Rolleston Prison is located just west of the town, housing up to 260 minimum to medium security male prisoners.

== Military ==
Burnham Military Camp is located about 3 kilometres west from the town centre. Burnham was a major staging post for the NZDF and overseas military forces during the Christchurch Earthquakes.
