= Erotica Expo =

New Zealand adult entertainment convention

Erotica Lifestyles Expo
- Status: Active
- Genre: Adult
- Location: Auckland
- Country: New Zealand
- Inaugurated: 2000
- Most recent: 13–15 August 2010
- Attendance: 20,000+
- Organizer: Steve Crow
- Website: http://www.eroticaexpo.co.nz/

The Erotica Lifestyles Expo, informally known as "Erotica", is an adult entertainment convention held annually in Auckland, New Zealand and in a number of New Zealand regional cities semi-annually.

The 2010 Erotica Auckland, held from 13 to 15 August 2010, was the 18th Erotica Lifestyles Expo to be held in New Zealand and featured pornstars such as Nina Hartley, Buck Angel, Tory Lane, Gina Lynn and Dana DeArmond.

The conventions have been promoted by organiser and pornographer Steve Crow via a controversial Boobs on Bikes parade of topless pornstars and local people in various New Zealand cities.

The expo was first held in 2000, with about 50 retailers and erotica-related businesses in attendance. In 2004, the attendance was about 30,000 people, with around 130 exhibitors.

== Parade controversy ==
In 2006, substantial media coverage of attempts to ban the parade led to several weeks of political and moral debate in local political circles (with the mayor Dick Hubbard condemning the parade and the expo), the public and the media, resulting in the parade drawing several tens of thousands of spectators. In 2007, the parade received a Council permit, which incited another, much smaller debate, with attendance at the parade also being much smaller.
